= 1941 =

1941 in various calendars
- Gregorian calendar: 1941; MCMXLI
- Ab urbe condita: 2694
- Armenian calendar: 1390; ԹՎ ՌՅՂ
- Assyrian calendar: 6691
- Baháʼí calendar: 97–98
- Balinese saka calendar: 1862–1863
- Bengali calendar: 1347–1348
- Berber calendar: 2891
- British Regnal year: 5 Geo. 6 – 6 Geo. 6
- Buddhist calendar: 2485
- Burmese calendar: 1303
- Byzantine calendar: 7449–7450
- Chinese calendar: 庚辰年 (Metal Dragon); 4638 or 4431 — to — 辛巳年 (Metal Snake); 4639 or 4432
- Coptic calendar: 1657–1658
- Discordian calendar: 3107
- Ethiopian calendar: 1933–1934
- Hebrew calendar: 5701–5702
- Hindu calendars
- Vikram Samvat: 1997–1998
- Shaka Samvat: 1862–1863
- Kali Yuga: 5041–5042
- Holocene calendar: 11941
- Igbo calendar: 941–942
- Iranian calendar: 1319–1320
- Islamic calendar: 1359–1360
- Japanese calendar: Shōwa 16 (昭和１６年)
- Javanese calendar: 1871–1872
- Juche calendar: 30
- Julian calendar: Gregorian minus 13 days
- Korean calendar: 4274
- Minguo calendar: ROC 30 民國30年
- Nanakshahi calendar: 473
- Thai solar calendar: 2484
- Tibetan calendar: ལྕགས་ཕོ་འབྲུག་ལོ་ (male Iron-Dragon); 2067 or 1686 or 914 — to — ལྕགས་མོ་སྦྲུལ་ལོ་ (female Iron-Snake); 2068 or 1687 or 915

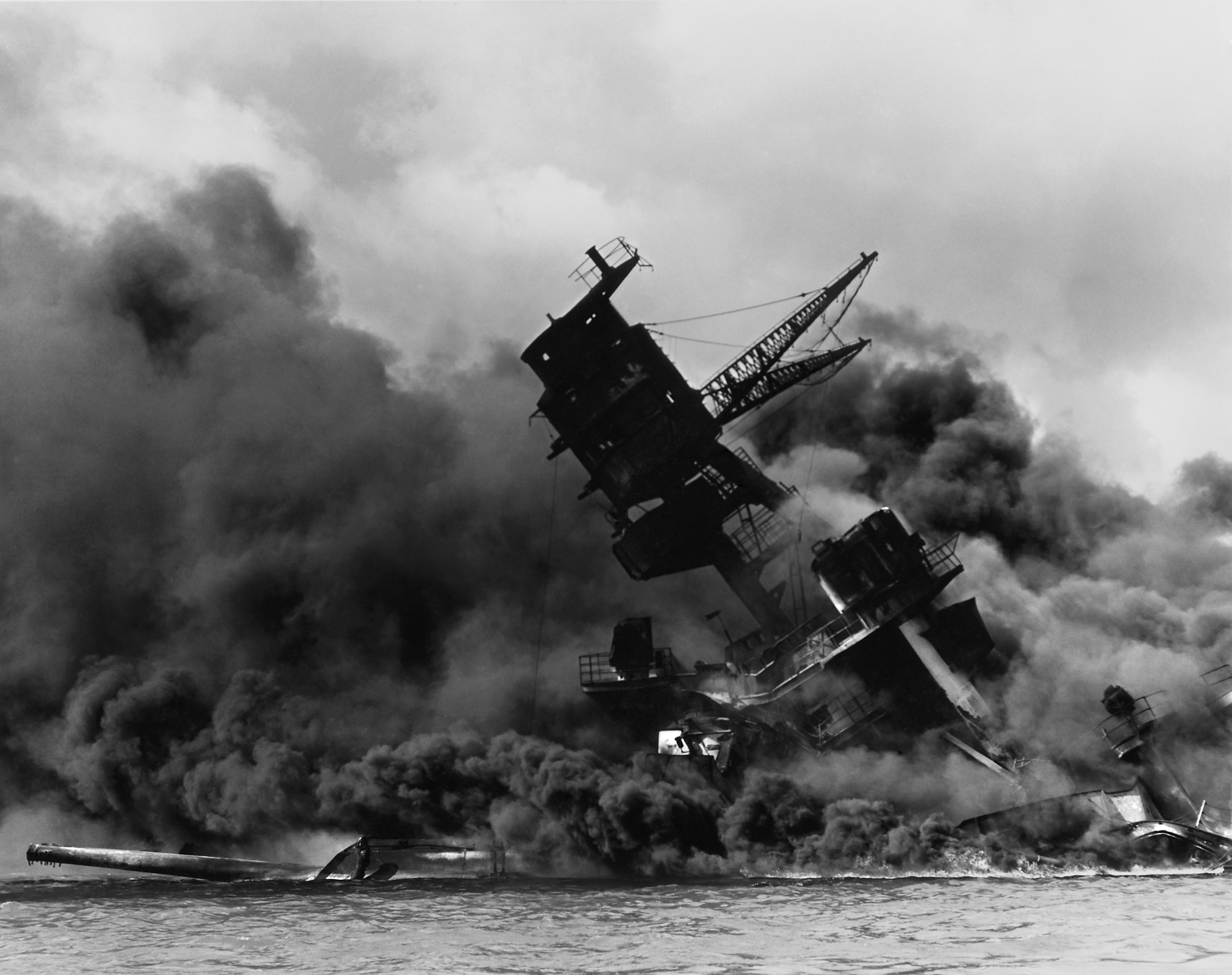
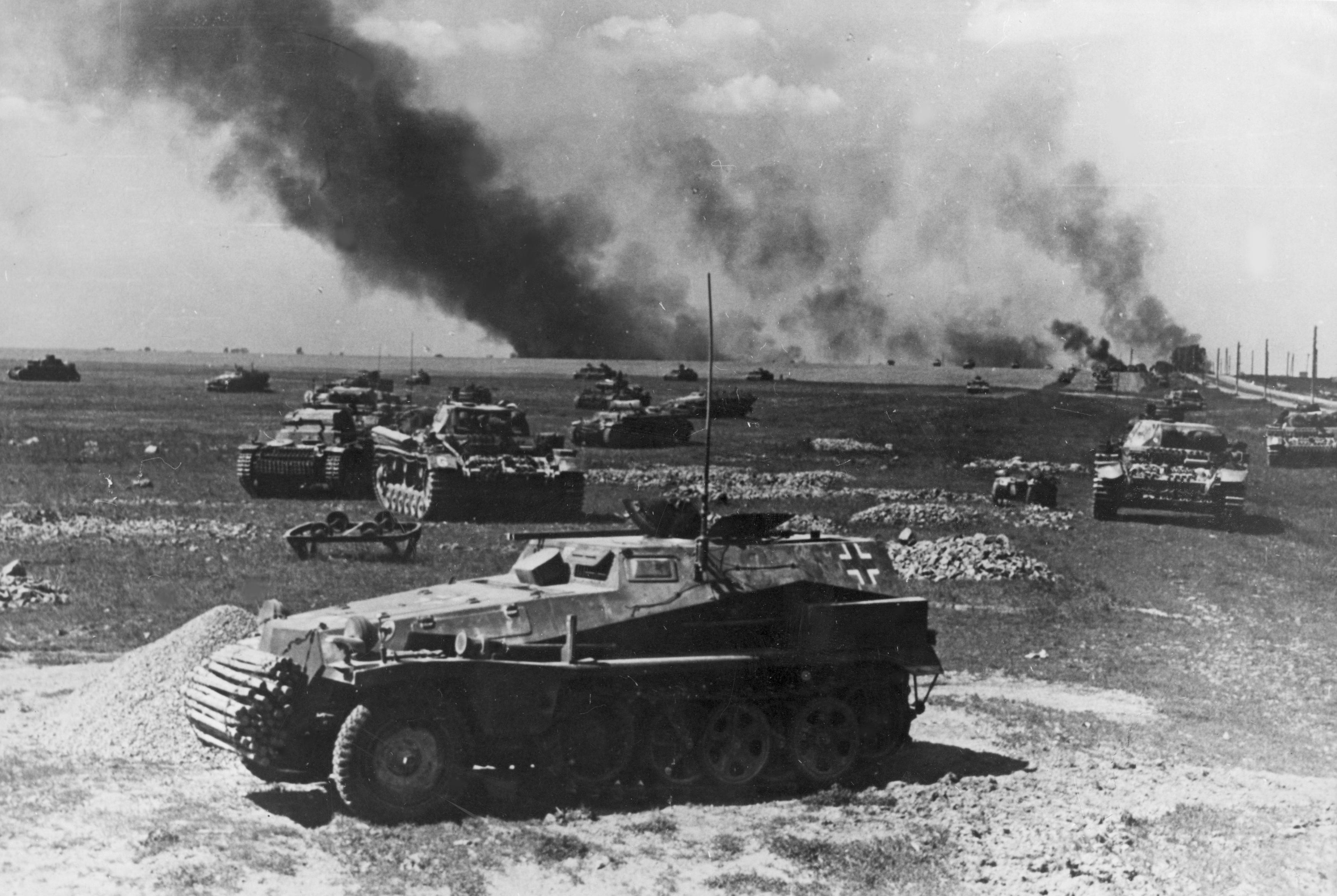
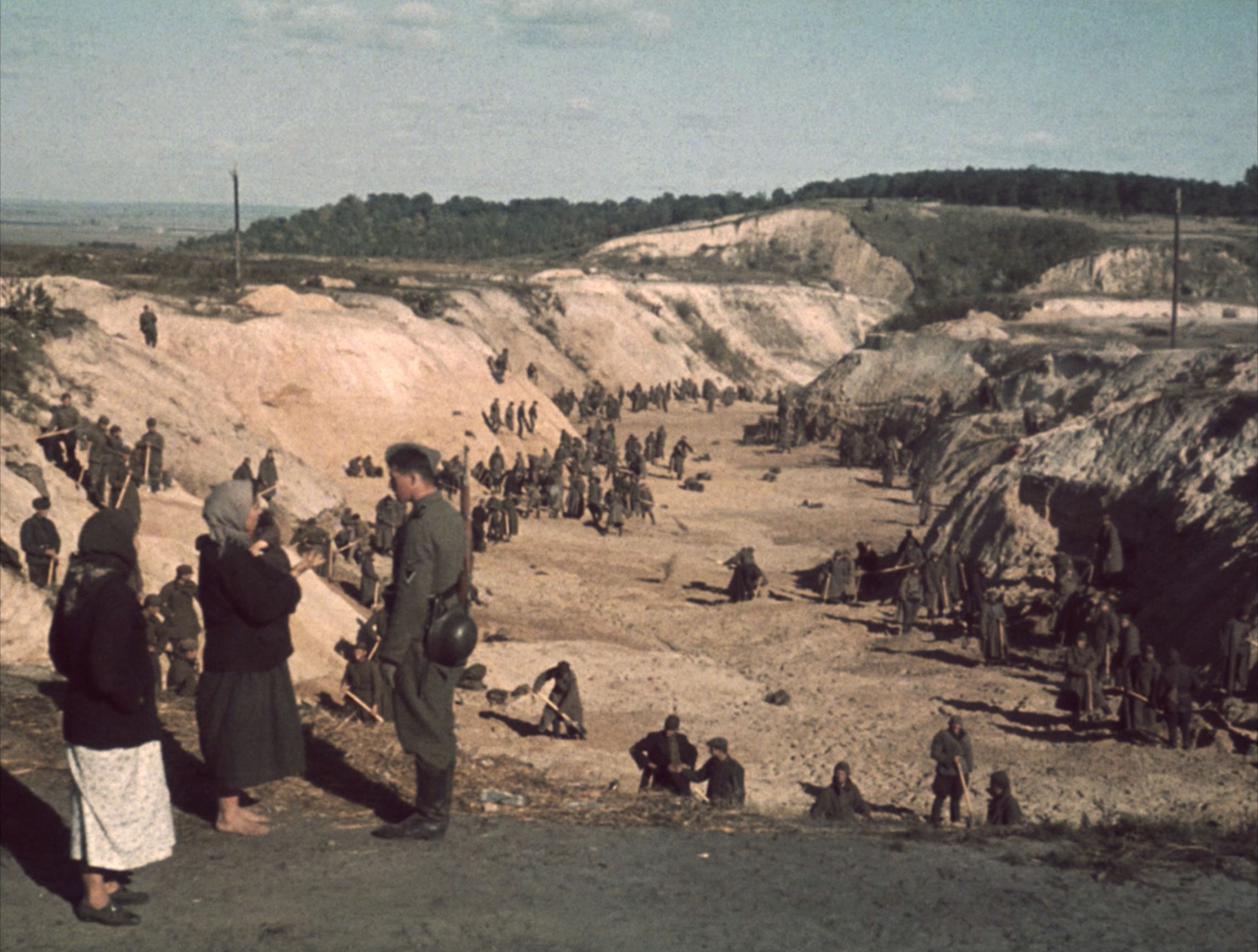
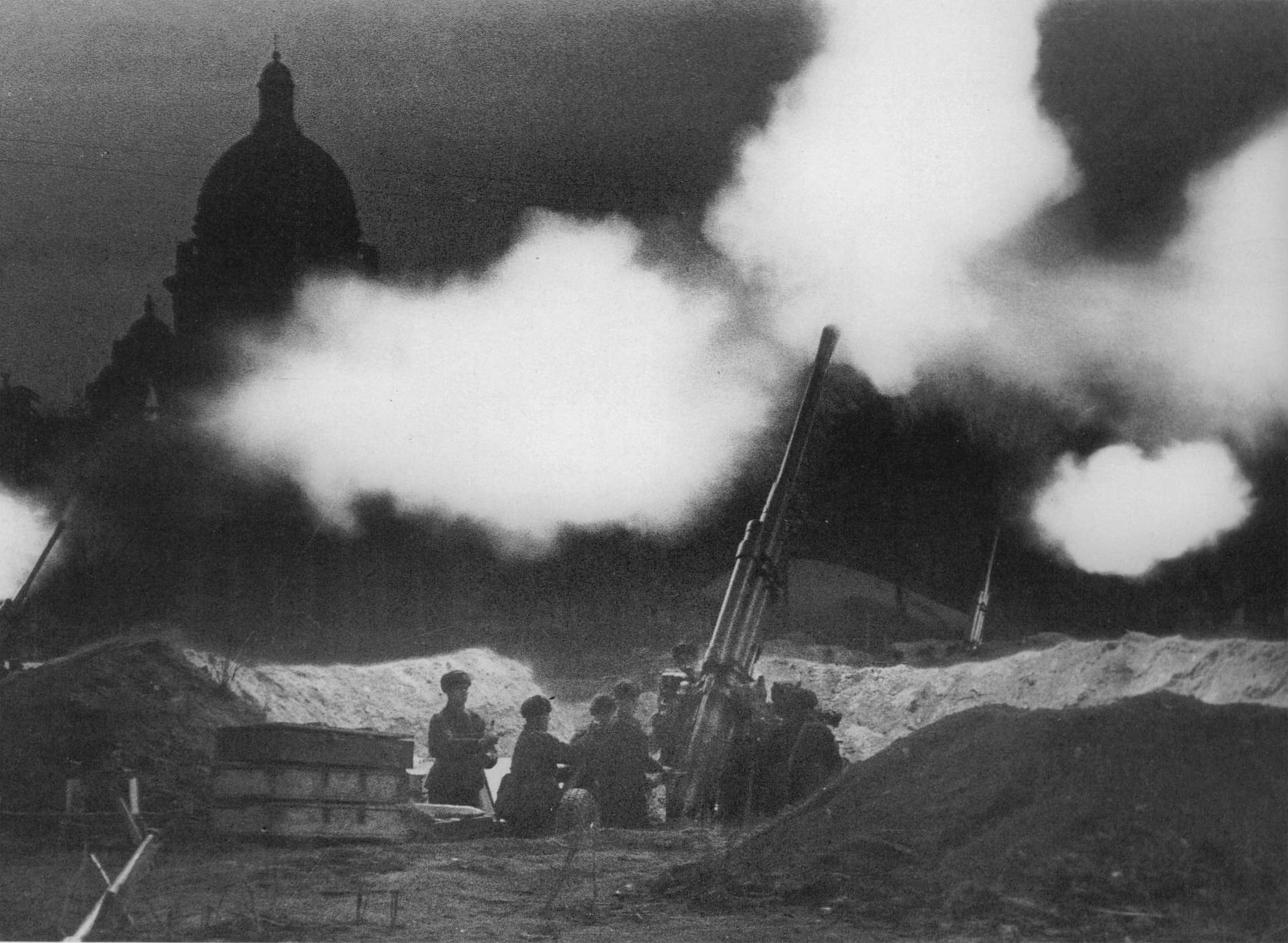
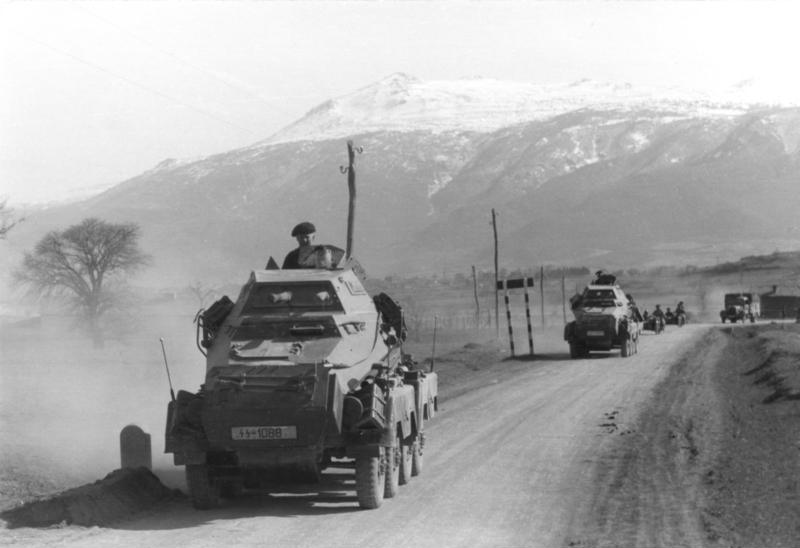
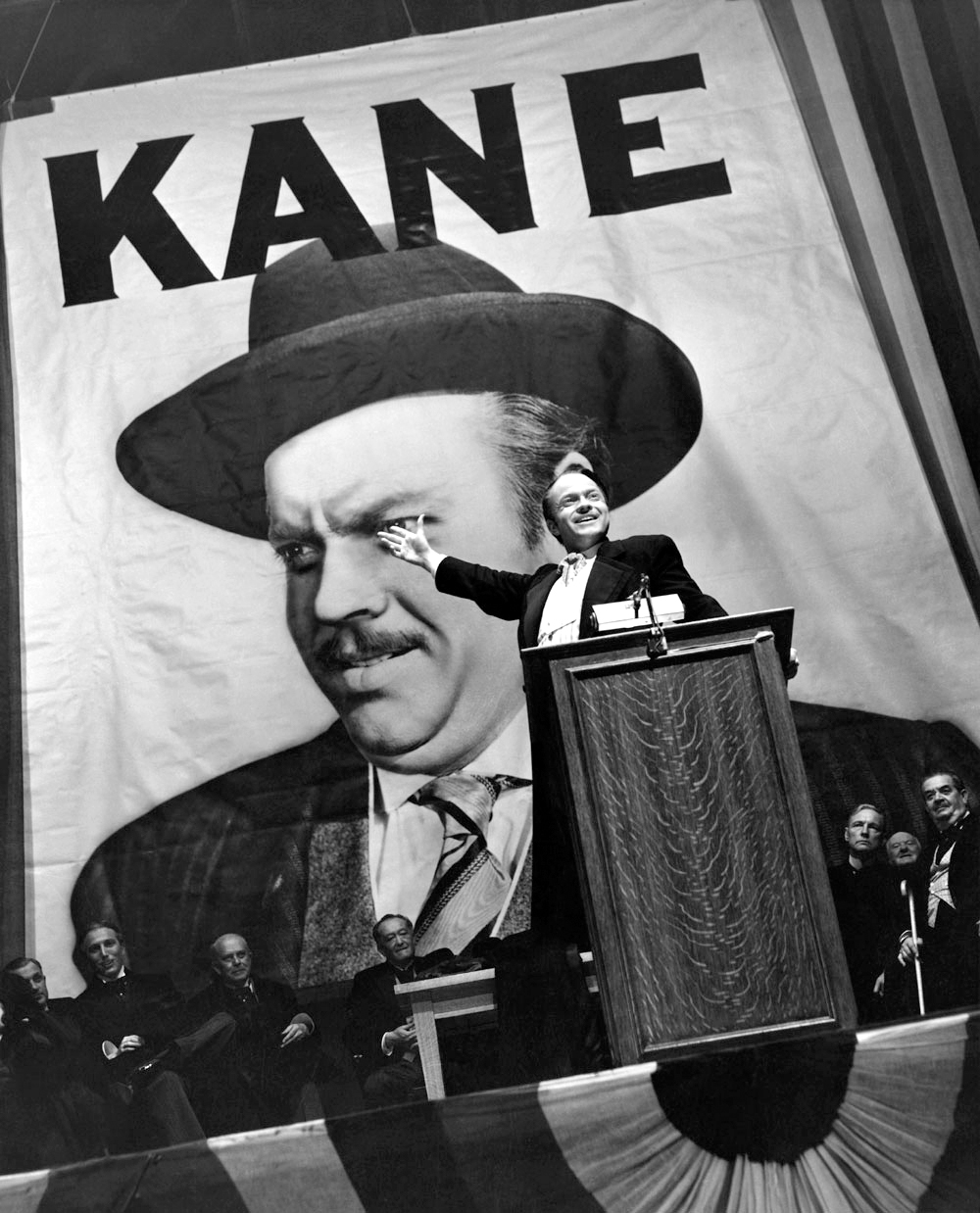
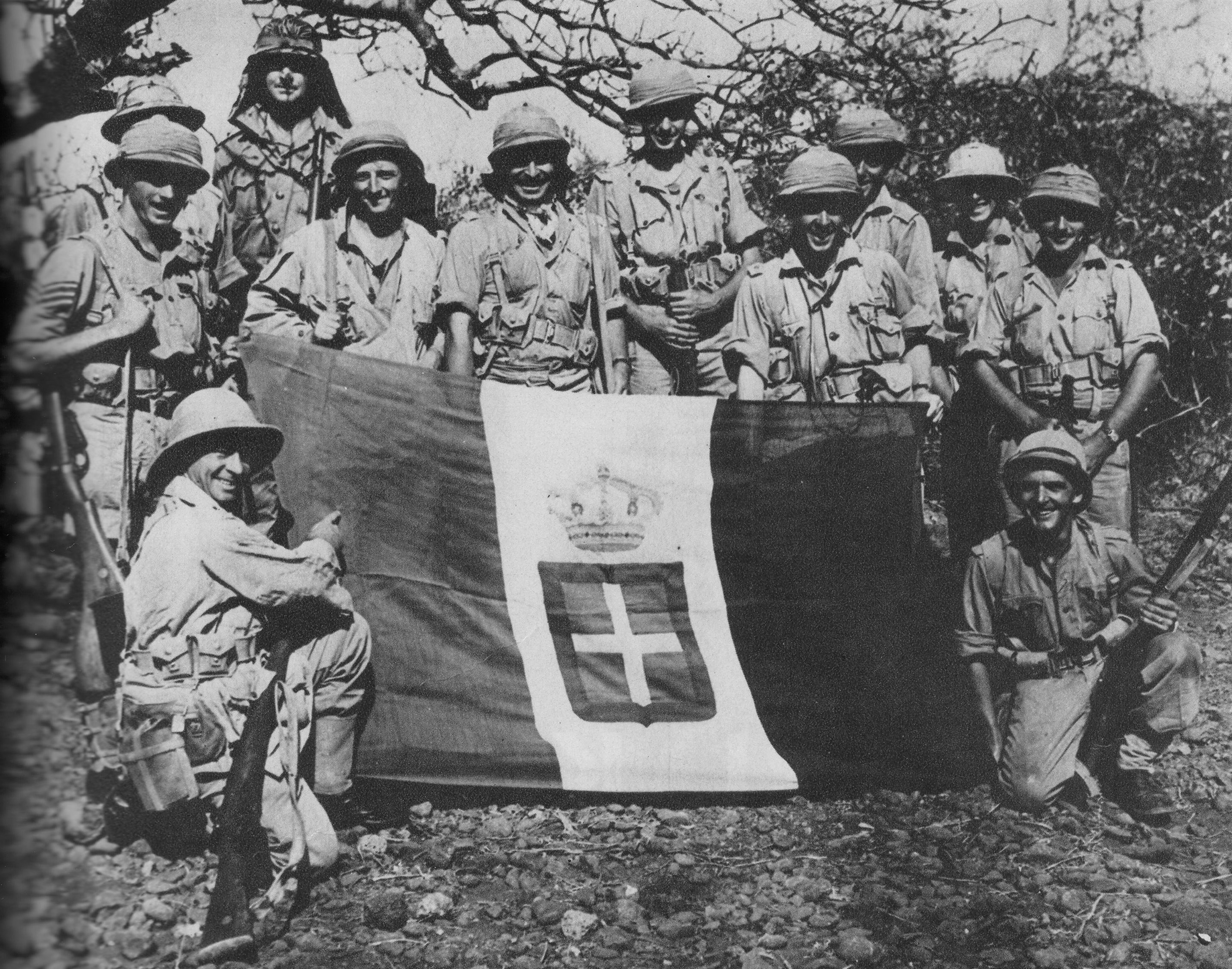
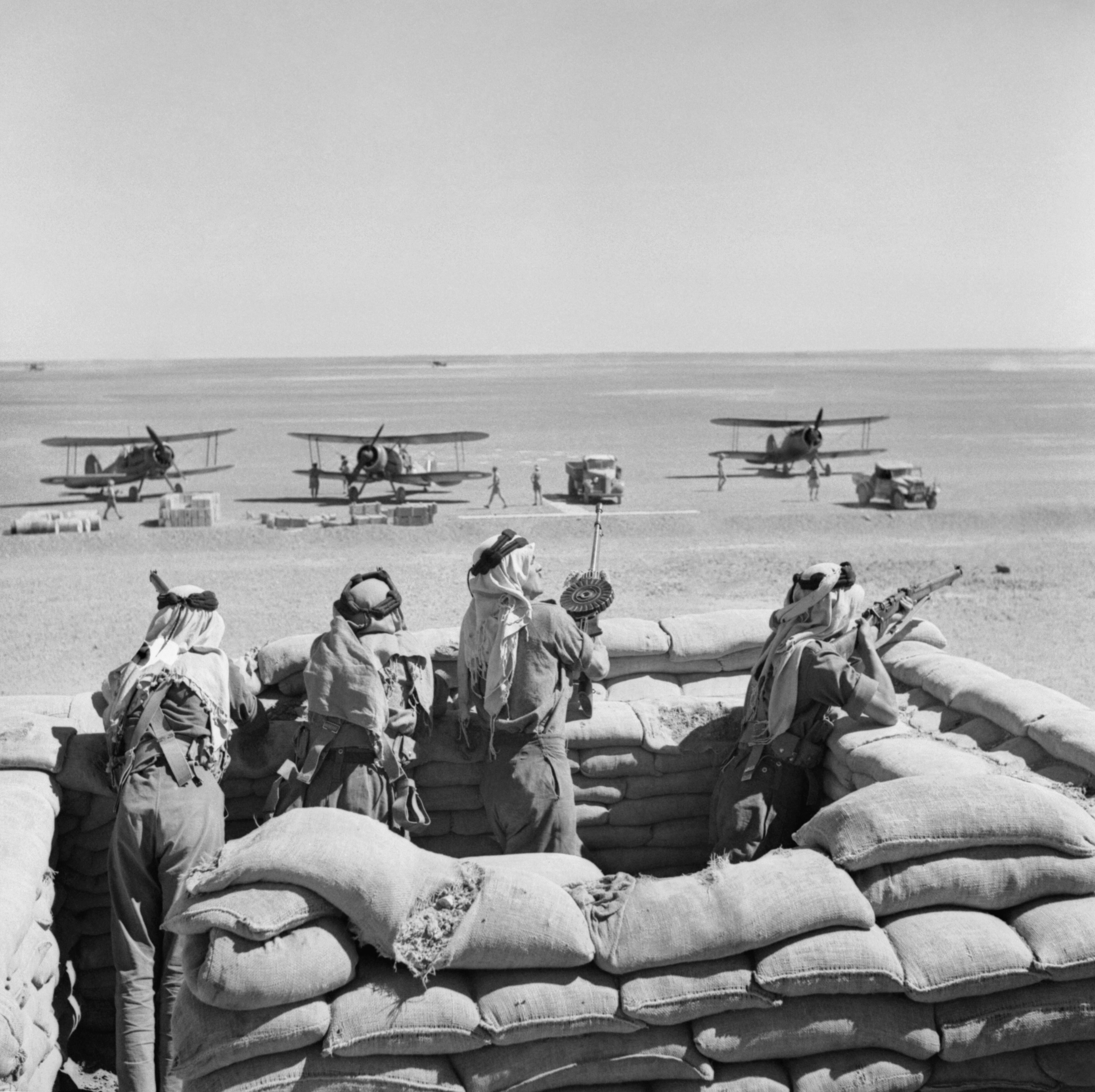
From top to bottom, left to right:
- The Attack on Pearl Harbor by the Empire of Japan brings the United States into World War II;
- Operation Barbarossa launches Nazi Germany’s massive invasion of the Soviet Union;
- The Babi Yar massacre sees over 33,000 Jews killed by Nazi Einsatzgruppen near Kyiv;
- The Siege of Leningrad begins, starting one of history’s deadliest sieges;
- The Invasion of Yugoslavia leads to rapid Axis occupation;
- Orson Welles’ film Citizen Kane premieres, revolutionizing cinema;
- The East African campaign ends with Allied victory over Italian forces;
- The Anglo-Iraqi War secures British control in Iraq;
- The German invasion of Greece results in swift Axis occupation.

1941 (MCMXLI) was a common year starting on Wednesday of the Gregorian calendar, the 1941st year of the Common Era (CE) and Anno Domini (AD) designations, the 941st year of the 2nd millennium, the 41st year of the 20th century, and the 2nd year of the 1940s decade.

The Correlates of War project estimates this to be the deadliest year in human history in terms of conflict deaths, placing the death toll at 3.49 million. However, the Uppsala Conflict Data Program estimates that the subsequent year, 1942, was the deadliest such year. Death toll estimates for both 1941 and 1942 range from 2.28 to 7.71 million each.

== Events ==
Below, the events of World War II have the "WWII" prefix.

=== January ===
- January–August – 10,072 men, women and children with mental and physical disabilities are asphyxiated with carbon monoxide in a gas chamber, at Hadamar killing centre in Germany, in the first phase of mass-murder under the Aktion T4 program here.
- January 1 – Thailand's Prime Minister Plaek Phibunsongkhram decrees January 1 as the official start of the Thai solar calendar new year (thus the previous year that began April 1 had only 9 months).
- January 3 – A decree (Normalschrifterlass) promulgated in Germany by Martin Bormann, on behalf of Adolf Hitler, requires replacement of blackletter typefaces by Antiqua.
- January 4 – The short subject Elmer's Pet Rabbit is released, marking the second appearance of Bugs Bunny, and also the first to have his name on a title card.
- January 5 – WWII: Battle of Bardia in Libya: Australian and British troops defeat Italian forces, the first battle of the war in which an Australian Army formation takes part.
- January 6
  - During his State of the Union address, President of the United States Franklin D. Roosevelt presents his Four Freedoms, as fundamental global human rights.
  - The keel of battleship USS Missouri is laid at the New York Navy Yard in Brooklyn.
- January 10 – The Lend-Lease Act is introduced into the United States Congress.
- January 11 – WWII: The British Royal Navy light cruiser HMS Southampton (83) is bombed, catches fire and has to be sunk off Malta, with the loss of 81 crew.
- January 13 – All persons born in Puerto Rico since this day are declared U.S. citizens by birth, through U.S. federal law.
- January 14
  - WWII: Commerce raiding German auxiliary cruiser Pinguin captures the Norwegian whaling fleet near Bouvet Island, effectively ending Southern Ocean whaling for the duration of the war.
  - In a BBC radio broadcast from London, Victor de Laveleye asks all Belgians to use the letter "V" as a rallying sign, being the first letter of victoire (victory) in French and of vrijheid (freedom) in Dutch. This is the beginning of the "V campaign" which sees "V" graffities on the walls of Belgium and later all of Europe and introduces the use of the "V sign" for victory and freedom. Winston Churchill adopts the sign soon afterwards, though he sometimes gets it the wrong way around and uses the common insult gesture.
- January 15 – John Vincent Atanasoff and Clifford Berry describe the workings of the Atanasoff–Berry computer in print.
- January 19 – WWII: British troops attack Italian-held Eritrea in Africa.
- January 22
  - WWII: Battle of Tobruk: Australian and British forces capture Tobruk from the Italians.
  - In Sweden, Victor Hasselblad registers the Hasselblad Camera Company.
- January 23 – Aviator Charles Lindbergh testifies before the U.S. Congress, and recommends that the United States negotiate a neutrality pact with Adolf Hitler.
- January 27 – WWII: Joseph Grew, the U.S. ambassador to Japan, reports to Washington a rumor overheard at a diplomatic reception, concerning a planned surprise attack on Pearl Harbor, Hawaii.
- January 28 – Subhas Chandra Bose, the chief of the separatist Indian National Army, reaches Kabul, Afghanistan by successfully evading the British authorities in British India.
- January 30 – WWII: Australians capture Derna, Libya, from the Italians.

=== February ===
- February 3 – WWII: The Nazis forcibly restore Pierre Laval to the office of Prime Minister in occupied Vichy France.
- February 4 – WWII: The United Service Organization (USO) is created to entertain American troops.
- February 5 – The Air Training Corps is formed in the United Kingdom.
- February 5–April 1 – WWII: Battle of Keren – British and Free French Forces fight hard to capture the strategic town of Keren in Italian Eritrea.
- February 6 – WWII: Benghazi falls to the British Western Desert Force. Lieutenant-General Erwin Rommel is appointed commander of Afrika Korps.
- February 8 – WWII: The U.S. House of Representatives passes the Lend-Lease Act.
- February 9 – Winston Churchill, in a worldwide broadcast, tells the United States to show its support by sending arms to the British: "Give us the tools, and we will finish the job."
- February 12
  - WWII: Erwin Rommel arrives in Tripoli.
  - Reserve Constable Albert Alexander, a patient at the Radcliffe Infirmary in Oxford, England, becomes the first person treated with penicillin intravenously, by Howard Florey's team. He reacts positively, but there is insufficient supply of the drug to reverse his terminal infection. A successful treatment is achieved during May.
- February 13 – Aircraft from British carrier HMS Formidable attack Massawa in Eritrea.
- February 14 – WWII: Admiral Kichisaburō Nomura begins his duties as Japanese Ambassador to the United States.
- February 19–22 – WWII: Three Nights' Blitz over Swansea, South Wales: Over these 3 nights of intensive bombing, which lasts a total of 13 hours and 48 minutes, Swansea's town centre is almost completely obliterated by the 896 high explosive bombs employed by the Luftwaffe; 397 casualties and 230 deaths are reported.
- February 22 – WWII: British cruiser HMS Shropshire bombards Barawa, on the coast between Kismayo and Mogadishu.
- February 23 – Glenn T. Seaborg and associates isolate and discover plutonium, at the University of California, Berkeley.
- February 25 – WWII:
  - The occupied Netherlands starts the first popular uprising in Europe against the Axis powers, the "February strike" against German deportation of Jews in Amsterdam and surroundings.
  - British submarine HMS Upright attacks an Italian convoy, sinking the cruiser Armando Diaz off Tunisia.
- February 27 – WWII: The New Zealand Division cruiser HMS Leander (1931) sinks Italian armed merchant raider Ramb I off the Maldives.

=== March ===
- March 1
  - WWII: Bulgaria signs the Tripartite Pact, thus joining the Axis powers.
  - Arthur L. Bristol becomes Rear Admiral for the United States Navy's Support Force, Atlantic Fleet.
- March 4 – WWII: Operation Claymore – British Commandos carry out a successful raid on the Lofoten Islands, off the north coast of Norway.
- March 11 – WWII: Franklin D. Roosevelt, President of the United States, signs the Lend-Lease Act (passed by the Senate on March 8) into law, providing for the U.S. to provide Lend-Lease aid to the Allies.
- March 15 – Berlin-based American journalist Richard C. Hottelet is arrested by the Gestapo on "suspicion of espionage", but eventually released in July as part of a prisoner exchange with the U.S.
- March 16 – A group of U.S. warships arrive in Auckland, New Zealand, on a goodwill visit. On March 20, they arrive in Sydney, Australia.
- March 17
  - In Washington, D.C., the National Gallery of Art is officially opened by President Franklin D. Roosevelt.
  - British Minister of Labour Ernest Bevin calls for women to fill vital jobs.
- March 22 – Washington state's Grand Coulee Dam begins to generate electricity.
- March 24 – WWII: Rommel launches his first offensive in Cyrenaica.
- March 25 – WWII: The Kingdom of Yugoslavia joins the Axis powers in Vienna.
- March 27 – WWII:
  - Battle of Cape Matapan: Off the Peloponnese coast in the Mediterranean, British naval forces defeat those of Italy, sinking 5 warships (the battle ends on March 29).
  - Yugoslav coup d'état: An anti-Axis coup d'état in the Kingdom of Yugoslavia led by General Dušan Simović, Brigadier General Borivoje Mirković, Colonels Dragutin Savić and Stjepan Burazović, Colonel General Miodrag Lazić, Milorad Petrović and many other general officers (with British support) forces Prince Paul into exile; 17-year-old King Peter II assumes power following the coup and Simović is elected new Prime Minister of Yugoslavia.
  - Japanese spy Takeo Yoshikawa arrives in Honolulu to study the United States Pacific Fleet at Pearl Harbor, in preparation for a future attack.
- March 30 – WWII:
  - All German, Italian and Danish ships anchored in United States waters are taken into "protective custody".
  - A German Lorenz cipher machine operator sends a 4,000-character message twice, allowing British mathematician Bill Tutte to decipher the machine's coding mechanism.

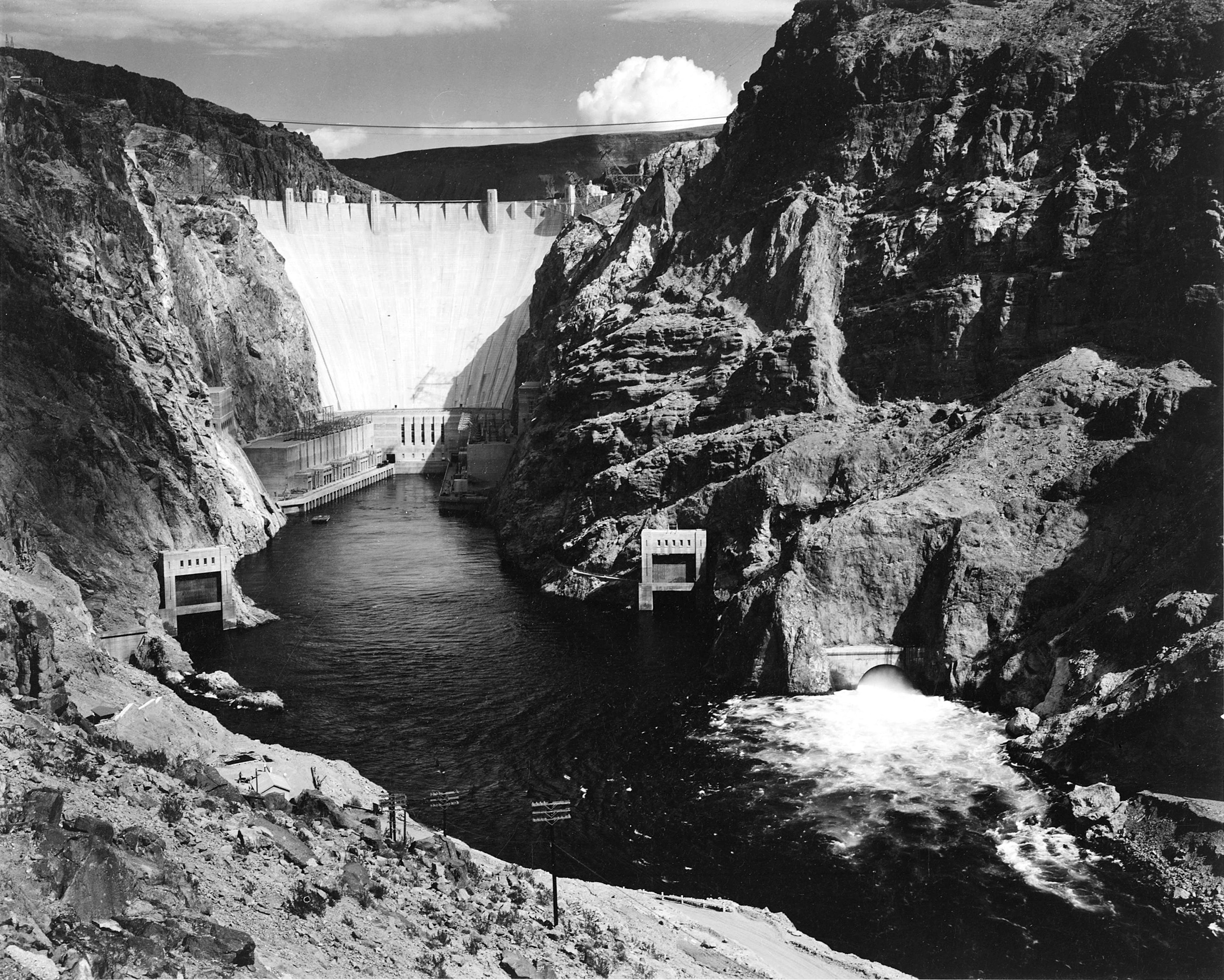
Ansel Adams photograph of the Hoover Dam in 1941.

=== April ===
- April 1 – A military coup d'état, launched by Rashid Ali Al-Gaylani, overthrows the pro-British regime in Iraq.
- April 4 – WWII: Axis forces capture Benghazi.
- April 6 – WWII: Germany, Italy and Hungary invade Yugoslavia and the Battle of Greece begins.
- April 9 – The U.S. acquires full military defense rights in Greenland.
- April 10 – WWII:
  - U.S. destroyer USS Niblack, while picking up survivors from a sunken Dutch freighter, drops depth charges on the German U-boat U-52 (the first "shot in anger" fired by America against Germany).
  - The Independent State of Croatia, a puppet state of the Axis powers, is established with Ustashe leader Ante Pavelić as head (Poglavnik) of the government.
- April 12 – WWII: German troops enter Belgrade.
- April 13 – The Soviet–Japanese Neutrality Pact is signed.
- April 14 – The Valley of Geysers is discovered on the Kamchatka Peninsula of Russia, by Soviet geologist Tatyana Ustinova.
- April 15 – WWII: Axis forces reach Halfaya Pass, on the Libyan-Egyptian frontier.
- April 17 – WWII: Yugoslavia capitulates after the joint Axis invasion of the country results in the bombing of Belgrade.
- April 18 – WWII: Greek Prime Minister Alexandros Koryzis commits suicide as German troops approach Athens.
- April 21 – WWII: Greece capitulates to Germany. Commonwealth troops and some elements of the Greek Army withdraw to Crete.
- April 23 – The America First Committee holds its first mass rally in New York City, with Charles Lindbergh as keynote speaker.
- April 25 – Franklin D. Roosevelt, at his regular press conference, criticizes Charles Lindbergh by comparing him to the Copperheads of the Civil War period. In response, Lindbergh resigns his commission in the U.S. Army Air Corps Reserve on April 28.
- April 27 – WWII: German troops enter Athens.
- April 28 – World War II persecution of Serbs: Gudovac massacre – Members of the Croatian nationalist Ustashe movement kill around 190 Bjelovar Serbs in the village of Gudovac, in the Independent State of Croatia.

=== May ===
- May 1
  - The breakfast cereal Cheerios is introduced as CheeriOats by General Mills in the United States.
  - Orson Welles' first film Citizen Kane premieres in New York City; it will be frequently cited as the best film ever made.
  - The first Defense Bonds and Defense Savings Stamps go on sale in the United States, to help fund the greatly increased production of military equipment.
- May 2 – WWII: Anglo-Iraqi War – British combat operations against the rebel government of Rashid Ali in the Kingdom of Iraq begin.
- May 5 – WWII: Emperor Haile Selassie of Ethiopia re-enters Addis Ababa, which has been liberated from Italian forces; this date is subsequently commemorated as Liberation Day in the country.
- May 6 – At California's March Field, entertainer Bob Hope performs his first USO Show.
- May 8 – WWII: The German auxiliary cruiser Pinguin is sunk by British cruiser HMS Cornwall (56) in the Indian Ocean; 555 are killed.
- May 9 – WWII: German submarine U-110 is captured by the British Royal Navy in the North Atlantic. On board is the latest Enigma cryptography machine, which Allied cryptographers later use to break coded German messages.
- May 10
  - WWII: The British House of Commons is damaged by the Luftwaffe in an air raid on London.
  - Rudolf Hess parachutes into Scotland, claiming to be on a peace mission.
- May 11/May 12 – WWII: The Ustaše massacre 260–373 Serb men in a Catholic church in Glina, Croatia, where the men have assembled to be received into the Catholic faith in exchange for their lives.
- May 12 – Konrad Zuse presents the Z3, the world's first working programmable, fully automatic computer, in Berlin.
- May 13 – WWII: Yugoslav General Draža Mihailović and a group of 80 soldiers and officers cross the Drina river in Bosnia and Herzegovina, arrive at Ravna Gora, in western Nazi-occupied Serbia and start fighting with German occupation troops.
- May 15
  - The first British jet aircraft, the Gloster E.28/39, is flown.
  - Joe DiMaggio's 56-game hitting streak begins, as the New York Yankees' center fielder goes 1 for 4 against Chicago White Sox pitcher Eddie Smith in baseball.
- May 19 – The Viet Minh is formed at Pác Bó in Vietnam, to overthrow French rule of the nation, as an alliance between the Indochina Communist party, led by Ho Chi Minh, and the Nationalist party. It will become the Viet Cong during the Vietnam War.
- May 20 – WWII: The Battle of Crete begins, as Germany launches an airborne invasion of Crete, the first mainly airborne invasion in military history.
- May 21 – German submarine U-69 sinks the U.S.-flagged SS Robin Moor off the west African coast, having allowed the passengers and crew to disembark.
- May 24 – WWII:
  - In the North Atlantic, German battleship Bismarck sinks British battlecruiser HMS Hood, killing all but 3 crewmen, from a total of 1,418 aboard the pride of the Royal Navy.
  - In the Mediterranean, British submarine HMS Upholder torpedoes and sinks Italian ocean liner SS Conte Rosso, in use as a troopship.
- May 26 – WWII: In the North Atlantic, Fairey Swordfish aircraft from the carrier HMS Ark Royal cripple the steering of German battleship Bismarck in an aerial torpedo attack.
- May 27
  - WWII: Franklin D. Roosevelt, President of the United States, proclaims an "unlimited national emergency".
  - WWII: German battleship Bismarck is sunk in the North Atlantic, killing 2,300. It is eventually found in 1989.
  - The Swiss Socialist Federation is banned.
- May 29 – The Disney animators' strike begins, due to lack of recognition by Walt Disney of his animators' inequities of pay and privileges.
- May 30 – WWII: Manolis Glezos and Apostolos Santas tear down the Nazi swastika on the Acropolis in Athens and replace it with the Greek flag.
- May 31 – Anglo-Iraqi War: British troops complete the re-occupation of the Kingdom of Iraq, returning Prince 'Abd al-Ilah to power as regent for Faisal II.

=== June ===
- June 1 – WWII: The Battle of Crete ends, as the island surrenders to invading German forces.
- June 4 – Guidelines for the Conduct of the Troops in Russia are issued by Nazi high-command through OKW. This order (a lesser known precursor to the Commisar Order) explicitly commands that Jews (in addition to Bolshevik partisans and Commisars) be killed. In a sense, this order – in combination with the Commissar Order about to be delivered, and Goring's instruction to Heydrich to look into logistics later in the month, that is mentioned at the beginning of the Wannsee Conference of the following year – inaugurates the European Holocaust of the Jews.
- June 5
  - Second Sino-Japanese War: Four thousand Chongqing residents are asphyxiated in a bomb shelter during the Bombing of Chongqing in China.
  - Smederevo Fortress explosion: A Serbian ammunition depot explodes at Smederevo on the outskirts of Belgrade, Serbia, killing 2,500 and injuring over 4,500.
- June 6 – WWII: The Commissar Order is issued by Oberkommando der Wehrmacht, requiring all Soviet political commissars identified in Operation Barbarossa among captured forces to receive summary execution.
- June 8 – WWII: British and Free French forces invade Syria.
- June 13 – TASS, the official Soviet news agency, denies reports of tension between Germany and the Soviet Union.
- June 14
  - June deportation: Soviet officials deport about 65,000 people from Estonia, Latvia and Lithuania to Siberia.
  - All German and Italian assets in the United States are frozen.
- June 16
  - All German and Italian consulates in the United States are ordered closed, and their staffs to leave the country by July 10.
  - WWII: British Fleet Air Arm aircraft sink the Vichy French destroyer Chevalier Paul off Syria.
- June 18 – The German–Turkish Treaty of Friendship is signed between Nazi Germany and Turkey, in Ankara.
- June 20
  - The United States Army Air Corps becomes the United States Army Air Forces, with the earlier name reserved solely for the new USAAF's logistics and training elements.
  - Walt Disney's live-action/animated feature The Reluctant Dragon is released.
- June 22
  - WWII: Operation Barbarossa: Nazi Germany (with allies) invades the Soviet Union and declares war on it. Winston Churchill promises all possible British assistance to the Soviet Union in a worldwide broadcast: "Any man or state who fights against Nazidom will have our aid. Any man or state who marches with Hitler is our foe." Italy and Romania declare war on the Soviet Union.
  - WWII: The First Sisak Partisan Brigade, the first anti-fascist armed unit in occupied Europe, is founded by Yugoslav partisans near Sisak, Croatia.
  - June Uprising in Lithuania: A Provisional Government of Lithuania is established by the Lithuanian Activist Front, in an attempt to liberate Lithuania from Soviet occupation.
  - Rapid escalation of the Holocaust in Lithuania: Between now and the end of the year, an estimated 190,000-195,000 out of 210,000 Lithuanian Jews will be massacred, killing an estimated 95% of the nation's Jewish population.
- June 23 – WWII: Hungary and Slovakia declare war on the Soviet Union.
- June 24
  - Rainiai massacre: Approximately 80 political prisoners are killed by the NKVD in Lithuania.
  - The Soviet Information Bureau, predecessor of RIA Novosti, is founded.
- June 25 – WWII: Finland (as a co-belligerent with Germany) attacks the Soviet Union, starting the Continuation War.
- June 25–29 – The Holocaust: Kaunas pogrom – Thousands of Jews are massacred in Lithuania by local partisans and invading German forces.
- June 28 – WWII: Albania declares war on the Soviet Union.
- June 28–30 – The Holocaust: Iași pogrom – "At least 13,266" Romanian Jews are massacred by local governmental forces.
- June 29 – WWII: Hitler's second-in-command, Reichsmarshall Hermann Göring, is appointed as Hitler's successor in a written decree. The decree will come into effect, should Hitler die in the middle of the war. (The decree becomes void in April 1945, after Göring tries to assume power while Hitler is still alive, leading to Göring's expulsion from the Nazi Party.)

=== July ===
- July – The British Army's Special Air Service is formed.
- July 1
  - Commercial television is authorized by the Federal Communications Commission in the United States.
    - NBC Television begins commercial operation on WNBT, on Channel 1. The world's first legal TV commercial, for Bulova watches, occurs at 2:29 PM over WNBT, before a baseball game between the Brooklyn Dodgers and Philadelphia Phillies. The 10-second spot displays a picture of a clock superimposed on a map of the United States, accompanied by the voice-over "America runs on Bulova time." As a one-off special, the first quiz show called "Uncle Bee" is telecast on WNBT's inaugural broadcast day, followed later the same day by Ralph Edwards hosting the second game show broadcast on U.S. television, Truth or Consequences, as simulcast on radio and TV and sponsored by Ivory Soap. Weekly broadcasts of the show commence in 1956, with Bob Barker.
    - CBS Television begins commercial operation on New York station WCBW (modern-day WCBS-TV), on Channel 2.
  - WWII:
    - German forces capture Riga in Latvia.
    - Germany and Italy recognize the Japanese-sponsored Reorganized National Government of the Republic of China under Wang Jingwei as the legitimate government of China.
- July 2 – WWII:
  - A German SS unit arrives in Vilnius, Lithuania, and begins the Ponary massacre, the systematic execution of up to 100,000 people over the next three years.
  - The Empire of Japan calls up 1 million men for military service.
- July 3 – WWII: Joseph Stalin, in his first address since the German invasion, calls upon the Soviet people to carry out a "scorched earth" policy of resistance to the bitter end.
- July 4 – Massacre of Lviv professors: Polish scientists and writers are murdered by Nazi German troops in the occupied Polish city of Lwów.
- July 5 – WWII:
  - Operation Barbarossa: German troops reach the Dnieper River.
  - British troopship SS Anselm is torpedoed and sunk by German submarine U-96 in the Atlantic Ocean, with the loss of around 250 out of about 1,310 on board.
- July 5–31: Ecuadorian–Peruvian War is fought. Peru retains captured disputed territory of Ecuador.
- July 7
  - Uprising in Serbia: The Communist Party of Yugoslavia raises an uprising against the Nazi occupation, beginning when Žikica Jovanović Španac kills two gendarmes in the village of Bela Crkva.
  - WWII: American forces take over the defense of Iceland from the British.
- July 10 – The Holocaust: Jedwabne pogrom: Local ethnic Poles massacre at least 340 Jewish residents of Jedwabne, in occupied Poland. The Jewish residents are locked in a barn and the barn set on fire.
- July 11 – The Northern Rhodesian Labour Party holds its first congress in Nkana.
- July 13
  - WWII: An uprising in Montenegro against the Axis powers starts, the second popular uprising in Europe (the first being the "February strike" of February 25 (above) in the Netherlands).
  - Clemens August Graf von Galen, Catholic Bishop of Münster in Germany, preaches the first of 3 sermons against Nazi brutality.
- July 14 – WWII: Vichy France signs armistice terms ending all fighting in Syria and Lebanon.
- July 23 – WWII: Italian aircraft damage the British destroyer HMS Fearless which has to be sunk in the Mediterranean.
- July 25 – Postal codes in Germany are introduced.
- July 26 – WWII:
  - In response to the Japanese occupation of French Indochina, U.S. President Franklin D. Roosevelt orders the seizure of all Japanese assets in the United States.
  - General Douglas MacArthur is named commander of all U.S. forces in the Philippines; the Philippines Army is ordered nationalized by President Roosevelt.
- July 28–August 29 – The Holocaust: Pripyat Marshes massacres – Nazi German troops kill more than 17,000 Soviet citizens, chiefly Jewish civilians.
- July 29 – The Vichy Regime signs the Protocol Concerning Joint Defense and Joint Military Cooperation with the Empire of Japan, giving the Japanese a total of 8 airfields, allowing them greater troop presence, and the use of the Indochinese financial system, in return for continued French autonomy.
- July 30 – WWII: Glina massacre of July–August 1941 – The Ustaše brutally kill 200 Serbs inside a Serbian Orthodox church in Glina, Croatia, with a total of 700–1,200 being killed in the area of the next few days.
- July 31 – WWII: The Holocaust: Under instructions from Adolf Hitler, Nazi official Hermann Göring orders S.S. General Reinhard Heydrich to "submit to me as soon as possible a general plan of the administrative material and financial measures necessary for carrying out the desired Final Solution of the Jewish question."

=== August ===
- August – The Political Warfare Executive is formed in the United Kingdom to disseminate propaganda to Germany and its occupied countries.
- August 1 – The Willys MB U.S. Army Jeep is first produced.
- August 5 – The Provisional Government of Lithuania is dissolved.
- August 6 – Six-year-old Elaine Esposito goes to have an appendix operation in Florida and lapses into a coma, dying 37 years later, still comatose.
- August 7 – WWII: British submarine HMS Severn sinks an Italian Marconi-class submarine.
- August 9 – Franklin D. Roosevelt and Winston Churchill meet on board ship at Naval Station Argentia, Newfoundland. The Atlantic Charter (released August 14), setting goals for postwar international cooperation, is created as a result.
- August 16
  - The Holocaust: Units of the Wehrmacht and the Einsatzgruppen (as part of Operation Barbarossa) start killing Jewish children, signalling the start of the Jewish Genocide.
  - HMS Mercury Royal Navy Signals School and Combined Signals School opens at Leydene, near Petersfield, Hampshire, England.
- August 19 – The Tiraspol Agreement is signed between Germany and Romania.
- August 21 – In revenge for the execution two days earlier of French Resistance member Samuel Tyszelman, communist activist Pierre Georges (with others) shoots and kills a member of the German military in occupied Paris, initiating a cycle of assassinations and retribution that will claim hundreds of lives.
- August 25 – WWII: The Anglo-Soviet invasion of Iran to secure the Persian Corridor and oilfields begins.
- August 27 – WWII: Kamianets-Podilskyi massacre, 23,600 Jews are shot dead by Einsatzgruppen troops and local collaborators in Ukraine.
- August 28 – WWII: Soviet evacuation of Tallinn – German troops capture Tallinn, Estonia from the Soviet Union, while attacks on the evacuating Soviet ships leave more than 12,000 dead in one of the bloodiest naval battles of the war. German forces will capture the entire Estonian territory by December 6.
- August 29
  - WWII: The Government of National Salvation, a Serb puppet state of the Axis powers, is established by General Milan Nedić in Nazi-occupied Serbia in Belgrade, under military commander Heinrich Danckelmann; the regime includes 15 Ministers.
  - Robert Menzies resigns as Prime Minister of Australia, after losing the support of his party. He will not return to the Prime Ministership until 1949. Arthur Fadden, leader of the Country Party, consequently becomes Prime Minister, while former Prime Minister Billy Hughes replaces Menzies as UAP leader.
- August 30
  - German troopship Bahia Laura is sunk by British submarine HMS Trident (N52) in the North Sea; 450 are killed.
  - Germany and Romania sign another treaty, the Tighina Agreement.
- August 31
  - WWII (Uprising in Serbia): Battle of Loznica: Chetniks capture the town of Loznica in Nazi-occupied Serbia.
  - The Great Gildersleeve debuts on NBC Radio in the United States.

=== September ===
- September
  - The word "Teenager" is first recorded in print as a singular conjoined noun, in Popular Science magazine (U.S.)
  - WWII: The Royal Scots Greys, stationed in the Middle East, receive their first tanks, being the last of the cavalry regiments of the British Army to have abandoned horses for combat operations.
- September 3 – The Holocaust: SS-Hauptsturmführer Karl Fritzsch first uses the pesticide Zyklon B to execute Soviet prisoners of war en masse at Auschwitz concentration camp; eventually it will be used to kill about 1.2 million people.
- September 6 – The Holocaust: The requirement to wear a yellow badge with the Star of David and the word "Jew" (Jude) inscribed, is extended to all Jews over the age of 6 in German-occupied areas.
- September 8 – WWII: Siege of Leningrad – German forces begin a siege against the Soviet Union's second-largest city, Leningrad. Stalin orders the Volga Germans deported to Siberia.
- September 11
  - WWII: Charles Lindbergh delivers his Des Moines speech at an America First Committee rally in Des Moines, Iowa, accusing "the British, the Jewish, and the Roosevelt administration" of leading the United States toward war. Widespread condemnation of Lindbergh follows.
  - The Medvedev Forest massacre, committed by the NKVD, of political prisoners takes place, at the Oryol Prison in the Soviet Union.
- September 12
  - WWII: The first snowfall is reported on the Russian front.
  - Franklin Roosevelt gives one of his fireside chats, on the USS Greer incident.
- September 14 – The State of Vermont "declares war" on Germany, by defining the United States to be in "armed conflict", in order to extend a wartime bonus to Vermonters in the service.
- September 15 – The Estonian Self-Administration, headed by Hjalmar Mäe, is appointed by the German military administration.
- September 16 – Rezā Shāh of Iran is forced to resign in favor of his son Mohammad Reza Pahlavi, under pressure from the United Kingdom and the Soviet Union, concluding the Anglo-Soviet invasion of Iran.
- September 16–30 – The Nikolaev massacre takes place in Mykolaiv (Soviet Union); 35,782 men, women and children, mostly Jews, are killed by Einsatzgruppe D and local collaborators.
- September 22 – The town of Reshetylivka in the Soviet Union is occupied by German forces.
- September 23 – The 1941 Texas hurricane makes landfall near Bay City, Texas, causing extensive damage and flooding in Galveston and Houston.
- September 27
  - WWII: The National Liberation Front (Greece) (the main Greek Resistance movement) is established, and Georgios Siantos is appointed its first acting leader.
  - The first liberty ship, the SS Patrick Henry, is launched at Baltimore.
- September 28 – WWII: The Drama Uprising against the Bulgarian occupation in northern Greece begins.
- September 29 – WWII: The Moscow Conference begins: neutral U.S. representative Averell Harriman and British representative Lord Beaverbrook meet with Soviet foreign minister Vyacheslav Molotov to arrange urgent assistance for Russia.
- September 29–30 – The Holocaust: Babi Yar massacre – German troops, assisted by Ukrainian police and local collaborators, kill 33,771 Jews in Kyiv.

=== October ===
- Mid-October – The first P-38E Lightning fighter is produced by Lockheed in the United States.
- October 1
  - The Holocaust: The Nazi German Majdanek concentration camp (Konzentrationslager Lublin) opens in occupied Poland, on the outskirts of the town of Lublin. Between October 1941 and July 1944, at least 200,000 people will be killed in the camp.
  - The New Zealand Division of the Royal Navy becomes the Royal New Zealand Navy.
- October 2
  - WWII: Operation Typhoon begins, as Germany launches an all-out offensive against Moscow.
  - Tudeh Party of Iran is founded.
- October 5 – The Holocaust: In Berdychiv (Ukraine), 20–30,000 Jews are shot dead.
- October 7 – John Curtin becomes the 14th Prime Minister of Australia, following the defeat of Arthur Fadden's Country/UAP Coalition government, on the floor of the House of Representatives.
- October 8 – WWII: In their invasion of the Soviet Union, Germany reaches the Sea of Azov, with the capture of Mariupol (Ukraine).
- October 11 – WWII: Armed insurgents from the People's Liberation Army of Macedonia attack Axis-occupied zones in the city of Prilep, beginning the National Liberation War of Macedonia.
- October 11–12 – Fire destroys a Firestone Tire and Rubber Company plant in Fall River, Massachusetts, consuming 15,850 tons of rubber, and causing a setback to the United States military effort.
- October 13 – The Holocaust: Heinrich Himmler instructs SS and Police Leader Odilo Globocnik to begin construction of Bełżec, the first of the Operation Reinhard extermination camps.
- October 15 – WWII: British submarine HMS Torbay bombards the port of Apollonia, Cyrenaica in Italian Libya.
- October 16 – WWII: The Soviet government moves to Kuibyshev (modern Samara), but Stalin remains in Moscow.
- October 17 – WWII: Destroyer USS Kearny is torpedoed and damaged near Iceland, killing 11 sailors (the first American military casualties of the war, in which the US is at this time neutral).
- October 18 – General Hideki Tōjō becomes the 40th Prime Minister of Japan.
- October 21 – WWII: Kragujevac massacre – German soldiers and local auxiliaries massacre more than 2,000 civilian men at Kragujevac in Nazi-occupied Serbia.
- October 25 – WWII: Fighter ace Franz von Werra, who returned to Germany on April 18 having escaped from Allied imprisonment, disappears during a flight over the North Sea.
- October 29 – The Holocaust: Kaunas massacre of October 29, 1941 – Over 9,200 Lithuanian Jews are shot dead.
- October 30
  - WWII: Franklin D. Roosevelt, President of the United States, approves US$1 billion in Lend-Lease aid to the Soviet Union.
  - The Holocaust: 1,500 Jews from Pidhaitsi (in western Ukraine) are sent by the Nazis to the Bełżec extermination camp.
- October 31
  - WWII: Destroyer USS Reuben James, on convoy escort, is accidentally torpedoed by a German U-boat near Iceland, killing more than 100 United States Navy sailors.
  - The last day of carving on Mount Rushmore in South Dakota.

=== November ===
- November 5 – WWII: The United States holds peace talks with Japan.
- November 6 – WWII: Soviet leader Joseph Stalin addresses the Soviet Union for only the second time during his three-decade rule (the first time was earlier this year on July 2). He states that 350,000 Soviet troops have been killed in German attacks, but that the Germans have lost 4.5 million soldiers (a gross exaggeration), and that Soviet victory is near.
- November 7 – WWII: The Soviet hospital ship Armenia is sunk by German aircraft while evacuating refugees, wounded military and the staff of several Crimean hospitals. It is estimated that more than 5,000 die in the sinking.
- November 10 – In a speech at the Mansion House, London, Winston Churchill promises "should the United States become involved in war with Japan, the British declaration will follow within the hour".
- November 12 – WWII:
  - As the Battle of Moscow begins, temperatures around Moscow drop to −12 °C, and the Soviet Union launches ski troops for the first time, against the freezing German forces near the city.
  - Soviet cruiser Chervona Ukraina is hit three times in the Severnaya Bay by bombs from German Junkers Ju 87 Stuka dive bombers from II./StG 77 during the Siege of Sevastopol.
- November 14
  - WWII: British aircraft carrier HMS Ark Royal sinks under tow off Gibraltar, after being torpedoed the previous day by German submarine U-81.
  - The Holocaust: In Slonim (Byelorussian SSR), German forces engaged in Operation Barbarossa murder 9,000 Jews.
- November 17 – WWII: Joseph Grew, the United States ambassador to Japan, cables to Washington, D.C., a warning that Japan may strike suddenly and unexpectedly.
- November 18 – WWII: Operation Crusader, a British Eighth Army operation to relieve the Siege of Tobruk in North Africa, begins.
- November 19 – WWII: Battle between HMAS Sydney and German auxiliary cruiser Kormoran – Both commerce raiding German auxiliary cruiser Kormoran and Australian cruiser HMAS Sydney sink following a battle off the coast of Western Australia. There are no survivors from the 645 Australian sailors aboard Sydney.
- November 21 – The live blues radio program King Biscuit Time is broadcast for the first time on KFFA in Helena, Arkansas; it will attain its 17,000th broadcast in 2014 making it the longest-running daily American radio broadcast.
- November 22 – WWII: British heavy cruiser HMS Devonshire sinks commerce raiding German auxiliary cruiser Atlantis in the South Atlantic, ending the longest warship cruise of the war (622 days without in-port replenishment or repair).
- November 26 – WWII:
  - The Hull note (Outline of Proposed Basis for Agreement Between the United States and Japan), named for Secretary of State Cordell Hull, is delivered to the Empire of Japan by the United States.
  - A task force of 6 aircraft carriers, commanded by Japanese Vice Admiral Chūichi Nagumo, leaves Hitokapu Bay for Pearl Harbor, under strict radio silence.
- November 27
  - WWII: Germans reach their closest approach to Moscow. They are subsequently frozen by cold weather and stopped by attacks by the Soviets.
  - A group of young men stop traffic on U.S. Highway 99 south of Yreka, California, handing out fliers proclaiming the establishment of the State of Jefferson.
- November 30 and December 8 – Rumbula massacre: Nazi forces kill approximately 24,000 Latvian Jews and 1,000 German Jews outside of Riga.

=== December ===
- December 1 – WWII:
  - Fiorello La Guardia, Mayor of New York City and Director of the Office of Civilian Defense, signs Administrative Order 9, creating the Civil Air Patrol under the authority of the United States Army Air Forces.
  - A state of emergency is declared in British Malaya and the Straits Settlements.
- December 2 – WWII: The code message "Climb Mount Niitaka" is transmitted to the Japanese task force, indicating that negotiations have broken down and that the attack on Pearl Harbor is to be carried out according to plan.
- December 4 – The State of Jefferson is declared in Yreka, California, with a judge, John Childs, as governor.
- December 5 – WWII: The United Kingdom declares war on Finland, Hungary and Romania.
- December 6 – WWII:
  - Soviet counterattacks begin against German troops encircling Moscow. The Heer is subsequently pushed back over 200 mi (320 km).
  - British submarine HMS Perseus is mined off Cephalonia.
- December 7 (December 8 – 3:18 a.m., Japan Standard Time) – WWII:
  - Attack on Pearl Harbor: Aircraft flying from Imperial Japanese Navy carriers launch a surprise attack on the United States fleet at Pearl Harbor in Hawaii, thus drawing the United States into World War II. The attack begins at 7:55 a.m. Hawaiian Standard Time, and is announced on radio stations in the U.S. at about 11:26 p.m. PST (19.26 GMT).
  - The Japanese declaration of war on the United States and the British Empire is published in Japanese evening newspapers, but not formally delivered to the U.S. until the following day. Canada declares war on Japan.
  - Adolf Hitler makes his Nacht und Nebel decree, declaring that all political prisoners and those involved in both German resistance to Nazism and resistance to Nazism throughout German-occupied Europe are to be apprehended by the Gestapo, Sicherheitsdienst and other security forces under Heinrich Himmler's control.
  - Tobruk's British and Commonwealth garrison is relieved after Axis forces under Rommel withdraw.
- December 8
  - WWII: The Battle of Hong Kong begins shortly after 8:00 a.m. (local time), less than 8 hours after the attack on Pearl Harbor, when Japanese forces invade Hong Kong, which is defended by British, Canadian and local troops. The United Kingdom officially declares war on the Empire of Japan.
  - WWII: The Japanese invade the Shanghai International Settlement, to occupy the British and the American sectors, after the attack on Pearl Harbor.
  - WWII: The Japanese invasion of the Philippines begins 10 hours after the attack on Pearl Harbor, when Japanese forces invade Luzon and destroy U.S. aircraft on Clark Field.
  - WWII: President of the United States Franklin D. Roosevelt delivers his "Infamy Speech" to a Joint session of the United States Congress at 12:30 p.m. EST (17.30 GMT). Transmitted live over all four major national networks, it attracts the largest audience ever for an American radio broadcast, over 81% of homes. Within an hour, Congress agrees to the President's request for a United States declaration of war upon Japan, and he signs it at 4:10 p.m.
  - WWII: Australia, New Zealand, The Netherlands, the Free French, Yugoslavia, Costa Rica, Cuba, El Salvador, Guatemala and Honduras also officially declare war on Japan, and the Republic of China declares war on the Axis powers.
  - WWII: Japanese forces attack British Malaya and Thailand.
  - WWII: The German advance on Moscow (Operation Typhoon) is suspended for the winter.
  - The Holocaust: The Nazi German Chełmno extermination camp opens in occupied Poland, near the village of Chełmno nad Nerem (Kulmhof) and the first mass gassing of Jews begins here when the SS use gas vans to murder people from the Łódź Ghetto. Between December 1941–April 1943 and June 1944–January 1945, at least 153,000 Jews will be killed in the camp.
- December 10 – WWII:
  - British battleship HMS Prince of Wales and battlecruiser HMS Repulse are sunk by Japanese aircraft in the South China Sea north of Singapore.
  - The Provisional Government of the Republic of Korea officially declares war on Japan.
- December 11 – WWII:
  - Germany and Italy declare war on the United States. The U.S. responds in kind.
  - Mildred Gillars ("Axis Sally") delivers her first propaganda broadcast to Allied troops.
- December 11–13 – WWII: Battle of Jitra: Japanese compel British troops to withdraw from their positions in Malaya.
- December 12 – WWII:
  - Hungary and Romania declare war on the United States.
  - British India declares war on the Empire of Japan.
  - The United States seizes the French liner SS Normandie.
  - The Kimura Detachment of the Japanese Imperial forces occupies Legaspi, Albay, Philippines.
- December 13
  - WWII: The United Kingdom, New Zealand and South Africa declare war on Bulgaria; Hungary declares war on the United States; and Honduras declares war on Germany and Italy.
  - WWII: The Battle of Cape Bon is fought off Cape Bon, Tunisia: Italian cruisers Alberico da Barbiano and Alberto di Giussano are sunk without loss to the Allies.
  - Sweden's low temperature record of −53 °C is set in a village within the Vilhelmina Municipality.
- December 14 – WWII: The Independent State of Croatia declares war on the United States and the United Kingdom.
- December 15 – WWII: At Drobytsky Yar, 15,000 Jews are shot dead by German troops.
- December 19 – WWII:
  - Hitler becomes Supreme Commander-in-Chief of the Nazi Army.
  - Raid on Alexandria: Italian Regia Marina divers on human torpedoes place limpet mines on ships of the British Royal Navy Mediterranean Fleet in port at Alexandria, Egypt, disabling battleships Queen Elizabeth and Valiant.
  - Twelve days after the Japanese raid on Pearl Harbor, the United States Naval Academy in Annapolis, Maryland, graduates its "Class of 1942" a semester early, so as to induct the graduating students without delay into the U.S. Navy and Marine Corps as officers, for immediate stationing in the war.
- December 21
  - Thailand and Japan sign a military alliance.
  - The Holocaust: The Stanisławów Ghetto is established in German-occupied Poland, initially with 20,000 Jews crowded inside; by Spring 1943 it will be pronounced Judenfrei (free of Jews).
- December 22 – WWII: The Arcadia Conference opens in Washington, D.C., the first meeting on military strategy between the heads of government of the United Kingdom and the United States, following the latter's entry into the war.
- December 23 – WWII: A second Japanese landing attempt on Wake Island is successful, and the American garrison surrenders, after a full night and morning of fighting.
- December 24 – WWII:
  - British forces capture Benghazi.
  - Dutch submarine HNLMS K XVI is the first Allied ship to sink a Japanese warship, sinking the destroyer Sagiri near Sarawak; K XVI is herself torpedoed the following day by Japanese submarine I-66.
- December 25 – WWII:
  - The Battle of Hong Kong ends after 17 days, with the surrender of the British Crown colony to the Japanese.
  - Admiral Émile Muselier seizes the archipelago of Saint Pierre and Miquelon off Newfoundland, the first part of France to be liberated by the Free French Forces.
- December 26 – WWII: Winston Churchill becomes the first British Prime Minister to address a joint session of the United States Congress.
- December 27 – WWII: British Commandos raid the Norwegian port of Måløy on Vågsøy island, causing the Germans to reinforce the garrison and defenses, drawing vital troops away from other areas.

=== Date unknown ===
- The Classic Comics series is launched in the United States, with a version of The Three Musketeers.
- Chosun Tire and Rubber Manufacture, predecessor of South Korean tire brand Hankook, is founded in Seoul (at this time part of the Empire of Japan).
- Factory Canteen, predecessor of multinational foodservice company Compass Group, is founded in England by Jack Bateman.

== Births ==
=== January ===
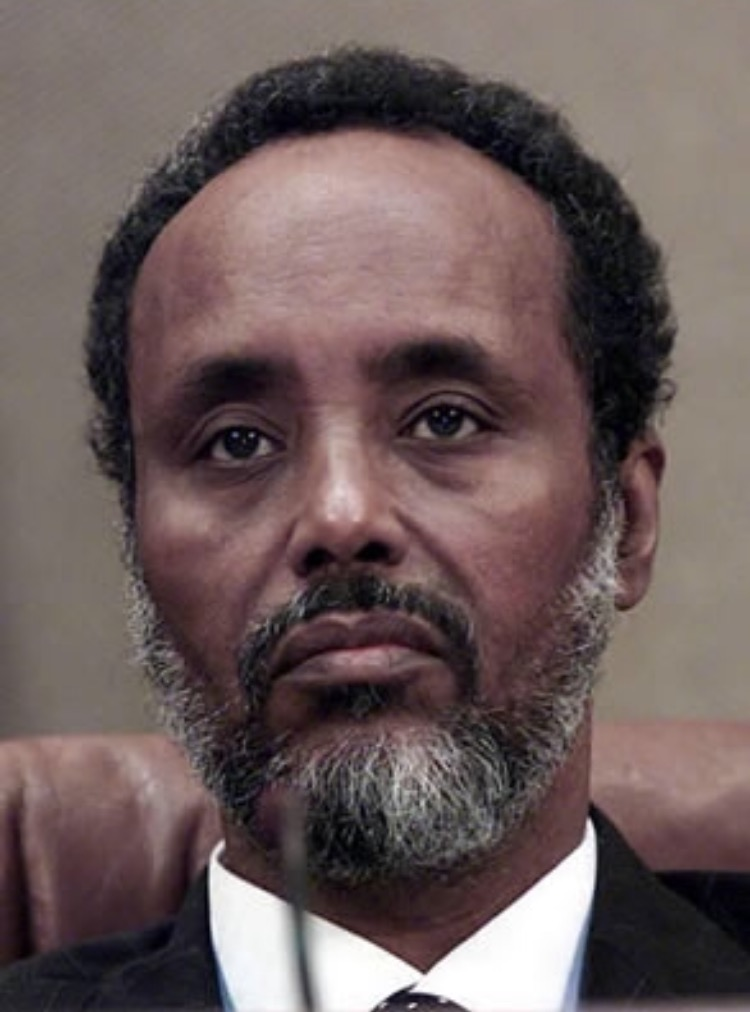
Abdiqasim Salad Hassan

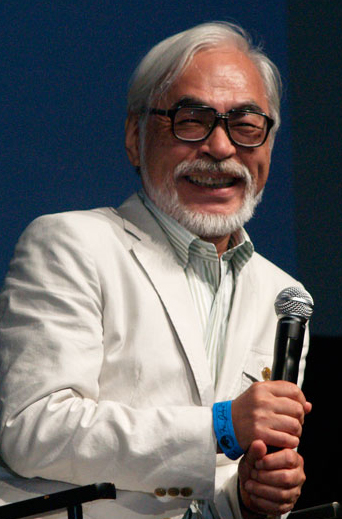
Hayao Miyazaki

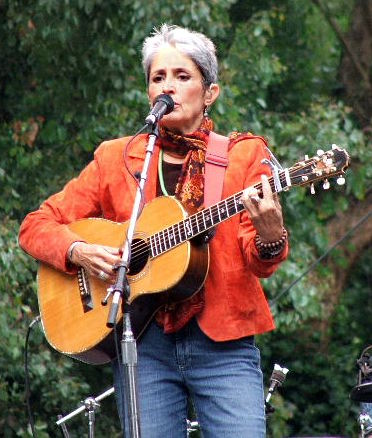
Joan Baez

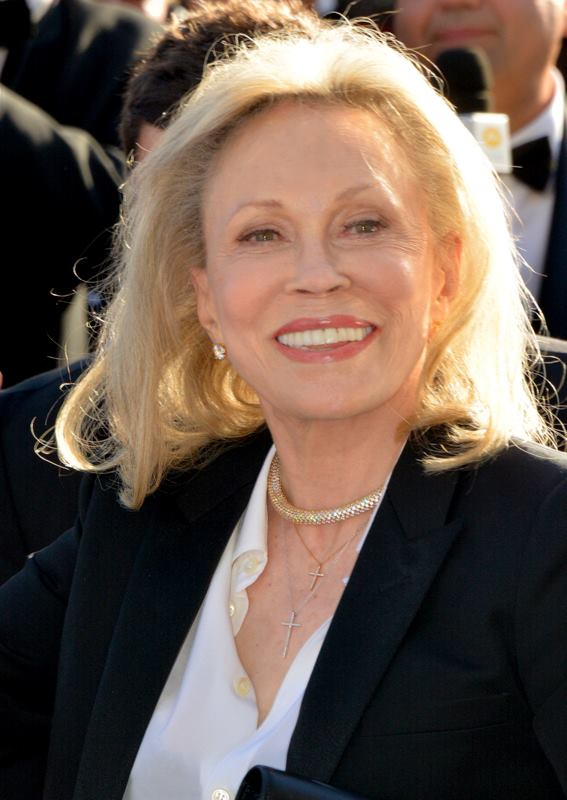
Faye Dunaway

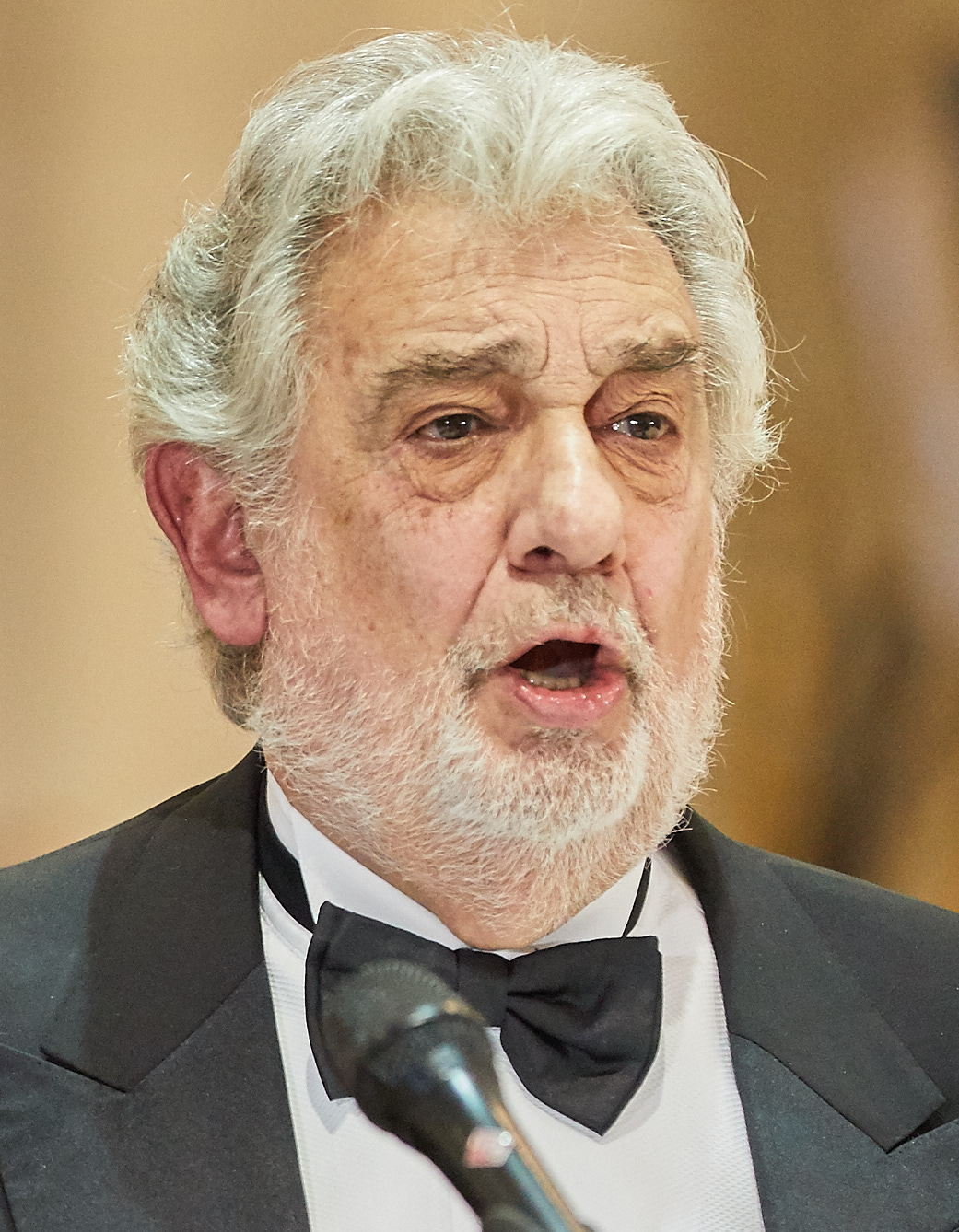
Plácido Domingo

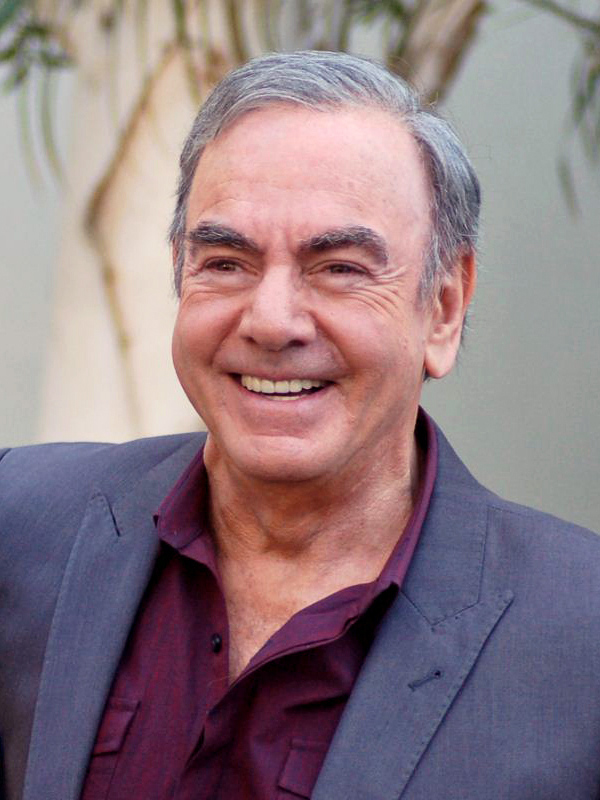
Neil Diamond

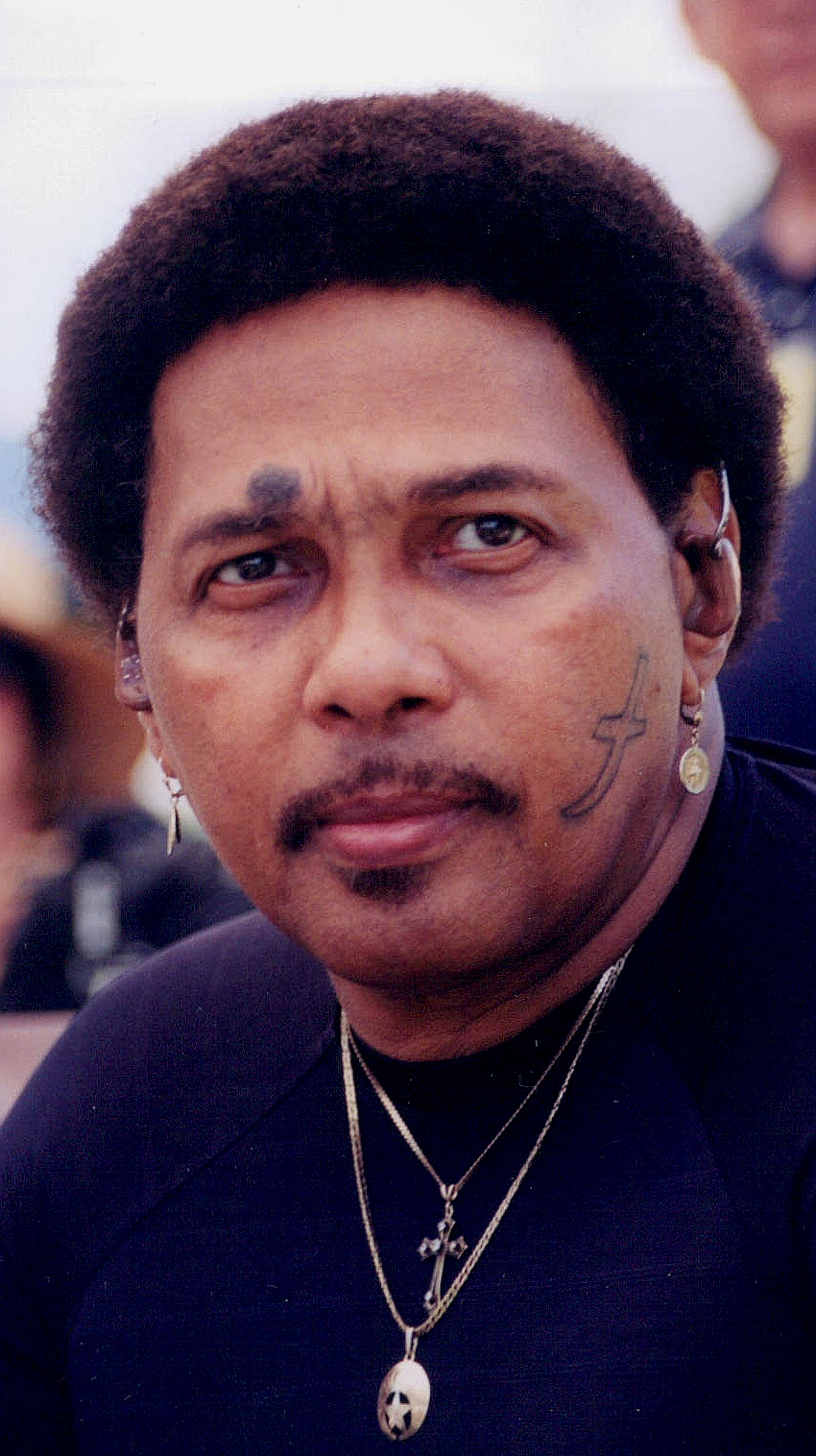
Aaron Neville

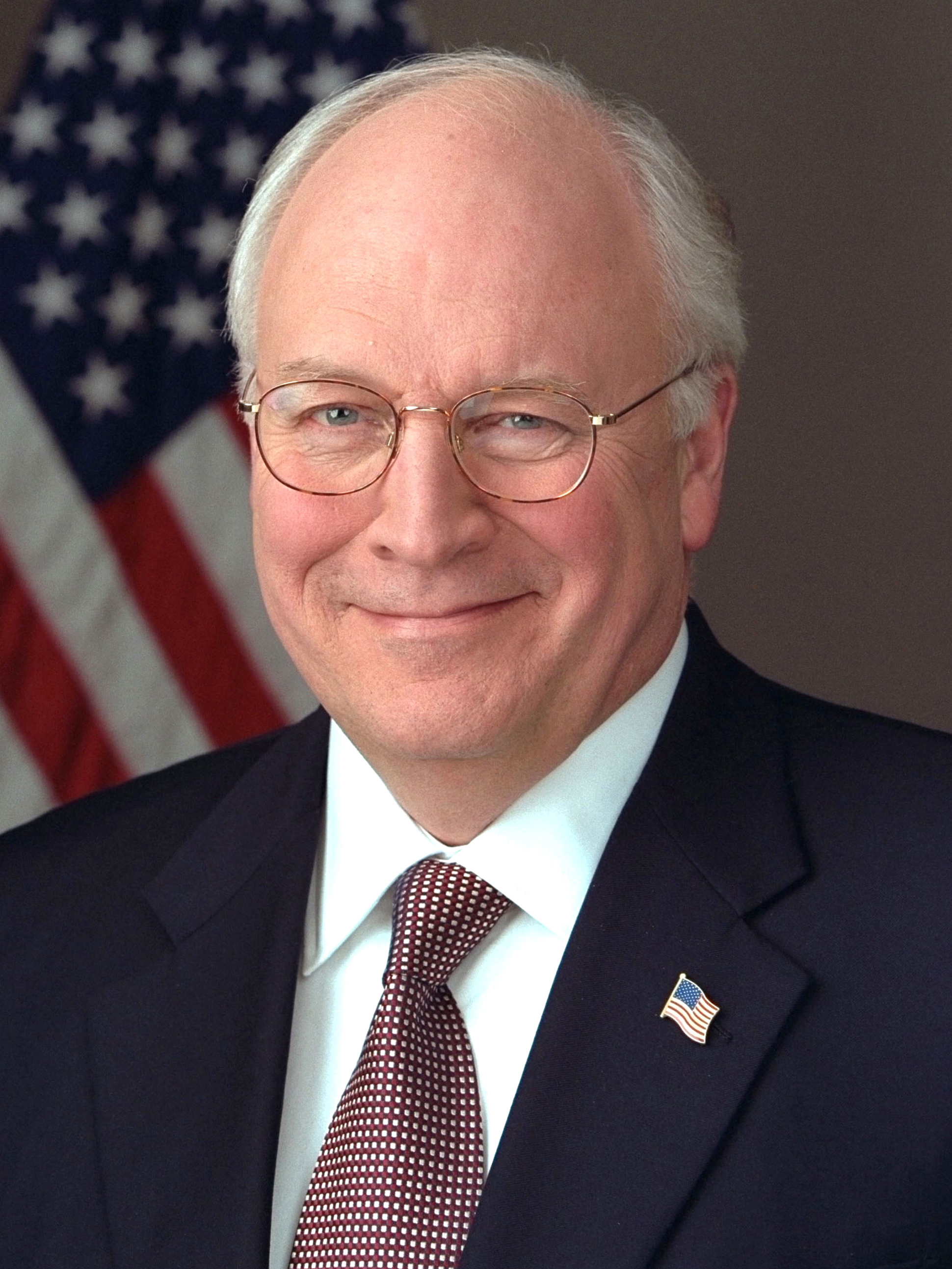
Dick Cheney

- January 1
  - Asrani, Indian actor and director (d. 2025)
  - Dardo Cabo, Argentine journalist, activist (d. 1977)
  - Martin Evans, British biologist, Nobel Prize in Physiology or Medicine laureate
  - Abdiqasim Salad Hassan, Somali politician, 5th President of Somalia
- January 3 – Shima Iwashita, Japanese actress
- January 4
  - Maureen Reagan, American political activist (d. 2001)
  - John Bennett Perry, American actor, singer and former model
- January 5
  - Harvey Hall, American businessman, politician (d. 2018)
  - Chuck McKinley, American tennis player (d. 1986)
  - Hayao Miyazaki, Japanese film director, screenwriter
  - Mansoor Ali Khan Pataudi, Indian cricketer (d. 2011)
- January 7
  - Iona Brown, British violinist, conductor (d. 2004)
  - Frederick D. Gregory, African-American astronaut
  - John E. Walker, British chemist, Nobel Prize laureate
- January 8
  - Graham Chapman, British comedian (Monty Python's Flying Circus) (d. 1989)
  - Boris Vallejo, Peruvian painter
- January 9
  - Joan Baez, American folk singer-songwriter and activist
  - Reza Sheikholeslami, Professor of Persian Studies (d. 2018)
- January 10 – José Greci, Italian actress (d. 2017)
- January 11
  - Gérson, Brazilian footballer
  - Pak Seung-zin, North Korean footballer (d. 2011)
  - Jimmy Velvit, American singer/songwriter
- January 12 – Long John Baldry, English singer (d. 2005)
- January 13 – Pasqual Maragall, Spanish politician
- January 14
  - Faye Dunaway, American actress
  - Milan Kučan, Slovenian politician, 1st President of Slovenia
- January 15 – Captain Beefheart, American singer (d. 2010)
- January 16 - Hyun Ki-young, South Korean writer
- January 17 – Mircea Snegur, 1st President of Moldova (d. 2023)
- January 18
  - Bobby Goldsboro, American pop and country singer-songwriter
  - David Ruffin, African-American singer (the Temptations) (d. 1991)
- January 19 – Pat Patterson, Canadian professional wrestler (d. 2020)
- January 20
  - Clift Tsuji, American politician (d. 2016)
  - Allan Young, English footballer (d. 2009)
- January 21
  - Plácido Domingo, Spanish opera singer, conductor and arts administrator
  - Richie Havens, African-American musician (d. 2013)
  - Ivan Putski, Polish-American professional wrestler and bodybuilder
- January 22 – Rintaro, Japanese anime director
- January 24
  - Neil Diamond, American singer-songwriter
  - Aaron Neville, African-American singer
  - Dan Shechtman, Israeli chemist, Nobel Prize laureate
- January 27
  - Bobby Hutcherson, African-American jazz musician (d. 2016)
  - Beatrice Tinsley, English astronomer (d. 1981)
- January 28 – Fernando Serena, Spanish footballer (d. 2018)
- January 29 – Robin Morgan, American poet, author, political theorist, feminist activist, journalist, lecturer and editor (d. 2026)
- January 30
  - Gregory Benford, American science fiction author and astrophysicist
  - Tineke Lagerberg, Dutch swimmer
  - Dick Cheney, 46th Vice President of the United States (d. 2025)
- January 31
  - Dick Gephardt, American politician
  - Eugène Terre'Blanche, South African farmer, pro-apartheid activist (d. 2010)
  - Jessica Walter, American actress (d. 2021)

=== February ===
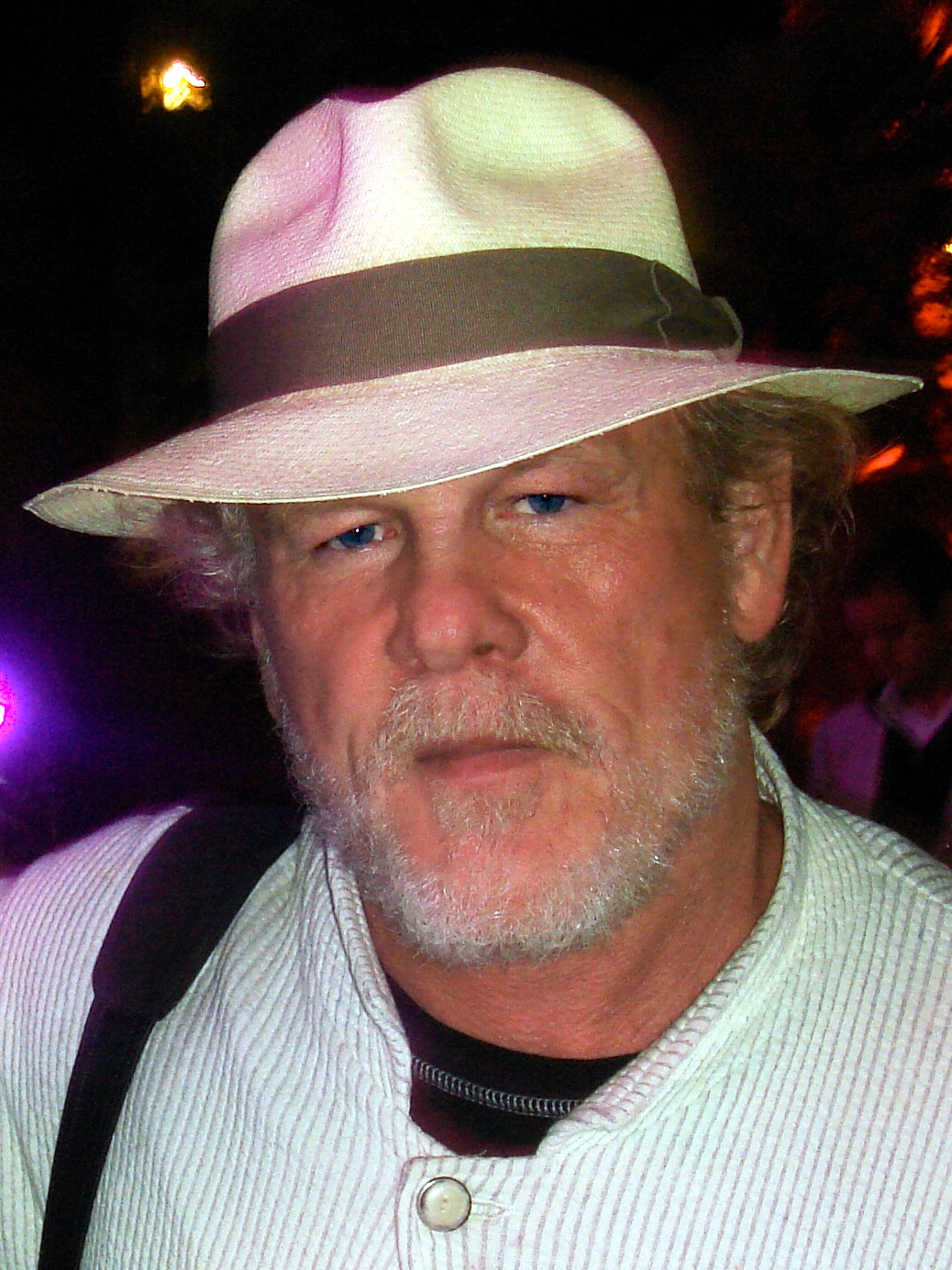
Nick Nolte

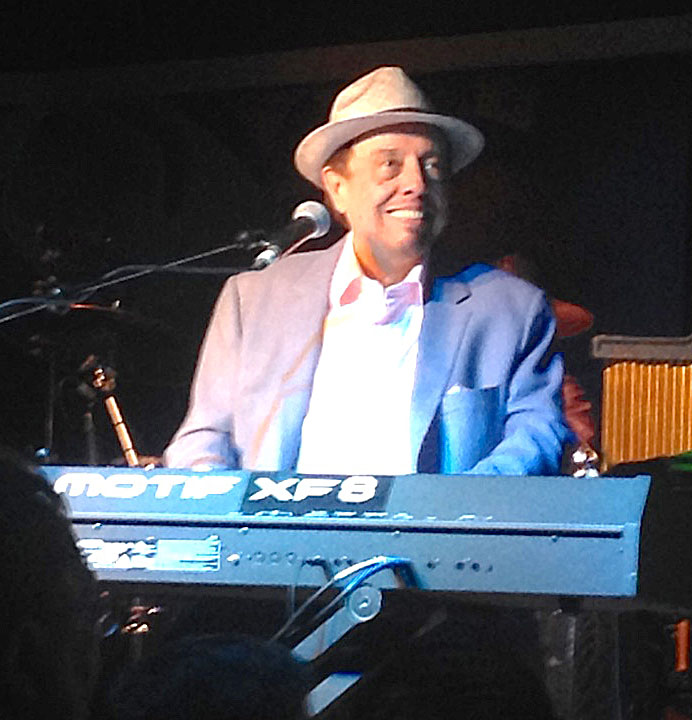
Sérgio Mendes

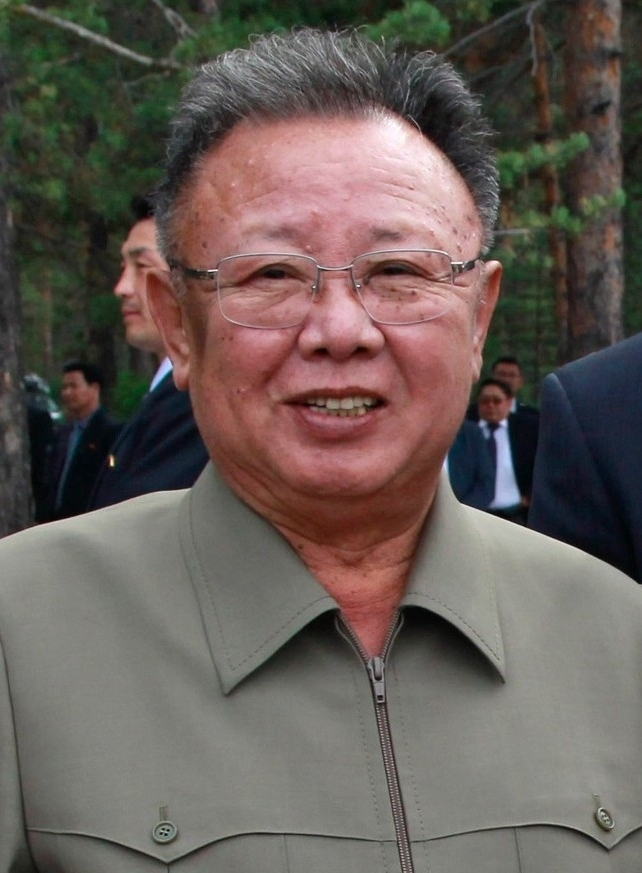
Kim Jong-il

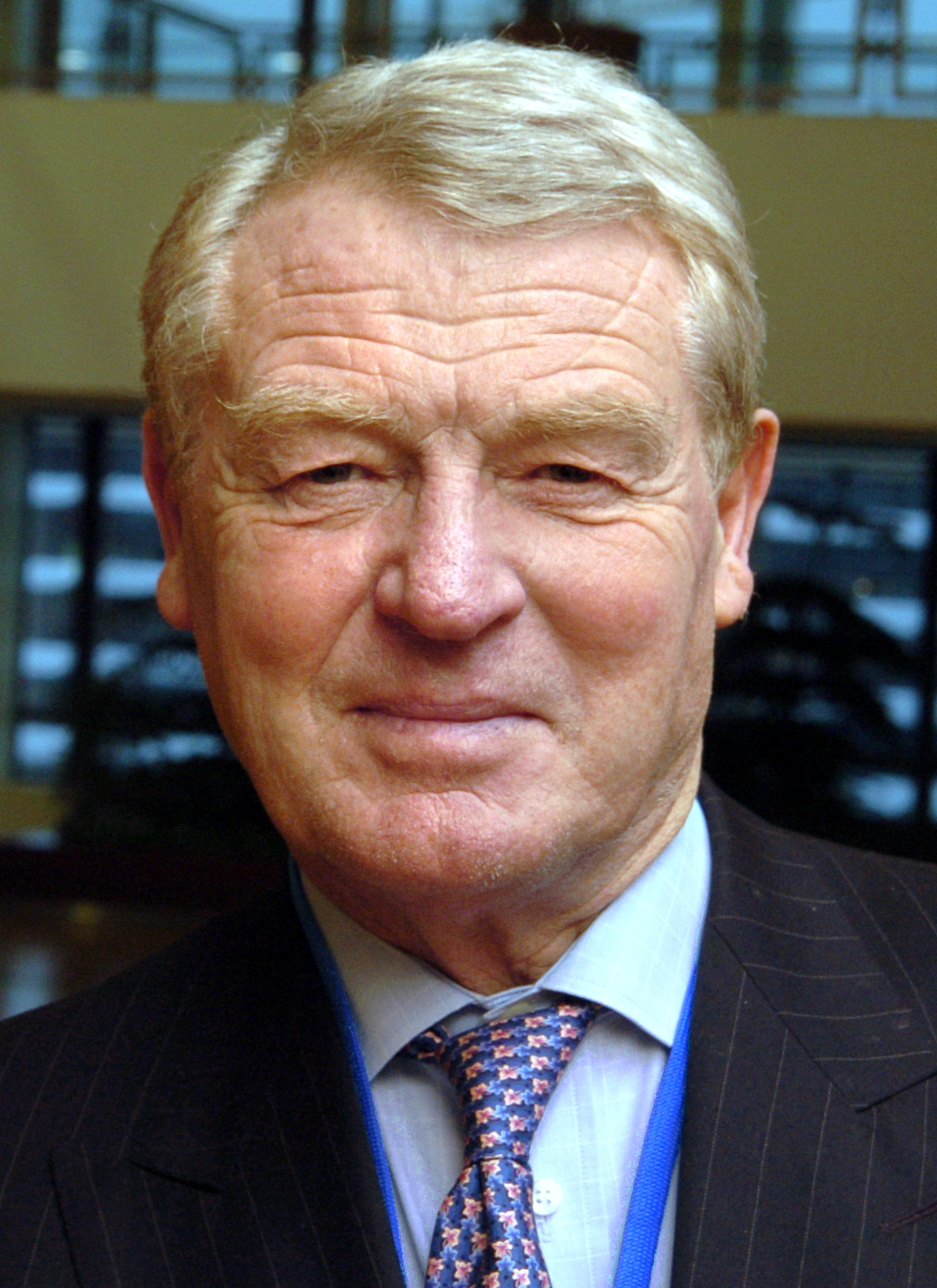
Paddy Ashdown

- February 1
  - Karl Dall, German comedian, singer and television presenter (d. 2020)
  - Anatoli Firsov, Soviet ice hockey player, three-time Olympic champion (d. 2000)
  - Jerry Spinelli, American author
- February 3
  - Dory Funk Jr., American professional wrestler (d. 2026)
  - Howard Phillips, American politician (d. 2013)
- February 4
  - Laisenia Qarase, Fijian politician (d. 2020)
  - John Steel, English drummer
- February 5
  - Stephen J. Cannell, American director, producer (d. 2010)
  - Henson Cargill, American country music singer (d. 2007)
  - David Selby, American actor
  - Barrett Strong, American Motown singer-songwriter (d. 2023)
  - Kaspar Villiger, Swiss politician
  - Cory Wells, American rock singer (Three Dog Night) (d. 2015)
- February 6 – Stephen Albert, American composer (d. 1992)
- February 8
  - Nick Nolte, American actor
  - Jagjit Singh, Indian singer, composer and musician (d. 2011)
- February 9 – Kermit Gosnell, American abortionist and serial killer (d. 2026)
- February 10 – Michael Apted, British film director (d. 2021)
- February 11
  - Sathischandra Edirisinghe, Sri Lankan actor, dramatist and director (d. 2025)
  - Sergio Mendes, Brazilian jazz musician (d. 2024)
  - Sonny Landham, American actor (d. 2017)
- February 12
  - Hubert Marcoux, Canadian solo sailor and author (d. 2009)
  - Naomi Uemura, Japanese adventurer (d. 1984)
- February 13
  - Sigmar Polke, German painter (d. 2010)
  - Bo Svenson, Swedish-American actor
- February 15 – Florinda Bolkan, Brazilian actress and model
- February 16 – Kim Jong Il, Leader of the Democratic People's Republic of Korea (d. 2011)
- February 18 – Irma Thomas, African-American singer
- February 19 – David Gross, American physicist, Nobel Prize laureate
- February 20 – Buffy Sainte-Marie, America singer
- February 22
  - Hipólito Mejía, Dominican politician, President of the Dominican Republic (2000–2004)
  - Yau Leung, Hong Kong photographer (d. 1997)
- February 27 – Paddy Ashdown, British politician, diplomat (d. 2018)

=== March ===
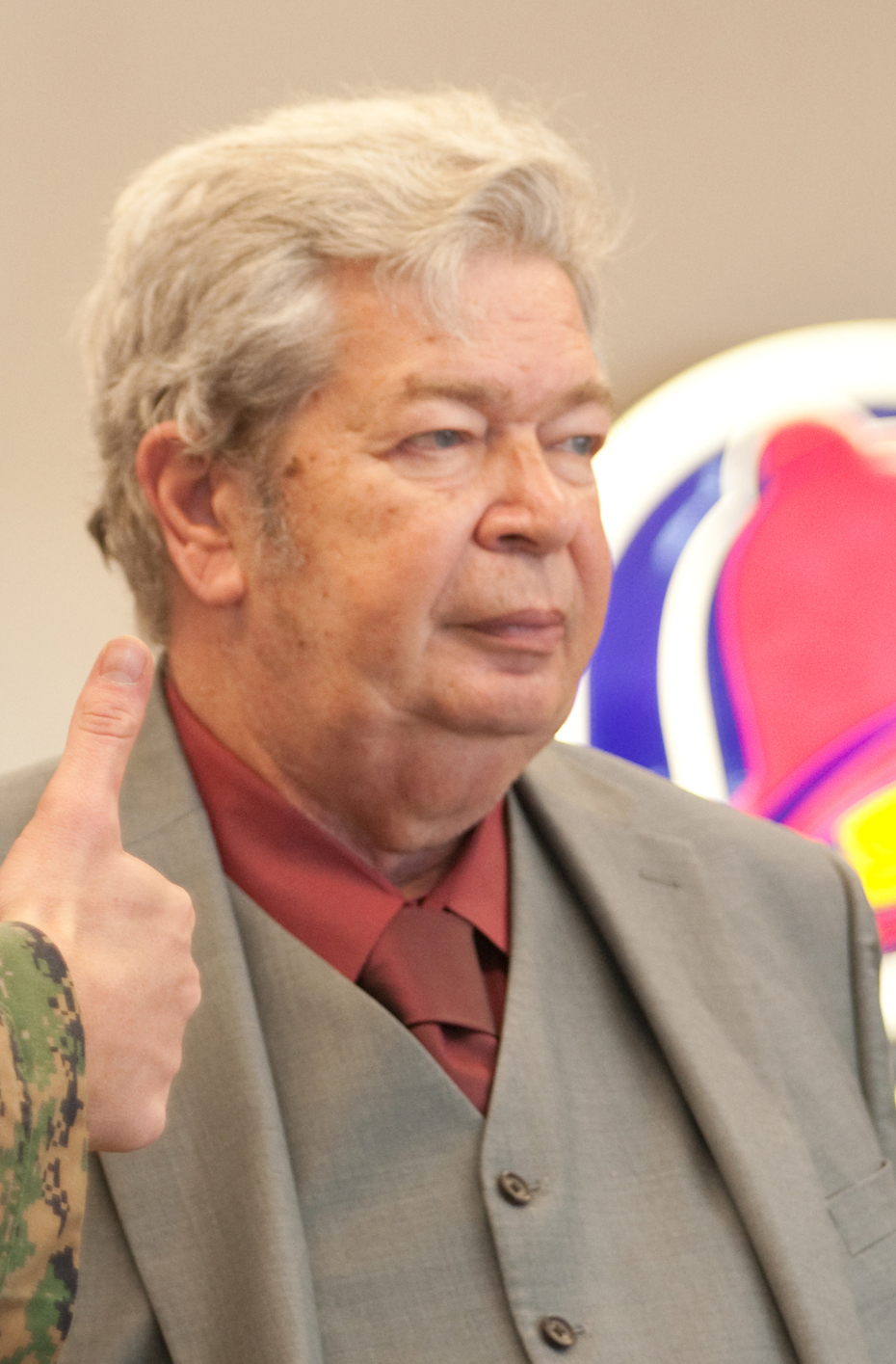
Richard Benjamin Harrison

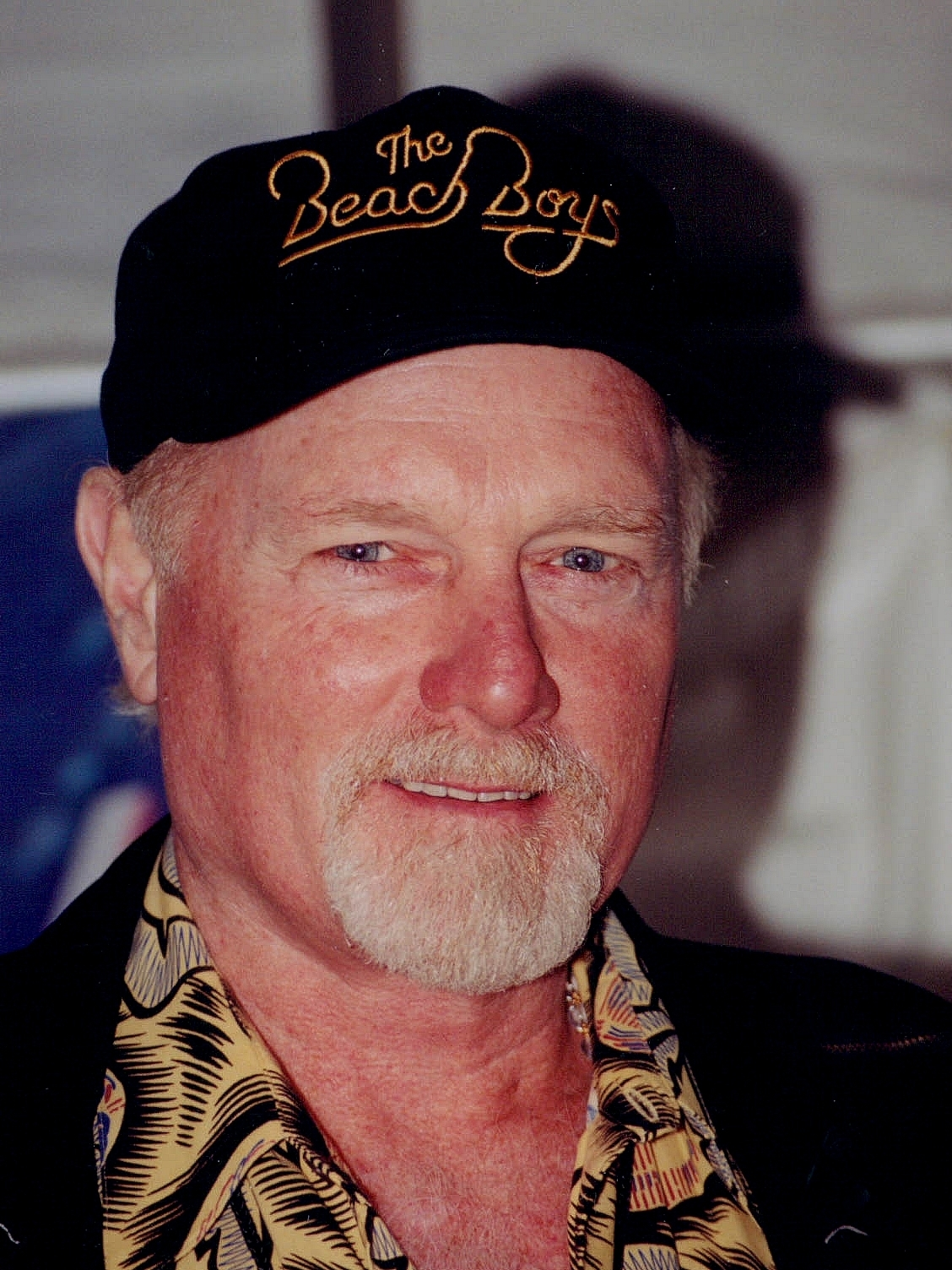
Mike Love

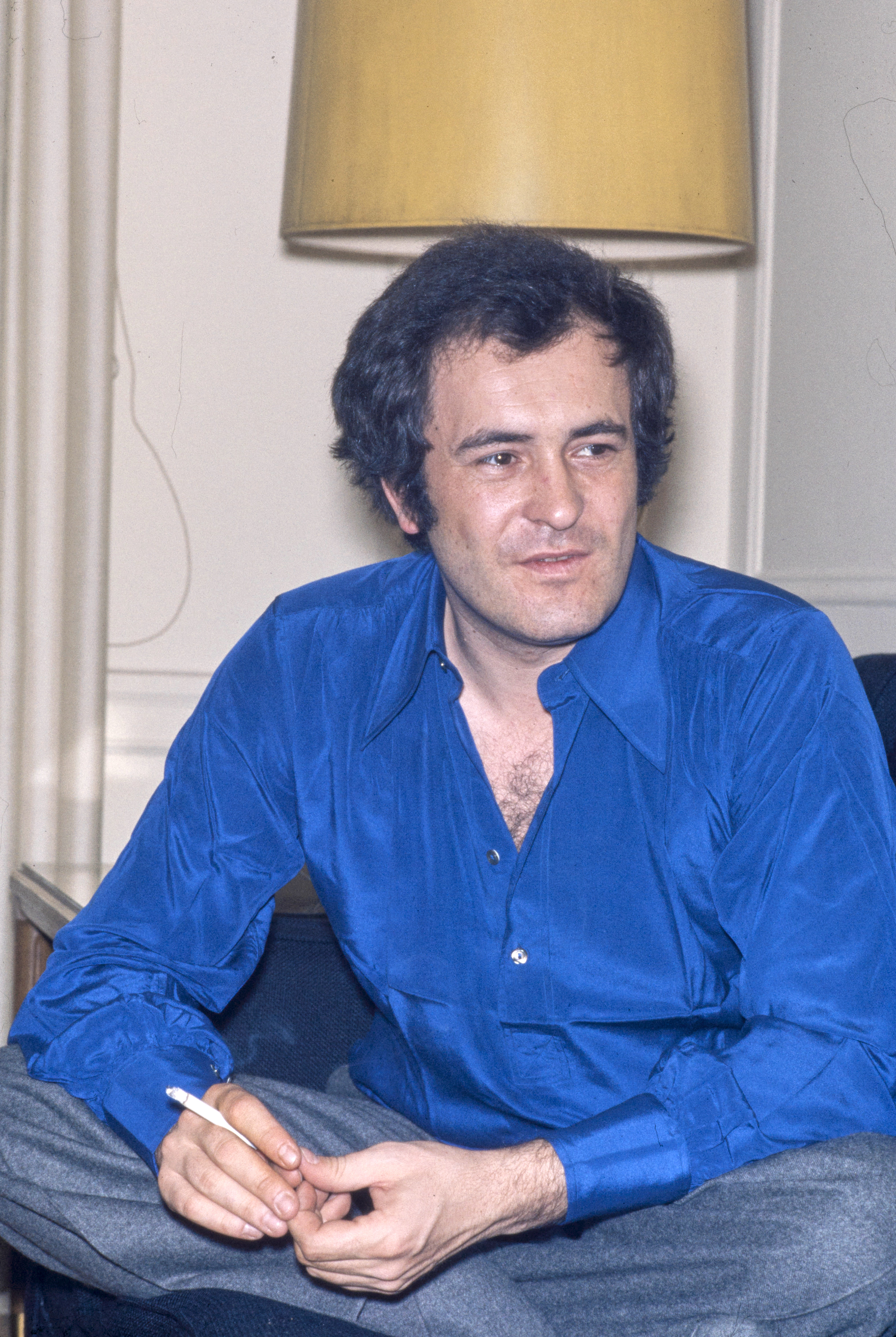
Bernardo Bertolucci

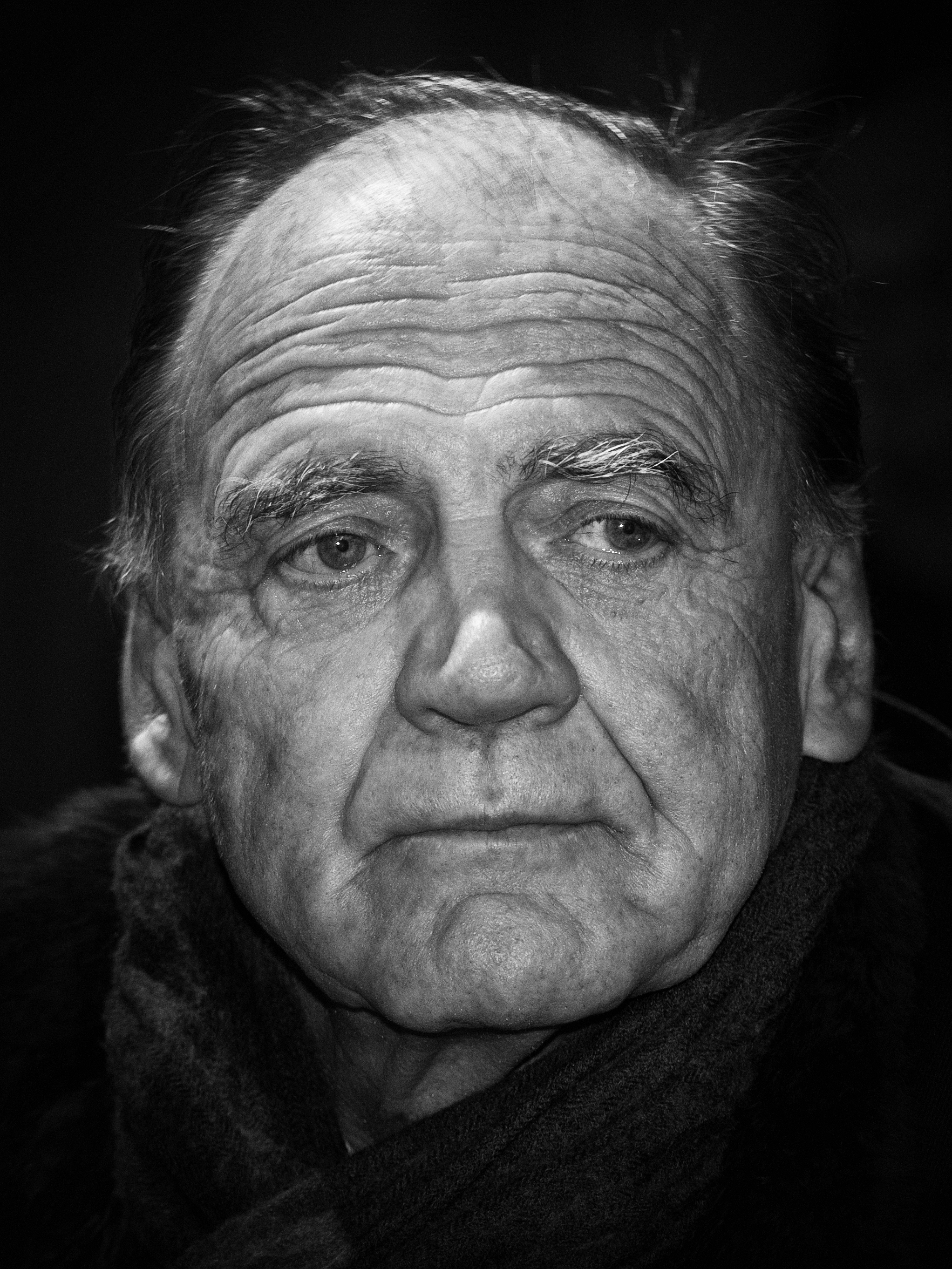
Bruno Ganz

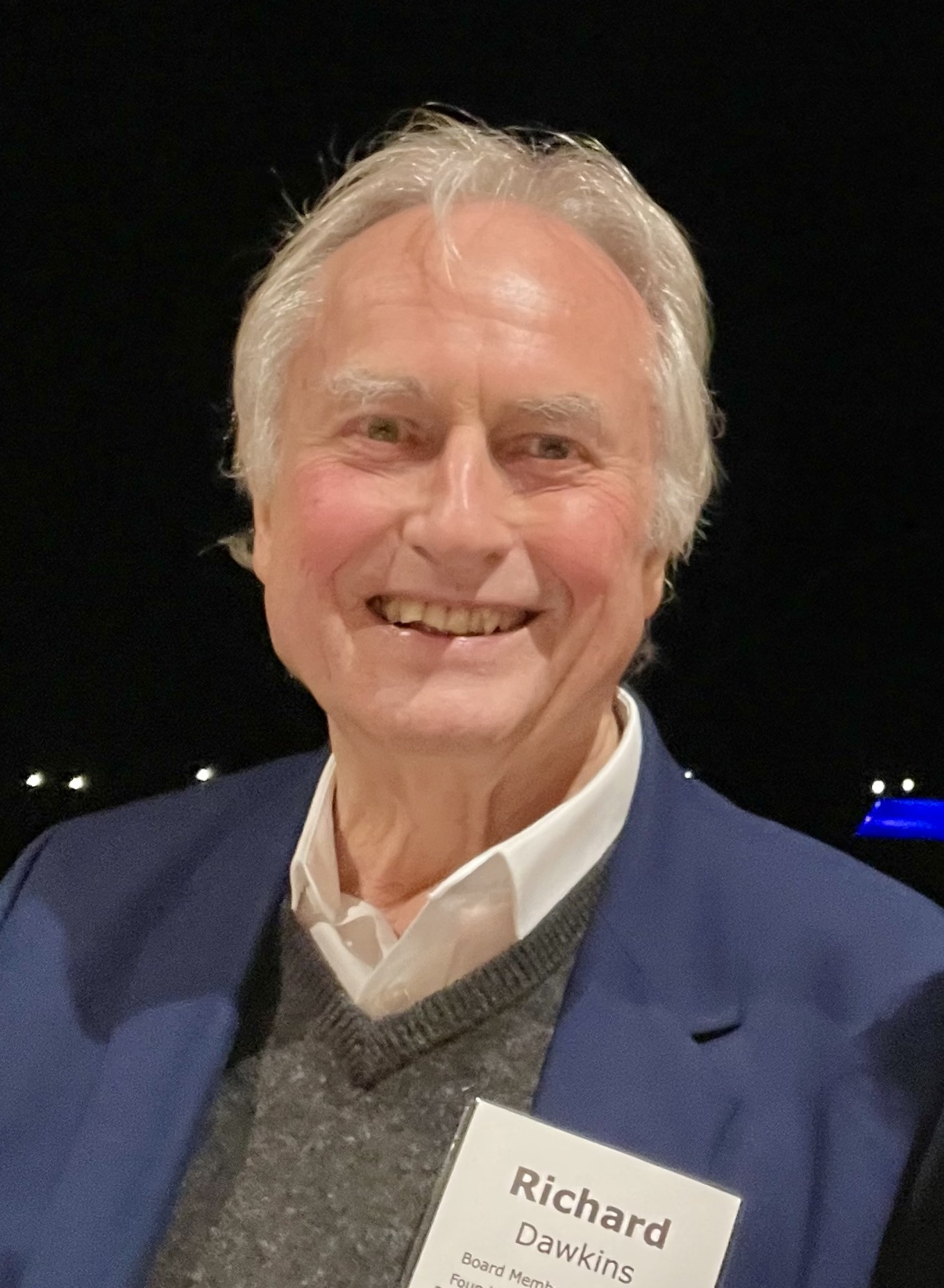
Richard Dawkins

- March 3 – Mike Pender, English musician
- March 4
  - Richard Benjamin Harrison, American businessman, reality TV star (d. 2018)
  - Adrian Lyne, English film director
- March 6 – Peter Brötzmann, German jazz saxophonist (d. 2023)
- March 7 – Andrei Mironov, Soviet and Russian theatre and film actor (d. 1987)
- March 9 – Ernesto Miranda, American criminal (d. 1976)
- March 10 – George P. Smith, American biochemist, Nobel Prize laureate
- March 11 – Shelly Zegart, American quilt historian (d. 2025)
- March 12 – Erkki Salmenhaara, Finnish composer (d. 2002)
- March 13 – Mahmoud Darwish, Palestinian poet and author (d. 2008)
- March 14 – Wolfgang Petersen, German film director (d. 2022)
- March 15
  - Mike Love, American musician (Beach Boys)
  - Song Zhenzhong, Chinese child internee and revolutionary martyr (d. 1949)
- March 16
  - Bernardo Bertolucci, Italian film director (d. 2018)
  - Robert Guéï, military ruler of Côte d'Ivoire (d. 2002)
  - Chuck Woolery, American game show host (d. 2024)
- March 17 – Paul Kantner, American rock guitarist (Jefferson Airplane) (d. 2016)
- March 18 – Wilson Pickett, African-American singer (d. 2006)
- March 20 – Kenji Kimihara, Japanese long-distance runner
- March 21 – Dirk Frimout, Belgian cosmonaut and astrophysicist
- March 22 – Bruno Ganz, Swiss actor (d. 2019)
- March 23 – Jim Trelease, American educator, author (d. 2022)
- March 25 – Richard M. Schulze, Founder of Best Buy
- March 26 – Richard Dawkins, British scientist
- March 27
  - Ivan Gašparovič, 3rd President of Slovakia
  - Bunny Sigler, American singer-songwriter and record producer (d. 2017)
- March 28
  - Alf Clausen, American composer (d. 2025)
  - Philip Fang, Hong Kong simultaneous interpretation specialist, United Nations official (d. 2013)
  - Jim Turner, American football player (d. 2023)
  - Rolf Zacher, German actor (d. 2018)
  - Jaime Pardo Leal, Colombian lawyer, union leader, and politician (d. 1987)
- March 29 – Joseph Hooton Taylor Jr., American astrophysicist, Nobel Prize laureate
- March 30
  - Graeme Edge, British rock drummer, songwriter (The Moody Blues) (d. 2021)
  - Wasim Sajjad, President of Pakistan
- March 31 – Rosario Green, Mexican economist, diplomat and politician (d. 2017)

=== April ===
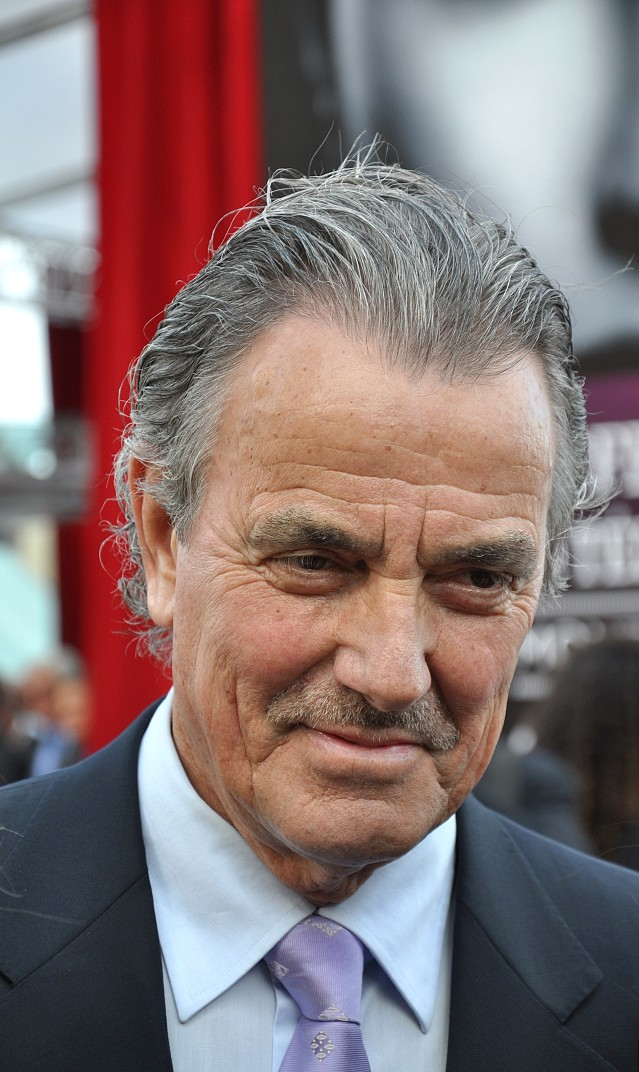
Eric Braeden

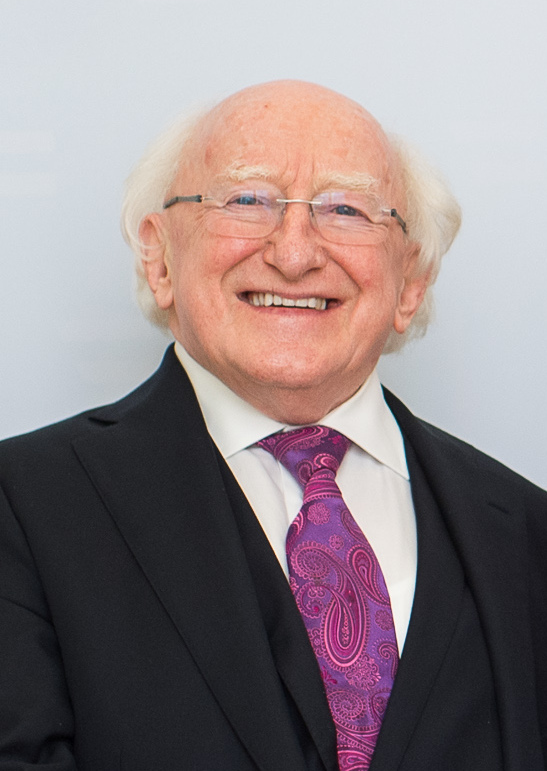
Michael D. Higgins

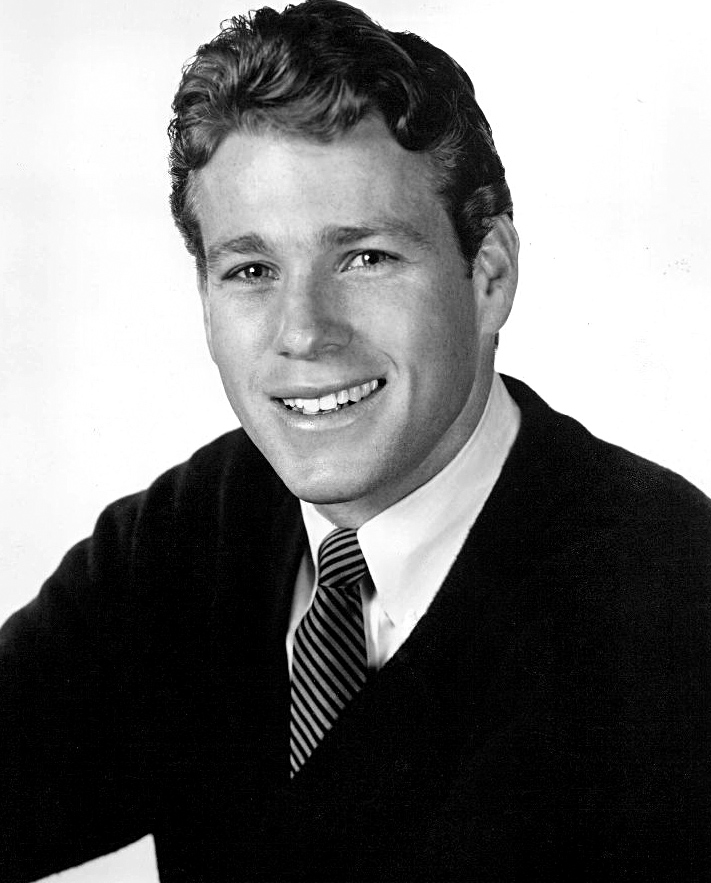
Ryan O'Neal

Ann-Margret

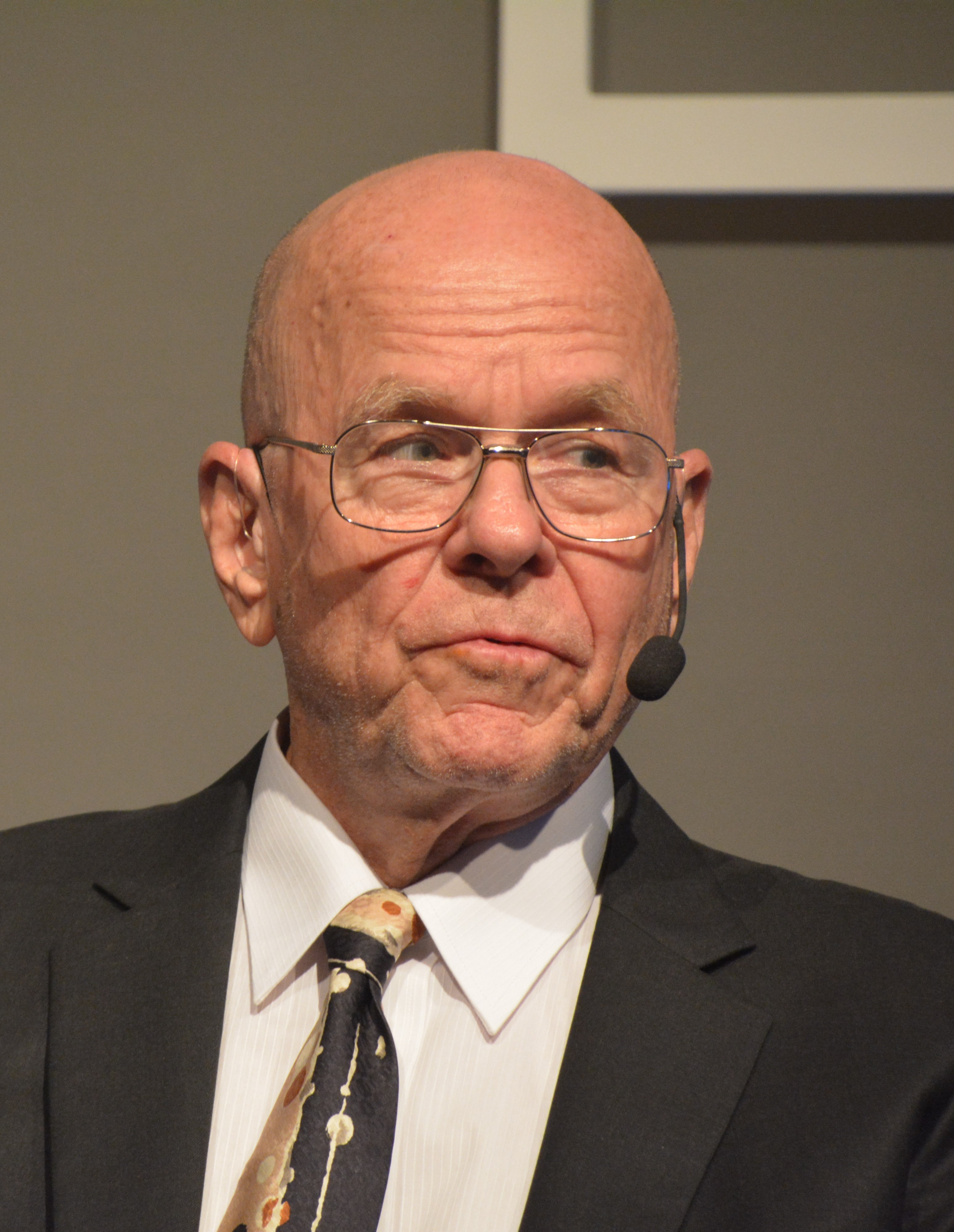
Karl Barry Sharpless

- April 2 – Dr. Demento (Barret Eugene Hansen), American radio disc jockey, novelty music collector
- April 3
  - Jan Berry, American singer (Jan & Dean) (d. 2004)
  - Eric Braeden, German-born American actor
  - Jorma Hynninen, Finnish baritone
  - Philippé Wynne, American musician (d. 1984)
- April 5
  - Michael Moriarty, American-Canadian actor
  - Dave Swarbrick, English folk musician (d. 2016)
- April 6 – Phil Austin, American comedian (The Firesign Theater) (d. 2015)
- April 7
  - Cornelia Frances, British-born Australian actress (d. 2018)
  - ʻAkilisi Pōhiva, Tongan politician and activist, 15th Prime Minister of Tonga (d. 2019)
- April 8 – Peggy Lennon, American singer (The Lennon Sisters)
- April 9 – Kay Adams, American country singer
- April 10
  - John Kurila, Scottish footballer (d. 2018)
  - Paul Theroux, American travel writer and novelist
- April 11
  - Frederick Hauck, American astronaut (d. 2025)
  - Shirley Stelfox, English actress (d. 2015)
- April 12 – Bobby Moore, English football player, World Cup winning captain (d. 1993)
- April 13 – Michael Stuart Brown, American geneticist, recipient of the Nobel Prize in Physiology or Medicine
- April 14 – Pete Rose, American baseball player (d. 2024)
- April 18 – Michael D. Higgins, 9th President of Ireland
- April 19
  - Roberto Carlos, Brazilian singer-songwriter
  - Jürgen Kocka, German historian
- April 20 – Ryan O'Neal, American actor (Love Story) (d. 2023)
- April 21 – Eduardo Guedes, U.S., Portuguese film-maker (d. 2000)
- April 22 – Amir Pnueli, Israeli computer scientist (d. 2009)
- April 23
  - Arie den Hartog, Dutch road bicycle racer (d. 2018)
  - Paavo Lipponen, 59th Prime Minister of Finland
  - Ed Stewart, British disc jockey (d. 2016)
  - Ray Tomlinson, American computer programmer (d. 2016)
- April 24
  - Richard Holbrooke, American diplomat (d. 2010)
  - John Williams, Australian guitarist
- April 25
  - Princess Muna al-Hussein, Princess consort of Jordan
  - Dorothy Shea, Australian librarian (d. 2024)
  - Bertrand Tavernier, French director, screenwriter, actor and producer (d. 2021)
- April 26 – Claudine Auger, French actress (d. 2019)
- April 28
  - Lucien Aimar, French cyclist
  - Ann-Margret, Swedish-born American actress, singer and dancer
  - Karl Barry Sharpless, American chemist, double Nobel Prize laureate
  - Iryna Zhylenko, Ukrainian poet (d. 2013)
- April 29 – Nana Caymmi, Brazilian singer (d. 2025)

=== May ===
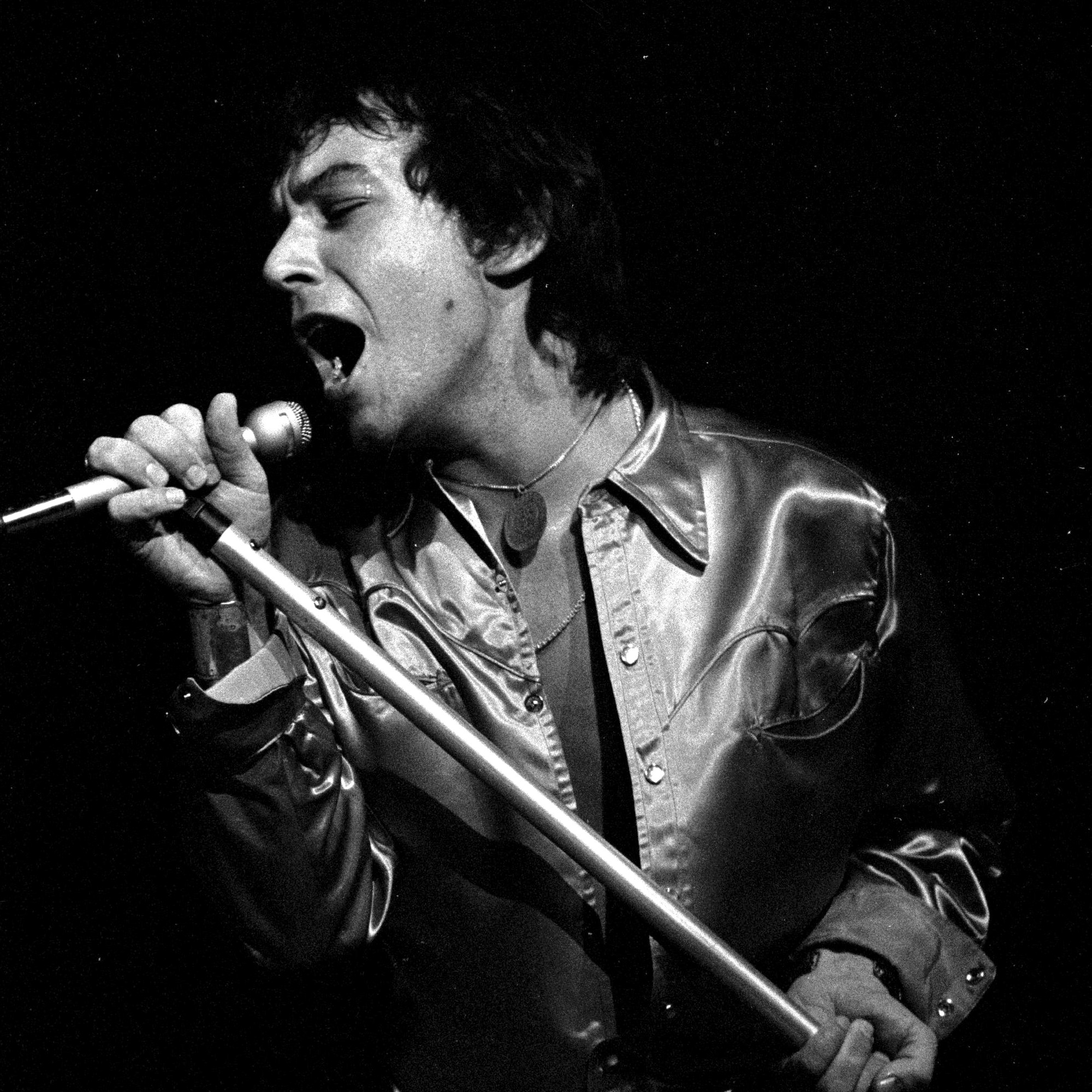
Eric Burdon

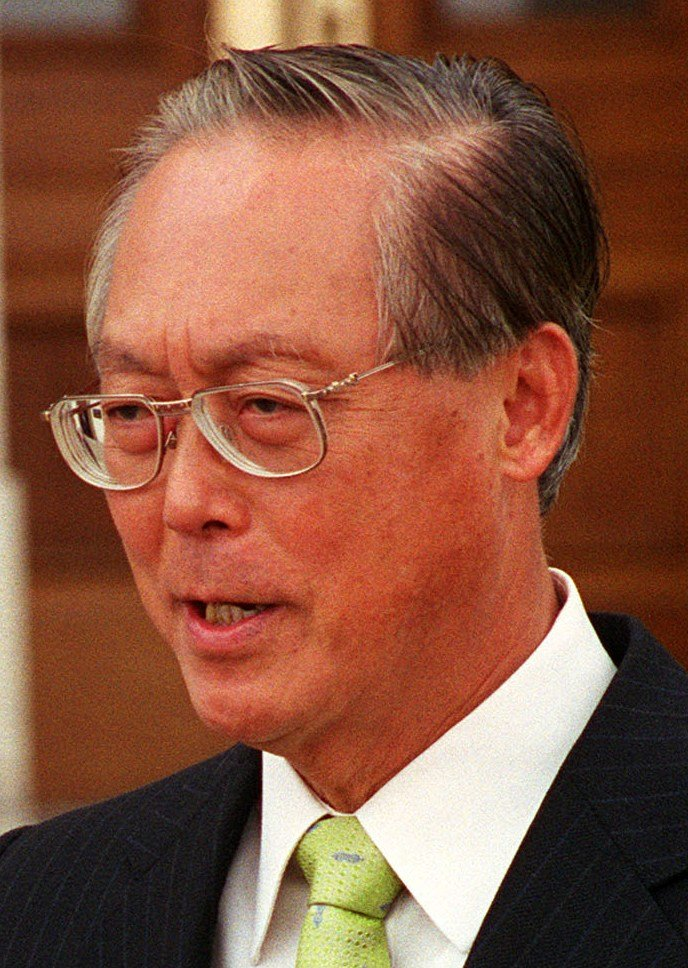
Goh Chok Tong

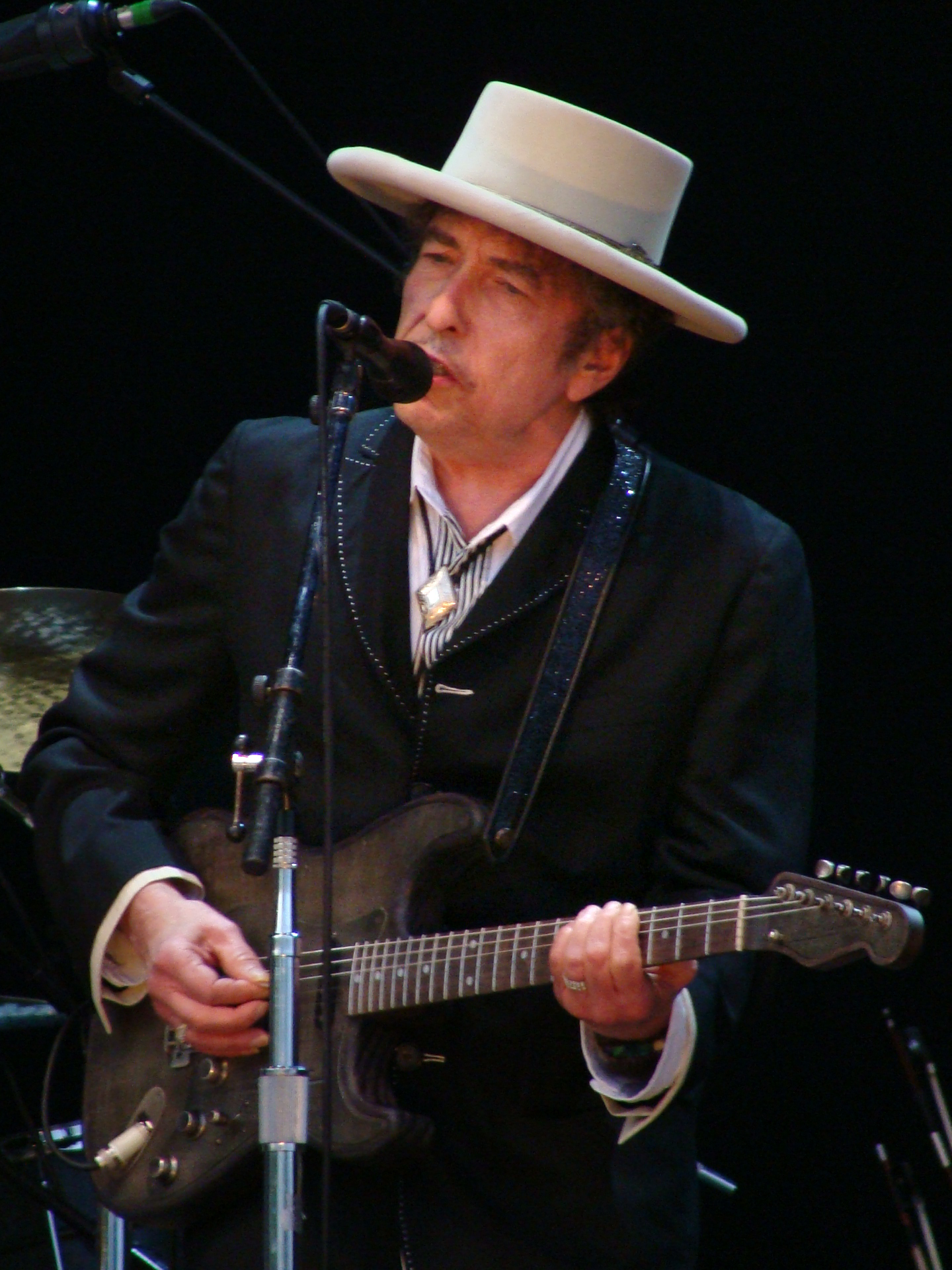
Bob Dylan

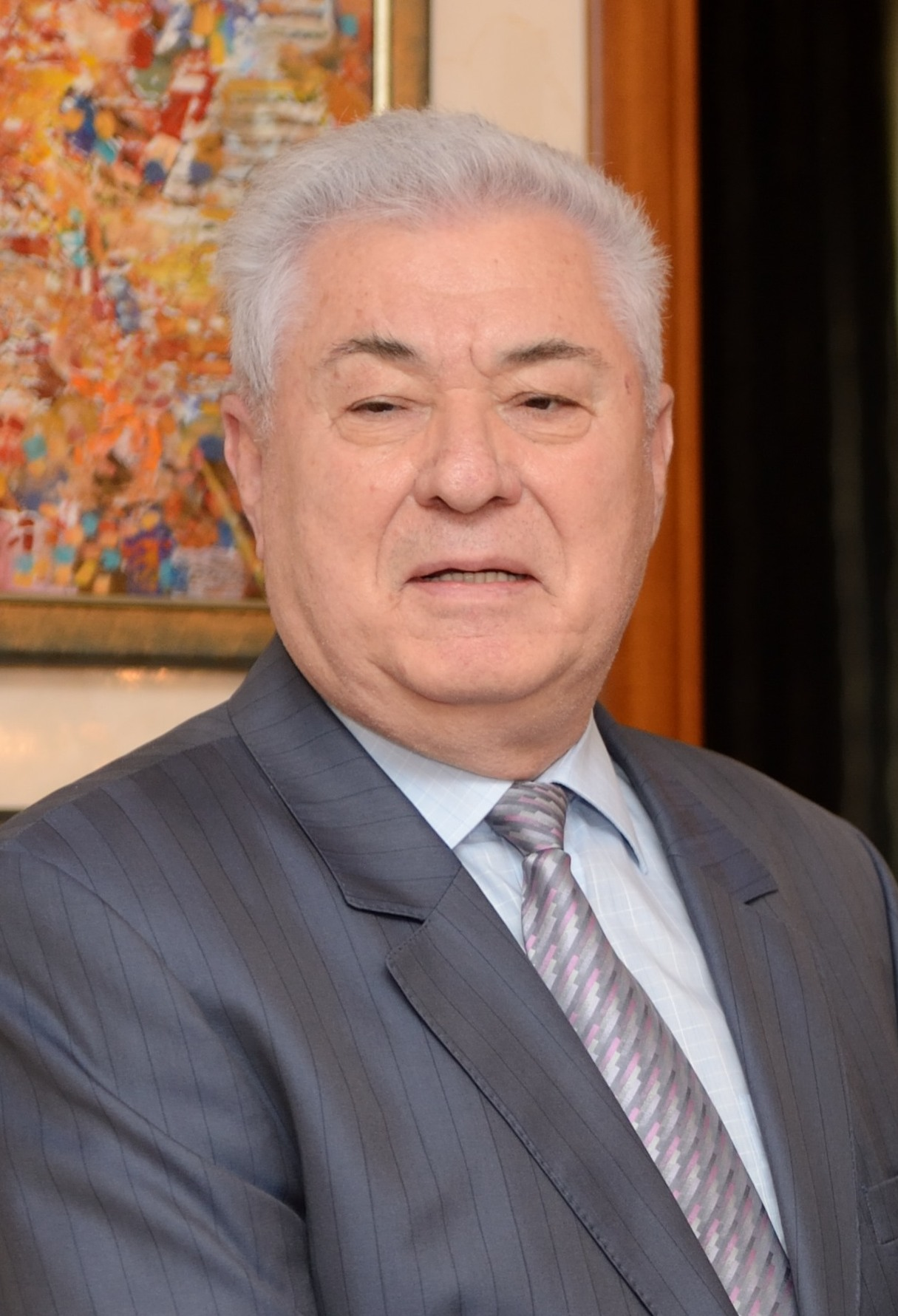
Vladimir Voronin

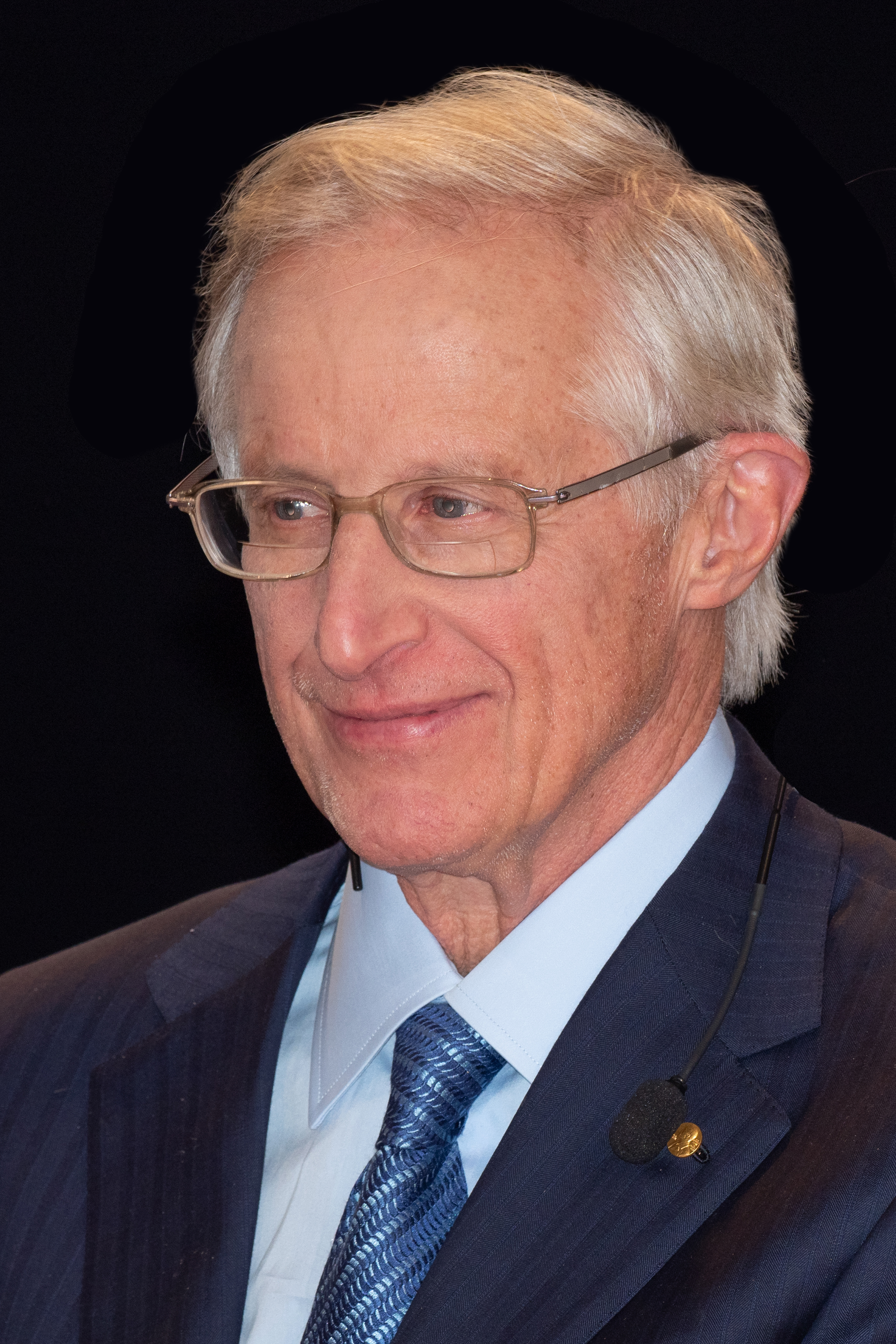
William Nordhaus

- May 3
  - Paul Ferris, English film composer, actor (d. 1995)
  - Kornel Morawiecki, Polish politician and theoretical physicist (d. 2019)
- May 5
  - Anatoly Levchenko, Soviet cosmonaut (d. 1988)
  - Alexander Ragulin, Russian hockey player (d. 2004)
- May 6
  - Peter Corrigan, Australian architect (d. 2016)
  - Ivica Osim, Bosnian football player, manager (d. 2022)
- May 8
  - James Mitchum, American actor
  - Yuri Voronov, Abkhazian politician, academic (murdered) (d. 1995)
- May 9 – Howard Komives, American professional basketball player (d. 2009)
- May 10
  - Taurean Blacque, American television and stage actor (d. 2022)
  - Chris Denning, English radio presenter and convicted sex offender (d. 2022)
  - Aydın Güven Gürkan, Turkish academic, politician (d. 2006)
- May 11 – Eric Burdon, British singer
- May 13
  - Senta Berger, Austrian actress
  - Ritchie Valens, American singer (La Bamba) (d. 1959)
- May 14 – Jesús Gómez, Mexican equestrian (d. 2017)
- May 16 – Eric Berntson, Canadian politician (d. 2018)
- May 18 – Miriam Margolyes, British-Australian actress
- May 19
  - Peter C. Bjarkman, American baseball historian, author (d. 2018)
  - Bobby Burgess, American dancer, singer
  - Nora Ephron, American film producer, director, and screenwriter (d. 2012)
  - Jose Kaimlett, Indian Catholic priest, founder of the Heralds of Good News (d. 2018)
- May 20 – Goh Chok Tong, 2nd Prime Minister of Singapore
- May 21 – Bobby Cox, American baseball manager (d. 2026)
- May 22 – Menzies Campbell, Scottish politician (d. 2025)
- May 23 – K. Raghavendra Rao, Indian film director, producer, screenwriter and choreographer
- May 24
  - Andrés García, Dominican-Mexican actor (d. 2023)
  - Bob Dylan, American poet, musician and recipient of the Nobel Prize in Literature
- May 25
  - Rudolf Adler, Czech filmmaker
  - Vladimir Voronin, 3rd President of Moldova
- May 26 – John Kaufman, British sculptor (d. 2002)
- May 27
  - Ira Berlin, American historian (d. 2018)
  - Teppo Hauta-aho, Finnish double bassist, composer (d. 2021)
- May 29 – Doug Scott, English mountaineer (d. 2020)
- May 31
  - Louis Ignarro, American pharmacologist, recipient of the Nobel Prize in Physiology or Medicine
  - William Nordhaus, American economist, recipient of the Nobel Memorial Prize in Economic Sciences (d. 2026)

=== June ===
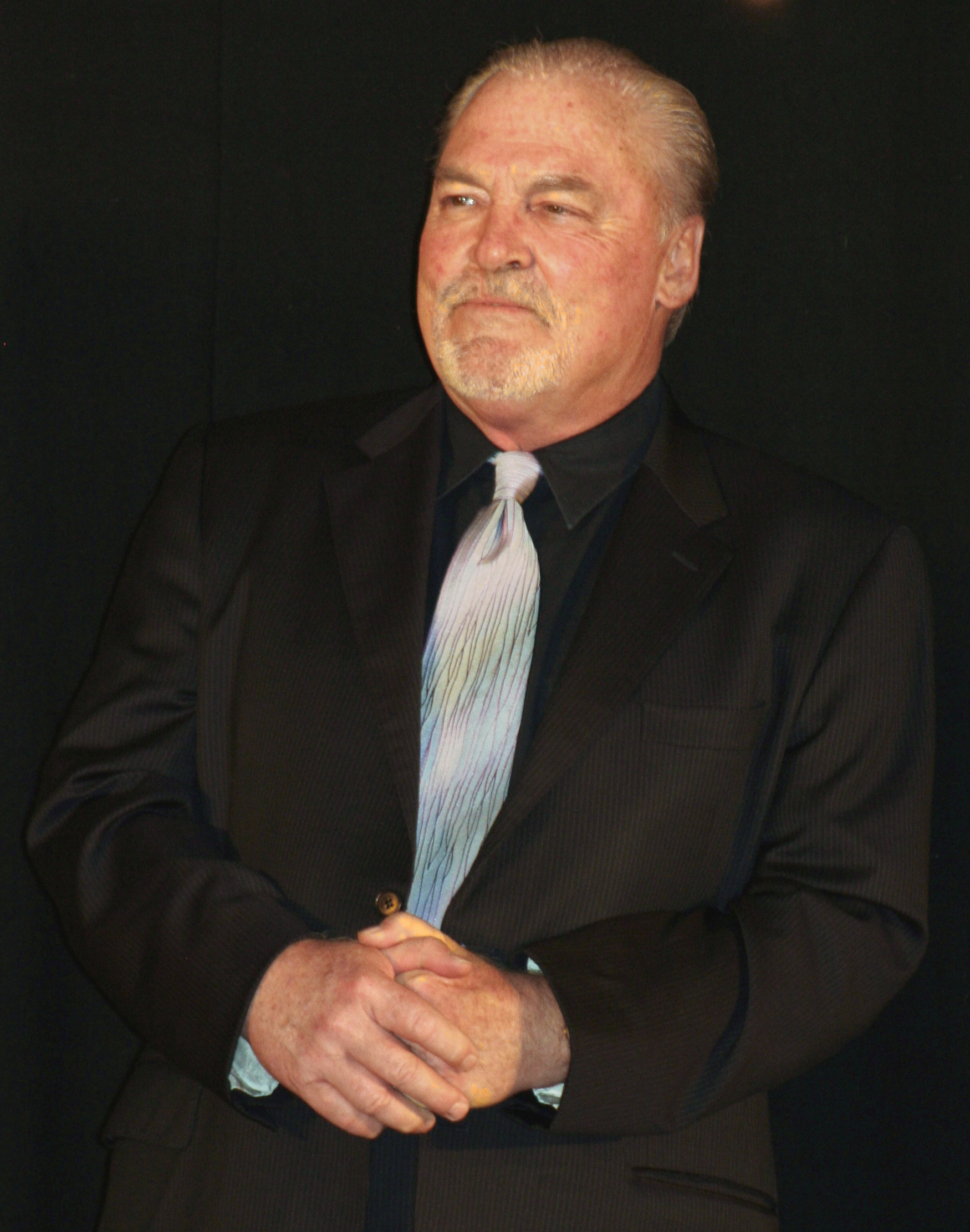
Stacy Keach

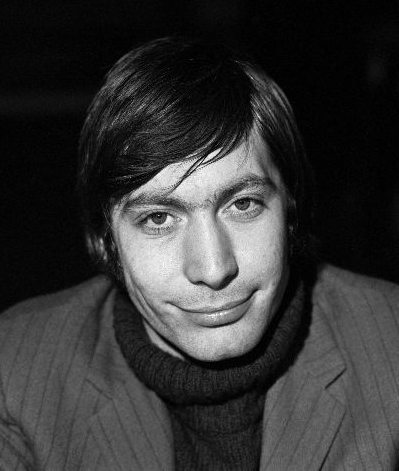
Charlie Watts

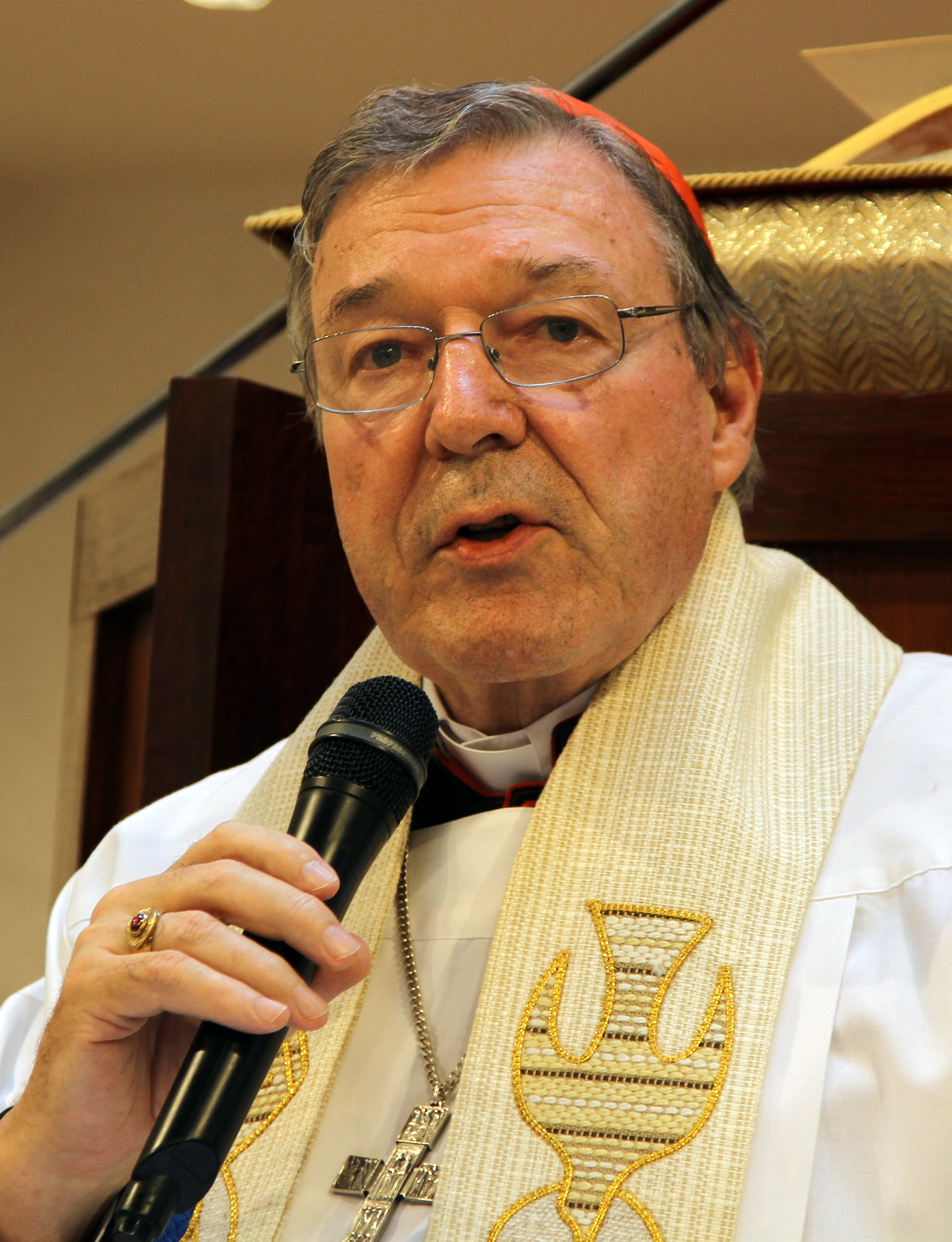
George Pell

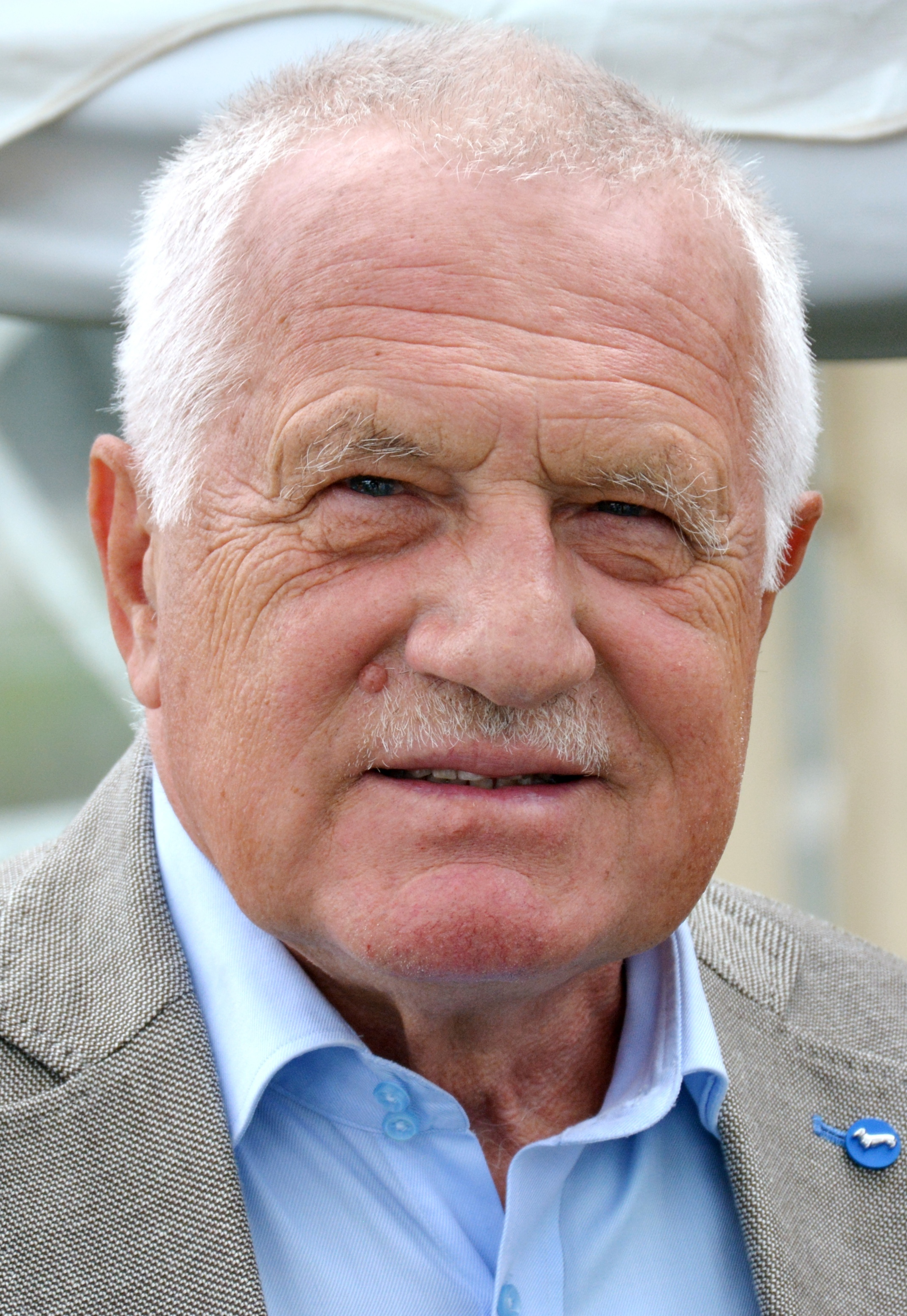
Václav Klaus

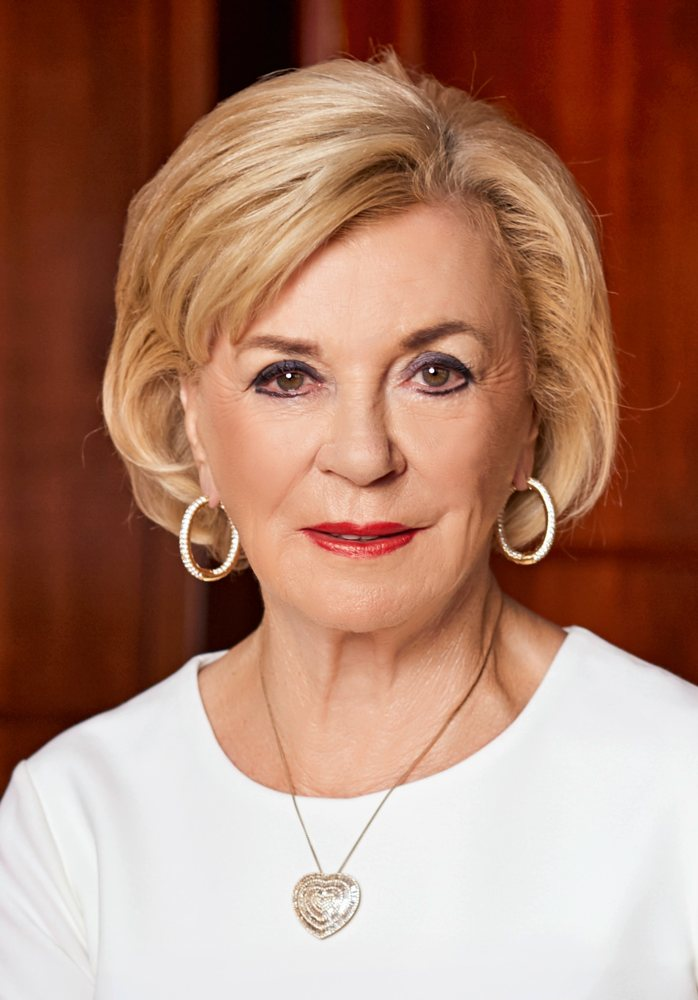
Liz Mohn

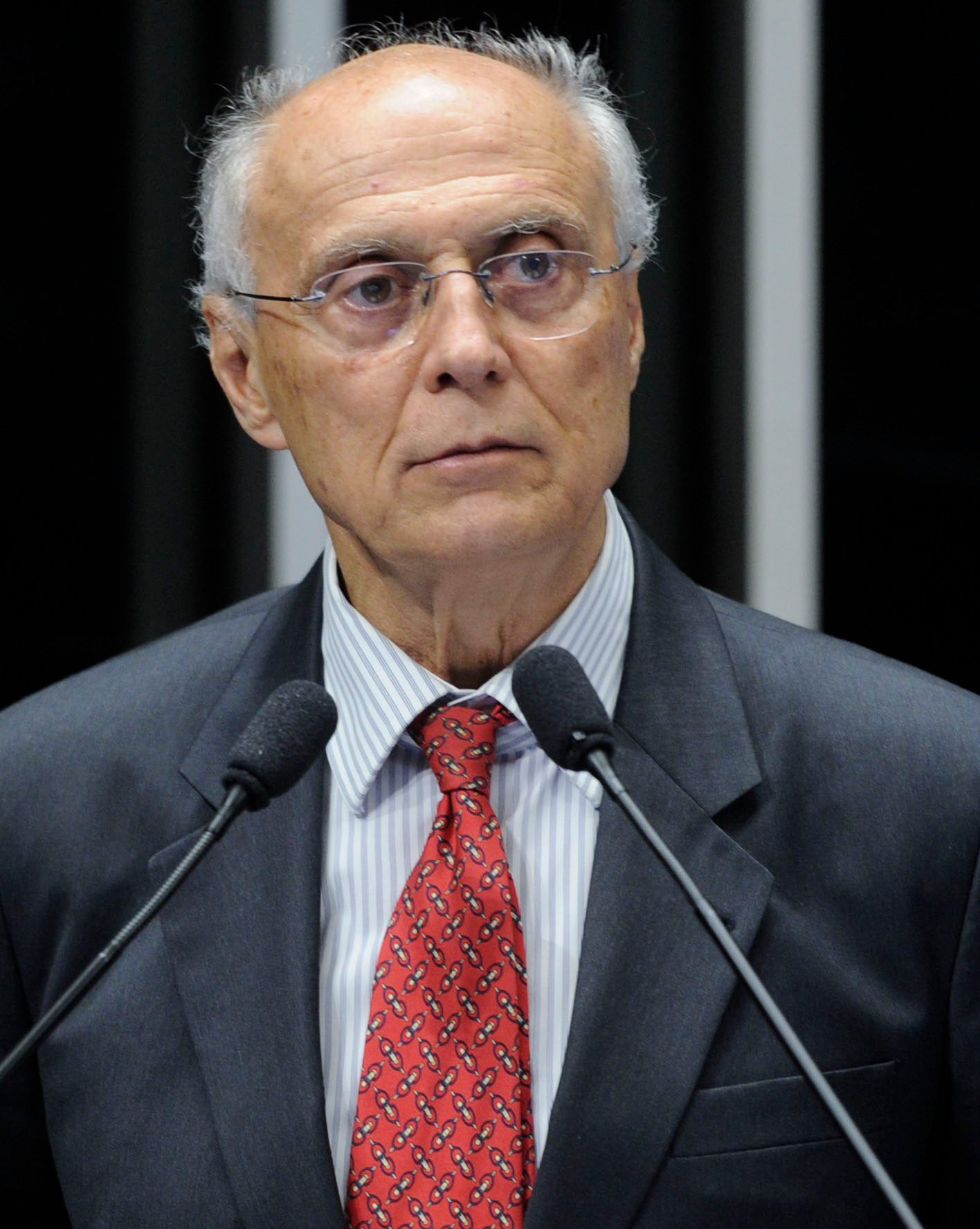
Eduardo Suplicy

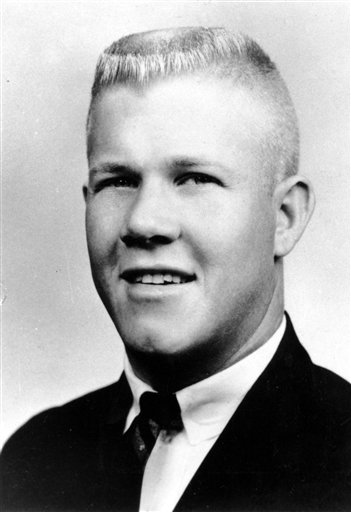
Charles Whitman

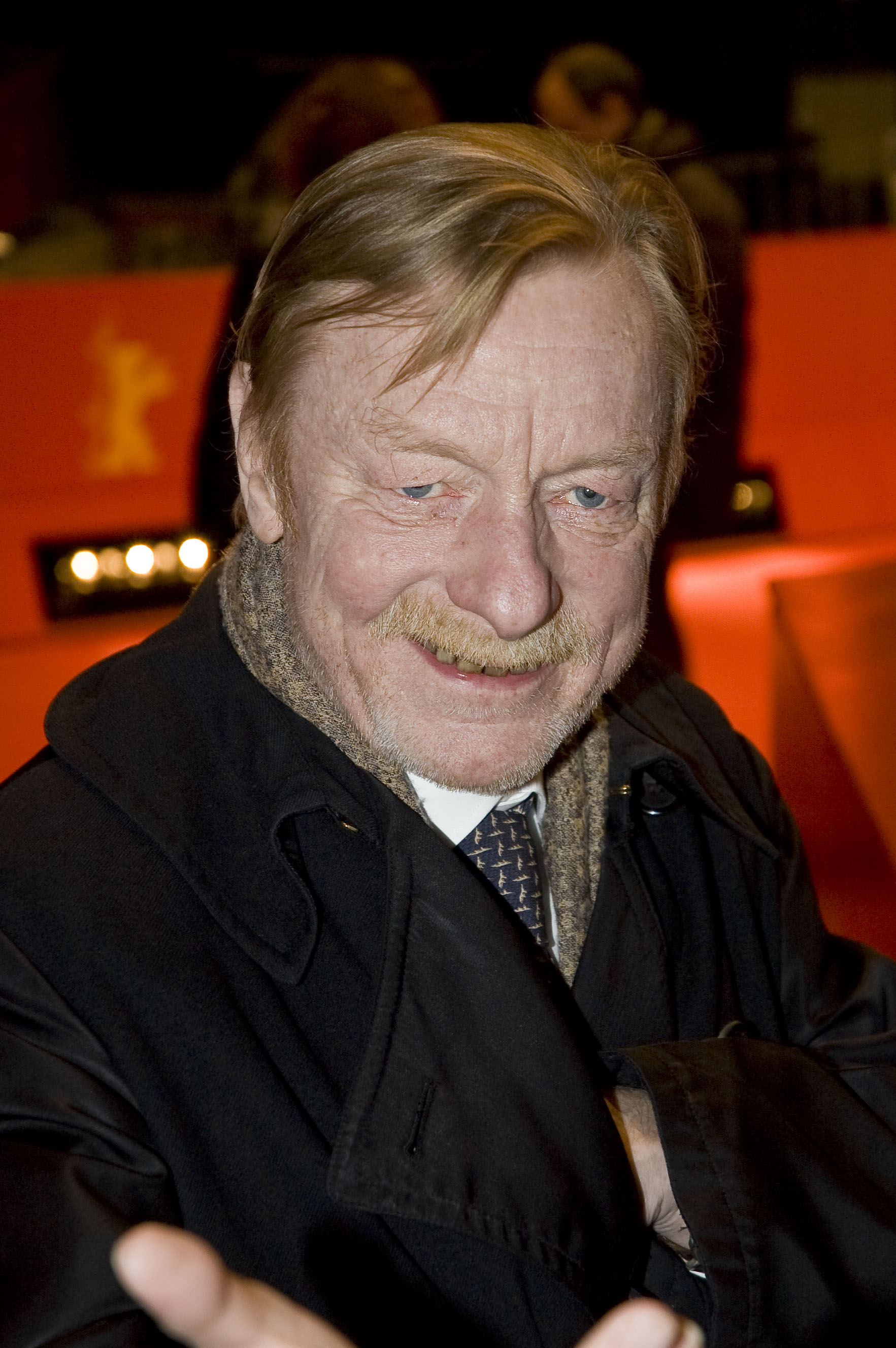
Otto Sander

- June 1
  - Wayne Kemp, American country music singer (d. 2015)
  - Jigjidiin Mönkhbat, Mongolian wrestler (d. 2018)
  - Alexander V. Zakharov, Soviet and Russian astronomer
- June 2
  - Stacy Keach, American actor (d. 2026)
  - Charlie Watts, English musician (d. 2021)
- June 5
  - Martha Argerich, Argentine pianist
  - Spalding Gray, American actor, screenwriter (d. 2004)
  - Robert Kraft, American businessman
- June 6 – Alexander Cockburn, Irish-American political journalist and writer (d. 2012)
- June 7
  - Tony Ray-Jones, British photographer (d. 1972)
  - Jaime Laredo, Bolivian-American violinist and conductor
- June 8
  - Robert Bradford, Northern Irish politician (murdered in 1981)
  - Fuzzy Haskins, American musician
  - George Pell, Australian cardinal (d. 2023)
- June 9 – Jon Lord, English composer, pianist and organist (d. 2012)
- June 10
  - Jürgen Prochnow, German actor
  - Aida Vedishcheva, Soviet and Russian singer
- June 12
  - Marv Albert, American sports announcer
  - Chick Corea, American jazz pianist (d. 2021)
  - Reg Presley, English musician (d. 2013)
  - Isa Stoppi, Italian model (d. 2020)
- June 13 – Esther Ofarim, Israeli singer
- June 14
  - Roy Harper, English guitarist
  - John Edgar Wideman, African-American novelist, author and professor
- June 15
  - Neal Adams, American comic book artist (d. 2022)
  - Harry Nilsson, American musician (d. 1994)
- June 17 – Roberta Maxwell, Canadian actress
- June 19
  - Gilberto Benetton, Italian billionaire businessman (d. 2018)
  - Conchita Carpio-Morales, Filipino Supreme Court jurist
  - Václav Klaus, 2nd President of the Czech Republic
- June 20
  - Ulf Merbold, German astronaut and physicist
  - Albert Shesternyov, Soviet footballer (d. 1994)
- June 21
  - Eduardo Suplicy, Brazilian left-wing politician, economist and professor
  - Valeri Zolotukhin, Soviet and Russian actor (d. 2013)
- June 22
  - Ed Bradley, African-American journalist (60 Minutes) (d. 2006)
  - Michael Lerner, American actor (d. 2023)
- June 23
  - Robert Hunter, American lyricist, singer-songwriter, translator and poet (d. 2019)
  - Madampu Kunjukuttan, Malayalam author (d. 2021)
  - Tsai Hsun-hsiung, Taiwanese politician
- June 24
  - Erkin Koray, Turkish musician (d. 2023)
  - Julia Kristeva, Bulgarian-French philosopher, literary critic, psychoanalyst, feminist and novelist
  - Nelson López, Argentine football defender (d. 1980)
  - Graham McKenzie, Australian cricketer
  - Bill Reardon, American politician, educator
  - Charles Whitman, American mass murderer (d. 1966)
- June 25
  - Denys Arcand, French-Canadian film director, screenwriter and producer
  - Miles Feinstein, American criminal law defense attorney, legal commentator
  - Eddie Large, British comedian (d. 2020)
  - Kenneth Walker, Australian cricketer
- June 26
  - Gil Garrido, Panamanian baseball player
  - Nick Macarchuk, American basketball head coach
  - Tamara Moskvina, Russian competitive skater and pair skating coach
  - Thomas Yeh Sheng-nan, Taiwanese prelate
- June 27
  - Jerry Allen, American football running back
  - Ian Black, British competitive swimmer
  - John Goold, Australian rules footballer (d. 2024)
  - James P. Hogan, British author (d. 2010)
  - Mike Honda, American politician and educator
  - Krzysztof Kieślowski, Polish film director (d. 1996)
  - Pavel Schenk, Czech volleyball player (d. 2025)
  - John Smyth, British barrister (d. 2018)
- June 28
  - Ilana Adir, Israeli Olympic runner and long jumper
  - César Bejarano, Paraguayan fencer
  - Len Boehmer, American Major League Baseball player
  - David Johnston, 28th Governor General of Canada
  - Barbara Stolz, German gymnast
- June 29
  - Chieko Baisho, Japanese actress, singer
  - Stokely Carmichael (later Kwame Ture), Trinidadian-American civil rights activist (d. 1998)
  - Margitta Gummel, German Olympic gold medalist
- June 30
  - Cyril Atanassoff, French-born Bulgarian ballet dancer
  - Roberto Castrillo, Cuban sports shooter
  - Otto Sander, German actor (d. 2013)

=== July ===
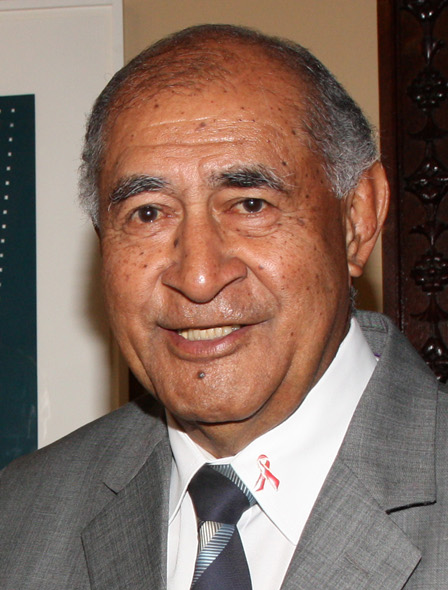
Epeli Nailatikau

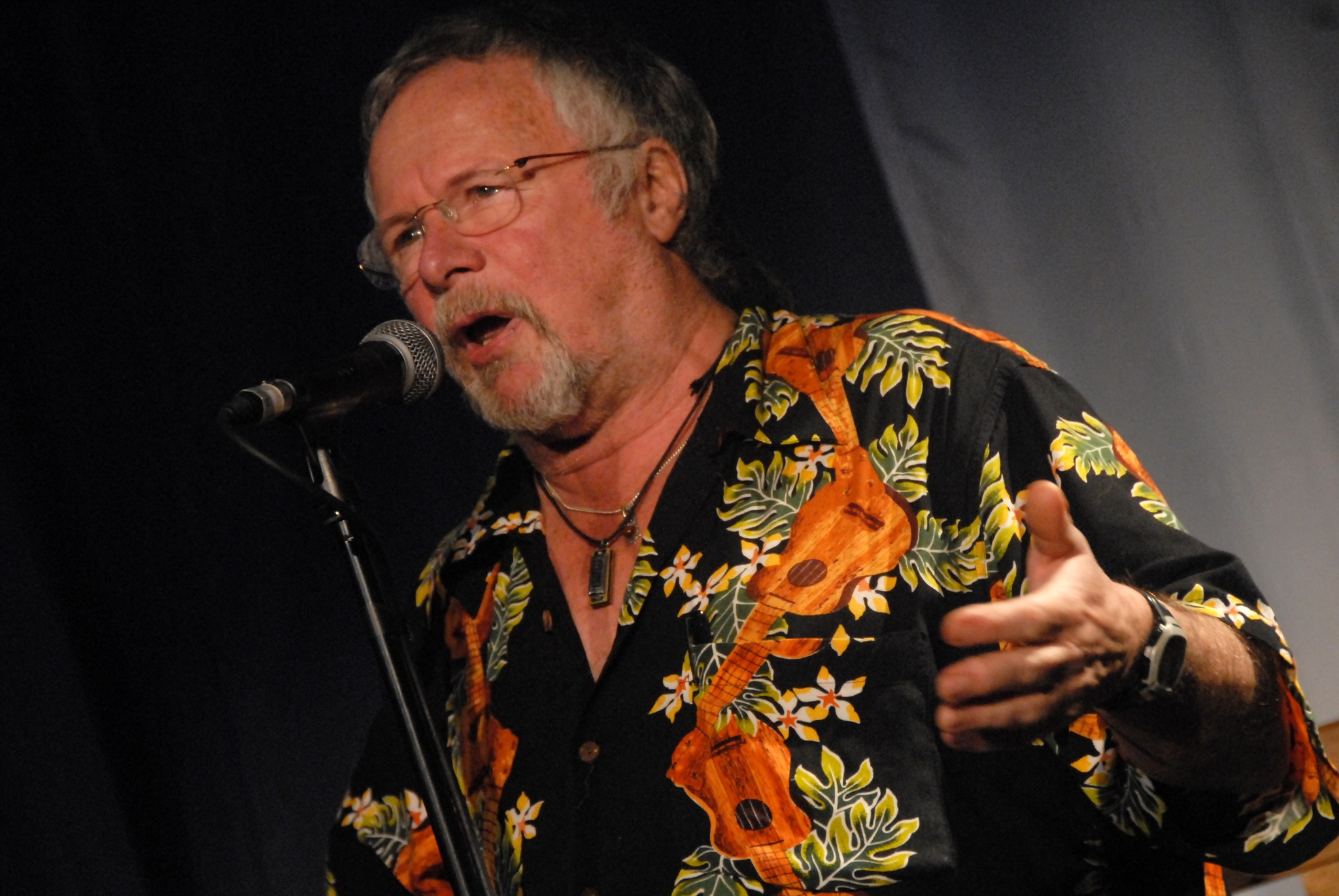
Bill Oddie

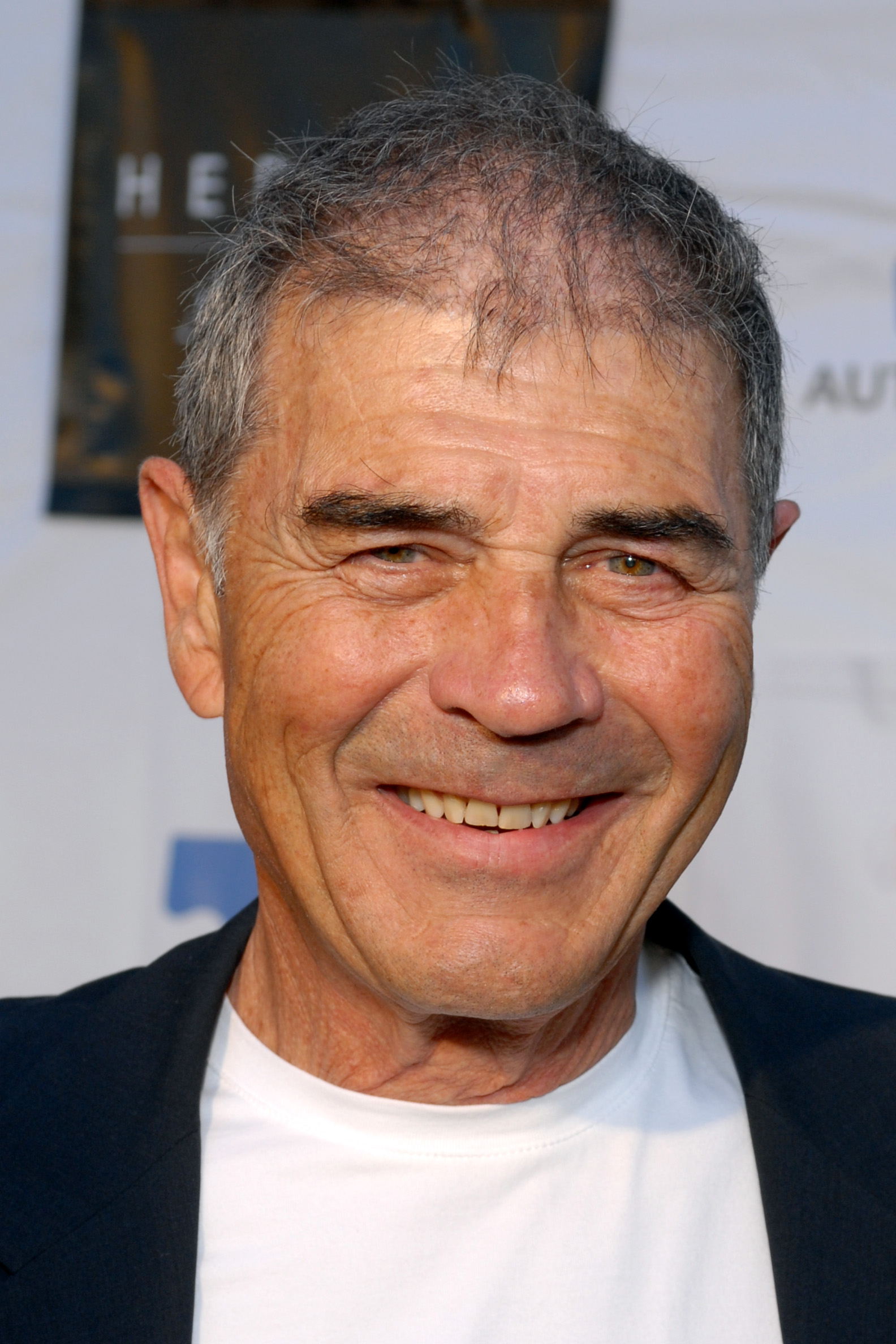
Robert Forster

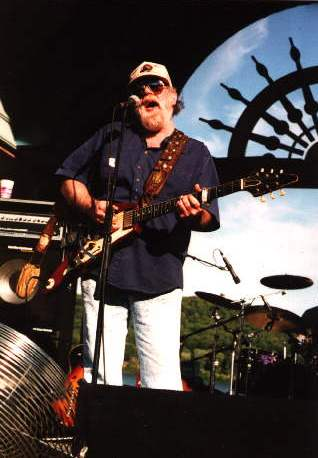
Lonnie Mack

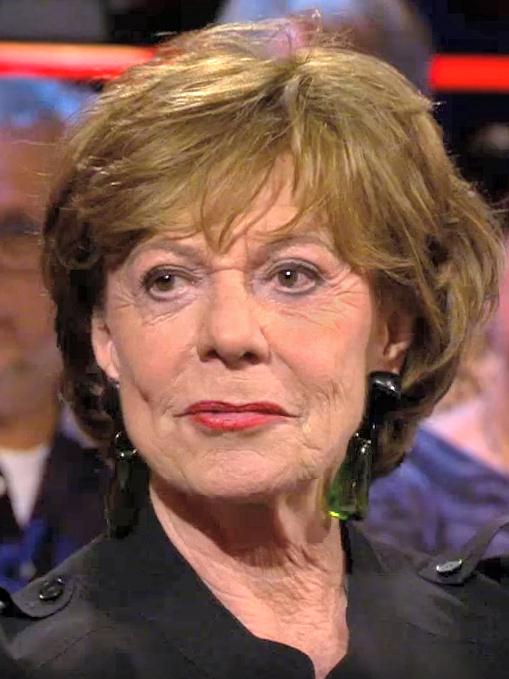
Neelie Kroes

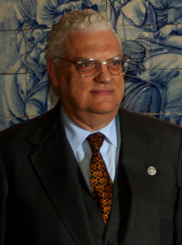
Diogo Freitas do Amaral

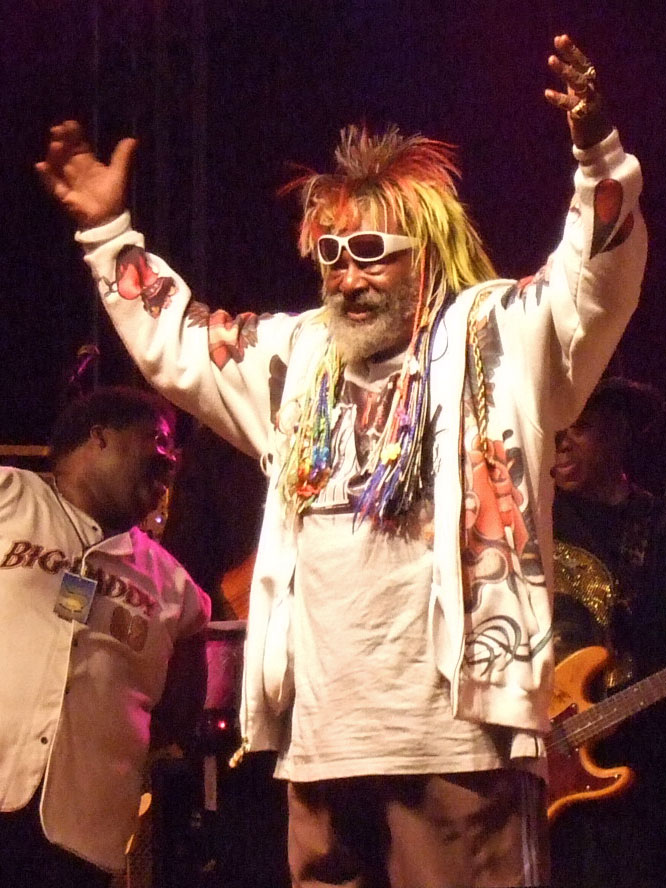
George Clinton

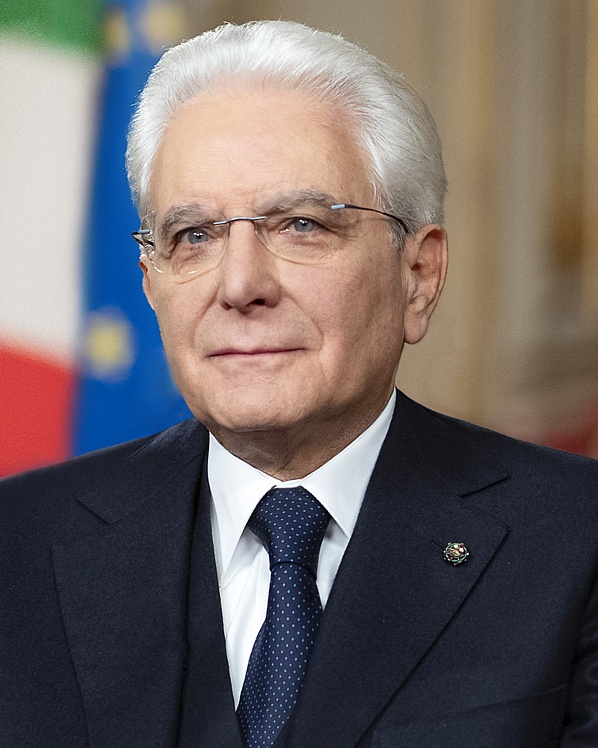
Sergio Mattarella

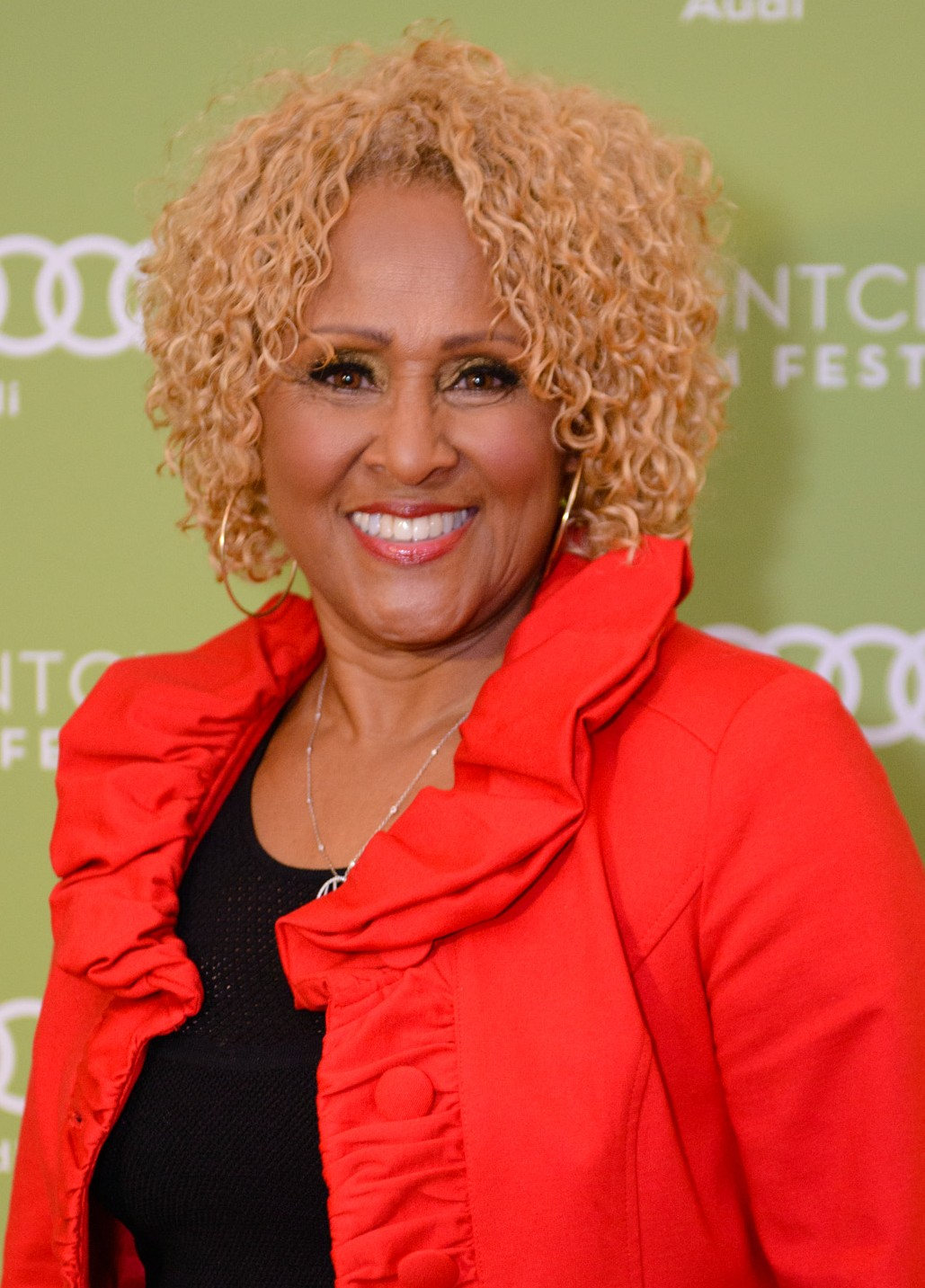
Darlene Love

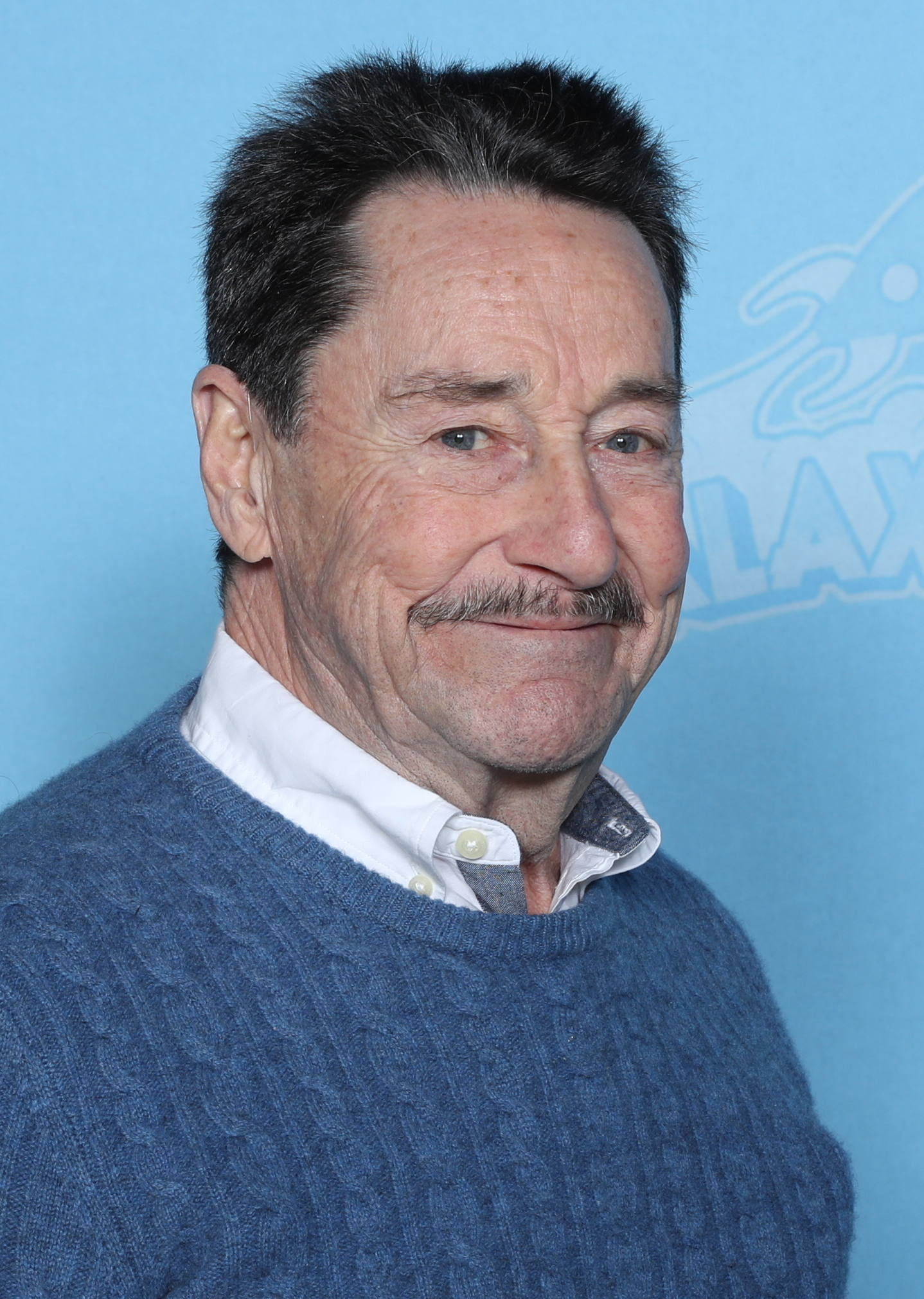
Peter Cullen

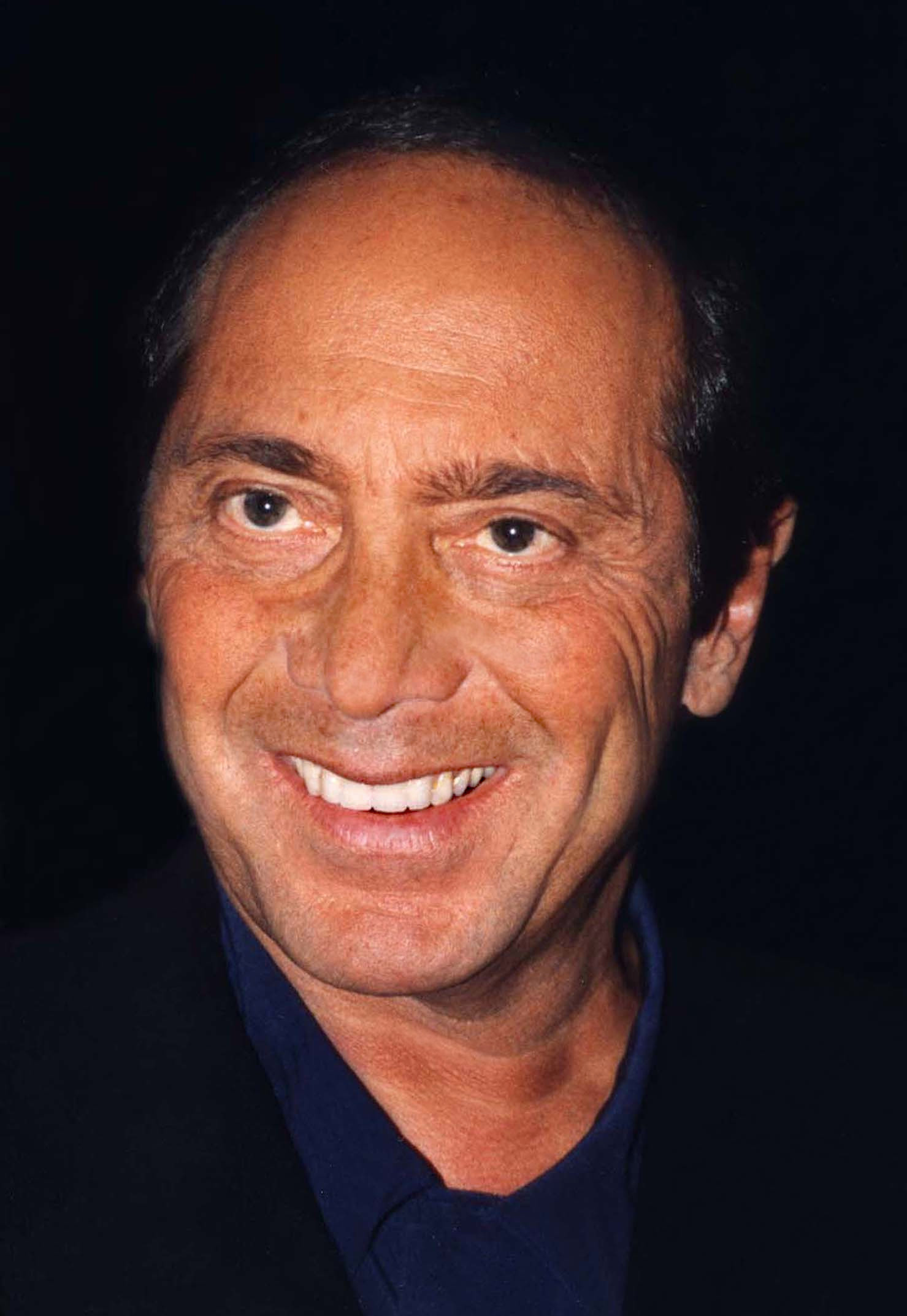
Paul Anka

- July 1
  - Alf Duval, Australian rower
  - Rod Gilbert, Canadian professional ice hockey forward (d. 2021)
  - Alfred G. Gilman, American scientist, recipient of the Nobel Prize in Physiology or Medicine (d. 2015)
  - Zimani Kadzamira, Malawian academic, civil servant and diplomat
  - Jaakko Kailajärvi, Finnish weightlifter
  - Ursula Koch, Swiss politician
  - Denis Michael Rohan, Australian citizen who, on August 21, 1969, set fire to the pulpit of the Al-Aqsa Mosque, in Jerusalem (d. 1995)
  - Nicolae Saramandu, Romanian linguist and philologist
  - Myron Scholes, Canadian-American financial economist
  - Twyla Tharp, American dancer, choreographer and author
- July 2
  - Mogens Frey, Danish amateur cyclist
  - Chris Noel, American actress
  - Stéphane Venne, French-Canadian songwriter, composer (d. 2025)
- July 3
  - Gloria Allred, American lawyer
  - Adoor Gopalakrishnan, Indian film director, screenwriter and producer
  - Hertha Haase, German swimmer
  - Liamine Zéroual, 4th President of Algeria (d. 2026)
- July 4
  - Jay Carty, American basketball player (d. 2017)
  - Sergio Oliva, Cuban bodybuilder (d. 2012)
  - Digger Phelps, American former college basketball coach
- July 5
  - Lynley Dodd, New Zealand writer and illustrator
  - Antonio Escohotado, Spanish philosopher and writer (d. 2021)
  - Barbara Frischmuth, Austrian writer and translator (d. 2025)
  - Peggy Miley, American actress, writer
  - Epeli Nailatikau, Fijian chief, 4th President of Fiji (d. 2026)
- July 6
  - John DeCamp, American politician (d. 2017)
  - Randall Robinson, African-American lawyer, author and activist (d. 2023)
  - Harold Leighton Weller, American conductor
- July 7
  - Vivian Barbot, Canadian-Haitian teacher, activist and politician
  - Marco Bollesan, Italian former rugby union player, coach and manager (d. 2021)
  - Alan Durban, Welsh international footballer, manager
  - Louis Friedman, American astronautics engineer, space spokesperson
  - Michael Howard, Welsh politician
  - Bill Oddie, English writer, composer, musician and comedian (d. 2026)
  - John Fru Ndi, Cameroonian politician (d. 2023)
  - Jim Rodford, English musician (d. 2018)
- July 8
  - Dario Gradi, Italia amateur football player, coach and manager (d. 2021)
  - Thunderbolt Patterson, American professional wrestler
  - Ken Sanders, American Major League Baseball relief pitcher (d. 2026)
- July 9
  - Cirilo Bautista, Filipino poet, fictionist, critic and writer of nonfiction (d. 2018)
  - Tom Black, American professional basketball player (d. 2017)
  - Jan Lehane, Australian female tennis player
  - Hans-Gunnar Liljenwall, Swedish modern pentathlete
  - Takehide Nakatani Japanese lightweight judoka
- July 10
  - Jackie Lane, British actress (d. 2021)
  - Robert Pine, American actor
- July 11
  - John Kaputin, Papua New Guinean politician
  - Rosa Morena, Spanish flamenco-pop singer and actress (d. 2019)
  - Clive Puzey, Southern Rhodesian racing driver
  - Jürgen Schmidt, German speed skater
  - Tommy Vance, British disc jockey (d. 2005)
- July 12
  - John Lahr, American drama critic
  - Benny Parsons, American race car driver (d. 2007)
  - Dick Rusteck, American left-handed pitcher
  - Juha Väätäinen, Finnish athlete
- July 13
  - Affonso Beato, Brazilian cinematographer
  - Robert Forster, American actor (d. 2019)
  - Zoila Martínez, Dominican lawyer, prosecutor and diplomat
  - Jacques Perrin, French actor and filmmaker (d. 2022)
- July 14
  - Danuta Chudzianka, Polish stage actress (d. 2011)
  - Maulana Karenga, African-American author, activist; founder of Kwanzaa
  - Dennis Kassian, Canadian professional ice hockey player
  - Andreas Khol, Austrian politician
- July 15
  - Archie Clark, American professional basketball player
  - Vicente Guillot, Spanish footballer
  - Nikhil Kumar, Indian politician
- July 16
  - Valeri Butenko, Soviet midfielder, football referee
  - Desmond Dekker, Jamaican singer and songwriter (d. 2006)
  - Ken Herock, American college, professional football player
  - Seijirō Kōyama, Japanese film director
  - Kálmán Mészöly, Hungarian football (soccer) player, coach
  - Lloyd Sisco, American football coach
  - Hans Wiegel, Dutch politician (d. 2025)
- July 17
  - Namirembe Bitamazire, Ugandan academic, politician
  - Marina Oswald Porter, Russian-born widow of JFK assassin Lee Harvey Oswald
  - Morimichi Takagi, Japanese baseball player (d. 2020)
  - Rob van Empel, Dutch breaststroke swimmer
- July 18
  - Winston Choo, Singaporean diplomat, civil servant and former general
  - Frank Farian, German record producer, songwriter (d. 2024)
  - Marcia Jones-Smoke, American sprint canoer
  - Lonnie Mack, American singer, guitarist (d. 2016)
  - Martha Reeves, African-American singer
  - Duncan Worsley, British cricketer
- July 19
  - Carlos Alberto Álvarez, Argentine cyclist
  - Natalia Bessmertnova, Russian ballerina (d. 2008)
  - Vikki Carr, American singer
  - Neelie Kroes, Dutch politician
  - Vittorio Di Prima, Italian actor and voice actor (d. 2016)
- July 20
  - Vladimir Lyakhov, Ukrainian-Soviet cosmonaut (d. 2018)
  - Frank Natterer, German mathematician
  - Vladimir Veber, Moldovan footballer
- July 21
  - Diogo Freitas do Amaral, Portuguese politician, 110th Prime Minister of Portugal (d. 2019)
  - Ron Corry, Australian football (soccer) player, coach
  - Gary Waslewski, American baseball player
- July 22
  - George Clinton, African-American funk musician
  - Wu Bangguo, Chinese politician (d. 2024)
- July 23
  - Pierre Agostini, French physicist, Nobel Prize laureate
  - Sergio Mattarella, Italian lawyer, judge and politician, 12th President of Italy
- July 25
  - Margarita Isabel, Mexican actress (d. 2017)
  - Nate Thurmond, African-American basketball player (d. 2016)
  - Emmett Till, African-American civil rights icon (d. 1955)
- July 26 – Darlene Love, African-American singer, actress
- July 28
  - Peter Cullen, Canadian voice actor (d. 2026)
  - Riccardo Muti, Italian conductor
- July 30 – Paul Anka, Canadian-American singer-songwriter

=== August ===
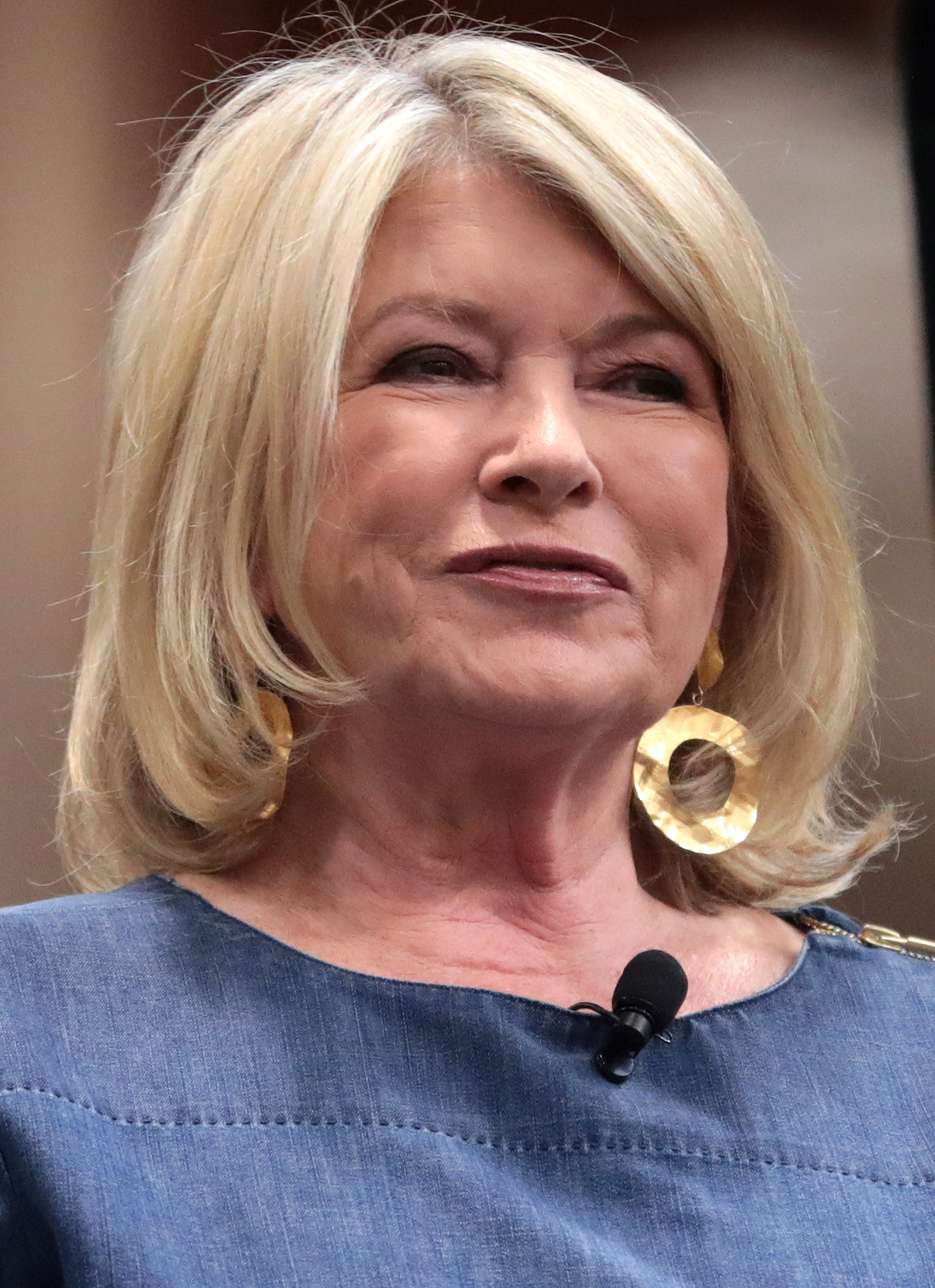
Martha Stewart

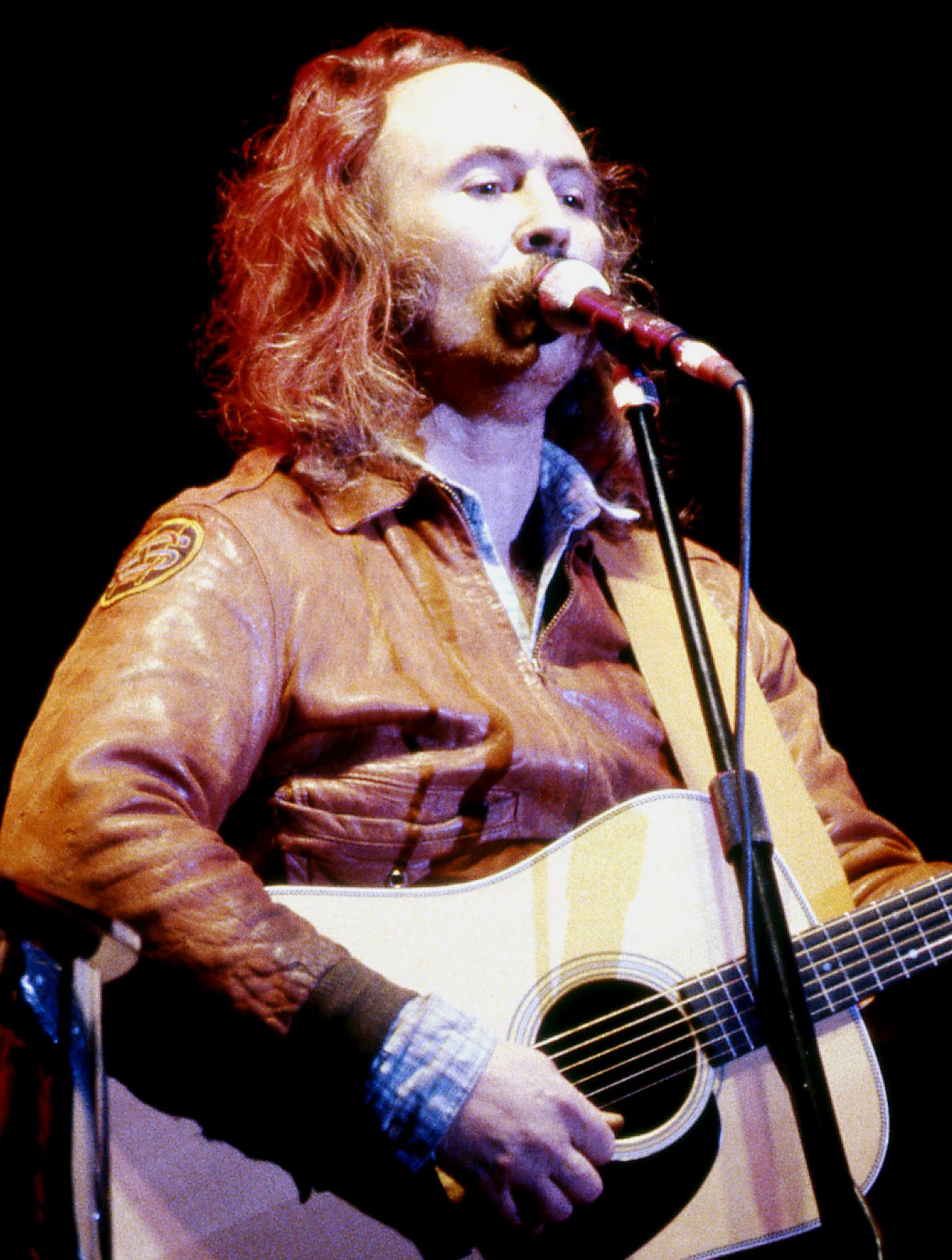
David Crosby

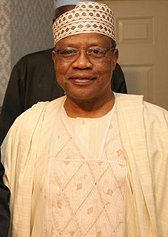
Ibrahim Babangida

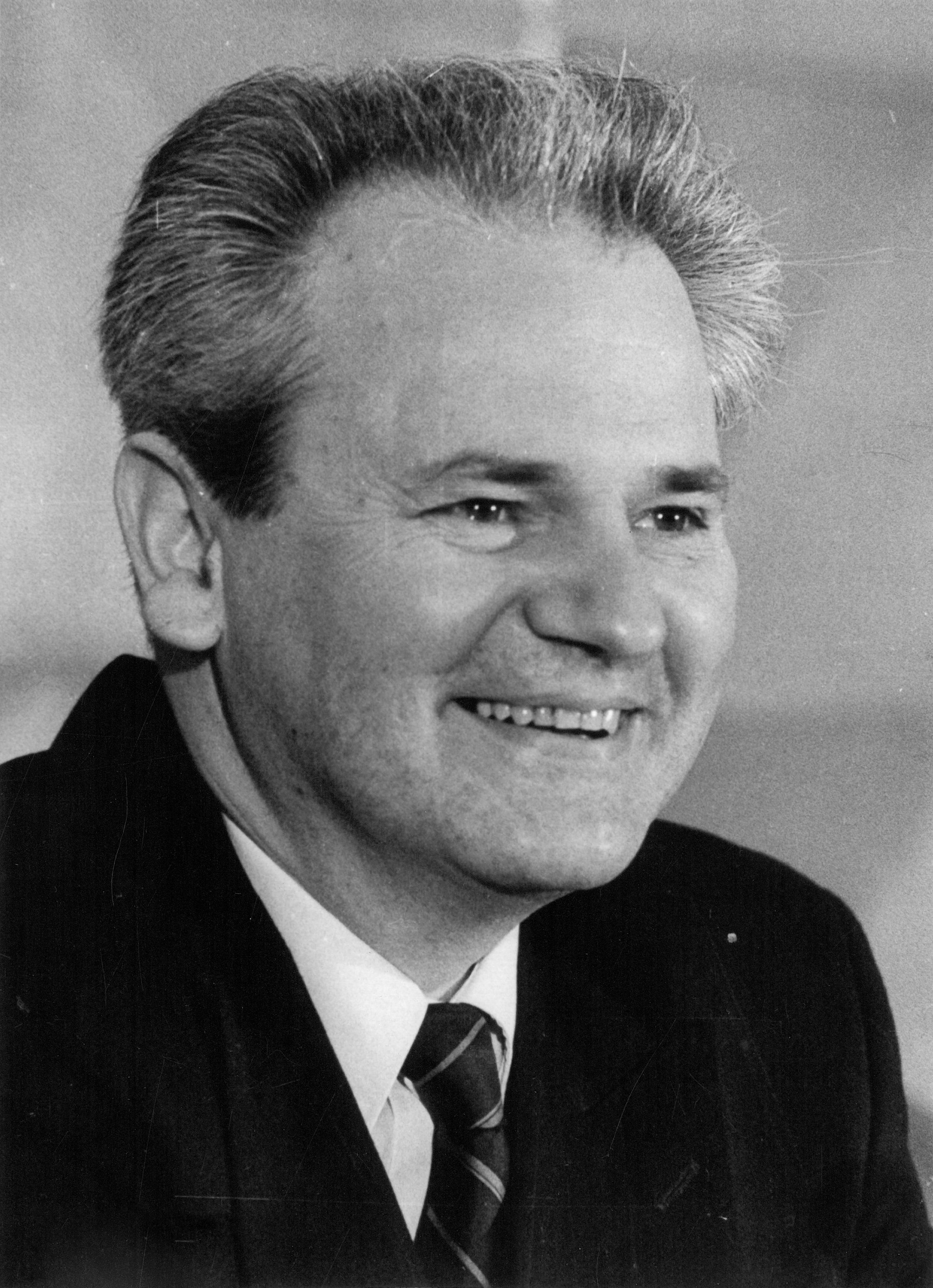
Slobodan Milošević

- August 2 – Ede Staal, Dutch singer-songwriter (d. 1986)
- August 3
  - Martha Stewart, American television personality, media entrepreneur
  - Hage Geingob, 1st Prime Minister of Namibia, 3rd President of Namibia (d. 2024)
- August 4
  - Martin Jarvis, English actor and voice actor
  - Ted Strickland, American politician
- August 5 – Gil Garcetti, American politician
- August 6 – Lyle Berman, American poker player
- August 8
  - Earl Boen, American actor and voice actor (d. 2023)
  - George Tiller, American physician (d. 2009)
  - Anri Jergenia, 4th Prime Minister of Abkhazia (d. 2020)
- August 9 – Shirlee Busbee, American novelist
- August 12 – Deborah Walley, American actress (d. 2001)
- August 14
  - Aïcha Chenna, Moroccan women's rights activist (d. 2022)
  - David Crosby, American musician (Crosby, Stills and Nash) (d. 2023)
  - Connie Smith, American singer
- August 15 – Nangolo Mbumba, 4th President of Namibia
- August 16
  - Théoneste Bagosora, Rwandan army officer, alleged planner of the Rwandan genocide (d. 2021)
  - David Dickinson, British antiques expert, television presenter
  - Mark Mulvoy, American sports journalist and writer
- August 17
  - Ibrahim Babangida, President of Nigeria
  - Lothar Bisky, German politician (d. 2013)
  - Fritz Wepper, German actor (d. 2024)
- August 20 – Slobodan Milošević, 3rd President of Yugoslavia and 1st President of Serbia (d. 2006)
- August 21
  - Jackie DeShannon, American singer-songwriter ("What the World Needs Now")
  - Howard Lew Lewis, English comedian, actor (d. 2018)
- August 26 – Ayşe Kulin, Turkish fiction writer
- August 27
  - Cesária Évora, Cape Verdean singer (d. 2011)
  - Yury Malyshev, Soviet cosmonaut (d. 1999)
- August 28 – A. I. Katsina-Alu, Nigerian judge (d. 2018)
- August 29 – Robin Leach, English television personality (d. 2018)

=== September ===
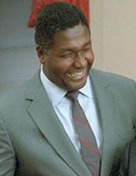
John Thompson

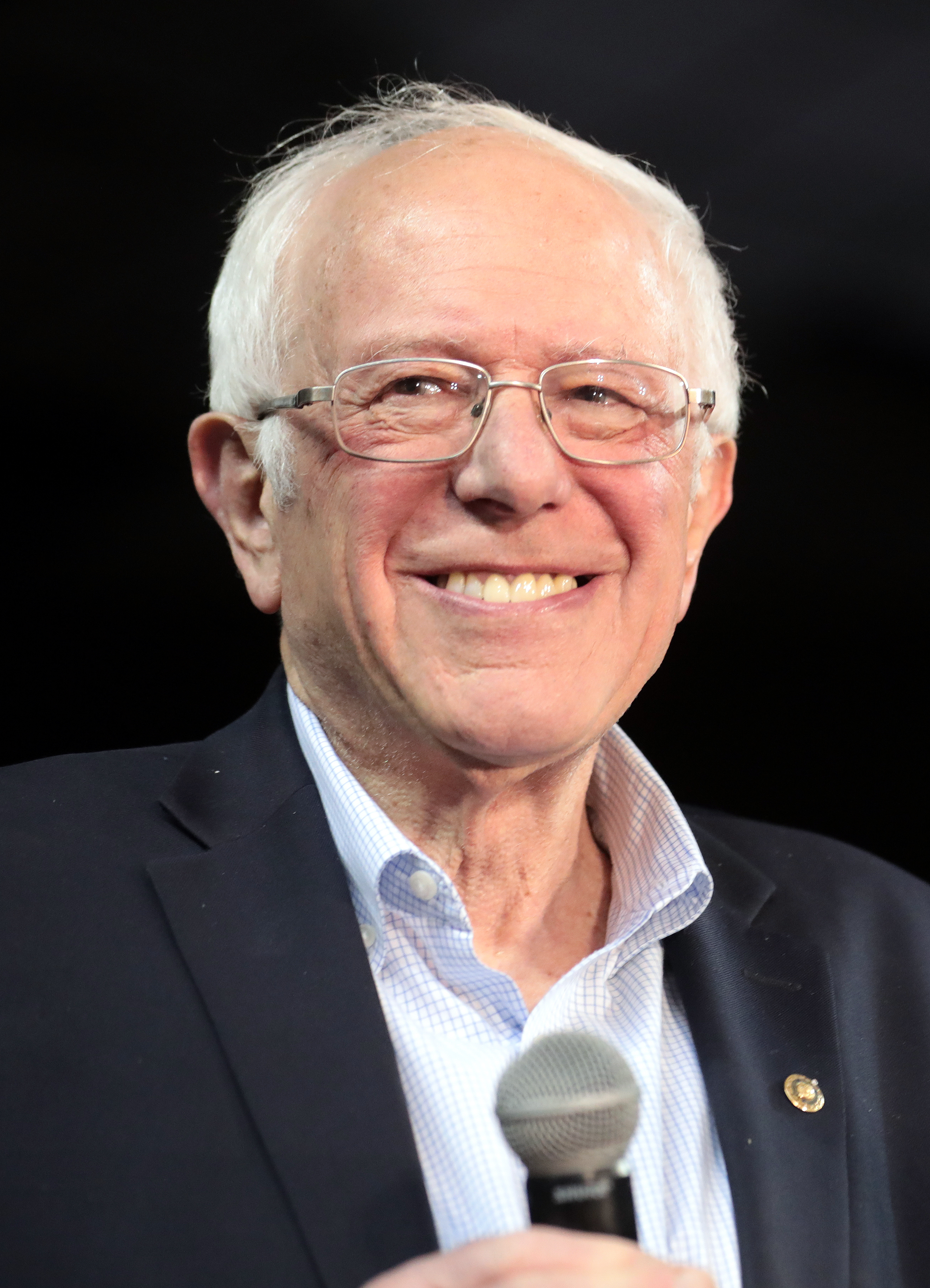
Bernie Sanders

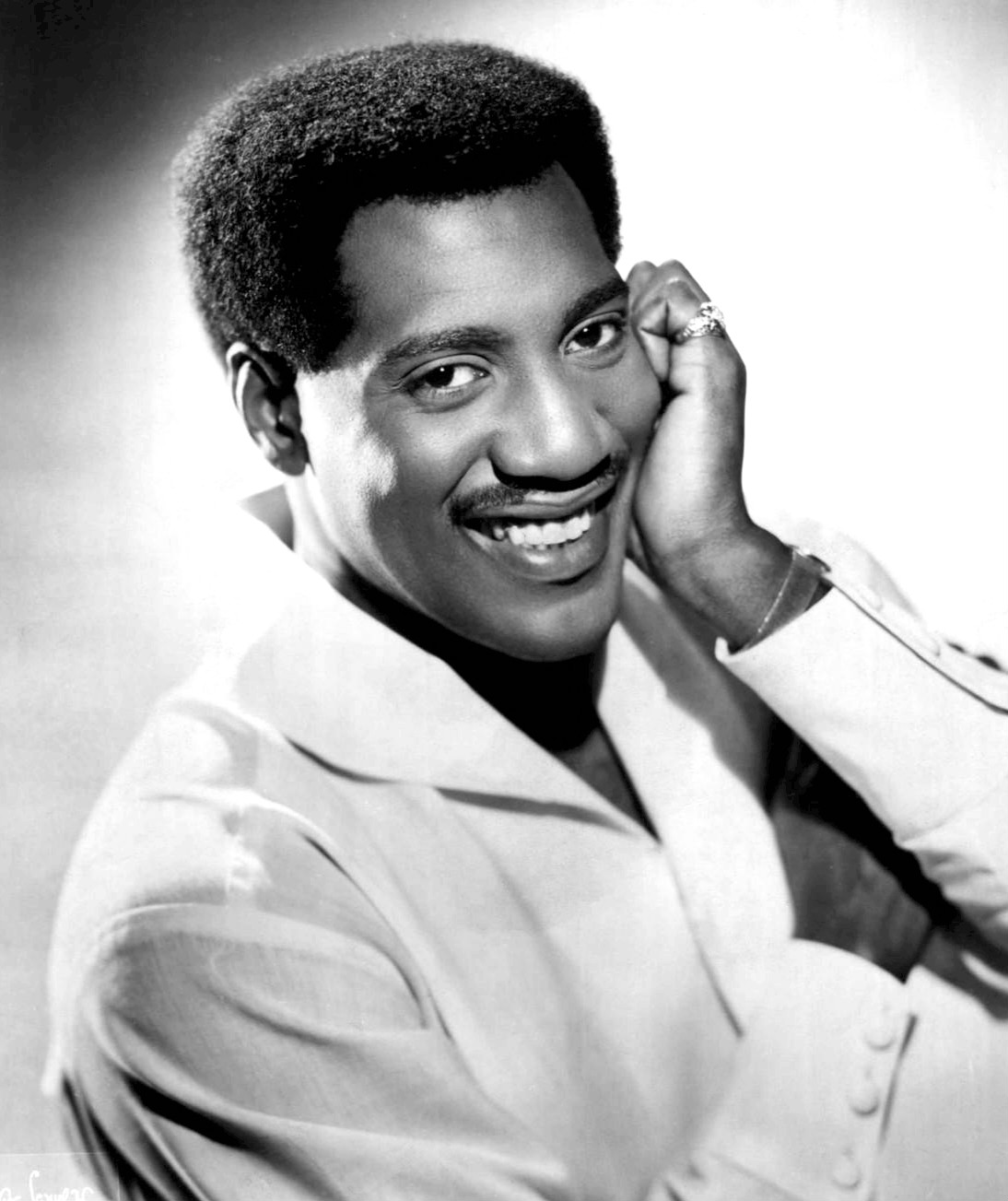
Otis Redding

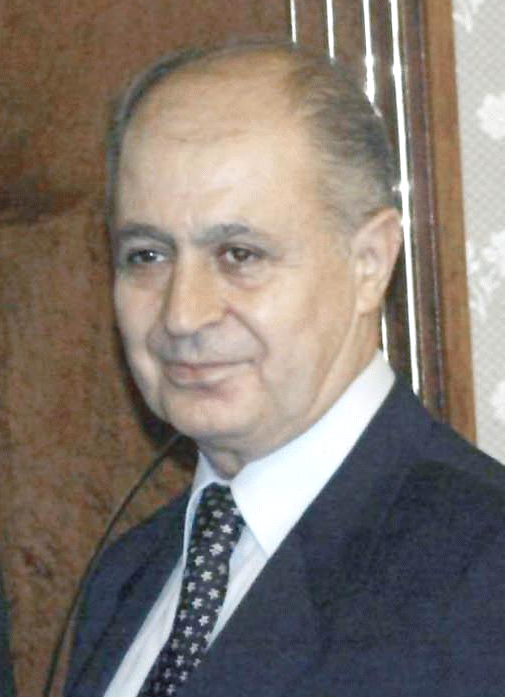
Ahmet Necdet Sezer

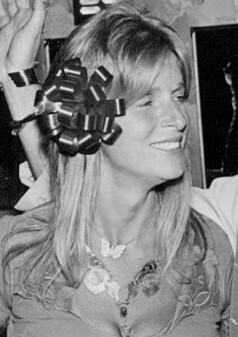
Linda McCartney

- September 2
  - Graeme Langlands, Australian rugby league player (d. 2018)
  - Jyrki Otila, Finnish quiz show judge, Member of the European Parliament (d. 2003)
  - John Thompson, American basketball coach (d. 2020)
- September 3 – Sergei Dovlatov, Russian short-story writer, novelist (d. 1990)
- September 4 – Sushilkumar Shinde, Indian politician
- September 8
  - Christopher Connelly, American actor (d. 1988)
  - Ito Giani, Italian sprinter (d. 2018)
  - Bernie Sanders, American politician, U.S. Senator (D-Vt.) and 2016 presidential candidate
- September 9
  - Otis Redding, African-American singer, musician (Dock of the Bay) (d. 1967)
  - Dennis Ritchie, American computer scientist, creator of the C programming language (d. 2011)
- September 10
  - Christopher Hogwood, English conductor, harpsichordist (d. 2014)
  - Gunpei Yokoi, Japanese computer game producer (d. 1997)
- September 13
  - Tadao Ando, Japanese architect
  - David Clayton-Thomas, Canadian rock & blues vocalist Blood, Sweat & Tears (d. 2026)
  - Ahmet Necdet Sezer, 10th President of Turkey
- September 14 – Alberto Naranjo, Venezuelan drummer and music director (d. 2020)
- September 15
  - Signe Toly Anderson, American rock singer (d. 2016)
  - Etelka Barsi-Pataky, Hungarian politician (d. 2018)
- September 17 – Bob Matsui, U.S. Congressman from California (d. 2005)
- September 18 – Priscilla Mitchell, American country music singer (d. 2014)
- September 19
  - Cass Elliot, American singer (The Mamas & the Papas) (d. 1974)
  - Umberto Bossi, Italian politician (d. 2026)
- September 20 – Dale Chihuly, American glass sculptor
- September 21 – R. James Woolsey Jr., American lawyer and diplomat (d. 2026)
- September 23
  - George Jackson, American activist and author (d. 1971)
  - Navi Pillay, South African jurist, United Nations High Commissioner for Human Rights
- September 24
  - Guy Hovis, American singer (d. 2026)
  - Linda McCartney, American activist, musician and photographer (d. 1998)
  - Jesús Mosterín, Spanish philosopher (d. 2017)
- September 26 – Martine Beswick, British actress, model
- September 27
  - Gay Kayler, Australian country music singer
  - Sam Zell, American publisher and investor (d. 2023)
- September 28 – Edmund Stoiber, German politician
- September 29 – Fred West, English serial killer, suicide (d. 1995)
- September 30 – Angela Pleasence, British actress (d. 2026)

=== October ===
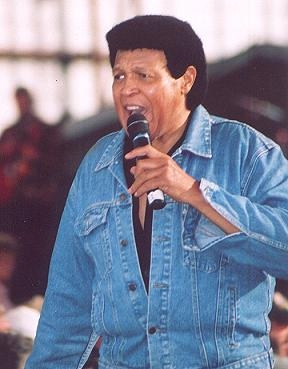
Chubby Checker

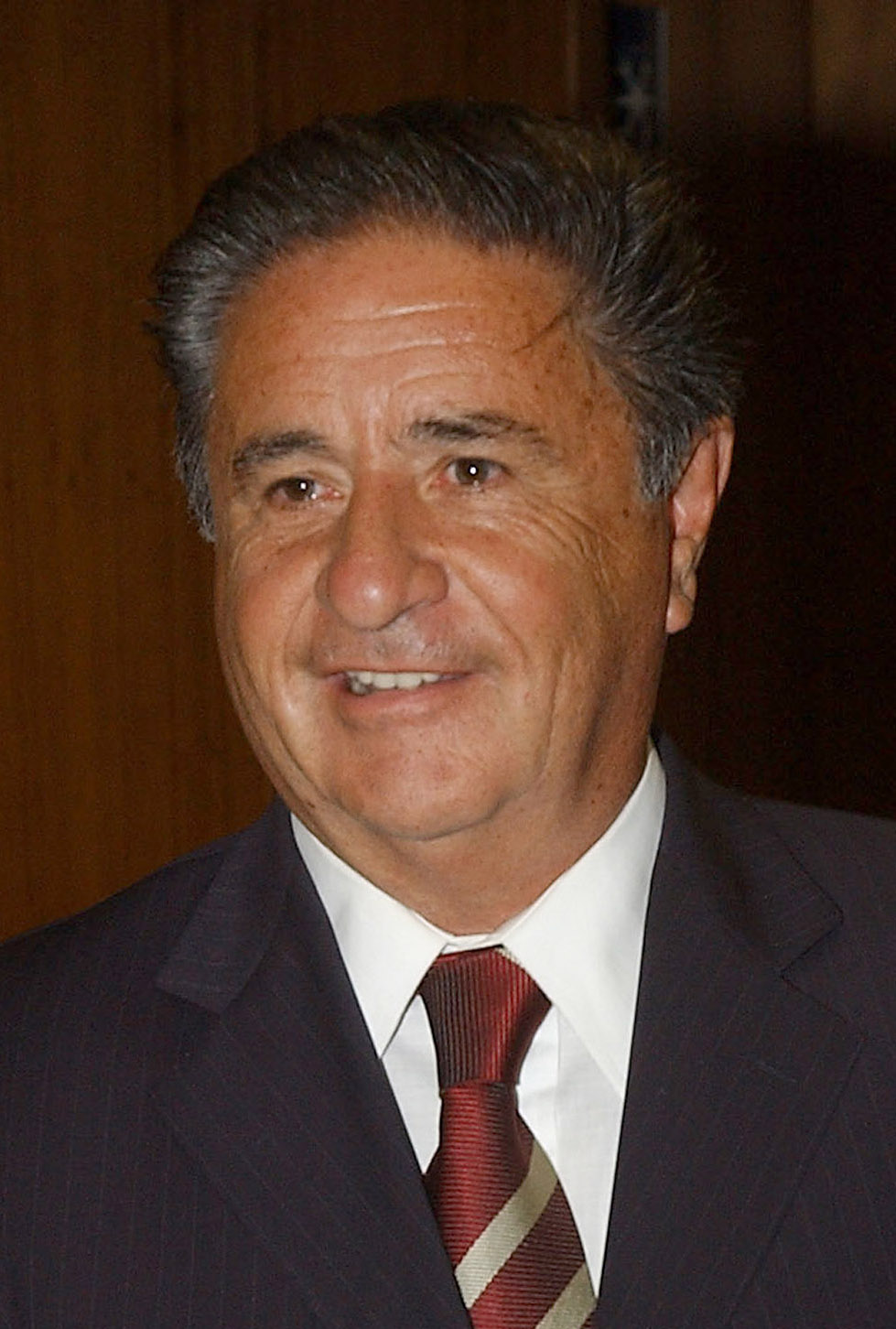
Eduardo Duhalde

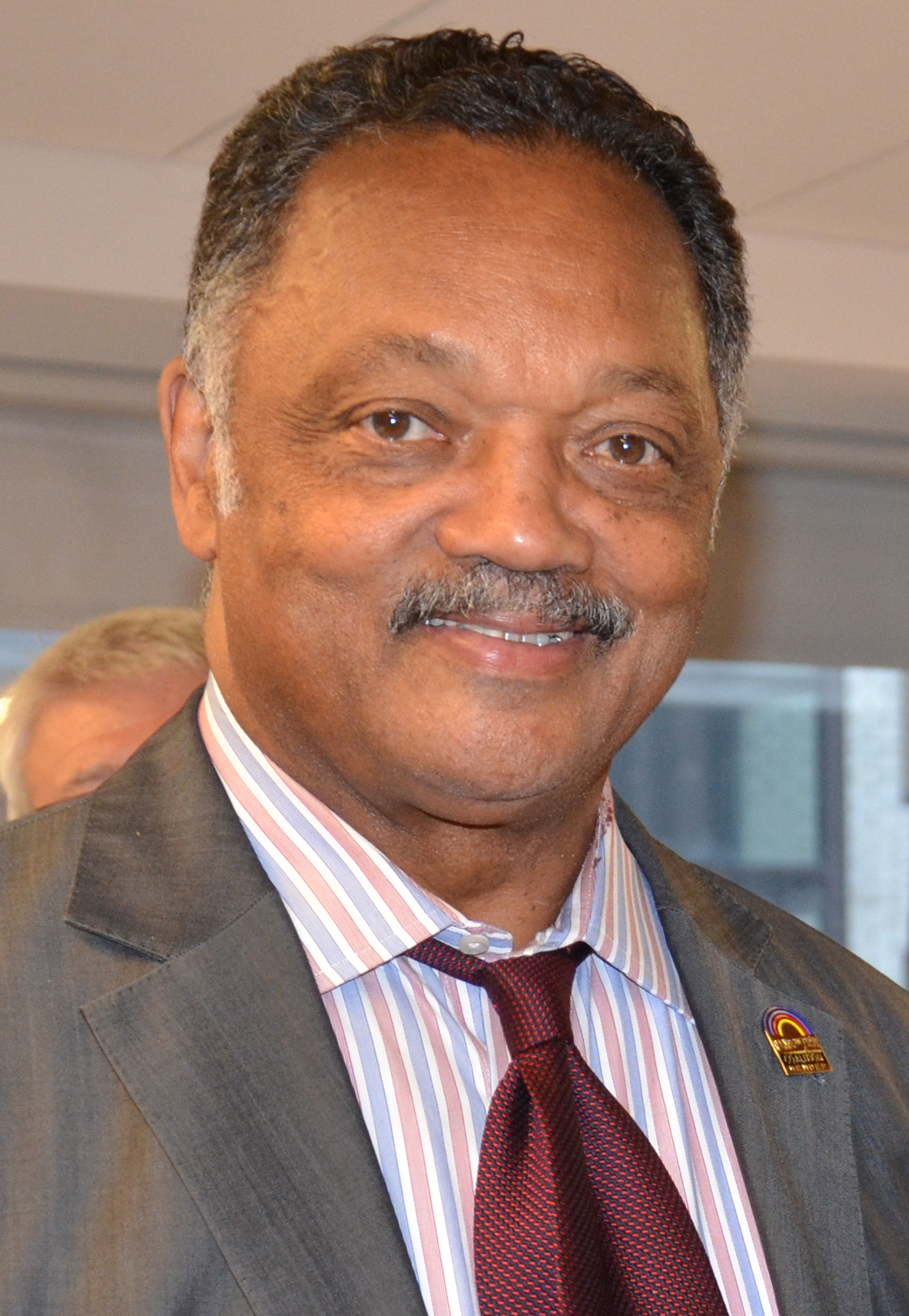
Jesse Jackson

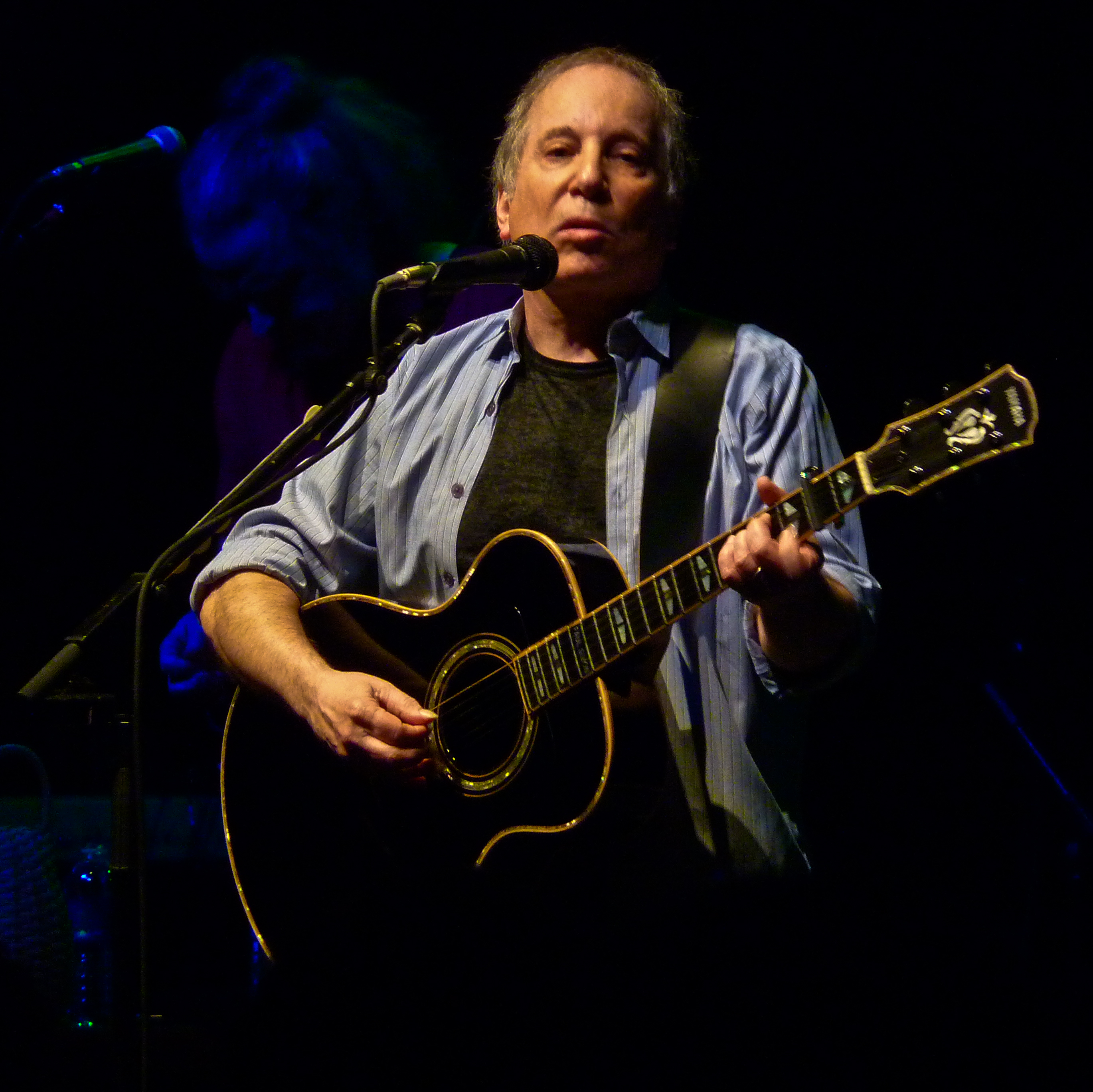
Paul Simon

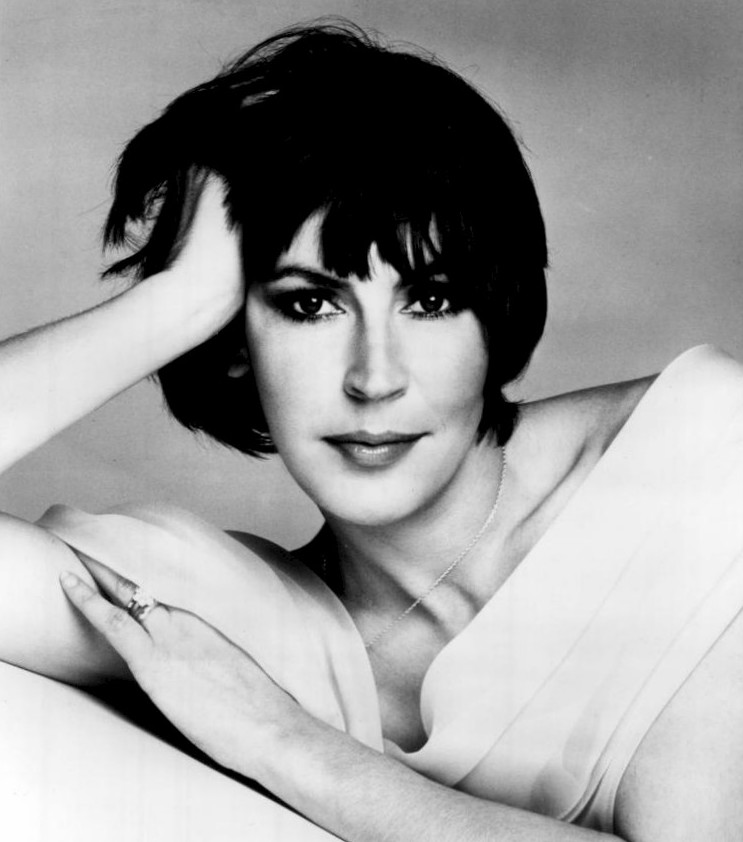
Helen Reddy

- October 1 – Vyacheslav Vedenin, Soviet cross-country skier (d. 2021)
- October 3
  - Chubby Checker, American singer (The Twist)
  - Nicolae Șerban Tanașoca, Romanian historian and philologist (d. 2017)
- October 4
  - Roy Blount Jr., American writer, comedian
  - Elizabeth Eckford, African-American activist, one of the Little Rock Nine
  - Mighty Shadow, Trinidadian calypsonian (d. 2018)
  - Anne Rice, American novelist (d. 2021)
- October 5 – Eduardo Duhalde, 50th President of Argentina
- October 8 – Jesse Jackson, African-American clergyman, civil rights activist and presidential candidate (d. 2026)
- October 9 – Trent Lott, American politician and author
- October 10
  - Peter Coyote, American actor
  - Hanan Goldblatt, Israeli actor
  - Ken Saro-Wiwa, Nigerian writer, television producer and environmental activist (executed 1995)
- October 11 – Valerii Postoyanov, Soviet Olympic sport shooter (d. 2018)
- October 13 – Paul Simon, American singer-songwriter (Simon and Garfunkel)
- October 15
  - Rosie Douglas, 4th Prime Minister of Dominica (d. 2000)
  - Joan Antoni Solans Huguet, Spanish urban planner (d. 2019)
- October 16 – Tim McCarver, American baseball player and sportscaster (d. 2023)
- October 17 – Earl Thomas Conley, American country music singer (d. 2019)
- October 19 – Peter Thornley, English professional wrestler best known for the ring character Kendo Nagasaki
- October 24 – Frank Aendenboom, Belgian actor (d. 2018)
- October 25
  - Helen Reddy, Australian singer, actress (I Am Woman) (d. 2020)
  - Anne Tyler, American novelist
- October 27 – Gerd Brantenberg, Norwegian feminist author, gay rights activist
- October 28
  - John Hallam, Irish actor (d. 2006)
  - Hank Marvin, English beat guitarist and singer-songwriter (The Shadows)
- October 30 – Theodor W. Hänsch, German physicist, Nobel Prize in Physics recipient
- October 31 – Sally Kirkland, American actress (d. 2025)

=== November ===
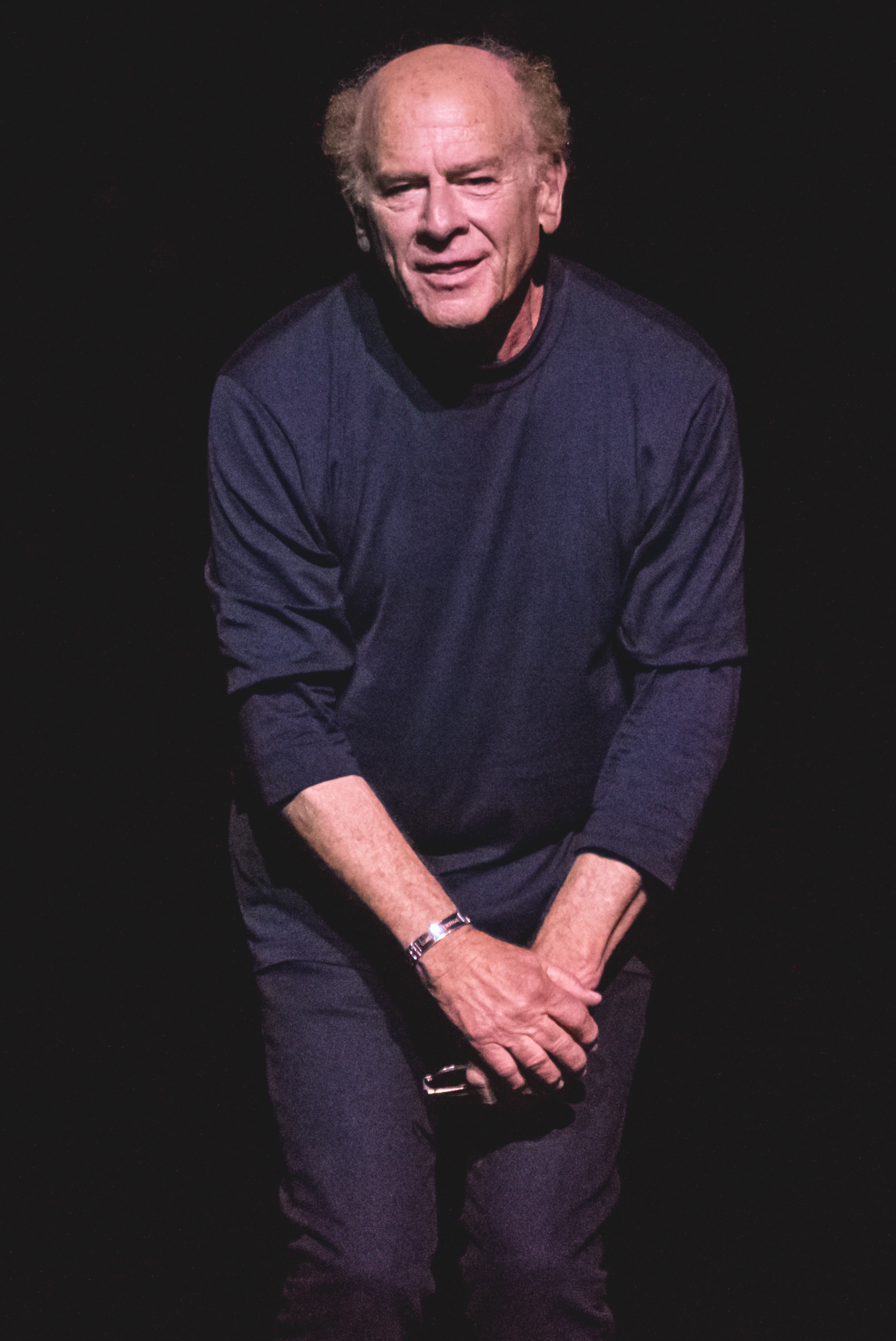
Art Garfunkel

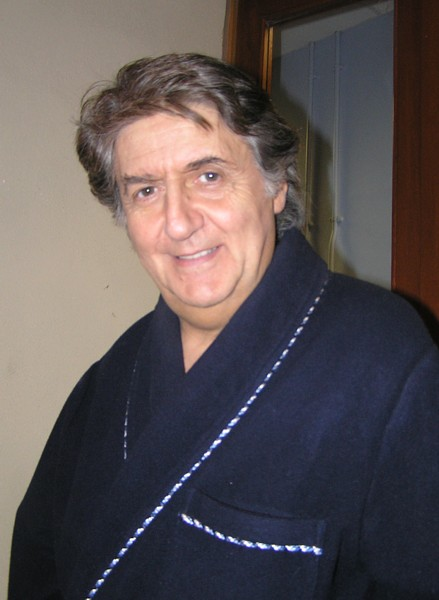
Tom Conti

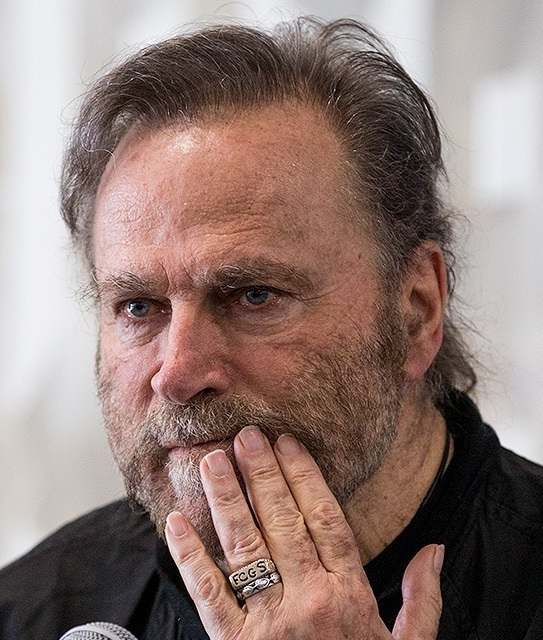
Franco Nero

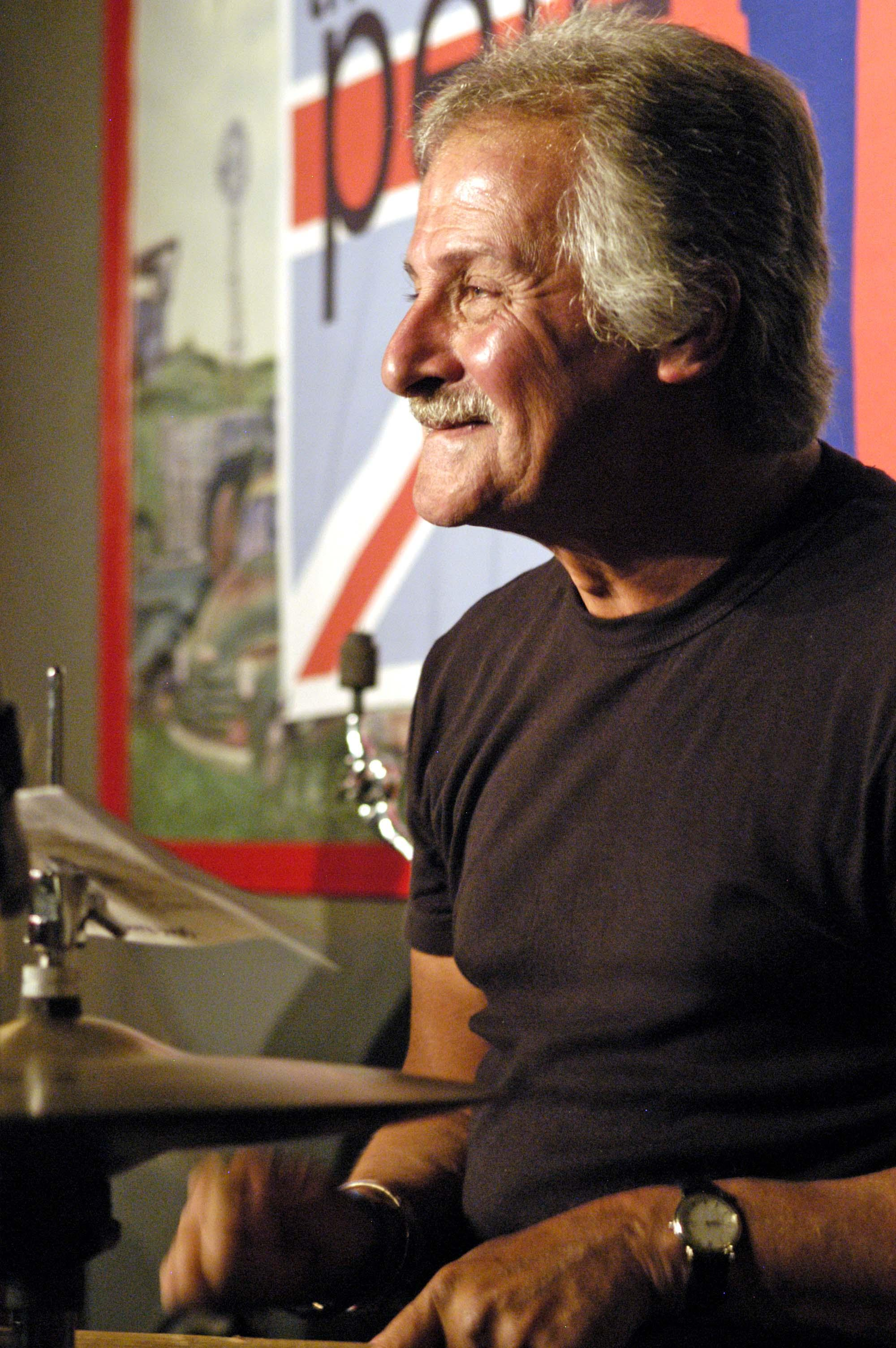
Pete Best

- November 1
  - Marina Baura, Spanish actress
  - Nigel Dempster, British journalist, author, broadcaster and diarist (d. 2007)
  - Robert Foxworth, American actor
- November 2 – Bruce Welch, British guitarist and singer-songwriter
- November 2 – Arun Shourie, Indian author and economist
- November 5 – Art Garfunkel, American singer
- November 6 – Guy Clark, American folk singer-songwriter (d. 2016)
- November 7 – Angelo Scola, Italian cardinal
- November 9 – Tom Fogerty, American guitarist (Creedence Clearwater Revival) (d. 1990)
- November 13 – Dack Rambo, American actor (d. 1994)
- November 17 – Tova Traesnaes, Norwegian-American cosmetician and businesswoman; wife of actor Ernest Borgnine (d. 2022)
- November 18 – David Hemmings, English actor (d. 2003)
- November 19 – Dan Haggerty, American actor (Grizzly Adams) (d. 2016)
- November 20 – Dr. John, American singer and songwriter (d. 2019)
- November 21 – İdil Biret, Turkish pianist
- November 22 – Tom Conti, Scottish actor
- November 23
  - Derek Mahon, Irish poet (d. 2020)
  - Franco Nero, Italian actor
- November 24 – Pete Best, English drummer
- November 25
  - Ralph Haben, American politician, Speaker of the Florida House of Representatives (d. 2026)
  - Percy Sledge, African-American singer (d. 2015)
  - Riaz Ahmed Gohar Shahi, Pakistani Sufi author, poet
- November 27
  - Tom Morga, American stuntman, stunt coordinator and actor.
  - Henry Carr, American Olympic athlete (d. 2015)
  - Aimé Jacquet, French football player, manager
  - Eddie Rabbitt, American country musician (d. 1998)
- November 28 – Laura Antonelli, Italian actress (d. 2015)
- November 29
  - Lothar Emmerich, German footballer (d. 2003)
  - Bill Freehan, American baseball player (d. 2021)

=== December ===
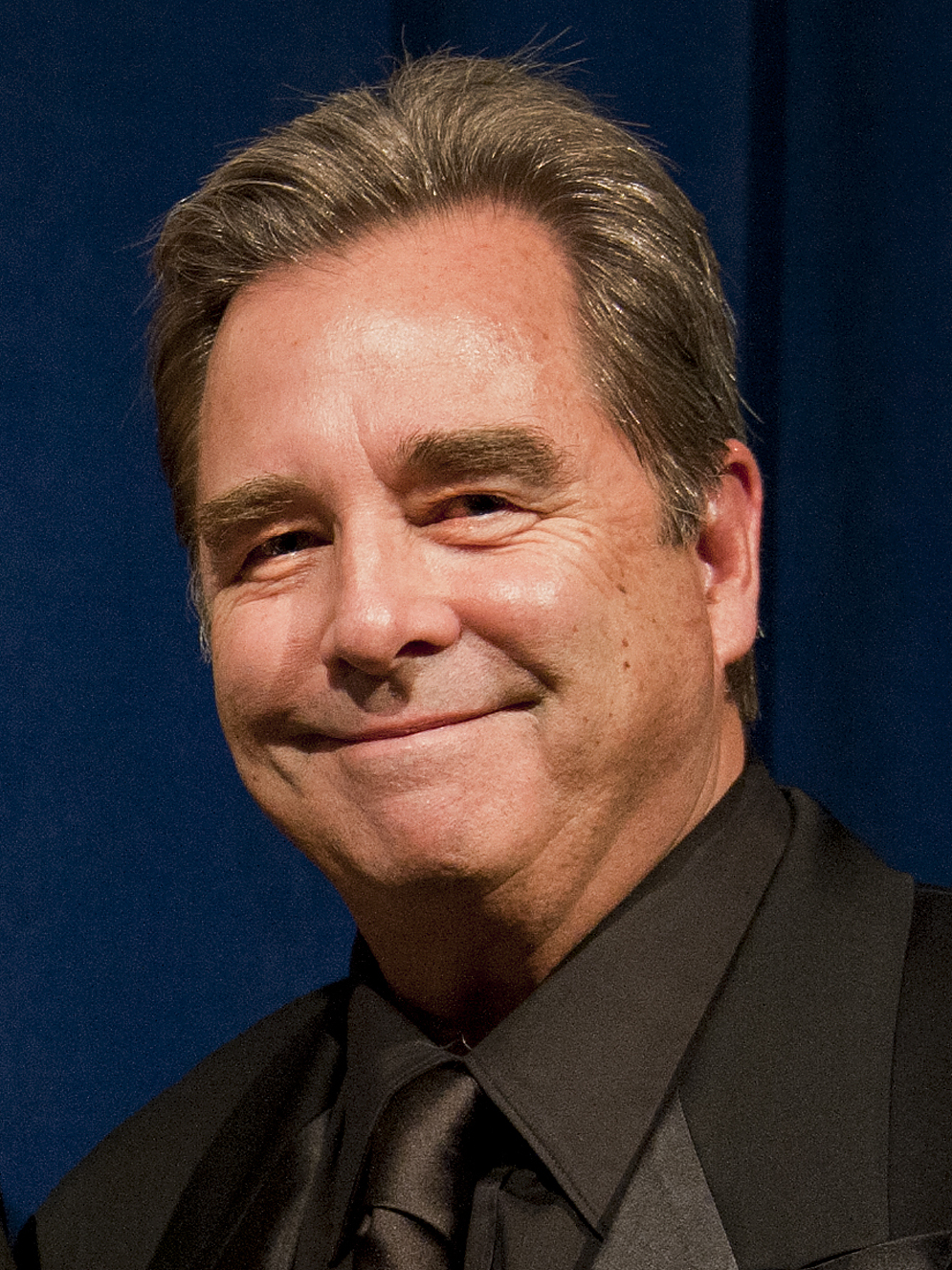
Beau Bridges

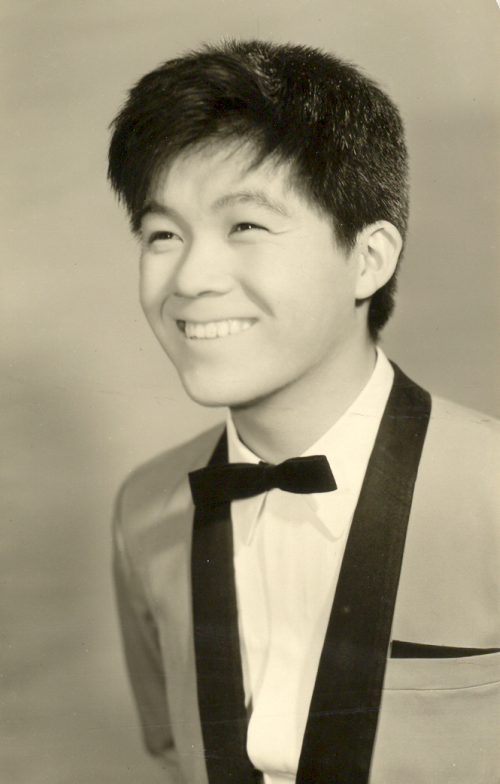
Kyu Sakamoto

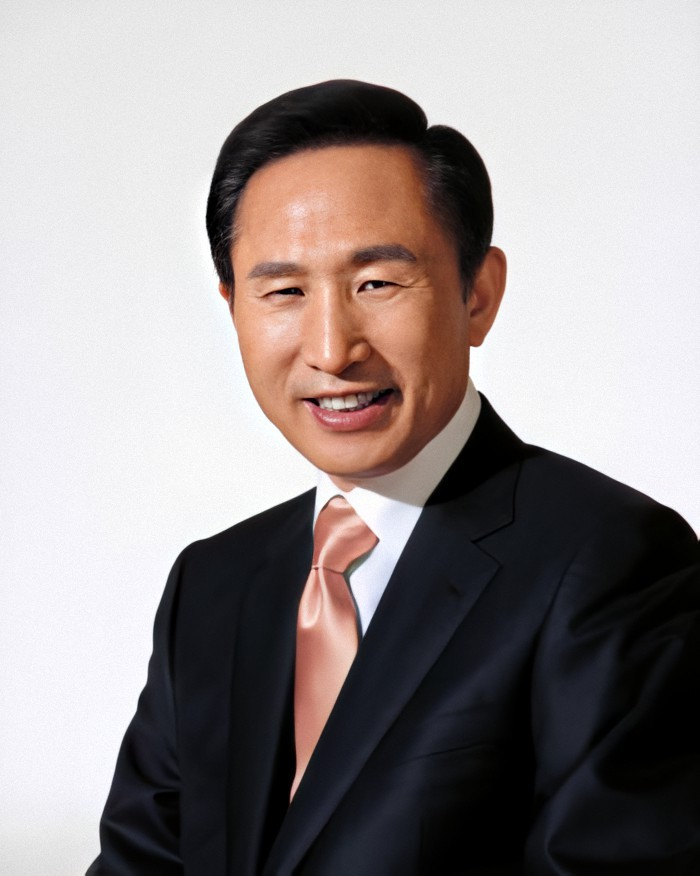
Lee Myung-bak

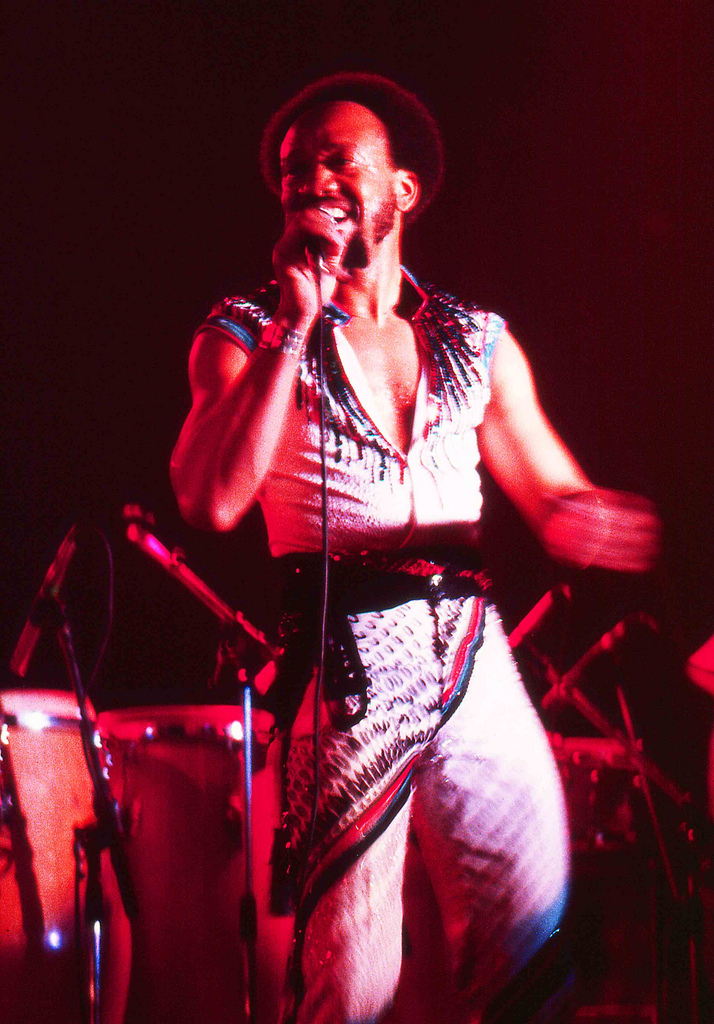
Maurice White

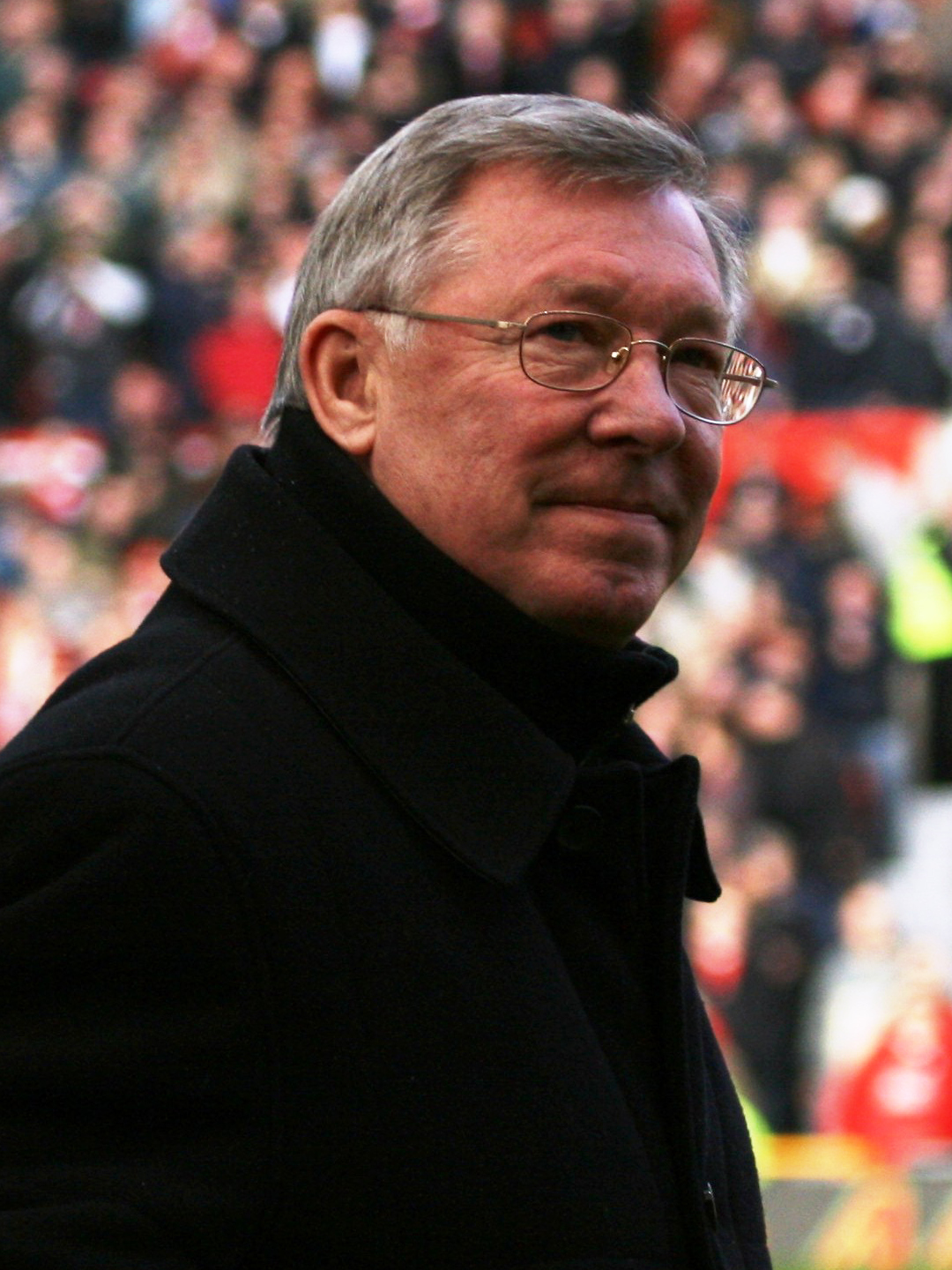
Sir Alex Ferguson

- December 1
  - Nigel Rodley, English international human rights lawyer (d. 2017)
  - Sean S. Cunningham, American filmmaker, director, producer and writer
- December 4
  - David Johnston, Australian newsreader
  - Leila Säälik, Estonian actress
- December 6
  - Richard Speck, American mass murderer (d. 1991)
  - Wende Wagner, American actress (d. 1997)
- December 8 – Geoff Hurst, English footballer
- December 9 – Beau Bridges, American actor
- December 10
  - Tommy Rettig, American actor (d. 1996)
  - Kyu Sakamoto, Japanese singer, actor ("Sukiyaki") (d. 1985)
  - Peter Sarstedt, English singer-songwriter (d. 2017)
- December 12 – Vitaly Solomin, Soviet and Russian actor, director and screenwriter (d. 2002)
- December 13 – John Davidson, American singer, actor
- December 16
  - Poldy Bird, Argentine writer (d. 2018)
  - Vittorio Mezzogiorno, Italian actor (d. 1994)
- December 19
  - Lee Myung-bak, 17th President of the Republic of Korea
  - Maurice White, African-American singer-songwriter, musician and record producer (d. 2016)
- December 21
  - Lo Hoi-pang, Hong Kong-born Chinese actor
  - Jared Martin, American actor (d. 2017)
- December 23
  - Ron Bushy, American rock musician (d. 2021)
  - Tim Hardin, American folk musician (d. 1980)
  - Mamnoon Hussain, 12th President of Pakistan (d. 2021)
- December 24
  - Hans Eichel, German politician
  - Lex Hixon, American Sufi author, poet and spiritual teacher (d. 1995)
- December 27
  - Miles Aiken, American basketball player and coach
  - Younoussi Touré, 4th prime minister of Mali (d. 2022)
- December 29 – Ray Thomas, English flautist, singer and songwriter (The Moody Blues) (d. 2018)
- December 30 – Mel Renfro, American football player
- December 31 – Sir Alex Ferguson, Scottish football manager (Manchester United)

== Deaths ==
=== January ===
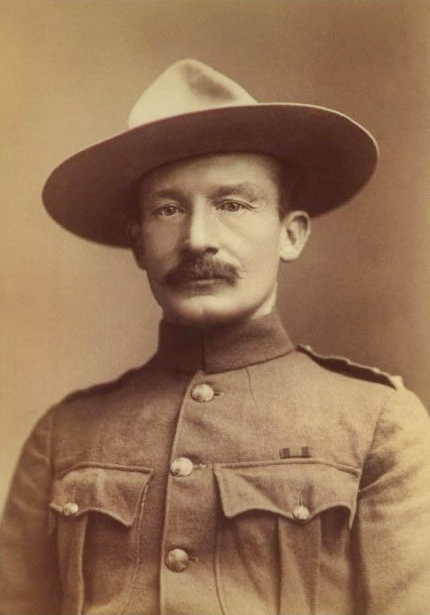
Robert Baden-Powell, 1st Baron Baden-Powell

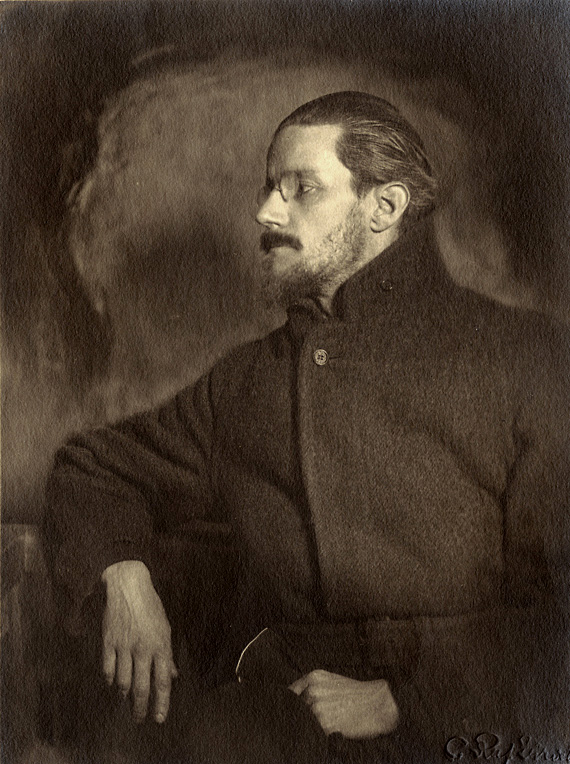
James Joyce

- January 1 – József Konkolics, Hungarian Slovene writer (b. 1861)
- January 4 – Henri Bergson, French philosopher, recipient of the Nobel Prize in Literature (b. 1859)
- January 5 – Amy Johnson, English aviator (aviation accident) (b. 1903)
- January 8
  - Robert Baden-Powell, 1st Baron Baden-Powell, English soldier; founder of the Scouts (b. 1857)
  - Viktor Dankl von Krasnik, Austro-Hungarian general (b. 1854)
- January 9 – Paul Brandon Barringer, American physician and the sixth president of Virginia Tech (b. 1857)
- January 10
  - Frank Bridge, English composer (b. 1879)
  - Sir John Lavery, Anglo-Irish artist (b. 1856)
- January 11 – Emanuel Lasker, German chess champion (b. 1868)
- January 13 – James Joyce, Irish writer, poet (b. 1882)
- January 17 – Virginio Arias, Chilean sculptor and art teacher (b. 1855)
- January 20 – Dennis E. Batt, American political journalist and trade union activist (b. 1886)
- January 21 – Rudolf von Brudermann, Austro-Hungarian general (b. 1851)
- January 24 – Josslyn Hay, 22nd Earl of Erroll, British aristocrat (murder) (b. 1901)
- January 29 – Ioannis Metaxas, Greek military officer, politician and Prime Minister of Greece (b. 1871)

=== February ===
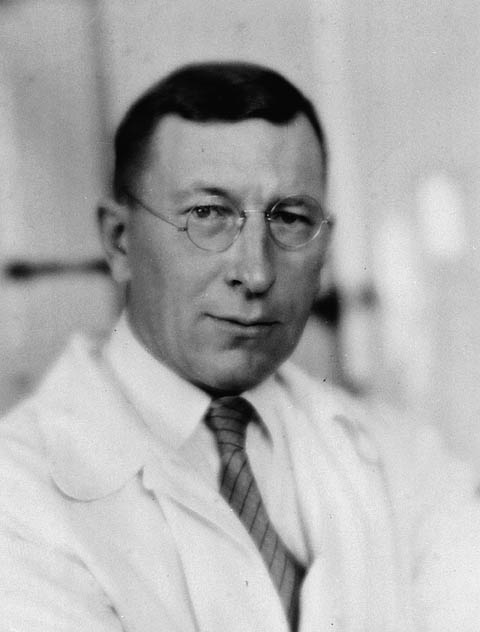
Frederick Banting

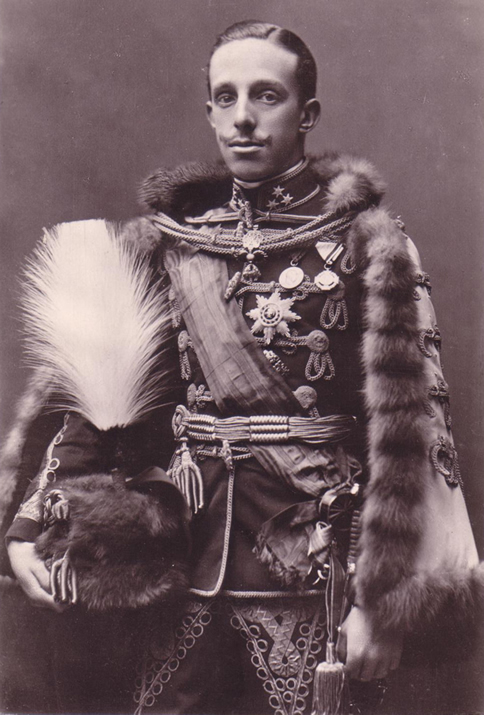
King Alfonso XIII of Spain

- February 2 – Harris Laning, American admiral (b. 1873)
- February 4 – George Lloyd, 1st Baron Lloyd, British politician and diplomat (b. 1879)
- February 5
  - Banjo Paterson, Australian poet and journalist (b. 1864)
  - Otto Strandman, 1st Prime Minister of Estonia (b. 1875)
- February 7 – Giuseppe Tellera, Italian general (died of wounds) (b. 1882)
- February 9
  - Aaron S. Watkins, American temperance movement leader (b. 1863)
  - Elizabeth von Arnim, Australian born English writer (b. 1866)
- February 11 – Rudolf Hilferding, German economist, Minister of Finance (b. 1877)
- February 13 – Blind Boy Fuller, African-American blues musician (b. 1904)
- February 15
  - Pavel Blonsky, Soviet Russian psychologist, philosopher and founder of Soviet paedology (b. 1884)
  - Guglielmo Pecori Giraldi, Italian nobleman, general and politician (b. 1856)
- February 20 – Carlos Baca-Flor, Peruvian painter (b. 1869)
- February 21
  - Sir Frederick Banting, Canadian physician, recipient of the Nobel Prize in Physiology or Medicine (b. 1891)
  - Walter T. Bailey, American architect (b. 1882)
- February 22 – Đuro Arnold, Croatian writer and philosopher (b. 1853)
- February 23 – Sister Blandina, Italian-born American Sister of Charity of Cincinnati and missionary (b. 1850)
- February 24 – Lothar von Arnauld de la Perière, German submarine commander (b. 1886)
- February 27 – William D. Byron, U.S. Congressman (b. 1895)
- February 28 – Alfonso XIII, deposed King of Spain (b. 1886)

=== March ===
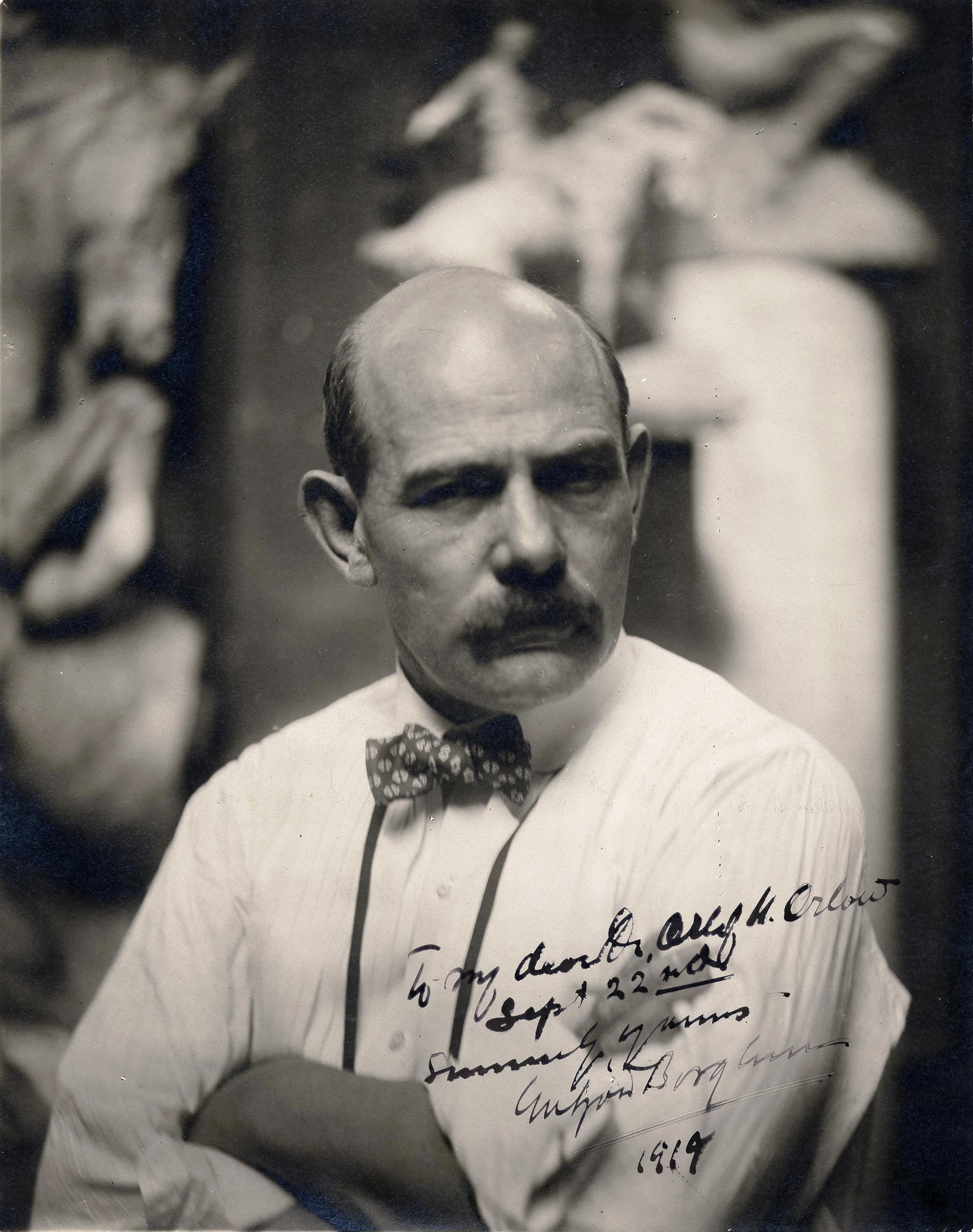
Gutzon Borglum

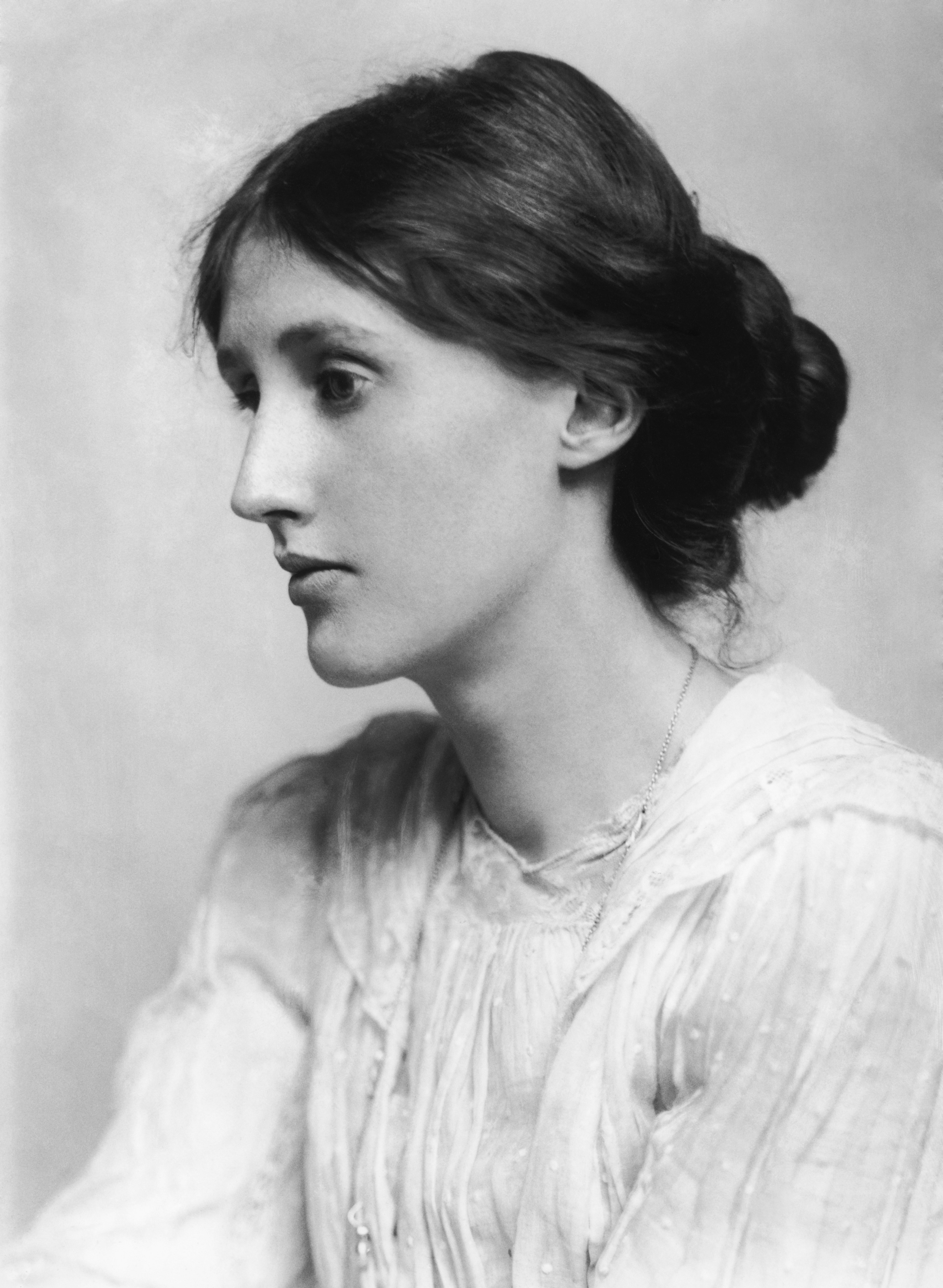
Virginia Woolf

- March 3 – Bernard van Beek, Dutch painter (b. 1875)
- March 4 – Ludwig Quidde, German activist, politician and Nobel Prize laureate (b. 1858)
- March 6
  - Gutzon Borglum, American sculptor (Mount Rushmore) (b. 1867)
  - Francis Aveling, Canadian psychologist and Catholic priest (b. 1875)
- March 8
  - Sherwood Anderson, American author (b. 1876)
  - Ken "Snakehips" Johnson, British band-leader and dancer (b. 1914)
  - Günther Prien, German submarine commander (b. 1908)
- March 13 – Geoffrey Allard, British WWII flying ace (b. 1912)
- March 14 – C. R. M. F. Cruttwell, English historian (b. 1887)
- March 15 – Alexej von Jawlensky, Russian painter (b. 1864)
- March 17 – Joachim Schepke, German submarine commander (killed in action) (b. 1912)
- March 18 – Alexander Pfänder, German philosopher (b. 1870)
- March 28
  - Kavasji Jamshedji Petigara, Indian police commissioner (b. 1877)
  - Virginia Woolf, English novelist (suicide) (b. 1882)
- March 30 – Vasil Kutinchev, Bulgarian general (b. 1859)
- March 31 – Lujo Bakotić, Serbian writer, publicist, lawyer, lexicographer and diplomat (b. 1867)

=== April ===
- April 3 – Pál Teleki, 2-time Prime Minister of Hungary (b. 1879)
- April 5 – Sir Nigel Gresley, English steam locomotive engineer (Flying Scotsman and Mallard) (b. 1876)
- April 13 – Annie Jump Cannon, American astronomer (b. 1863)
- April 16
  - Josiah Stamp, 1st Baron Stamp, British banker, civil servant, industrialist, economist and statistician (enemy action) (b. 1880)
  - Émile Bernard, French painter (b. 1868)
- April 17 – Hans Driesch, German biologist, philosopher (b. 1867)
- April 24
  - Karin Boye, Swedish poet and novelist (b. 1900)
  - King Sisowath Monivong of Cambodia (b. 1875)
- April 30 – Edwin S. Porter, American film director (b. 1870)

=== May ===
- May 2 – Craigie Aitchison, Scottish politician and judge (b. 1882)
- May 6
  - Shūzō Kuki, Japanese philosopher (b. 1888)
  - Ernest Simpson, American-born British shipbroker (d. 1948)
- May 7 – James George Frazer, Scottish social anthropologist (b. 1854)
- May 11 – Peggy Shannon, American actress (b. 1907)
- May 12 – Ruth Stonehouse, American actress (b. 1892)
- May 14 – Maurice Bavaud, Swiss theology student who attempted to assassinate Adolf Hitler in 1938 (b. 1916)
- May 16
  - Noel Agazarian, British World War II fighter ace (b. 1916)
  - Minnie Vautrin, American missionary, heroine of the Nanjing Massacre (b. 1887)
- May 23 – Herbert Austin, English automobile designer and builder who founded Austin Motor Company (b. 1866)
- May 24 – Lancelot Holland, British admiral (died in action) (b. 1887)
- May 27 – Günther Lütjens, German admiral (killed in action) (b. 1889)
- May 29 – Charles Alderton, American pharmacist and the inventor of Dr Pepper (b. 1857)
- May 30 – Prajadhipok, Rama VII, King of Siam (b. 1893)

=== June ===
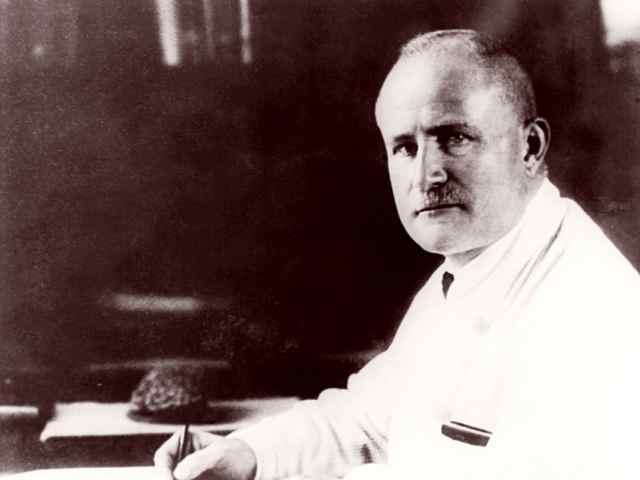
Hans Berger

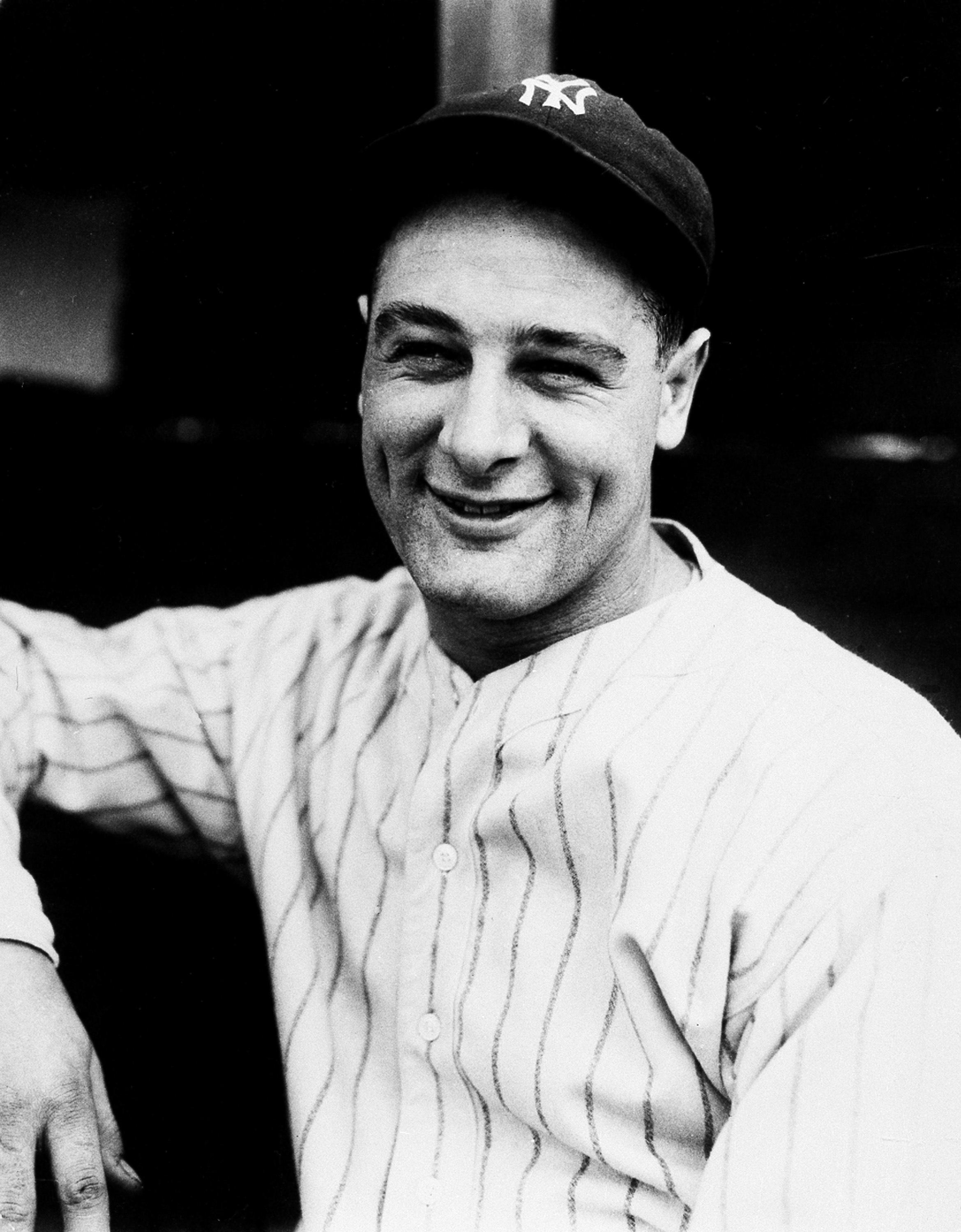
Lou Gehrig

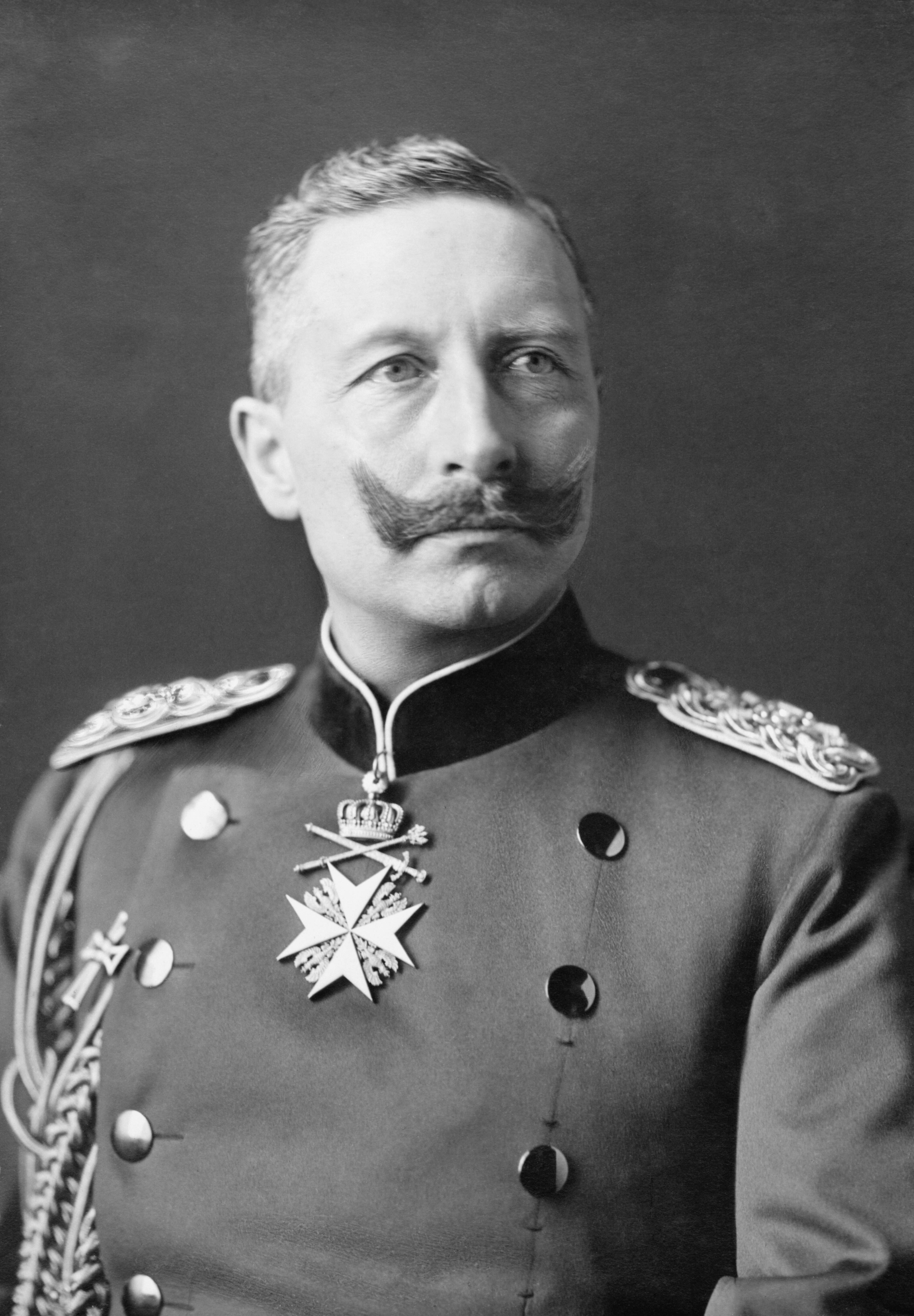
Wilhelm II

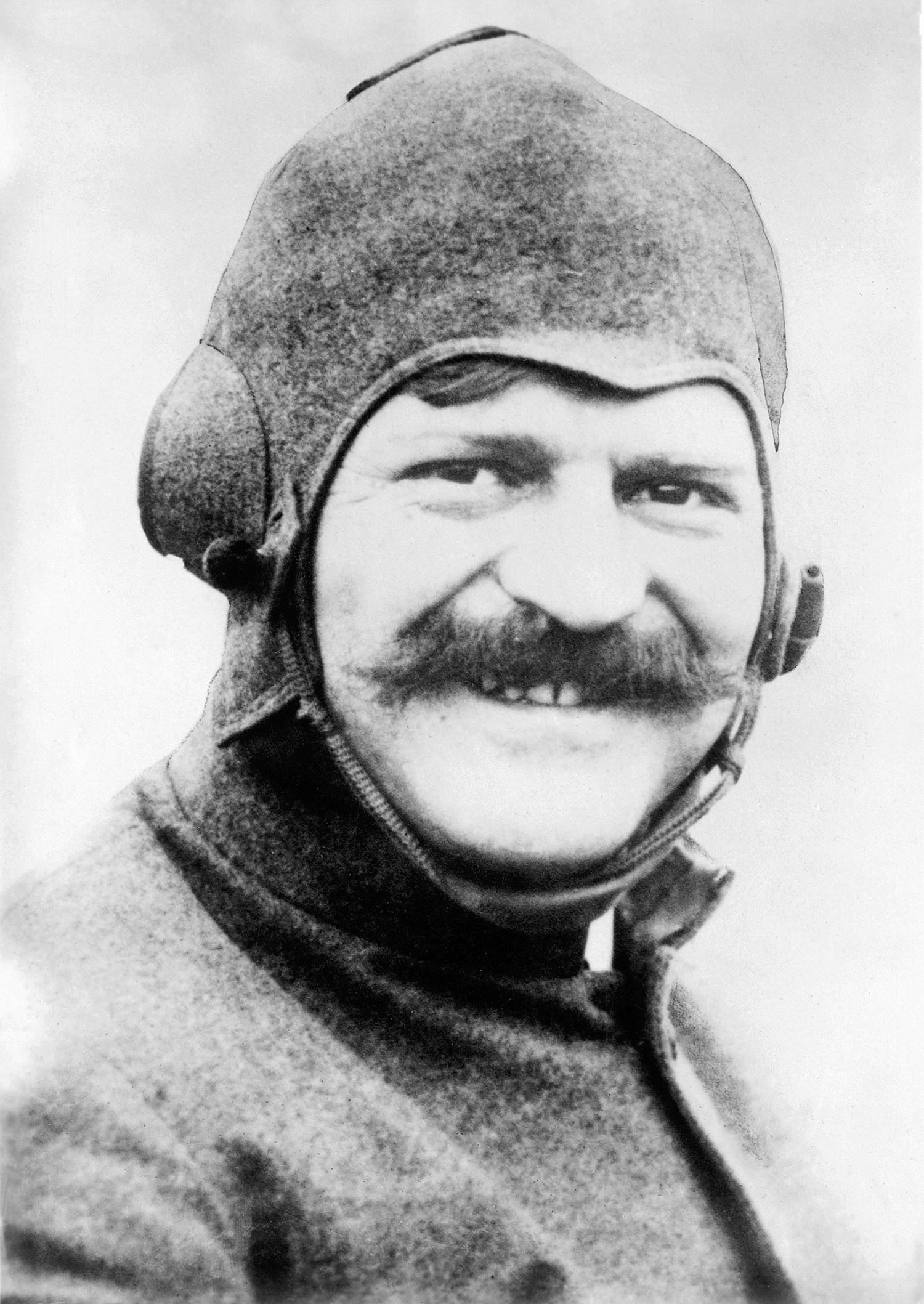
Louis Chevrolet

- June 1
  - Hans Berger, German neurologist (b. 1873)
  - Jenny Dolly, American singer (b. 1892)
  - Sir Hugh Walpole, New Zealand-born British novelist (b. 1884)
- June 2 – Lou Gehrig, American baseball player (New York Yankees), MLB Hall of Famer (b. 1903)
- June 4
  - Wilhelm II, last Emperor of Germany (b. 1859)
  - Morris Michael Edelstein, Polish-American lawyer and politician (b. 1888)
- June 6 – Louis Chevrolet, Swiss-born automobile builder, race car driver (b. 1878)
- June 11 – Daniel Carter Beard, American scouting pioneer (b. 1850)
- June 15 – Evelyn Underhill, English Christian mystic (b. 1875)
- June 18
  - Thomas H. Rynning, American soldier and lawman (d. 1866)
  - Ayyankali, Indian politician, social reformer, educator, economist, lawmaker, and revolutionary leader. (b. 1863)
  - Cecilio Báez, former provisional President of Paraguay (b. 1862)
- June 21 – Elliott Dexter, American actor (b. 1870)
- June 23 – Frederick Gottwald, Austrian-American painter (b. 1858)
- June 25 – Luigi Capello, Italian general (b. 1859)
- June 28 – Richard Carle, American actor (b. 1871)
- June 29 – Ignacy Jan Paderewski, Polish pianist, composer and third Prime Minister of Poland (b. 1860)

=== July ===
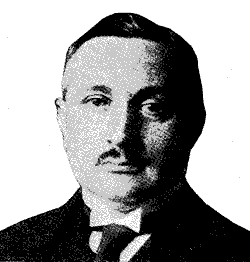
Rudolf Ramek

- July 1
  - Mikhail Kaganovich, Soviet politician (b. 1888)
  - Francis Birtles, Australian adventurer, photographer, cyclist, and filmmaker (b. 1881)
- July 3
  - Friedrich Akel, Estonian diplomat, politician (b. 1871)
  - Mijo Babić, deputy of Ante Pavelić and the first commander of all concentration camps in the Independent State of Croatia(b. 1903)
  - Wilhelm Balthasar, German Luftwaffe military aviator and wing commander (b. 1914)
- July 4 – Antoni Łomnicki, Polish mathematician (b. 1881)
- July 8 – Alexandru Bassarab, Romanian painter, engraver, and fascist politician (b. 1907)
- July 9 – Božidar Adžija, Yugoslav politician and publicist (b. 1890)
- July 10
  - Jelly Roll Morton, African-American jazz musician, composer (b. 1890)
  - Anandyn Amar, former Prime Minister of Mongolia (b. 1886)
  - Andriy Bandera, Ukrainian chaplain and politician (b. 1882)
- July 11 – Arthur Evans, English archaeologist (b. 1851)
- July 15 – Walter Ruttmann, German director (b. 1887)
- July 20 – Lew Fields, American vaudeville performer (b. 1867)
- July 22 – Dmitry Pavlov, Soviet general (executed) (b. 1897)
- July 23 – José Quiñones Gonzales, Peruvian aviator (b. 1914)
- July 24 – Rudolf Ramek, 5th Chancellor of Austria (b. 1881)
- July 25 – Allan Forrest, American actor (b. 1885)
- July 26
  - Henri Lebesgue, French mathematician (b. 1875)
  - Kazimierz Bartel, Polish mathematician, freemason, scholar, diplomat, and former Prime Minister of Poland (b. 1882)
- July 27
  - Homer Galpin, American politician and lawyer (b 1871)
  - Vladimir Klimovskikh, Soviet general (b. 1885)
- July 28 – Pyotr Akhlyustin, Red Army major general (b. 1896)
- July 30
  - Hugo Celmiņš, Prime Minister of Latvia (b. 1877)
  - Mickey Welch, American baseball player, MLB Hall of Famer (b. 1859)
  - Ölziitiin Badrakh, Mongolian politician (b.1895)

=== August ===
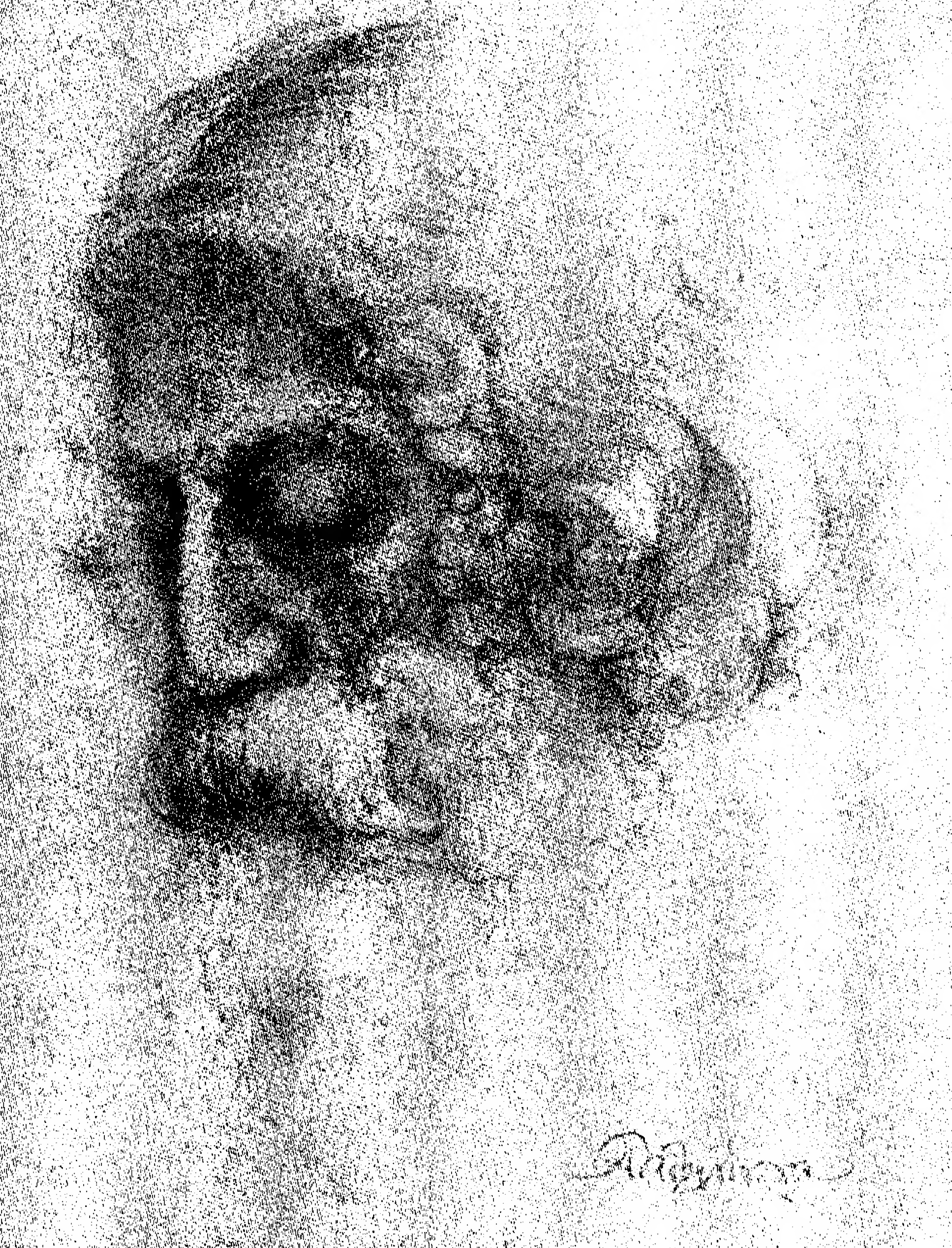
Rabindranath Tagore

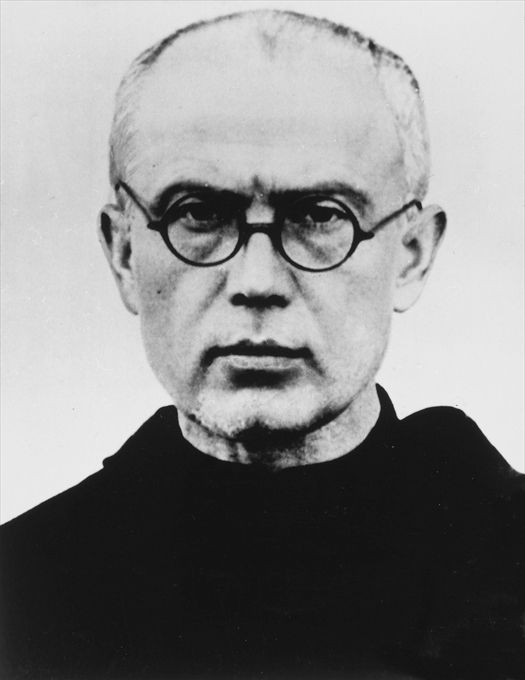
Maximilian Kolbe

- August 1 – James Drake, Australian politician (b. 1850)
- August 4 – Mihály Babits, Hungarian poet, writer, essayist, and translator (b. 1883)
- August 7 – Rabindranath Tagore, Indian author, Nobel Prize laureate (b. 1861)
- August 10 – Ullie Akerstrom, American actress, dancer, playwright, and vaudeville performer (b. 1858)
- August 12 – Freeman Freeman-Thomas, 1st Marquess of Willingdon, British politician and colonial administrator, 22nd Viceroy of India, 13th Governor General of Canada (b. 1866)
- August 13 – J. Stuart Blackton, American film producer (b. 1875)
- August 14
  - Saint Maximilian Kolbe, German Roman Catholic priest (martyred in Auschwitz concentration camp) (b. 1894)
  - Paul Sabatier, French chemist, Nobel Prize laureate (b. 1854)
- August 20 – John Baird, 1st Viscount Stonehaven, British politician, 8th Governor-General of Australia (b. 1874)
- August 21 - Sébastienne Guyot, French Olympic athlete and engineer who specialised in aerodynamic flying (b. 1896)
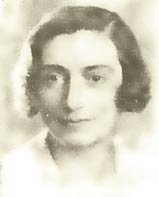
  Sébastienne Guyot
- August 25 – Robert Alexander, United States Army officer (b. 1863)
- August 30 –
  - Anna Colwell, American politician (b. 1876)
  - Peder Oluf Pedersen, Danish engineer and physicist (b. 1874)
- August 31
  - Marina Tsvetaeva, Soviet Russian poet (suicide) (b. 1892)
  - Thomas Bavin, Australian lawyer who served as Premier of New South Wales (b. 1874)

=== September ===
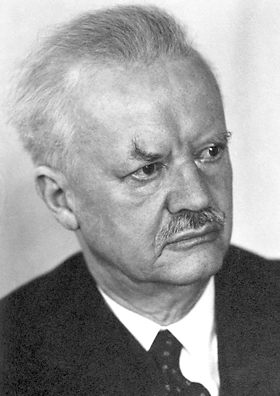
Hans Spemann

- September 1 – Karl Parts, Estonian military commander (b. 1886)
- September 8 – Giuseppe Amisani, Italian painter (b. 1881)
- September 9 – Hans Spemann, German embryologist, recipient of the Nobel Prize in Physiology or Medicine (b. 1869)
- September 11
  - Alipio Ponce, Peruvian police officer, Civil Guard hero (b. 1906)
  - Christian Rakovsky, Bulgarian revolutionary, Russian Bolshevik and Soviet diplomat, journalist, physician and essayist (executed) (b. 1873)
  - Maria Spiridonova, Russian revolutionary, former leader of the Party of Left Socialist Revolutionaries (executed) (b. 1884)
- September 14 – Alicia Amherst, English horticulturist, botanist, and author (b. 1865)
- September 15 – Italia Almirante Manzini, Italian actress (b. 1890)
- September 17 – Iosif Berman, Romanian photographer and journalist (b. 1892)
- September 18
  - Fred Karno, English music hall impresario (b. 1866)
  - Walter Adolph, Luftwaffe military aviator (b. 1913)
- September 20 – Mikhail Kirponos, Soviet general (b. 1892)
- September 29 – Felipe Agoncillo, Filipino lawyer and politician (b. 1859)

=== October ===
- October 5 – Louis Brandeis, U.S. Supreme Court Justice (b. 1856)
- October 8
  - Gus Kahn, German songwriter (b. 1886)
  - Valentine O'Hara, Irish author (b. 1875)
- October 9 – Helen Morgan, American singer and actress (b. 1900)
- October 15 – Eileen Andjelkovitch, British violinist, music educator, and musical director (b. 1896)
- October 16
  - Sergei Efron, Russian poet and secret police operative (executed) (b. 1893)
  - Žanis Bahs, Latvian military general (b.1885)
- October 18 – Manuel Teixeira Gomes, 7th President of Portugal (b. 1860)
- October 25 – Robert Delaunay, French painter (b. 1885)
- October 26
  - Arkady Gaidar, Russian soldier and children's story writer (killed in action) (b. 1904)
  - Victor Schertzinger, American composer, director (b. 1888)
- October 28
  - 20 Soviet military officers and politicians executed in Kuybyshev:
    - Pavel Rychagov (b. 1911)
    - Grigori Shtern (b. 1900)
    - Yakov Smushkevich (b. 1902)
    - Filipp Goloshchekin (b. 1876)
    - Mikhail Kedrov (b. 1878)
    - Aleksandr Loktionov (b. 1893)
- October 29
  - Károly Huszár, 25th Prime Minister of Hungary (b. 1882)
  - Alexander Afinogenov, Russian and Soviet playwright (b. 1904)

=== November ===
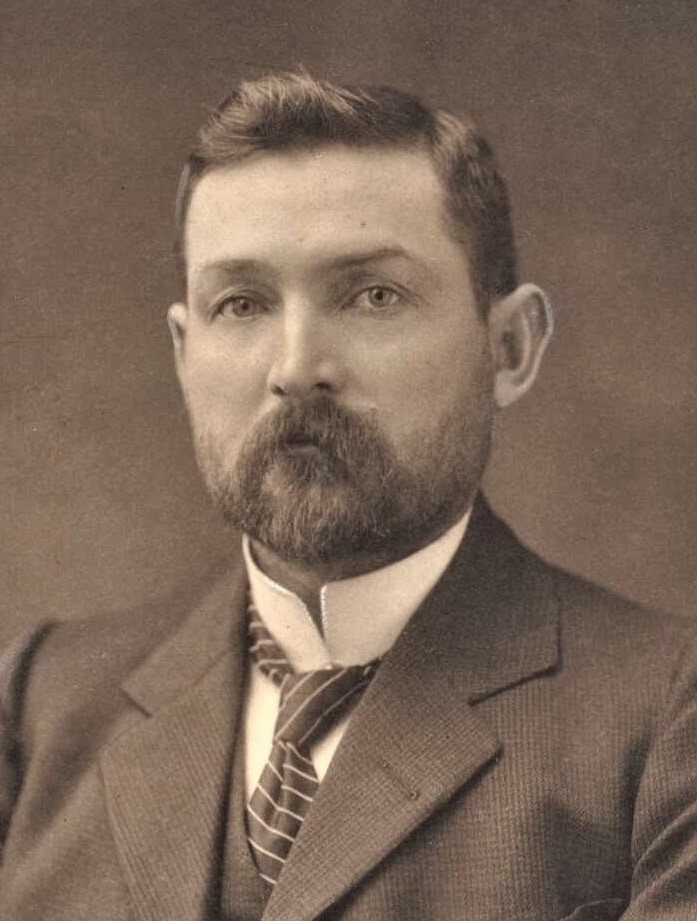
Chris Watson

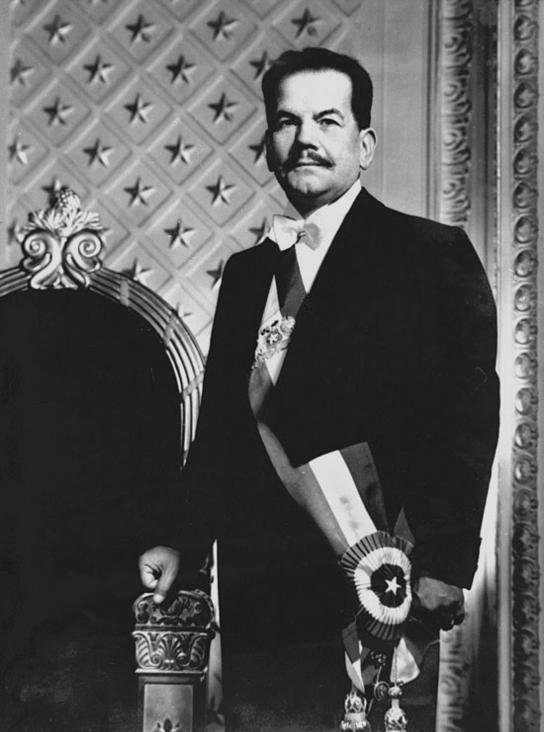
Pedro Aguirre Cerda

- November 7 – Frank Pick, British transport administrator and patron of industrial design (b. 1878)
- November 10 – Carrie Derick, Canadian botanist and geneticist (b. 1862)
- November 16
  - Miina Härma, Estonian composer (b. 1864)
  - Sir Henry Wilson, British general (b. 1859)
- November 17 – Ernst Udet, German World War I fighter ace, Nazi Luftwaffe official (suicide) (b. 1896)
- November 18
  - Émile Nelligan, Canadian poet (b. 1879)
  - Walther Nernst, German chemist, Nobel Prize laureate (b. 1864)
  - Chris Watson, 3rd Prime Minister of Australia (b. 1867)
- November 22
  - Kurt Koffka, German psychologist (b. 1886)
  - Werner Mölders, German fighter pilot (b. 1913)
- November 23
  - Henrietta Vinton Davis, American elocutionist, dramatist, impersonator and public speaker (b. 1860)
  - Clarissa Allen, American educator and author (b. 1859)
- November 25 – Pedro Aguirre Cerda, President of Chile (b. 1879)
- November 26 – Niels Hansen Jacobsen, Danish sculptor, ceramist (b. 1861)
- November 27 – Sir Charles Briggs, British general (b. 1865)
- November 28 – John Manchester Allen, New Zealand politician (b. 1901)

=== December ===
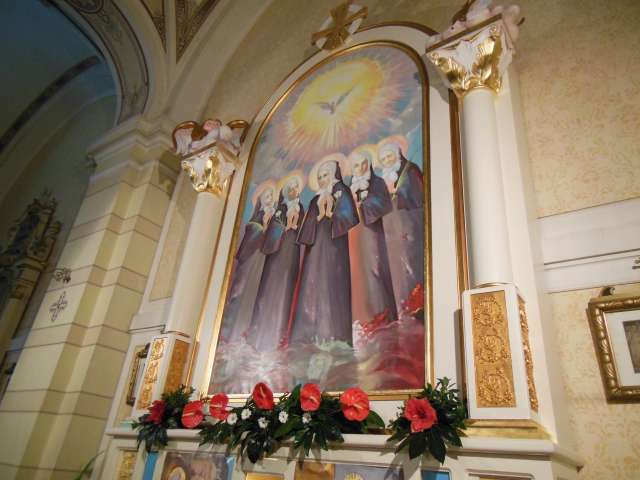
Blessed Martyrs of Drina

- December 2 – Edward Rydz-Śmigły, Polish marshal (b. 1886)
- December 3 – Christian Sinding, Norwegian composer (b. 1856)
- December 6 – Louis Bertrand, French novelist, historian and essayist (b. 1866)
- December 7 – Isaac C. Kidd, American admiral (killed in action) (b. 1884)
- December 8 – Izidor Kürschner, Hungarian football player and coach (b. 1885)
- December 9 – Eduard von Böhm-Ermolli, Austrian general, German field marshal (b. 1856)
- December 10 – Sir Tom Phillips, British admiral (killed in action) (b. 1888)
- December 11 – Émile Picard, French mathematician (b. 1856)
- December 25
  - Richard S. Aldrich, American politician (b. 1884)
  - Blanche Bates, American stage actress (b. 1873)
- December 28
  - Marion Boyd Allen, American painter (b. 1862)
  - Marcel Baschet, French painter (b. 1862)
- December 29
  - Tullio Levi-Civita, Italian mathematician (b. 1873)
  - Luigi Albertini, newspaper editor, politician, and historian (b. 1871)
- December 30 – El Lissitzky, Russian artist, architect (b. 1890)

== Nobel Prizes ==

- Physics – not awarded
- Chemistry – not awarded
- Medicine – not awarded
- Literature – not awarded
- Peace – not awarded
