= Elena Kutorgienė =

Lithuanian physician

- Born: Elena Buivydaitė; 28 July 1888; Šiauliai, Russian Empire
- Died: 13 February 1963 (aged 74); Kaunas, Lithuanian SSR
- Occupation: Physician
- Known for: Rescuing Lithuanian Jews during the Holocaust

Elena Kutorgienė née Buivydaitė (28 July 1888 – 13 February 1963) was a Lithuanian physician who resisted the Nazi occupation of Lithuania during World War II. Kutorgienė and her son took Jewish children out of the Kovno Ghetto and placed them in gentiles' homes to save them from genocide. She is recognized as Righteous Among the Nations.

== Biography ==
Elena Kutorgienė was born Elena Buivydaitė in 1888. She obtained her medical degree from the Imperial Moscow University and moved to Kaunas, Lithuania for work. Kutorgienė specialized in ophthalmology. She began her career at a local Jewish health organization which provided healthcare to impoverished Jews.

From 1941 to 1945, Elena Kutorgienė and her son, Viktoras Kutorga, resisted the Nazi occupation of Lithuania. Kutorgienė hid Jews in her office and her home. She rescued Jewish children from the Kovno Ghetto by hiding them in her home, obtaining false identity papers for them, and placing them in the homes of gentiles. She also brought food into the ghetto. One of the children she helped was Sulamith Gordon, a 14-year-old girl. With Kutorgienė's help, Gordon found work as a live-in maid in a goyische woman's home. Gordon reunited with her father after the war ended. Kutorgienė also tried to persuade other Lithuanian intellectuals to protect their Jewish neighbors and colleagues.

Kutorgienė kept a diary from June 23, 1941, to December 31, 1941. She started the diary a day after Operation Barbarossa, the Nazi invasion of Soviet territories, began. Her diary is valuable to historians because it gives a first-person account of life in Kaunas under Nazi occupation. She wrote of atrocities against the Kaunas Jews, her own work, and of Lithuanian attitudes toward Nazi occupation. She also wrote about the conditions Soviet POWs faced. They were starved and forced to work as slave labor.

In her diary, Kutorgienė wrote, "Lithuania is really of one mind in its hatred of the Jews." Many Lithuanian gentiles were complicit in Nazi atrocities against Jews. For example, Lithuanian civilians and German soldiers alike participated in the Lietūkis garage massacre, part of the Kaunas Pogrom. She received death threats for helping Jewish people.

Elena Kutorgienė also purchased weapons for resistance fighters in the Kovno Ghetto and sent news of the occupation to the USA. She worked with poet and resistance fighter Chaim Yellin; she managed to save his diary.

Kutorgienė died in 1963 and was recognized as Righteous Among the Nations in 1982.
