= The Holocaust in Lithuania =

Genocide of Lithuanian Jews

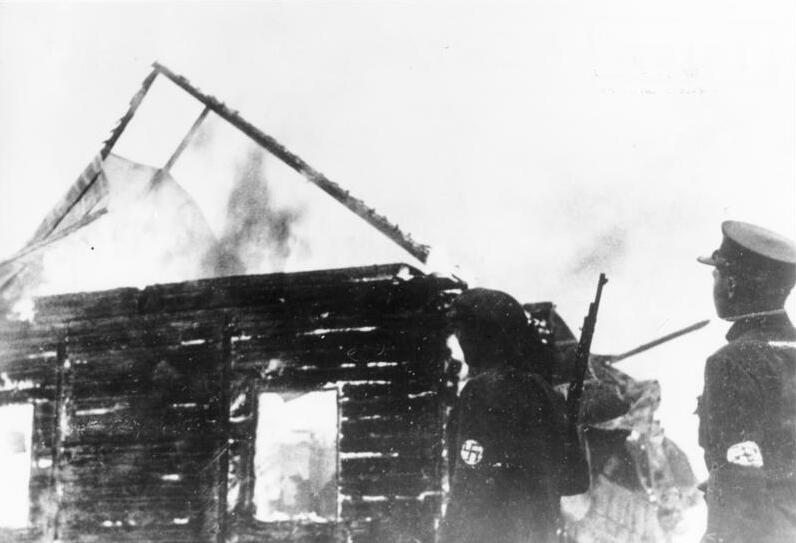
- Burning synagogue in Lithuania.
- Location: German occupied Lithuania
- Date: June–December 1941
- Target: Jews
- Deaths: 190,000–195,000
- Victims: 95%+ of Lithuania's Jewish population killed
- Perpetrators: Einsatzgruppen, Ypatingasis būrys

The Holocaust resulted in the near total eradication of Lithuanian (Litvaks) and Polish Jews^{[a]} in Generalbezirk Litauen of the Reichskommissariat Ostland in the Nazi-controlled Lithuania. Of approximately 208,000–210,000 Jews at the time of the Nazi invasion, an estimated 190,000 to 195,000 were killed before the end of World War II, most of them between June and December 1941. This genocide would also mark the beginning of Hitler's Final Solution. More than 95% of Lithuania's Jewish population was murdered over the three-year German occupation, a more complete destruction than befell any other country in the Holocaust. Historians attribute this to the massive collaboration in the genocide by the non-Jewish local paramilitaries, though the reasons for this collaboration are still debated. The Holocaust resulted in the largest loss of life in so short a period of time in the history of Lithuania.

The events in the western regions of the USSR occupied by Nazi Germany in the first weeks after the German invasion, including Lithuania, marked a sharp intensification of the Holocaust.^{[b]}

The occupying Nazi German administration fanned antisemitism by blaming the Soviet regime's annexation of Lithuania in June 1940, on the Jewish community. One prevalent antisemitic trope at the time linked Bolsheviks and Jews. There were other tropes, even more unpleasant. To a large extent the Nazis also relied on the physical preparation and execution of their orders by local Lithuanian collaborators.

As of 2020, the topic of the Holocaust in Lithuania and the role played by Lithuanians in the genocide, including several notable Lithuanian nationalists, remained unsettled.

== Background ==
After the German and Soviet invasion of Poland in September 1939, the Soviet Union signed a treaty with Lithuania on 10 October, exchanging the predominantly Polish and Jewish city of Wilno (Lithuanian:Vilno) to Lithuania, for military concessions, and subsequently annexed Lithuania in 1940. The German invasion of the Soviet Union on 22 June 1941, came after a year of Soviet occupation that culminated in mass deportations across the Baltics only a week before the German invasion. Some welcomed the Nazis as liberators, and they received support from Lithuanian irregular militias against retreating Soviet forces. Many Lithuanians believed that Germany would allow the re-establishment of the country's independence. To appease the Germans, some people expressed significantly antisemitic sentiments. Nazi Germany, which had seized the Lithuanian territories in the first week of the offensive, used this situation to its advantage and indeed in the first days permitted a Lithuanian Provisional Government of the Lithuanian Activist Front to be established. For a brief period it appeared that the Germans would grant Lithuania significant autonomy, like that given to the Slovak Republic. However, after about a month, the more independent Lithuanian organizations were disbanded and the Germans seized more control.

== Destruction of Jewry ==
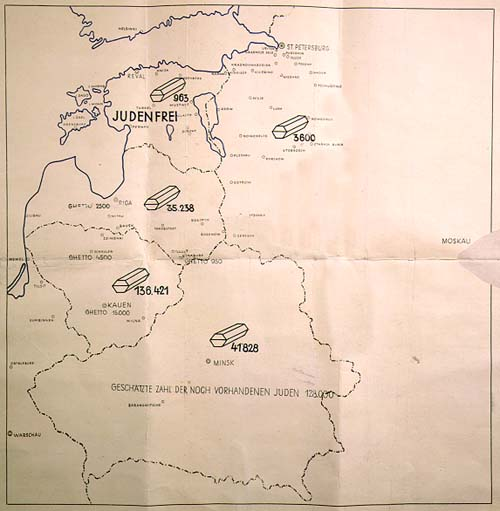
Map titled "Jewish Executions Carried Out by Einsatzgruppe A" from Stahlecker's report. Marked "Secret Reich Matter", the map shows the number of Jews shot in Reichskommissariat Ostland. According to this map the estimated numbers of Jews killed in Lithuania was 136,421 by the date that his map was created.

=== Estimated number of victims ===
Before the German invasion, the Jewish population was estimated at 210,000. The Lithuanian statistics department says there were 208,000 Jews as of 1 January 1941. This estimate, based on the officially accounted-for prewar emigration within the USSR (approx. 8,500), the number of escapees from the Kaunas and Vilnius ghettos, (1,500–2,000), as well as the number of survivors in the concentration camps when they were liberated by the Red Army, (2,000–3,000), puts the number of Lithuanian Jews murdered in the Holocaust at 195,000 to 196,000. The numbers given by historians differ significantly, ranging from 165,000 to 254,000. The higher numbers probably include non-Lithuanian Jews and other Reich (empirical) dissenters labeled as Jewish.

Some intervened to rescue Jews. From 16 July to 3 August 1940, Jan Zwartendijk, the Dutch honorary consul in Kaunas, gave over 2,200 Jews an official third destination in Curaçao, a Caribbean island and Dutch colony that required no entry visa, or Surinam (which, upon independence in 1975, became Suriname). Japanese government official Chiune Sugihara, vice consul for the Empire of Japan in Kaunas, helped some six thousand Jews flee Europe by issuing transit visas so that they could travel through Japanese territory, risking his job and his family's lives. The fleeing Jews were refugees from German-occupied Western Poland and Soviet-occupied Eastern Poland, as well as residents of Lithuania.

=== Holocaust events ===
The Lithuanian port city of Klaipėda (Memel in German) had historically been a member of the German Hanseatic League, and had belonged to Germany and East Prussia before 1918. The city was semi-autonomous in the period of Lithuanian independence, under League of Nations supervision. Of the approximately 6,000 Jews who had lived in Memel, most had already fled when it was absorbed into the Reich on March 15, 1939. The remainder were expelled. Most fled into Lithuania proper, and most of these were killed after the Axis invasion in June 1941.

Chronologically, the genocide in Lithuania can be divided into three phases: phase 1. summer to the end of 1941; phase 2. December 1941 – March 1943; phase 3. April 1943 – mid-July 1944.

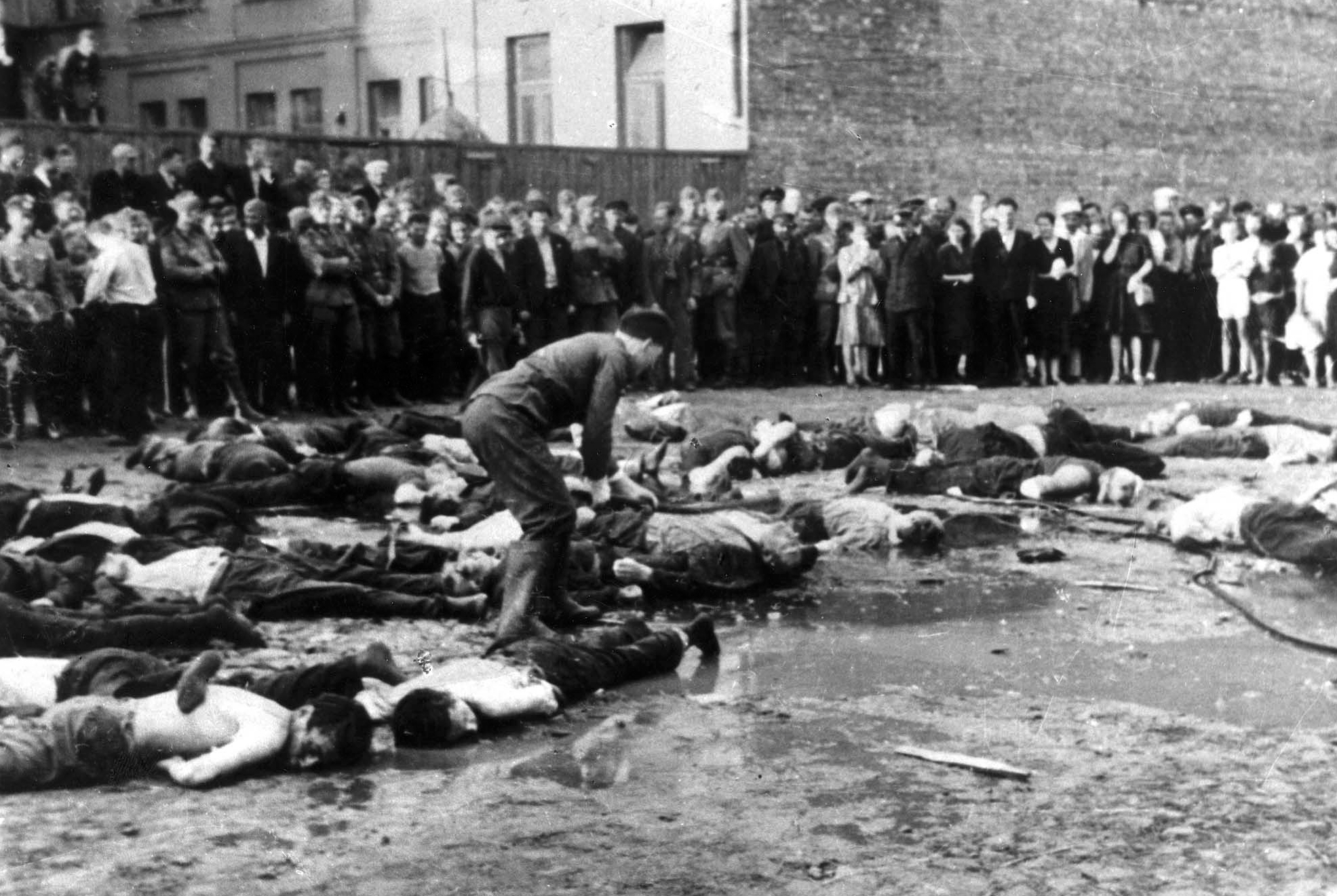
Massacre of Jews by Lithuanians at the Lietūkis garage on 27 June 1941 during the Kaunas pogrom. German soldiers and Lithuanian civilians, including women and children, watch the slaughter from the background

Most Lithuanian Jews perished in the first months of the occupation and before the end of 1941. The Axis invasion of the USSR began on June 22, 1941 and coincided with the June Uprising in Lithuania. During the days before the German occupation of Lithuania the Lithuanian Activist Front attacked Soviet forces, seized power in several cities, spread antisemitic propaganda and carried out massacres of Lithuanian Jews and Poles.

A notable massacre began on the night of 25–26 June, when Algirdas Klimaitis ordered his 800 Lithuanian troops to begin the Kaunas pogrom. Franz Walter Stahlecker, the SS commanding officer of Einsatzgruppe A, told Berlin that by 28 June 1941 3,800 people had been killed in Kaunas and a further 1,200 in the surrounding towns. Klimaitis' men destroyed several synagogues and about sixty Jewish houses. In the 1990s the number of victims claimed by Stahlecker was questioned and thought to have probably been exaggerated.

German Einsatzgruppen followed the advance of the German army units in June 1941 and immediately began organizing the murder of Jews in conquered territories. The first recorded action of the Einsatzgruppen (Einsatzgruppe A) unit took place on June 22, 1941, in the border town of Gargždai (called Gorzdt in Yiddish and Garsden in German), one of the oldest Jewish settlements in the country and only 18 kilometres (11 mi) from Germany's recovered Memel. Approximately 201 Jews were shot that day, in what is known as the Garsden massacre. Some Lithuanian Communists were also among the victims. About 80,000 Jews had been killed by October and about 175,000 by the end of the year.

Most Jews in Lithuania were not required to live in ghettos^{[c]} nor sent to Nazi concentration camps, which at the time were just in the very preliminary stages of operation. They were shot in pits near their homes in the most infamous mass murders, such as the Kaunas massacre of October 29, 1941 at Ninth Fort near Kaunas, and in the Ponary Forest near Vilnius. By 1942 about 45,000 Jews survived, largely those in ghettos and camps.^{[c]}

In the second phase, the Holocaust slowed, and Germans used Jews as forced labor to fuel the German war economy. In the third phase, the destruction of Jews was again given a high priority; that phase liquidated the remaining ghettos and camps.

Two factors contributed to the speed of the destruction of Lithuanian Jewry. The first was significant support for the "de-Jewification" of Lithuania from the Lithuanian population. The second was the German plan for early colonization of Lithuania – which shared a border with German East Prussia – in accordance with the Generalplan Ost; thus the high priority given to the extermination of the relatively small Lithuanian Jewish community.

=== Participation of local collaborators ===
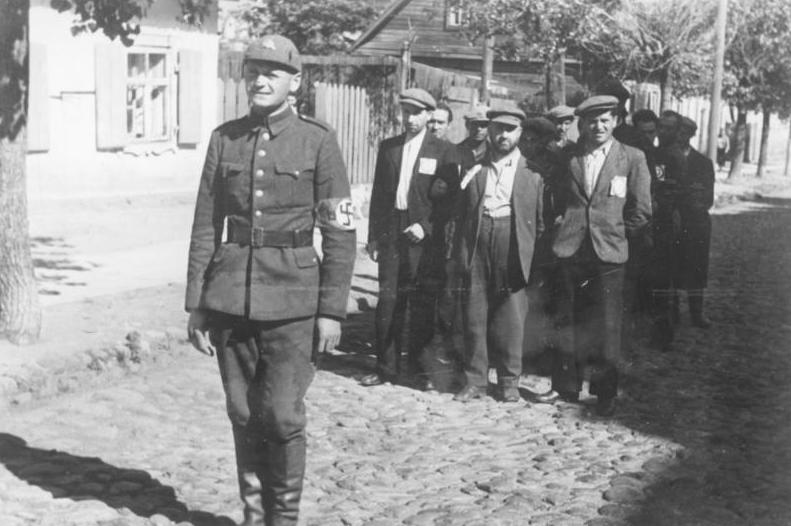
A member of the Lithuanian Security Police marching Jewish men through Vilnius, 1941

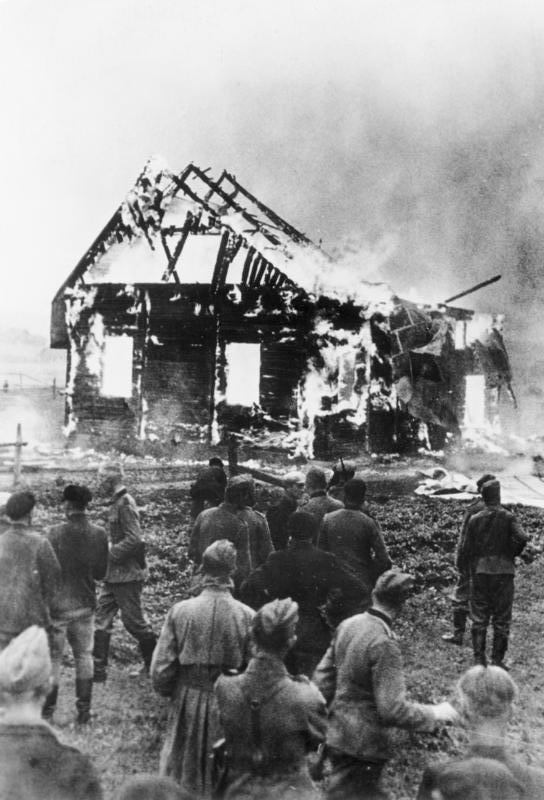
German soldiers and Lithuanians watch the burning of a synagogue, 9 July 1941

Dina Porat, the chief historian of Yad Vashem, writes that "The Lithuanians showed [the Einsatzgruppen] how to murder women and children, and perhaps made them accustomed to it...Indeed, at the onset of the invasion the German units killed mostly men, while the Lithuanians killed unselectively."

The Nazi German administration directed and supported the organized killing of Lithuanian Jews. Local Lithuanian auxiliaries of the Nazi occupation regime carried out logistics for the preparation and execution of the murders under Nazi direction. Nazi SS Brigadeführer Franz Walter Stahlecker arrived in Kaunas on 25 June 1941 and gave agitation speeches in the city to instigate the murder of Jews. Initially this was in the former State Security Department building, but officials there refused to take any action. Later, he gave speeches in the city. In an October 15 report, Stahlecker wrote that they had succeeded in covering up their vanguard unit (Vorkommando) actions, and made them look like initiatives of the local population. Groups of partisans, civil units of nationalist-rightist anti-Soviet affiliation, initiated contact with the Germans as soon as they entered the Lithuanian territories. A rogue unit of insurgents headed by Algirdas Klimaitis and encouraged by Germans from the Sicherheitspolizei and Sicherheitsdienst, started anti-Jewish pogroms in Kaunas (Kovno) on the night of 25–26 June 1941. Over a thousand Jews perished over the next few days in what was the first pogrom in Nazi-occupied Lithuania. Different sources give different figures, from 1,500 to 3,800, with additional victims in other towns of the region.

On 24 June 1941, the Lithuanian Security Police (Lietuvos saugumo policija), subordinate to Nazi Germany's Security Police and Nazi Germany's Criminal Police, was created. It would be involved in various actions against the Jews and other enemies of the Nazi regime. Nazi commanders filed reports lauding the "zeal" of the Lithuanian police battalions, surpassing their own. The most notorious Lithuanian unit participating in the Holocaust was the Ypatingasis būrys (a subdivision of German SD) from the Vilnius (Vilna, Wilno) area which killed tens of thousands of Jews, Poles and others in the Ponary massacre. Another Lithuanian organization involved in the Holocaust was the Lithuanian Labor Guard. Many Lithuanian supporters of the Nazi policies came from the fascist Iron Wolf organization. Overall, the nationalistic Lithuanian administration was interested in the liquidation of the Jews as perceived enemies and potential rivals of ethnic Lithuanians, and thus not only did not oppose Nazi Holocaust policy but in effect adopted it as their own.

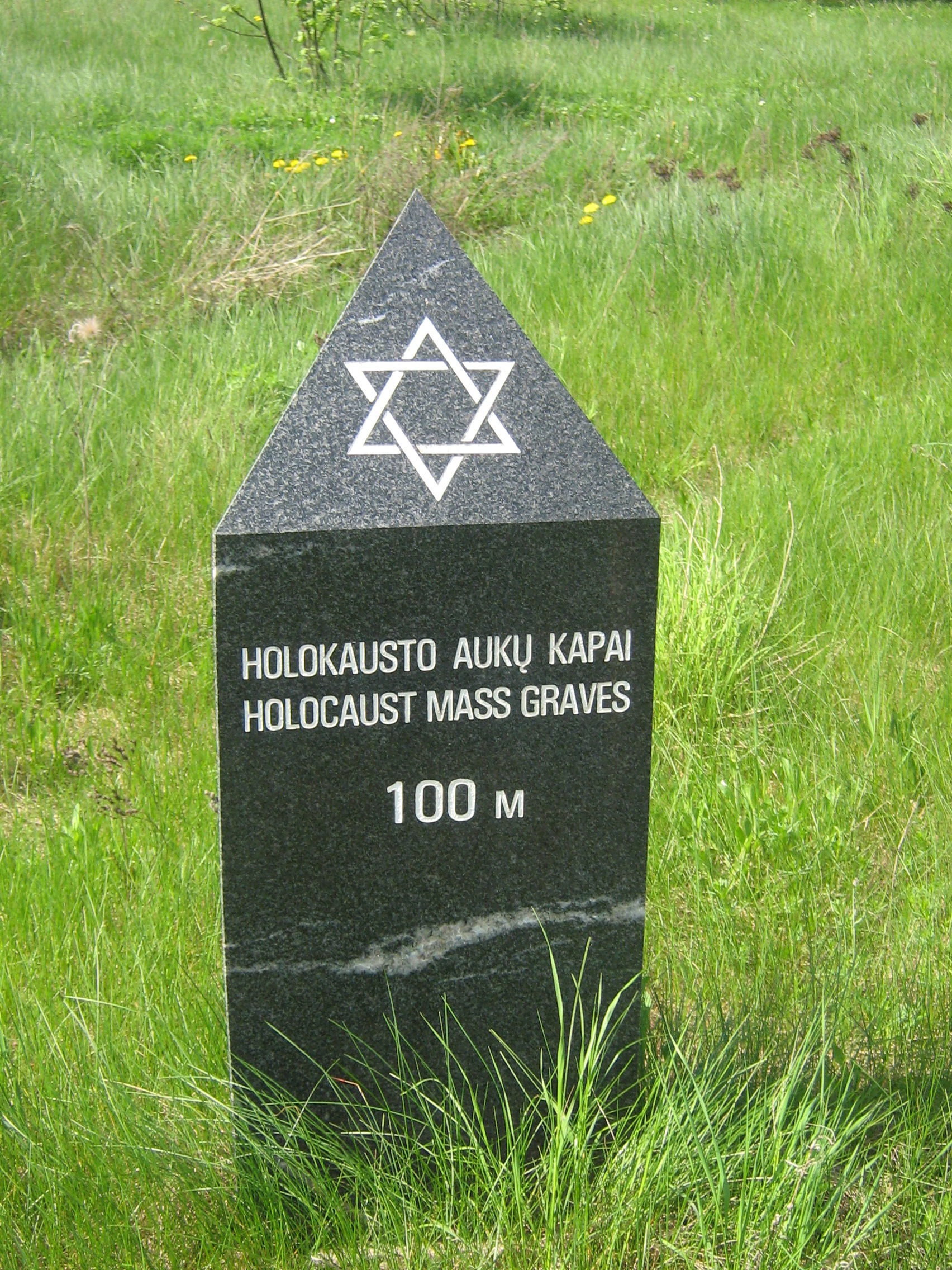
Holocaust mass graves near city of Jonava.

A combination of factors explains the participation of some Lithuanians in genocide against Jews. Those include national traditions and values, including antisemitism, common throughout contemporary Central Europe, and a more Lithuanian-specific desire for a "pure" Lithuanian nation-state with which the Jewish population was believed to be incompatible. There were a number of additional factors, such as severe economic problems which led to the killing of Jews over personal property. Finally the Jews were seen as having supported the Soviet regime in Lithuania during 1940–1941.^{[d]} During the period leading up to the German invasion, Jews were blamed by some for virtually every misfortune that had befallen Lithuania.

The involvement of the local population and institutions, in relatively high numbers, in the destruction of Lithuanian Jewry became a defining factor of the Holocaust in Lithuania.

Not all of the Lithuanian populace supported the killings, and many hundreds risked their lives sheltering the Jews. Israel has recognized 891 Lithuanians (as of January 1, 2017) as Righteous Among the Nations for risking their lives to save Jews during the Holocaust. In addition, many members of the Polish minority in Lithuania also helped to shelter Jews. Lithuanians and Poles who risked their lives saving Jews were persecuted and often executed by the Nazis.

== Comprehension and remembrance ==
Following the Holocaust, Lithuania became part of the USSR, whose government tried to minimize the unique suffering of the Jews. In Lithuania and throughout the Soviet Union, memorials did not mention Jews in particular; but instead were built to commemorate the suffering of "local inhabitants". However, people guilty of Nazi collaboration and crimes against Jews were often deported or executed.

Since Lithuania regained its independence from the Soviet Union in 1991, the debate over Lithuanian participation in the Holocaust has been fraught with difficulty. Modern Lithuanian nationalists stress anti-Soviet resistance, but some Lithuanian partisans, seen in Lithuania as heroes in the struggle against Soviet occupation, were also Nazi collaborators who cooperated in the murder of Lithuanian Jewry.

The genocide in Lithuania was one of the earliest large-scale implementations of the Final Solution, leading some to conclude that the Holocaust began in Lithuania in the summer of 1941. Other scholars say the Holocaust started in September 1939 with the onset of the Second World War, or even earlier, on Kristallnacht in 1938, or with Hitler's rise to power as Chancellor of Germany in 1933.

The post-Soviet Lithuanian government has on a number of occasions commemorated the Holocaust, made attempts to combat antisemitism, and brought some Nazi-era war criminals to justice. The National Coalition Supporting Soviet Jewry have said "Lithuania has made slow but significant progress in the prosecution of suspected Lithuanian collaborators in the Nazi genocide". Lithuania was the first of the newly independent post-Soviet states to enact legislation to protect and mark off Holocaust-related sites. In 1995, president of Lithuania Algirdas Brazauskas, speaking before the Israeli Knesset, offered a public apology to the Jewish people for Lithuanian participation in the Holocaust. On 20 September 2001, to mark the 60th anniversary of the Holocaust in Lithuania, the Seimas (Lithuanian parliament) held a session in which Alfonsas Eidintas, the historian nominated as the Republic's next ambassador to Israel, delivered an address about the annihilation of Lithuania's Jews.

=== Government Action Plan to Combat Antisemitism (2026) ===
In January 2026, the Government of Lithuania approved a comprehensive Action Plan to Combat Antisemitism, Xenophobia and Hate, a policy document containing 157 measures aimed at strengthening the prevention of and response to antisemitic and xenophobic incidents, hate speech and hate crimes, promoting equality and supporting minority communities. The plan was adopted following consultation with national ministries, municipalities, educational institutions and non-governmental organisations, and includes initiatives to expand public awareness, provide training for public officials and educators, and enhance education on Jewish history and Holocaust remembrance. Key objectives also encompass combating historical distortions and harmful stereotypes, improving institutional coordination against hate crime and supporting civic engagement in respect for human rights.

=== Controversy and criticism ===
Historically Lithuanians have denied national participation in the Holocaust or said that Lithuanian participants in the genocide were fringe or extreme elements. The memories and the discussion of those events in Jewish and Lithuanian historiographies differ considerably. Lithuanian historiography in the past two decades has improved, compared to Soviet historiography, and the work of scholars such as Alfonsas Eidintas, Valentinas Brandišauskas and Arūnas Bubnys, among others, have been positively reviewed by Western and Jewish historians. The issue remains controversial. Contentious issues include the role of the Lithuanian Activist Front, the Lithuanian Provisional Government and the participation of Lithuanian civilians and volunteers in the Holocaust.

Since the 1990s there has been criticism of the Lithuanian government's efforts to accurately depict the history of the Holocaust, the continued praise for Lithuanian nationalists who allegedly collaborated with the Nazis in murdering hundreds of thousands of Lithuanian Jews and the government's aversion to accepting culpability for the Holocaust in Lithuania. In the 2010s Lithuanian society was characterized by Holocaust dismissal and a surge in antisemitic sentiment.

In 2001 the Simon Wiesenthal Center criticized the Lithuanian government for its unwillingness to prosecute Lithuanians involved in the Holocaust. In 2002 the Center declared its dissatisfaction with the Lithuanian government's efforts and launched Operation Last Chance, offering monetary rewards for evidence leading to the prosecution of war criminals. This campaign has encountered much resistance in Lithuania and other former Soviet bloc countries. In 2008, the Center which had initially ranked Lithuania high during ongoing trials to bring Lithuanian war criminals to justice, noted in its annual report no progress and the lack of any real punishment from Lithuanian justice agencies for Holocaust perpetrators.

In January 2020 Lithuanian Prime Minister Saulius Skvernelis announced he would lead a committee to draft legislation declaring that neither Lithuania nor its leaders participated in the Holocaust. It is thought that the proposed law will likely be similar to the Polish Holocaust bill which makes it a crime to claim Poles or Polish authorities played any role in the Holocaust. In May 2020, on the 75th anniversary of end of World War II in Europe, the Lithuanian government sent its vice minister of foreign affairs, Povilas Poderskis, to accompany the German, Israeli and American ambassadors in attending a ceremony at the Lithuanian Jewish Cemetery in Vilnius.

==== Vilnius Street renaming and memorial controversy ====
In 2019 the issue gained national political attention when Vilnius' liberal Freedom Party mayor, Remigijus Šimašius, renamed a street that had been named after Kazys Skirpa and removed a memorial to Jonas Noreika, who ordered and oversaw the killings of Lithuanian Jews in Plungė during the Plungė massacre. The Lithuanian government-backed Genocide and Resistance Research Centre of Lithuania, which had previously been criticized for its whitewashing of the Holocaust, alleged that the plan to rename the streets was a plot by foreigners (mainly British and American). During the controversy Vytautas Landsbergis, Lithuania's first head of state after its independence from the Soviet Union, posted a poem on social media that referred to the Virgin Mary as a "žydelka" ("jew-girl") which was condemned by Faina Kukliansky, chair of the Jewish Community of Lithuania. Landsbergis said the poem was an attempt to show the ignorance of Lithuanian antisemites and requested support from "at least one smart and brave Jew ... who does not agree with Simasius." Lithuanian President Gitanas Nausėda subsequently proposed a law that would require municipalities to follow rules from the national government "when installing, removing or changing commemorative plaques" but later tabled the proposed law.

== See also ==
- Chiune Sugihara
- Collaboration during World War II
- History of the Jews in Lithuania
- Lithuanian Territorial Defense Force (1944)
- Lithuanian collaboration during World War II
- Timeline of Jewish history in Lithuania
- The Holocaust in Estonia
- The Holocaust in Latvia

== Notes ==
a While this article discusses the Holocaust on the Lithuanian territories, which primarily affected and resulted in the destruction of Lithuanian Jewry, tens of thousands of non-Lithuanian Jews also died on Lithuanian territories. This included primarily: 1) Polish Jews who sought refuge in Lithuania escaping the invasion of Poland in 1939 and 2) Jews from various Western countries shipped to extermination sites in Lithuania.

b Some scholars have noted that the German Final Solution and the Holocaust actually began in Lithuania.
Dina Porat: "The Final Solution – the systematic overall physical extermination of Jewish communities one after the other – began in Lithuania.
Konrad Kwiet: "Lithuanian Jews were among the first victims of the Holocaust [...] The Germans carried out the mass executions [...] signalling the beginning of the "Final Solution." See also, Konrad Kwiet, "The Onset of the Holocaust: The Massacres of Jews in Lithuania in June 1941." Annual lecture delivered as J. B. and Maurice Shapiro Senior Scholar-in-Residence at the United States Holocaust Memorial Museum on 4 December 1995. Published under the same title but expanded in Power, Conscience and Opposition: Essays in German History in Honour of John A Moses, ed. Andrew Bonnell et al. (New York: Peter Lang, 1996), pp. 107–21

c Three major ghettos in Lithuania were established: Vilnius ghetto (with a population of about 20,000), Kaunas Ghetto (17,500) and the Shavli Ghetto (5,000); there were also a number of smaller ghettos and labor camps.

d The propaganda line of Jewish Bolshevism was used intensively by Nazis in instigating antisemitic feelings among Lithuanians. It built upon the pre-invasion antisemitic propaganda of the anti-Soviet Lithuanian Activist Front which had seized upon the fact that more Jews than Lithuanians supported the Soviet regime. This had helped to create an entire mythos of Jewish culpability for the sufferings of Lithuania under the Soviet regime (and beyond). A LAF pamphlet read: "For the ideological maturation of the Lithuanian nation it is essential that anticommunist and anti-Jewish action be strengthened [...] It is very important that this opportunity be used to get rid of the Jews as well. We must create an atmosphere that is so stifling for the Jews that not a single Jew will think that he will have even the most minimal rights or possibility of life in the new Lithuania. Our goal is to drive out the Jews along with the Red Russians. [...] The hospitality extended to the Jews by Vytautas the Great is hereby revoked for all time because of their repeated betrayals of the Lithuanian nation to its oppressors." An extreme faction of the supporters of Augustinas Voldemaras, a group which also worked within the LAF, actually envisioned a racially exclusive "Aryan" Lithuanian state. With the start of German occupation, one of Kaunas' newspapers – Į Laisvę (Towards Freedom), commenced a spirited antisemitic crusade, reinforcing the identity of the Jew with communism in popular consciousness: "Jewry and Bolshevism are one, parts of an indivisible entity."
