= Chaim Yellin =

Lithuanian poet and resistance leader

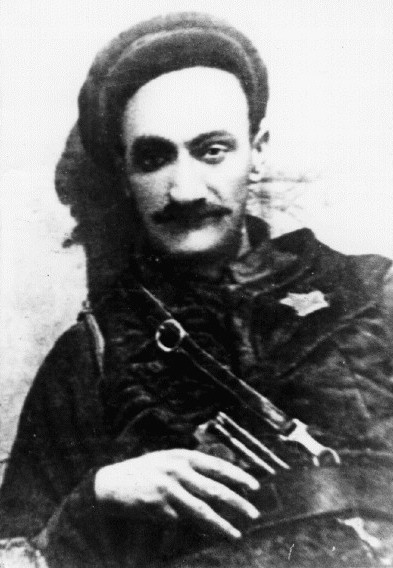
- Nickname: Kadishon
- Born: November 7, 1912; Vilkija, Lithuania
- Died: May, 1944 (Aged 31) Kovno Ghetto, Lithuania

Chaim Yellin (Hebrew: חיים ילין; Lithuanian: Chaimas Jelinas; 1912–1944) was a Jewish partisan leader of the resistance movement in the Kovno Ghetto during the German occupation of Lithuania during World War II.

== Biography ==
Chaim Yellin was born in the town of Vilkija to a Jewish family. His parents, Eliezer Yellin and Esther Rivel, spoke Hebrew, which was the language of instruction for Jews in the town at the time.

During World War I, Jews were expelled from areas close to the Eastern Front by order of the Chief of Staff of the Imperial Russian Army in 1915, and his family was pushed to Voronezh. There they witnessed the October Revolution and the Russian Civil War. As a result, his father changed his views considerably and Yiddish became spoken more in their home.

The family returned from Russia to Lithuania in 1921 and settled in Kaunas. Upon their return, his father founded a Jewish-general library in the city, which operated alongside the Kultur Lige.

Chaim Yellin was educated and grew up reading a lot, which led to him being known as "The Book" by his friends. During his school career, he had to adjust. In Voronezh he began his studies in Russian. In Kaunas, he moved to Yiddish, but because he was not in the fourth grade, he entered the Hebrew Gymnasium where he studied Hebrew until 1932. In addition, his studies at the Vytautas Magnus University in the Faculty of Economics was entirely in Lithuanian.

Yellin began publishing theater reviews about performances of Jewish groups in Kaunas. He moved from writing on these subjects gradually to reports and descriptions of street life and the market, town and village, and especially the difficult condition of the workers. He was one of the most active members of the left-wing young writers group, and was active in organizing literary and cultural evenings in the fields of literature, theater, music and poetry.

=== World War II ===
On June 24, 1941, a year after the Soviet occupation of Lithuania, Nazi Germany occupied Kaunas. Yellin and his family tried to escape into the Soviet Union, but were captured by the Germans. They wandered for a while on the roads and forests and eventually came back to Kaunas and were sent to the ghetto. While there, Yellin hid under the pseudonym "Kadishon" and disguised his appearance for fear of being captured by the Germans. By October, the Germans had carried out a number of massacres and deportation, and less than half of Kaunas' Jewish community was left, which previously numbered over 40,000.

Three underground resistance groups were known to have been active in the ghetto by the fall of 1941. Yellin was the commander of one of them, which dealt mainly with collecting information on the fronts, providing relief to veterans of the movement, and caring for the children of missing fighters.

In December 1941, the various groups merged into the "Anti-Fascist Struggle Organization." Although he had a lack of experience, Yellin was appointed commander of the organization. At the time of its establishment, the organization's goals were defined: "We shall not abandon the ghetto. Our major aim is the open struggle against the Nazis within partisan ranks." Members of the organization carried out many acts of sabotage, especially at work sites where Jews were sent to forced labor.

In 1943, after many efforts to establish ties, the members of the Anti-Fascist Organization joined the Lithuanian Underground "Union for the War against Fascism in Lithuania," and it was decided to cooperate closely. There were two attempts to establish a partisan base in the forests around Kaunas, but these both failed. In September 1943 Yellin went to Vilnius, following a letter he had received in the ghetto, in order to contact the parachutist, Gesia Glazer. In the meeting, Yellin received an invitation to one of the partisan bases in eastern Lithuania, and the two went to the Rūdninkai forest. At the base, Yellin spent two weeks in which he underwent rapid training.

=== Death ===
On April 6, 1944, Yellin was on a mission with a Lithuanian who was an undercover German agent. When the agent tried to stop Yellin, he figured out what was going on, pulled out a revolver and shot the agent. After hearing the commotion, German and Lithuanian soldiers ran after Yellin, and he eventually reached his friends house after jumping fences and running through alleys. After being spotted by the officers as he made it into the house, he shot at both of them again and ran in a different direction. Knowing he couldn't have gone far, Germans called in reinforcements. Since Yellin was out of ammunition, he tried to commit suicide before he could be captured. The Gestapo found him barely alive, and arrested him. Chaim Yellin was eventually executed after weeks of torture and refusing to give the Germans any information.

== Family ==
His brother, Meir Yellin (1910–2000) was a writer and engineer by profession. During the Nazi occupation he was imprisoned in the Kovno Ghetto, but eventually escaped and hid until the city was occupied by the Soviets. Upon the Soviet occupation of Kaunas, he became the founder of a shelter for Jewish children who survived the Holocaust. He published stories and articles in Lithuania, and later in the Soviet Jewish press about the Holocaust in Lithuania. Among his works: "Partisaner von Kunaser Gette" (in Yiddish: "Partisans in the Kovno Ghetto", Moscow, 1948); "One Night" (in Lithuanian and Russian, 1966); "In the Death Fortresses" (in Lithuanian, 1966).

With his wife, Dweira Yellin-Kormanaite, Meir Yellin had a daughter, Esther Yellin, born in 1940. Esther was a piano student in the legendary master class of Heinrich Neuhaus in Moscow. Today Esther Yellin works as a pianist and piano teacher for professional pianists in Zurich, Switzerland.

== See also ==
- George Kadish
- Holocaust in Lithuania
