= Trudi Birger =

German-born Israeli writer (1927 – 2002)

Trudi Birger (Hebrew: טרודי בירגר; 24 April 1927 – 24 April 2002) was a German-born, Israeli-nationalized writer, biologist, and Holocaust survivor. After the war Birger migrated to Israel, where she founded the Dental Volunteers for Israel clinic and published the book A Daughter's Gift of Love, detailing her experiences during the Holocaust.

== Biography ==
Birger grew up in Frankfurt, Germany, and she and her family went into hiding with the rise of Nazism when she was seven. They moved to Memel, East Prussia, in 1934. They were living in the Kovno Ghetto when she and her family were rounded up by the Nazis in 1944 and sent to the Stutthof concentration camp. She survived the war, marrying and immigrating to Israel with her family afterwards. In the 1960s, she became a microbiologist. She worked with children who had dental problems similar to those that she herself had suffered in the concentration camp after a Nazi guard knocked her teeth out.

In 1980, Birger founded the Dental Volunteers for Israel, a non-profit clinic in the Jerusalem neighborhood of Mekor Chaim, offering free treatment for needy children. She kept the dental clinic open for over two decades, fundraising from private contributions. In 1981 she was recognized with the Presidential Volunteer Award. In 1991 she was declared as a "Worthy Citizen of Jerusalem". In 1992 she published the book A Daughter's Gift of Love, detailing her experience during the Holocaust. In 2000 Birger was named as a Dental Fraternity Alpha Omega International honorary member.

== Personal life ==
She was married to Zev Birger, a Holocaust survivor from the Dachau concentration camp. He directed and presided over the Jerusalem International Book Fair for several years. They had three sons.
