= Sara Ginaite =

Jewish Lithuanian resistance fighter

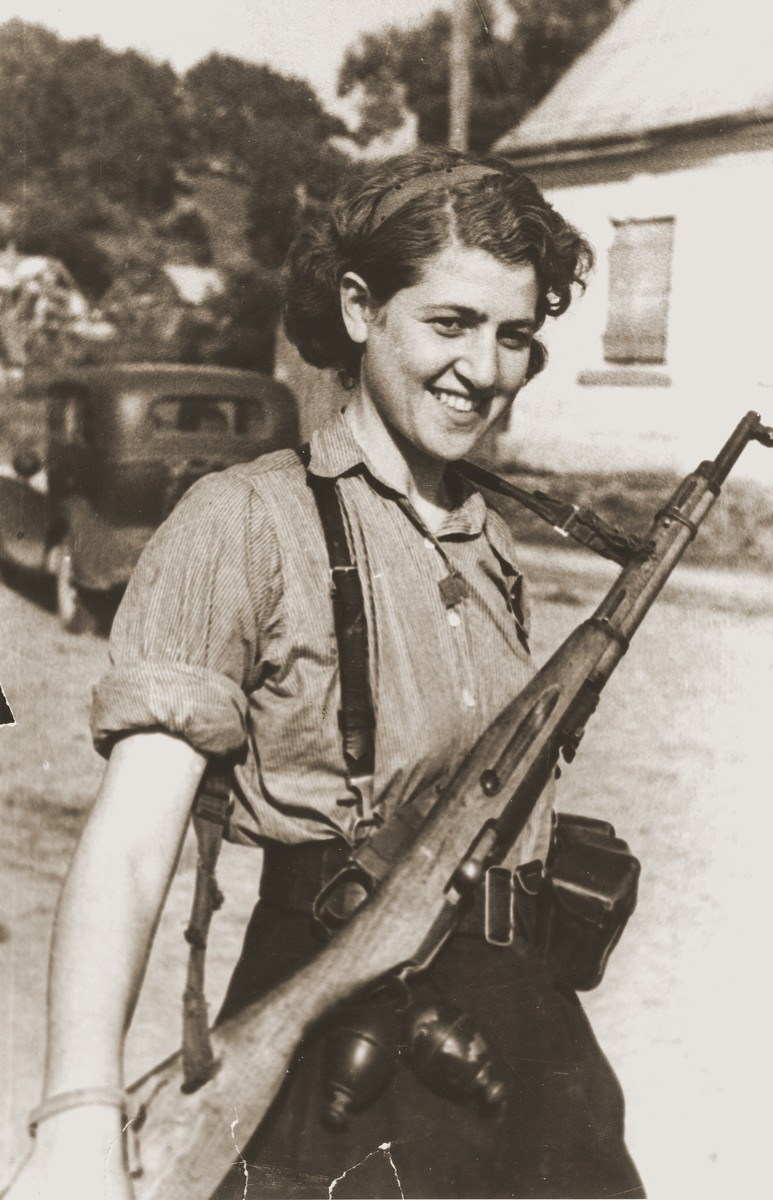
- Born: 17 March 1924
- Died: 2 April 2018 (aged 94)
- Occupations: writer; resistance fighter

Academic work
- Discipline: politics economics

Sara Ginaitė-Rubinson (17 March 1924 – 2 April 2018) was a Jewish Lithuanian-born Canadian author and academic. During the Second World War she was a resistance fighter during the Nazi occupation of Lithuania, becoming a Jewish partisan in 1942.

== Biography ==
Born in Kaunas on 17 March 1924, Ginaitė was brought up in an affluent family. Her father, Yosef Ginas, was an engineer who had graduated in France while her mother, Rebecca Virovitch, had matriculated from a Polish high-school. She was about to complete her secondary school education when Germany invaded Lithuania in 1941. After three of her uncles had been killed in the Kaunas pogrom, she was imprisoned with the surviving members of her family in the Kovno Ghetto. While there, she joined the Anti-Fascist Fighting Organization, a resistance group. Together with Misha Rubinson, whom she married, she escaped in the winter of 1943–44, establishing a partisan military unit "Death to the Occupiers". She twice returned to the ghetto helping others to escape. In 1944, she and her husband participated in the liberation of the ghettos in Vilnius and Kaunas although most of the Jews had been killed. From her own family, the only survivors were her sister and a niece.

She became a professor of political economics at Vilnius University. Her husband died in 1977 and in 1983 she moved to Canada, joining her two daughters Anya and Tanya. She became an adjunct professor at York University, and lectured in the U.S., Canada, Europe, and Israel on World War II history and social science. In 2013 she delivered a lecture entitled “History and Personal Memory: The Beginning of the Holocaust in Lithuania" at a University of Toronto symposium.

Ginaitė's award-winning book Resistance and Survival: The Jewish Community in Kaunas, 1941–1944 was translated into English and published in Toronto.

She died at her home on April 2, 2018 at the age of 94; her Yahrtzeit date is 17 Nissan.

== Publications ==
¨*Ginaite-Rubinson, Sara (2008). Resistance and Survival: The Jewish Community in Kaunas 1941–1944. Mosaic Press. ISBN 978-0889628168.

Many books by Ginaitė have also been published in Lithuanian.

== Awards ==
Her book Resistance and Survival: The Jewish Community in Kaunas, 1941–1944 won the Canadian Jewish Book Award for Holocaust History in 2006.
