= Abe Rich =

Israeli-American wood craftsman and Holocaust survivor

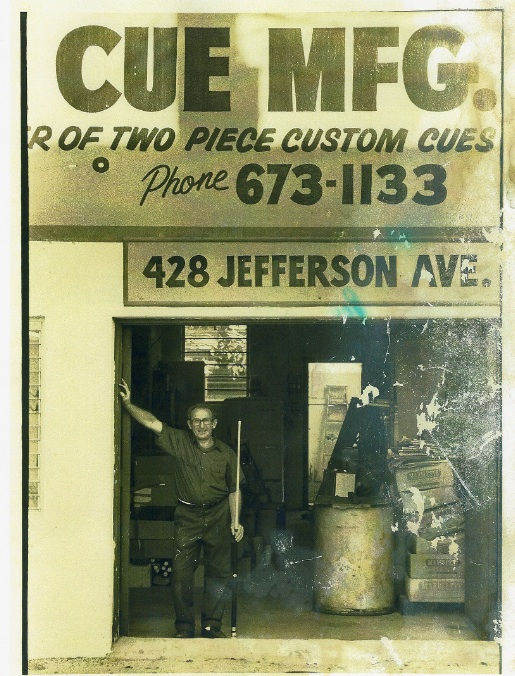
Rich in 1975.

Abe Rich (July 21, 1926 – November 25, 2008) was a Lithuanian-born Israeli-American wood craftsman and Holocaust survivor. He was inducted into the International Cuemakers Hall of Fame for the quality of the pool cue sticks he produced.

== The Holocaust ==
Abraham Rutzisky was the son of Chaim and Hodel Rutzisky (sometimes rendered as Rutzaisky), a woodworker in Lithuania. Chaim Rutzisky was a Spundturner, making bungs for beer kegs. A secular Jew, he was well-educated and spoke Lithuanian and Polish.

In World War II, Germany invaded Lithuania (earlier absorbed by the Soviet Union) on June 22, 1941. Rutzisky was recruited by partisans because of his non-Jewish appearance, education, and language skills; the partisans promised to help get his family to safety. He, however, was recognized, denounced as a Jew, and shot. His wife and his youngest son, two-year-old Shlomo, were also killed during the war.

His other sons, Morris and Abe, were assigned as woodturners in the workshops established in the Kovno Ghetto (July–October 1941). These were issued two of the 5,000 Jordan passes (Jordan-Scheine) given to "useful Jews" and named after the ghetto's S.A. Hauptsturmfuehrer, Fritz Jordan. The brothers were seen as valuable for their ability to make chess pieces and toys for the children of SS men.

One day, an SS officer came in to demand a repair or replacement of an ivory cigarette holder which had been a gift from his father. He struck Abe. Abe never recovered from this injury and became a hunchback, 5 foot 3 inch (1.6 m) tall as an adult. Having nearly starved to death, he suffered from chronic gastritis. Morris created a perfect replica of the cigarette holder out of cow bone. Impressed by the workmanship of the finished object, the officer declared, "Hitler lied." Until his transfer, this SS man smuggled food to the boys, which proved important to their survival.

The Kovno Ghetto was destroyed in October 1941, with 10,000 Jews being shot dead at the Ninth Fort on October 29. Approximately 3,000 of the 37,000 Jews living in Kovno survived the war, 500 of them by hiding in the forest, and 2,500 in German concentration camps.

The boys were sent to the Dachau concentration camp in Bavaria. Their woodworking skills again proved invaluable to their survival. They made clogs and canteens, and later internal scaffolding for the hangars the Germans erected to shield their aircraft from Allied reconnaissance and attack.

Survival was by the barest of margins: Morris weighed 68 pounds (31 kg) and Abe 61 pounds (28 kg) when they were liberated in April 1945. They were sent to the Benedictine St. Ottilien Archabbey in Landsberg to recuperate. Morris was an invaluable witness in the Dachau War Crimes trial because of his photographic memory and the length of time the brothers had spent in the ghetto. Morris personally identified the former commandant, Martin Gottfried Weiss, who was hanged on May 29, 1946.

By the time the proceedings ended, the window for Jewish refugees provided by the Truman Declaration had shut. Abe moved to Israel, where he worked in the Negev from 1948 to 1960 on road construction.

== Emigration to America ==
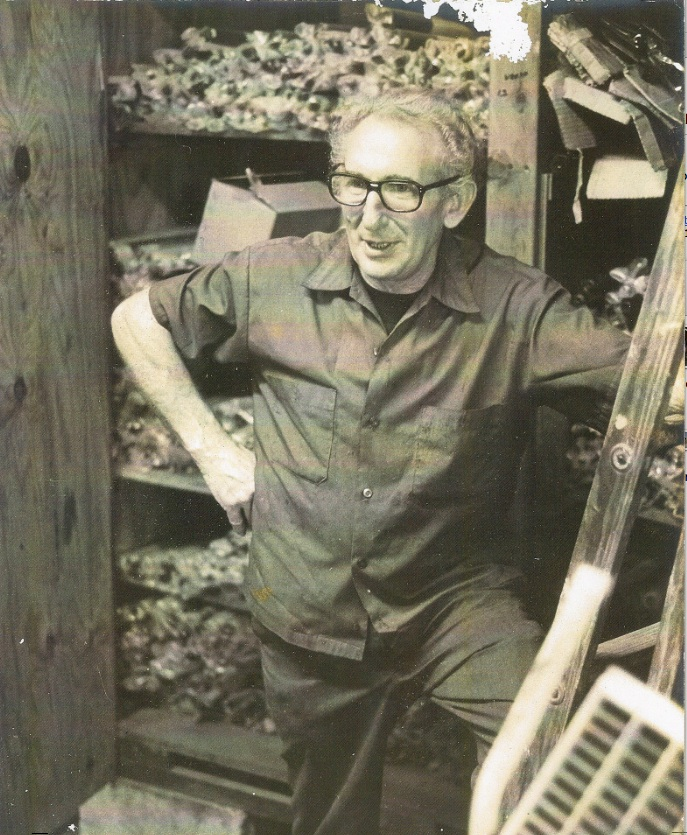
In the 60s with a treasure trove of wood

Shortening his surname to Rich, to match the usage of relatives already in the United States, he emigrated to the US in 1960, where he spent the remaining 46 years of his life (and never married). From 1962 to 1965, he worked for the Rich Q company, founded by his uncle Izzy's son Sol. The company was located first in Bowery, New York City, then later on Long Island.

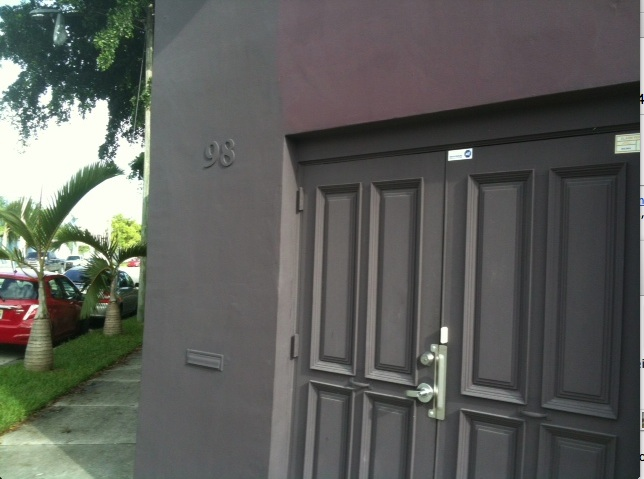
The 29th Street shop in 2011

Impressed with the apparent success of the enterprise, he interested his brother Morris in a similar venture. In 1965, they founded Florida Cues on 29th Street in Miami. The 4,000-square-foot (372 m^{2}) facility, including an 800-square-foot (74 m^{2}) showroom, was principally dedicated to Richwood Turning. Misunderstandings developed between the brother-partners, and in 1973 Abe started a new business, Star Cues.

Abe, having worked at Rich Cue for three years, produced many pool cues at Star which bear a familial resemblance to his cousin's output. He favored Merry Widow forearms, and Brazilian Rosewood was often used, although he was also fond of more exotic materials. He stored hundreds of blanks of Goncalo Alves, Kingwood, Canadian Maple, Zebrawood, and Macassar Ebony, which dried year after year under the tarpaper roof. Merry Widows formed the basis of his production, although Abe did a number of Titleist conversions. He was particularly fond of Delrin trim rings and Ivorine-3 ferrules, assembling his cues with his own, top secret epoxy blend.

Like his New York relatives, Abe did not lack for star customers at Star Cues; Rudolf "Minnesota Fats" Wanderone, Willie Mosconi, and Jackie Gleason (who played the original fictional Minnesota Fats in the 1961 film The Hustler) all bought cues from him.
