= Leyb Gorfinkel =

Lithuanian politician (1896–1976)

Leyb Gorfinkel

Leyb Gorfinkel (Hebrew: לייב גורפינקל; March 14, 1896 – September 7, 1976; also known as Leib Garfunkel and Levas Garfunkelis in Lithuanian) was an advocate, journalist, and politician. He was of Lithuanian and later of Israeli nationality.

== Early life and education ==
Leyb Gorfinkel grew up in Kovno (now Kaunas), which was then in the Russian Empire but which is currently in Lithuania. While he was attending Petrograd University (now Saint Petersburg State University), Gorfinel studied jurisprudence. For a time, he moved to Gomel, and moved back to Kovno at the end of 1918.

== Zionist activism ==
In Kovno, he participated in various Jewish and Zionist activities. In 1919, he helped organize the Zionist daily newspaper Di idishe shtime (The Jewish Voice), which he himself edited between February 1920 and February 1922. Gorfinkel was also a member of the presidium and then as vice chair of the Jewish National Council of Lithuania during this time. In addition, he edited the bi-weekly newspaper Unzer ruf (Our Call) in 1925-1926 and the weekly newspaper Di tsayt (The Times) in 1932. Gorfinkel was a member of the Lithuanian Seimas (Parliament) between 1923 and 1927, where he represented the Socialist Zionists and Tze'irei Zion. He was also a member of the Kovno City Council from 1924 onward.

== World War II and the Holocaust ==
He was an organizer of the Society to Aid Jewish Refugees from Poland in 1940; he was also arrested by the USSR in June of that same year. He was the vice chair of the Ältestenrat of the Kovno Ghetto between 1941 and 1944, which was when Nazi Germany was occupying Lithuania. Due to suspicion that he was engaging in "underground activity", Gorfinkel was arrested and tortured in April 1944. After the Kovno Ghetto was liquidated that same year, he was sent to Kaufering concentration camp, which was near Dachau.

== Later life and death ==
Gorfinkel lived in Rome, Italy between 1945 and 1948. In Rome, he was the head of the Organization of Jewish Refugees in Italy. He immigrated to Israel in 1948.

A week before his death, Gorfinkel was the first person to be interviewed by director Claude Lanzmann for his film Shoah, which was only released in 1985 (almost a decade after Gorfinkel's death). In this interview, Gorfinkel discussed his own experiences in the Kovno Ghetto during the Holocaust.

Gorfinkel died in 1976 at the age of eighty and was buried at Har HaMenuchot.

== Published works ==
- Žydų tautinė autonomija Lietuvoje [Jewish national autonomy in Lithuania]. Kaunas: Š. Neumano spaustuvė, 1920.
