= Jelgava massacres =

1941 killing of Jews in Jelgava, Latvia

- Location within Latvia
- Location: Jelgava, Latvia and vicinity 56°37′29″N 23°44′33″E
- Date: Second part of July or early August 1941
- Incident type: Mass shootings
- Perpetrators: Rudolf Batz, Rudolf Lange, Alfred Becu, Mārtiņš Vagulāns
- Participants: Wilhelm Adelt
- Organizations: Einsatzgruppen, Latvian Auxiliary Police, Vagulāns commando
- Victims: Separate estimates of 1,500, 1,550, and 2,000 victims have been made.
- Survivors: 21 survivors were transported to Ilūkste in August 1941
- Memorials: In the Jewish cemetery and in the forest where the killing occurred.

The Jelgava massacres were the killing of the Jewish population of the city of Jelgava, Latvia that occurred in the second half of July or in early August 1941. The murders were carried out by German police units under the command of Alfred Becu, with a significant contribution by Latvian auxiliary police organized by Mārtiņš Vagulāns.

== Background ==
Jelgava is a town in Latvia, about 50 kilometers south of Riga. Jelgava was once the capital of the Duchy of Kurland until that semi-independent state was taken over by the Russian empire in 1795. It is the principal city in the Latvian region of Zemgale, one of the four major regions of the country. The German name for Jelgava is Mitau. Jews began settling in Jelgava in the early 16th century, which was the start of the Jewish presence in Latvia. Many leaders of the Zionist movement came from Jelgava.

== German occupation ==
On Sunday 22 June 1941 the German armed forces attacked the USSR, including the Baltic states, which had recently been forcibly annexed to the Soviet Union. The Germans advanced quickly through Lithuania, entered Latvia, and captured Jelgava on 29 June 1941.

== Holocaust in Jelgava ==
The Nazi occupation regime planned to kill as many "undesirable" people as possible in the immediate wake of the invasion. "Undesirables" in the Baltic States included Communists, Gypsies, the mentally ill, and especially Jews. The murders were to be carried out by four units called "special assignment groups" which have become known by their German name as Einsatzgruppen. For the Baltic States the responsible unit was Einsatzgruppe A, initially under the command of Franz Walter Stahlecker. The Nazi organization which furnished most of the personnel for the Einsatzgruppen was the Security Service, (German: Sicherheitsdienst), generally referred to by its initials SD. Jelgava is located on the road between Šiauliai, Lithuania and the major city and capital of Latvia, Riga. When Einsatzgruppe A entered Latvia, its commander, Stahlecker, stopped at Jelgava shortly after its capture to organize a unit of Latvians to carry out the functions of the German SD and the Einsatzgruppen.

Part of the Nazi plan for the Jews in Latvia was to use propaganda, including the newspapers, to associate the Jews with the Communists and the NKVD, who had become hated in Latvia because of the Soviet occupation. In Jelgava, on 30 June 1941, Nacionālā Zamgale (National Zemgale) became the first newspaper issued in Latvia under Nazi control on 30 June 1941. Stahlecker, possibly by pre-arrangement, selected the Latvian agronomist and journalist Vagulāns to be both the editor of Nacionālā Zamgale and also the commander of the Latvian SD unit in Jelgava, which later became known as the Vagulāns commando. Carrying out the German wishes, the lead article in the first issue Nacionālā Zamgale praised Adolf Hitler and the German armed forces, and blamed the crimes during the Soviet occupation of Latvia on Jewish collaboration with the Communists. Similar anti-Semitic articles appeared in every issue of Nacionālā Zamgale. For example, the headline in the 3 July 1941 issue was "Free of Jewish Bolshevik Looters and Murderers." The manner and style of the condemnations were different from prewar Latvian anticommunism, and indicated the direct control of the Germans over the editorial process.

== Establishment of the German SD ==
As the front lines moved eastward, the Einsatzgruppen, who followed close behind the fighting, moved through Latvia in a few weeks. The German authorities then established "resident" SD offices in the major cities of Latvia, including Jelgava. The other offices were in Daugavpils, Liepāja, and Valmiera, with the main office in Riga. Under the Jelgava office, suboffices were set up in smaller towns in the vicinity, including Ilūkste, Jēkabpils, Bauska, and Tukums. A Nazi official named Egon Haensell was in charge of the Jelgava SD office.

== Vagulāns Kommando ==
Vagulāns had been a member of Pērkonkrusts, a Latvian ultranationalist and antisemitic organization in the 1930s. He claimed he had simply met Stahlecker on the highway to Riga, but Professor Ezergailis, questioned this, and stated that the possibility could not be ruled out that Vagulāns had been a pre-war SD agent in Latvia. The Germans remained in the background in Jelgava, and it was Vagulāns who organized the killings.

== Burning of the synagogues ==
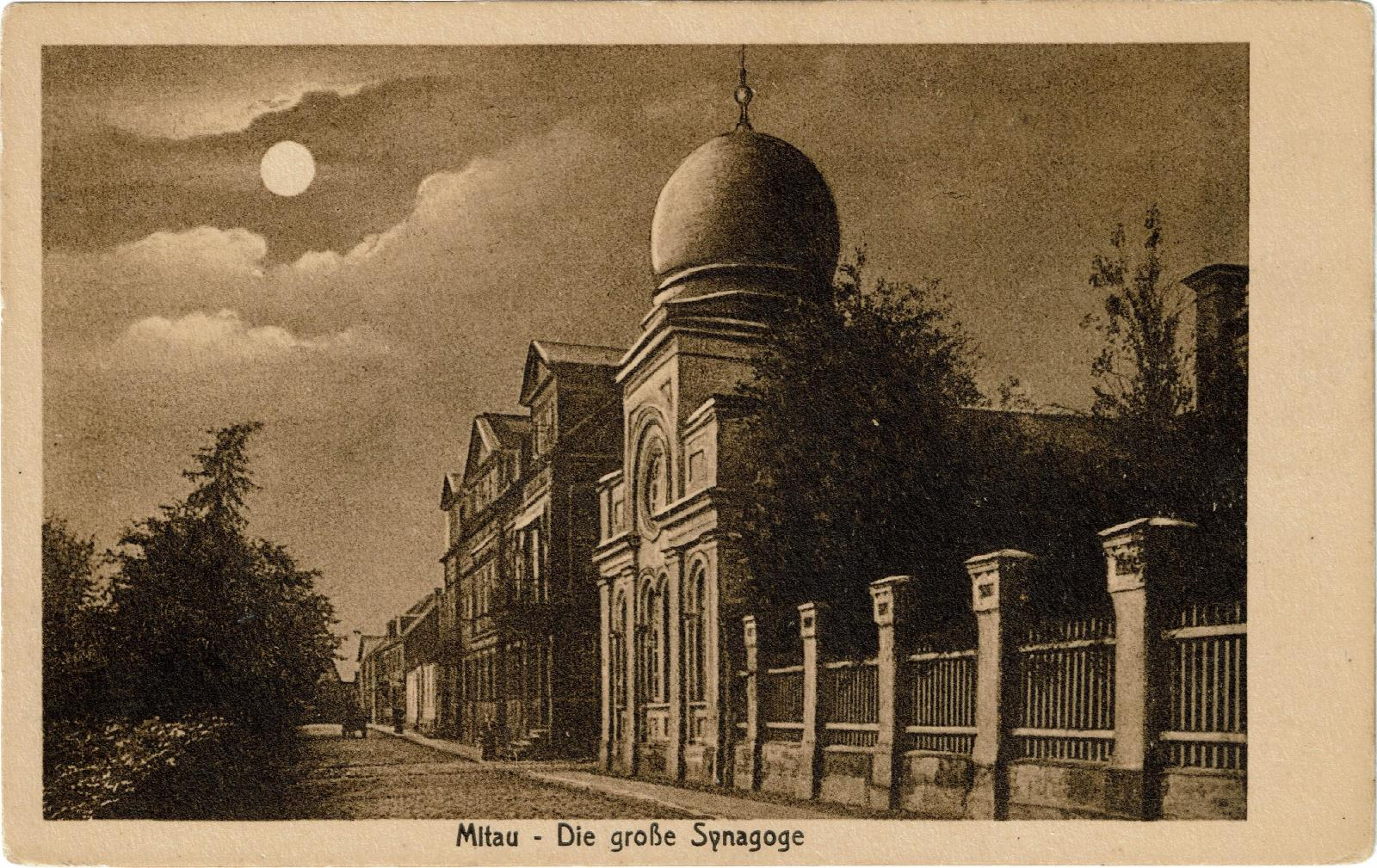
The New Synagogue of Jelgava in the 1910s

Two or three days after the Germans captured the city, the Great Synagogue of Jelgava was burned, apparently by Germans using hand grenades and gasoline. As the fire burned, the building was ringed by guards wearing German helmets. It was said in the city the next day that the rabbi refused to leave the synagogue, and perhaps other Jews were burned in the synagogue, or brutalized outside. Some Latvian onlookers of the burning expressed sympathy for the Jews, who were forced to march by and witness the burning house of worship.

== Individual murders and perpetrators ==
Max Kaufmann, a survivor of the Riga Ghetto states that there were a number of individual murders in Jelgava. According to Kaufmann, these included Dr. Lewitas, who was shot dead in the cemetery, the educator Bowshower who with his child was executed in the marketplace, and the Disencik and Hirschmann families who were forced to dig their own graves. Kaufmann states that according to his sources, participants in these murders, as well as the burning of the synagogue, included Hollstein and Colonel Schulz, both Baltic Germans who had returned to Latvia from Germany. Local Latvian perpetrators, also according to Kaufmann, included Weiland (Veilands), Petersilins (Pētersiliņš), Kaulins (Kauliņš), Leimand (Leimanis), and Dr. Sprogis (Sproģis).

== Identification and isolation of the Jews ==
From his office at 42 Lielā street (Lielā iela) in Jelgava, Vagulāns used his new newspaper, Nationālā Zamgale, to promulgate his decrees. On 30 June, among other things, he ordered all veterans of the police and the Aizsargi up to the time of the Soviet occupation to report to the Security Police office. He also forbade Jews to own, manage, or work in any food store. On 1 July 1941 he ordered all building managers to register the building occupants with the security police. This was the beginning of the identification of the Jews for murder, although it is unlikely that this was realized at the time by the managers. Older Jews at that time in Jelgava could be readily identified by their conservative dress, but the younger Jews were indistinguishable from the Latvians and spoke the Latvian language without an accent.

Vagulāns decreed that as of 3 July 1941 it would be illegal to sell anything to Jews, that the employment of all Jews was terminated, and those who lived in designated areas of the city were to vacate their residences by 18:00 hours on 5 July 1941. Where they went is not clear, some sources say they were housed in warehouses and old factories near the fish market, and others say they were housed near the railroad station. It appears that based by the small size of the authorized guard by 14 July the Jews were housed in a single large building. Their homes were looted by auxiliary police, or at least by people wearing armbands in colors of the Latvian flag (red-white-red) who were pretending to be part of the auxiliary police. Jews were not to enter theaters, cinemas, parks, museums or any other establishments or events. They were not to listen to the radio and all radios were to be surrendered to SD headquarters.8 At the same time these decrees were being published, the same newspaper, Nationālā Zamgale, was used by Vagulāns to publish anti-Semitic material which, in the opinion Ezergailis, was as bad or worse than the notorious German hate newspaper Der Stürmer.

== Massacre ==
The exact date of the murder of the Jelgava Jews cannot be precisely determined. It occurred either on the weekend of 25–26 July or 2–3 August, with evidence supporting both dates. Supporting a date of 2–3 August for the murders is a directive by Vagulāns published on 1 August 1941:

I order all Jews living in Jelgava city and district to leave the limits of the city and the district by 2 August at 12:00 noon. Those guilty of non-compliance shall be punished in accordance with the laws of war.

Aspects of the Jelgava massacre remain obscure. Whether there was one continuous shooting over the course of a weekend, or several smaller shootings remains unknown. The precise number of victims is not known; estimates of 1,500, 1550, and 2,000 have been proposed. The German SD man who conducted the shootings was Alfred Becu, who at his trial in 1968 in West Germany, said he was following the orders of the Latvian SD man Vagulāns. Becu also acknowledged that he'd been ordered by Rudolf Batz to take an Einsatzkommando detachment into Jelgava to kill the Jews. Becu testified that he was only in Jelgava a few days, left and had been in a state of shock ever since. The killing site seems to have been at a former shooting range of the Latvian army located about 2 kilometers south of Jelgava, near the highway that ran to Šiauliai in Lithuania.

According to a witness, Wilhelm Adelt, who commanded the perimeter guard at a three-day shooting, men, women and children, with the men predominating, were brought out to the shooting range, where on each day they were forced to dig a pit about 20 to 50 meters long and 2 meters deep. They were compelled to remove their outer clothing and surrender any valuables they were carrying. The victims were led to the pits by Latvian auxiliary policemen carrying rifles and wearing armbands. 8 to 10 Jews were killed at a time. The shooters were SD men, who used bolt-action rifles. Some shooters stood, and others knelt. The precise number of killers is not known. After being shot, some victims fell in the pit, others collapsed along the edge. Becu, who also gave the command to shoot, walked among the victims and shot again the still-living ones with his pistol. More victims were then brought up, shot, and pushed into the grave. When the pit was full, Latvians covered it up with sand. On each day of the killing, the victims would first be forced to dig a new pit and the process would continue. According to Adelt, Becu said "'the Jews had to be killed because they did not fit into the Nazi regime, and that Jews in general would be rooted out.'" The method described by Adelt was similar to the many killings committed by Einsatzkommando 2 in the Biķernieki forest. Adelt testified that about 500 to 600 people were killed in the three-day massacre. Professor Ezergailis states that if this was the single major massacre, the total must have been three times as high.

== Survivor accounts ==
There appear to be no survivor accounts of the Jelgava mass shootings. An account is provided by Frida Michelson, a women's clothing designer from Riga who was working in a forced labor detail in the field near Jelgava:

Once a different guard, armed with an automatic gun, rode by on a bicycle. When he saw us -- Jewish women -- working, he became hysterical. "Who dared bring those damn Jewesses here? They'll contaminate everything they touch!" He pointed the automatic weapon in our direction. "Who is in charge here?" "I am," our guard said, and ran to him waving a paper. "They are performing useful work here by order of the Riga Commandature." They exchanged a few angry words and the stranger rode away. Later the farm woman told us that if our guard had not the paper declaring his responsibility for us, we would all have been shot by the stranger, right there in the field.

== Results and aftermath ==
Virtually the entire Jewish community of Jelgava was killed during the massacres and the other persecutions. Afterwards, the Nazis posted signs at the entrance to the town which said "Jelgava is cleansed of Jews" (judenrein). Police Battalion 105 was a Nazi organization assigned to the Baltic states with the task of killing Jews, Gypsies, and others. On July 20, 1941, a salesman from Bremen who had enlisted in Police Battalion 105 wrote to his wife from Jelgava, complaining that there were no more Jews left in the city to act as domestic servants, and added, possibly sarcastically, "They must be working, I suppose, in the countryside."

In July 1941 Latvia and the other Baltic States were incorporated with Belarus (then known as White Russia or White Ruthenia) into a German occupation province called Ostland. Over Ostland the Nazis installed Hinrich Lohse with the title of National (or Reich) Commissioner (Reichskommissar). Under Lohse, Latvia itself was governed by Otto-Heinrich Drechsler with the title of Commissioner General (Generalkommissar). Latvia was broken up into six areas, of which Jelgava was one, with each area under the control of a Territorial Commissioner (Gebietskommissar). For the Jelgava territory, Freiherr Walter von Medem was appointed Gebietskommissar. Browning and Matthaüs report in their book that

In a report written in mid-August, the Gebietskommissar (county commissioner) in Mitau (Jelgava) defined it as one of his main tasks to establish discipline among the local policemen, who, as a result of their involvement in the liquidation of the Jewish population, had lost all moral restraints. He took it as a sign of success that his "to bring the surviving 21 Jews from Mitau alive to Illuxt" had been carried out despite the considerable distance between the two cities.

In 1942, the Nazis removed and sold all the tombstones in the Jewish cemetery and leveled the site. Jelgava itself was mostly destroyed in later fighting in World War II.

== Memorials ==
Memorials have been constructed in the Jewish cemetery and in the forest near the city where the Jews were killed.
