= Zev Birger =

Lithuanian-born Israeli activist and bureaucrat (1926 – 2011)

Zev Birger (Hebrew: זאב בירגר; June 1, 1926 – June 6, 2011) was a founder of the Sons of Zion Organization that worked to preserve Hebrew culture and language during World War II. He was also active in Aliyah Bet (illegal immigration organization) that organized the immigration of Holocaust survivors to Israel. He help set up of State of Israel's Customs and Excise Department, served as Deputy Minister of Commerce and Industry, as a special assistant to Jerusalem Mayor Teddy Kollek for the development of culture, the economy and tourism in the city, and directed the Jerusalem International Book Fair. Among those who nurtured Israeli cinema, he was a founder of Sam Spiegel Film & Television School.

== Biography ==
Zev Birger was born in Kovno (Kaunas), Lithuania, to Feiga Tzippora née Kaplan and Pinchas Birger. Feiga and Pinchas Birger had a solidly Zionist worldview and a strong belief in the need to establish a national home for the Jewish people in the Land of Israel, and passed these views on to their children.

When Zev was ten, World War II began but it had only a marginal effect on Lithuania until September 1940, when Lithuania was annexed to the Soviet Union. When the Soviets invaded, the activities of Zionist organizations were banned. At first, many people, including Zev's parents, thought the Soviets would be better than the Germans, but the Soviets immediately began to confiscate property and persecute the Lithuanian bourgeoisie, including many Jews.

In mid-June 1941, the German invasion of the Soviet Union began, and it took only one week for all of Lithuania to fall into their hands. In July, they began to gather all of the Jews into a ghetto in Slobodka, a suburb of Kovno. Like many other Jews, the Birger family left almost all of their possessions behind, and moved into a small room in the ghetto. Periodically, there was an "aktion" or round-up in which groups of Jews were chosen randomly and sent to be executed.

At the beginning of the war, in 1940, Zev Birger was among the founders of the Sons of Zion Organization that undertook the Zionist education of Jewish teens and struggled to preserve Hebrew culture and language, which had been outlawed by the Soviet authorities. The movement published a journal, Nitzotz ("Spark"). Birger was partner in publication of the hand-written journal that was distributed in the Lithuanian underground, in the ghetto and even in the camps, where five issues were circulated, handwritten by the editor Shlomo Frankel, prior to liberation. The Sons of Zion also built bunkers where food and water were stockpiled.

On July 8, 1944, it was decided to evacuate all residents of the ghetto. Zev and his family tried to avoid evacuation by hiding in a bunker. For five days they succeeded, but on July 13, the Germans found them. Together with another 300 Jews who had remained in the ghetto, they were marched to the railroad station. On the way, there a selection, and Feiga Birger, Zev's mother, was sent to the left with the elderly and sick. That was the last time he saw her. Zev, his brother Mordecai and his father were loaded onto a freight train headed for Germany. Zev later said that he and his brother had several opportunities to jump from the car but they did not want to leave their father.

The Birgers were taken to Stutthof, and transferred to Dachau only a few days later. From there, they were taken to Kaufering IV, where they were forced to work in an underground German munitions factory that produced airplanes.

Within a short time Zev remained alone, after his father died in his arms, of a serious infection, and his brother was sent to another work camp, where he died. Zev was transferred to Kaufering V and then to Kaufering VII, which were even worse. Throughout it all, he repeated to himself: "You will survive. This will be our revenge."

On April 27, 1945, the camp was liberated by American soldiers and Zev was transferred to the hospital in Bad Woerishofen. His physical condition was very poor, but the doctors were able to save his life and heal his abscess-covered body. The Americans identified his abilities, and Zev became their translator. They equipped him with a US army uniform and attached him to the unit. Although the unit's commander implored him to return with his soldiers to the United States and receive US citizenship, Zev was convinced that his place was in Israel, as part of the effort to build a state for the Jewish people, so that similar events would not occur again in the future.

Zev parted from his American saviors, and went to Frankfurt where he joined the illegal immigration operation that brought Holocaust survivors to the Land of Israel. There, he met Trudi née Simon, and they married in July 1946. On November 20, 1947, the young couple disembarked on the coast of Haifa, together with Trudi's mother.

At the beginning of the War of Independence, Zev was drafted to the nascent Israeli army. After his discharge, the Birgers lived in Haifa and Zev was a founder of the Customs and Excise Department, and helped shape the young State's tax system. In the 1960s, Birger was given responsibility for moving the Customs Office to Jerusalem, and also moved, with his family, to the capital.

In 1967, Birger joined the Industry, Trade and Labor Ministry as Deputy Minister and charged with reorganizing the ministry. He divided it into professional divisions, based on the ministry's areas of responsibility, and established the Light Industries Division. He identified the relative advantage of Israel's human capital for culture and creativity, and therefore set new goals for promoting publishing, design and electronic (later, hi-tech). In this position, did much to promote Israeli cinema, establishing the Israel Film Center and helping to found Sam Spiegel Film and Television School in Jerusalem.

After his retirement from the civil service in 1977, Zev Birger managed the Paris office of world's largest arts management firm, ICM.

In 1980, Birger helped his wife Trudi Birger establish a free dental clinic for poor children in Jerusalem - Dental Volunteers for Israel, which continues to provide care for thousands of at-risk children and youth every year, thanks to volunteer dentists from around the world. Trudi and Zev's sons Doron, Oded and Gili Birger serve on DVI's Board of Directors today.

In 1982, Teddy Kollek, then mayor of Jerusalem, asked Birger to help develop industry and tourism in Jerusalem. He considered this an opportunity to make Jerusalem into an international meeting place, a venue for cultural dialogue that would pave the way for tolerance and peace. As a result of this perspective, the Jerusalem International Book Fair, which Birger managed, became one of the most important international book fairs in the world, a prestigious and respected institution where authors, editors and publishers from around the world meet. Birger managed the book fair until his last day.

In 1999, William Morrow published an English version of Zev Birger's memoir, No Time for Patience: My Road from Kaunas to Jerusalem. The book was translated into several languages and published in six countries.

In 2000, the Jerusalem Municipality honored Zev Birger as a Yakir Yerushalayim ("Worthy Citizen of Jerusalem") in recognition of the many years he worked to promote culture, the economy and tourism in Jerusalem. He was also honored by the governments of Germany and Lithuania.

In his eulogy, the British author Ian McEwan, who was awarded the prestigious Jerusalem Prize in 2011, said: "He saw how low humanity could sink, and then he rose and gave so much. He was an indestructible spirit and an example to all mankind. Not only Jerusalem or Israel but the whole world that loves culture and friendship will feel this loss keenly." Similarly, the Japanese author Haruki Murakami, who was awarded the prestigious prize in 2009, wrote: "I heard the tragic news of Zev's death. I was so surprised and shocked. I have a beautiful memory of him, and am missing him truly." President Shimon Peres also eulogized Birger and wrote: "Only someone like Zev could have brought authors with international reputations to Jerusalem and make it into a literary capital."

== Death ==
In June 2011, he died after being hospitalized in coma for ten days, as result of a head injury sustained in a traffic accident in Jerusalem. He is survived by the three sons, Doron, Oded and Gil, and eleven grandchildren.

== See also ==
- Sam Spiegel Film & Television School
