= George Kadish =

Lithuanian-born photographer and Holocaust survivor (1910–1997)

George Kadish, born Zvi (Hirsh) Kadushin (1910 – September 1997), was a Lithuanian Jewish photographer who documented life in the Kovno Ghetto during the Holocaust, the period of the Nazi German genocide against Jews.

Prior to World War II he was a mathematics, science and electronics teacher at a Hebrew High School in Kovno, Lithuania.

As a hobby, Kadish was a photographer. He was skilled at making home-made cameras. During the period of Nazi control of Lithuania (along with indigenous Lithuanian collaborators) he successfully photographed various scenes of life and its difficulties in the ghetto in clandestine circumstances. Kadish constructed cameras by which he could photograph through the buttonhole of his coat or over a window sill. He was able to photograph sensitive scenes that would attract the ire of Nazis or collaborators, such as scenes of people gathered for forced labor, burning of the ghetto, and deportations.

His photographs were featured in a 2003 exhibition at the YIVO Institute in New York.

== Bibliography ==
- Kadish, George, et al. Days of Remembrance, 1987: Family Life in the Kovno Ghetto. San Francisco, CA: Mellen Research University Press, 1991. Book is catalog of his work, as displayed in 1987 at the Russell Senate Office Building.

"George's Kaddish for Kovno and the Six Million." Catherine Gong, edited by Michael Berenbaum. 2009. Also located at Stanford University (Cecil H. Green), United States Holocaust Memorial Museum Archive, and Tom Lantos Foundation for Human Rights.

See also, http://catherinegong.com/georges-kaddish-for-kovno-and-the-six-million/
