= Franz Walter Stahlecker =

German SS officer and Holocaust perpetrator (1900–1942)

Walter Stahlecker
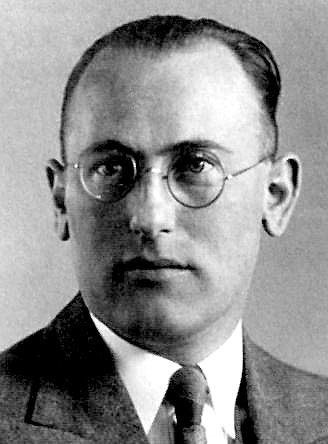
- Born: 10 October 1900; Sternenfels, German Empire
- Died: 23 March 1942 (aged 41); Gatchina, RSFSR, Soviet Union
- Military career
- Allegiance: German Empire; Nazi Germany
- Branch: Schutzstaffel
- Service years: 1918; 1933–1942
- Rank: SS-Brigadeführer
- Commands: Einsatzgruppe A Commander, Security Police and SD for Reichskommissariat Ostland

Franz Walter Stahlecker (10 October 1900 – 23 March 1942) was commander of the SS security forces, the Sicherheitspolizei (SiPo) and the Sicherheitsdienst (SD), for the Reichskommissariat Ostland in 1941–42. Stahlecker commanded Einsatzgruppe A, the most murderous of the four Einsatzgruppen (death squads during the Holocaust) active in German-occupied Eastern Europe. He was fatally wounded in action by Soviet partisans and was replaced by Heinz Jost.

== Early life ==
Stahlecker was born into a wealthy family in Sternenfels, Germany on 10 October 1900. He was the second of three sons of the pastor and director of studies Eugen Stahlecker and his wife Anna Zaiser. He served in the military from 21 September to 7 December 1918. From 1919 to 1920 Stahlecker was a member of the Deutschvölkischer Schutz und Trutzbund and the Organisation Consul. He studied at the University of Tübingen, where he obtained a doctorate of law in 1927. On 14 October 1932, he married Luise-Gabriele Freiin von Gültlingen; their marriage produced four children.

== Early Nazi career ==
On 1 May 1932, Stahlecker joined the Nazi Party (no. 3,219,015) as well as the Schutzstaffel (SS no. 73,041). On 29 May 1933, he was appointed deputy director of the Political Office of the Württemberg State Police. In 1934, he was appointed head of the Gestapo in the German state of Württemberg and soon assigned to the main office of the Sicherheitsdienst (SD). On 11 May 1937, he became head of the Gestapo in Breslau. After the annexation of Austria in 1938, Stahlecker became SD chief of the Danube district (Vienna), a post he retained even after being promoted to SS-Standartenführer. In the summer of 1938, Stahlecker became Inspekteur der Sicherheitspolizei und des SD (IdS) in Austria, succeeding Gestapo chief Heinrich Müller in that position. As of 20 August 1938, Stahlecker was the formal head of the Central Agency for Jewish Emigration in Vienna, though its de facto leader was Adolf Eichmann. Differences of opinion with Reinhard Heydrich motivated Stahlecker to move to the Auswärtiges Amt (Foreign Office), after which he held posts as the commander of the Security Police and SD (Befehlshaber der Sicherheitspolizei und des SD, BdS) in the Protectorate of Bohemia and Moravia under SS-Brigadeführer Karl Hermann Frank. In mid-October 1939, Eichmann and Stahlecker decided to begin implementation of the Nisko Plan.

On 29 April 1940, Stahlecker arrived in Oslo, Norway, where he held various posts, most notably as BdS, commanding about 200 Einsatzgruppe members of the Security Police and SD. He was promoted to SS-Oberführer. He was succeeded in this position in autumn 1940 by Heinrich Fehlis.

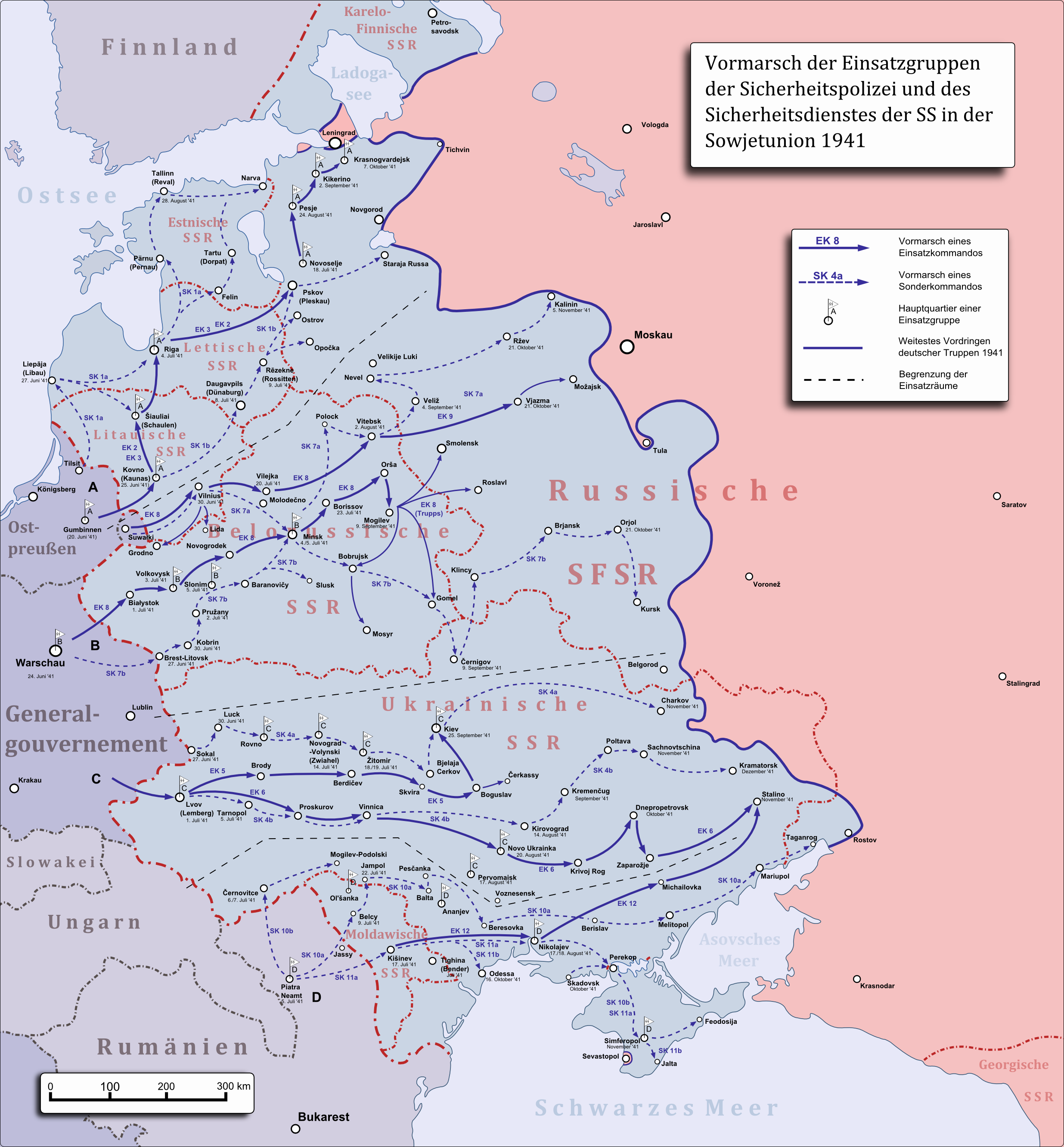
Map of the Einsatzgruppen in the USSR 1941

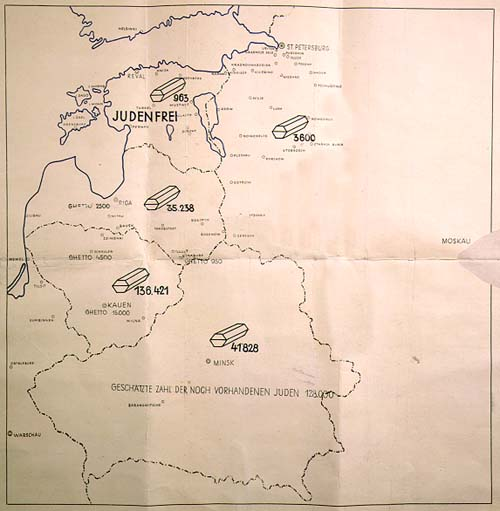
Annotated map from the report sent by Stahlecker report to Heydrich January 31, 1942; summarizes 220,250 murders committed by Einsatzgruppe A under his command by October 1941; Estonia is marked as "JudenFrei" {Free of Jews}

== Einsatzgruppe A ==
On 6 February 1941 Stahlecker was promoted to SS-Brigadeführer and Generalmajor der Polizei and took over as commanding officer of Einsatzgruppe A, in hopes of furthering his career with the Reich Security Main Office (RSHA), Nazi Germany's security police and intelligence organization. In June 1941, Einsatzgruppe A followed Army Group North and operated in Lithuania, Latvia, Estonia and areas of Russia up to Leningrad. Its mission was to hunt down and murder the Jews, Gypsies, Communists, and other "undesirables". In a 15 October 1941 report, Stahlecker wrote:

Considering that the population of the Baltic countries had suffered very heavily under the government of Bolshevism and Jewry while they were incorporated in the USSR, it was to be expected that after the liberation from that foreign government, they would render harmless most of the enemies left behind after the retreat of the Red Army. It was the duty of the Security Police to set in motion these self-cleansing movements, and to direct them into the correct channels in order to accomplish the purpose of the cleansing operations as quickly as possible. It was no less important, in view of the future, to establish the unshakeable and provable fact that the liberated populations themselves took the most severe measures against the Bolshevist and Jewish enemy quite on their own, so that the direction by German authorities could not be found out. In Lithuania this was achieved for the first time by Partisan activities in Kowno. To our surprise it was not easy at first to set in motion an extensive pogrom against Jews. Klimatis, the leader of the partisan unit mentioned above, who was used for this purpose primarily, succeeded in starting a pogrom on the basis of advice given to him by a small advance detachment acting in Kowno, and in such a way that no German order or German instigation was noticed from the outside. During the first pogrom on the night of 25-26 [June], the Lithuanian partisans did away with more than 1,500 Jews, set fire to several Synagogues or destroyed them by other means, and burned down a Jewish dwelling district consisting of about 60 houses. During the following nights about 2,300 Jews were made harmless in a similar way.

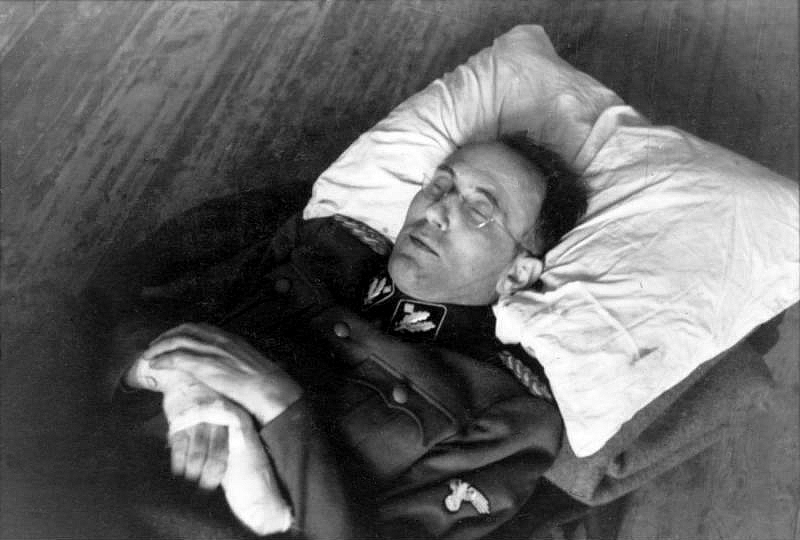
Stahlecker lies wounded (1941).

By winter 1941, Stahlecker reported to the German government that Einsatzgruppe A had murdered some 249,420 Jews. He was made Commander of the Security Police and the SD (Befehlshaber der Sicherheitspolizei und des SD) of Reichskommissariat Ostland, which included the occupied territory of Estonia, Latvia, Lithuania and Belarus, at the end of November 1941. Stahlecker was fatally wounded in action on 22 March 1942, by Soviet partisans near Krasnogvardeysk, Russia. Heinz Jost then assumed command of Einsatzgruppe A and of the Security Police and SD.

== See also ==
- Jelgava massacres
- Kaunas pogrom

== Bibliography ==
- Hale, Christopher (2011). Hitler's Foreign Executioners: Europe's Dirty Secret. The History Press. ISBN 978-0-7524-5974-5. Archived from the original on 2020-10-23.
- Gerwarth, Robert (2011). Hitler's Hangman: The Life of Heydrich. New Haven, CT: Yale University Press. ISBN 978-0-300-11575-8.
- Longerich, Peter (2012). Heinrich Himmler: A Life. Oxford; New York: Oxford University Press. ISBN 978-0-19-959232-6.
