= Algirdas Klimaitis =

Lithuanian Holocaust perpetrator

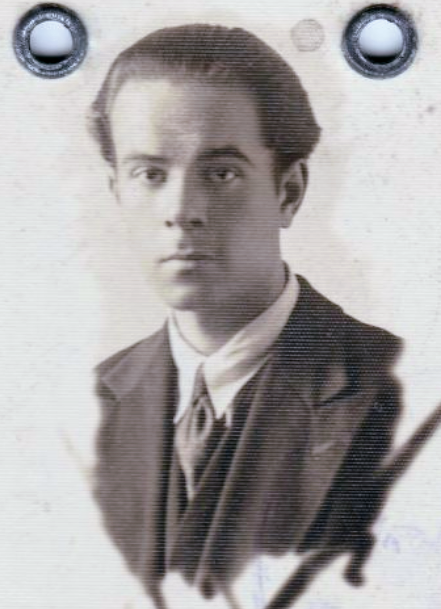
- Algirdas Jonas Klimaitis, August 1932
- Born: December 28, 1913; Kovno, Russian Empire
- Died: August 29, 1988 (aged 74); Hamburg, West Germany
- Occupations: Journalist, Lithuanian paramilitary commander
- Parent: Pranas Klimaitis (father)

Algirdas Jonas Klimaitis (Note: In non-Lithuanian texts, he is sometimes incorrectly referred to as Jonas Klimaitis. Stahlecker's report did not supply his first name.) (28 December 1913 – 29 August 1988) was a Lithuanian paramilitary commander who was infamous for his role in the Kaunas pogrom in June 1941 during World War II.

During the interwar years, Klimaitis worked as a journalist for Lithuanian newspapers. Before the Second World War, he was the editor of the tabloid Dešimt centų (Ten Cents). His attitudes shifted to anti-communism and antisemitism. He joined the Voldemarininkai movement.

When Nazi Germany occupied Lithuania in June 1941, at the start of Operation Barbarossa, Klimaitis formed a military unit of roughly 600 members, which was not subordinate to the Lithuanian Activist Front or the Provisional Government of Lithuania, and engaged in firefights with the Soviet army for control of Kaunas. On the evening of 23 June, most of the city was in the hands of the insurgents.

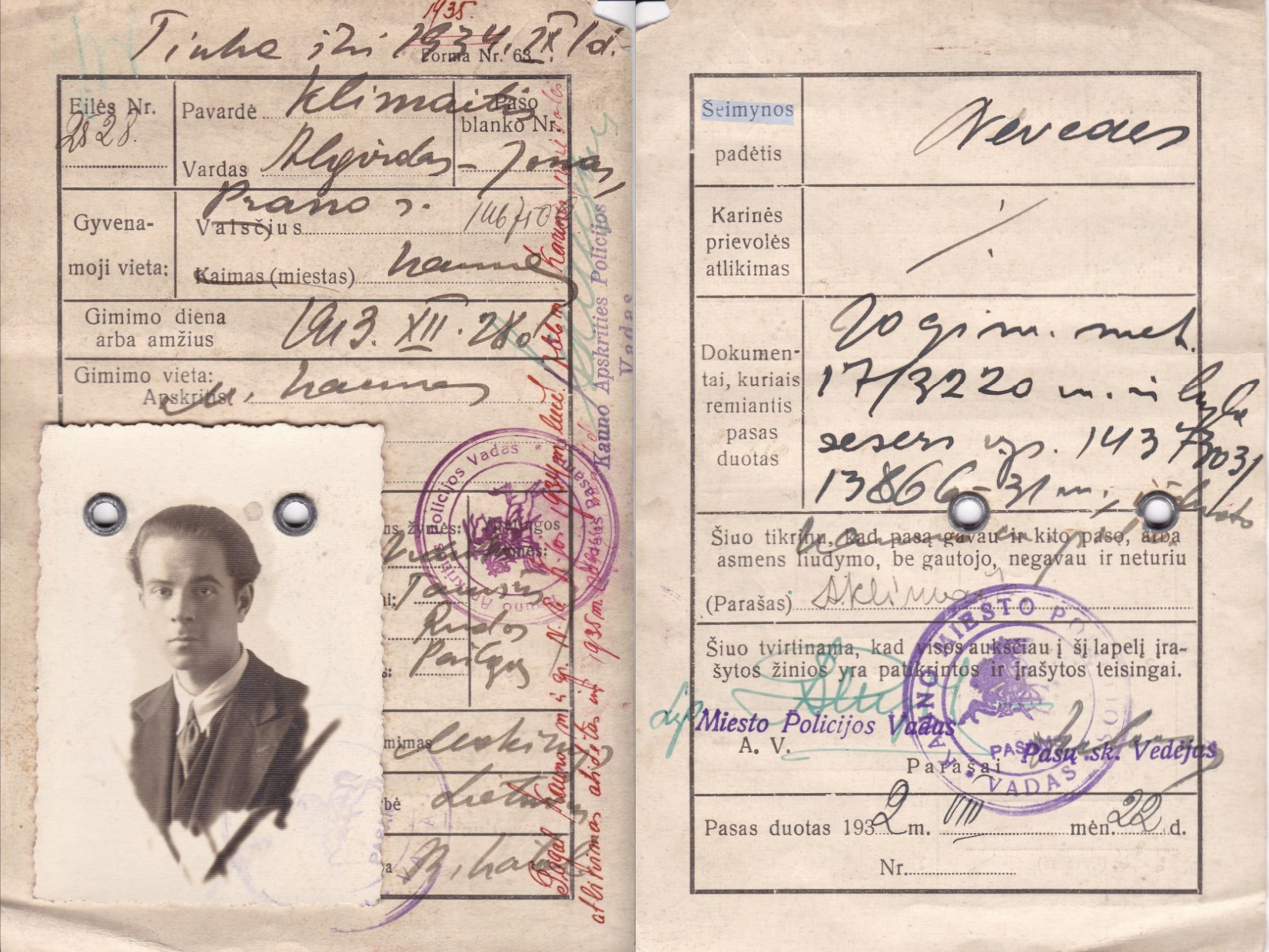
Algirdas Jonas Klimaitis, 1913–1988, Kaunas pogrom perpetrator in June 1941 (passport copy, 1932 August 22).

On the night of 25–26 June, the Kaunas pogrom, led by Klimaitis' unit, was instigated by Franz Walter Stahlecker, commanding officer of Einsatzgruppe A. By 28 June 1941, according to Stahlecker, 3,800 people had been killed in Kaunas and a further 1,200 in surrounding towns in the region. Klimaitis' men destroyed several synagogues and about sixty Jewish houses. Modern sources claim that the number of victims in Stahlecker's report were probably exaggerated. The murder of Slobodka's rabbi, Rav Zalman Osovsky, is attributed to Jonas Klimaitis's gang.

After the war, Klimaitis moved to Hamburg, Germany, where he was discovered in the late 1970s. Hamburg Police launched an investigation, but Klimaitis died in 1988, before the case could be brought to trial. In emigration, he gave his date of birth as December 28, 1910.

== Bibliography ==
- Rukšėnas, Alfredas (1 December 2021). "Holokaustas Lietuvoje: 1941 m. birželio 25–29 d. žydų pogromai Kaune". Genocidas Ir Rezistencija (in Lithuanian). 2 (50). Lietuvos gyventojų genocido ir rezistencijos tyrimo centras: 37–79. doi:10.61903/GR.2021.202.

== See also ==
- Lithuanian collaboration with Nazi Germany
