= Kaunas pogrom =

1941 massacre of Jews in Kaunas, Lithuania

Coordinates: 54°53′36″N 23°55′23″E

- Part of The Holocaust in Lithuania
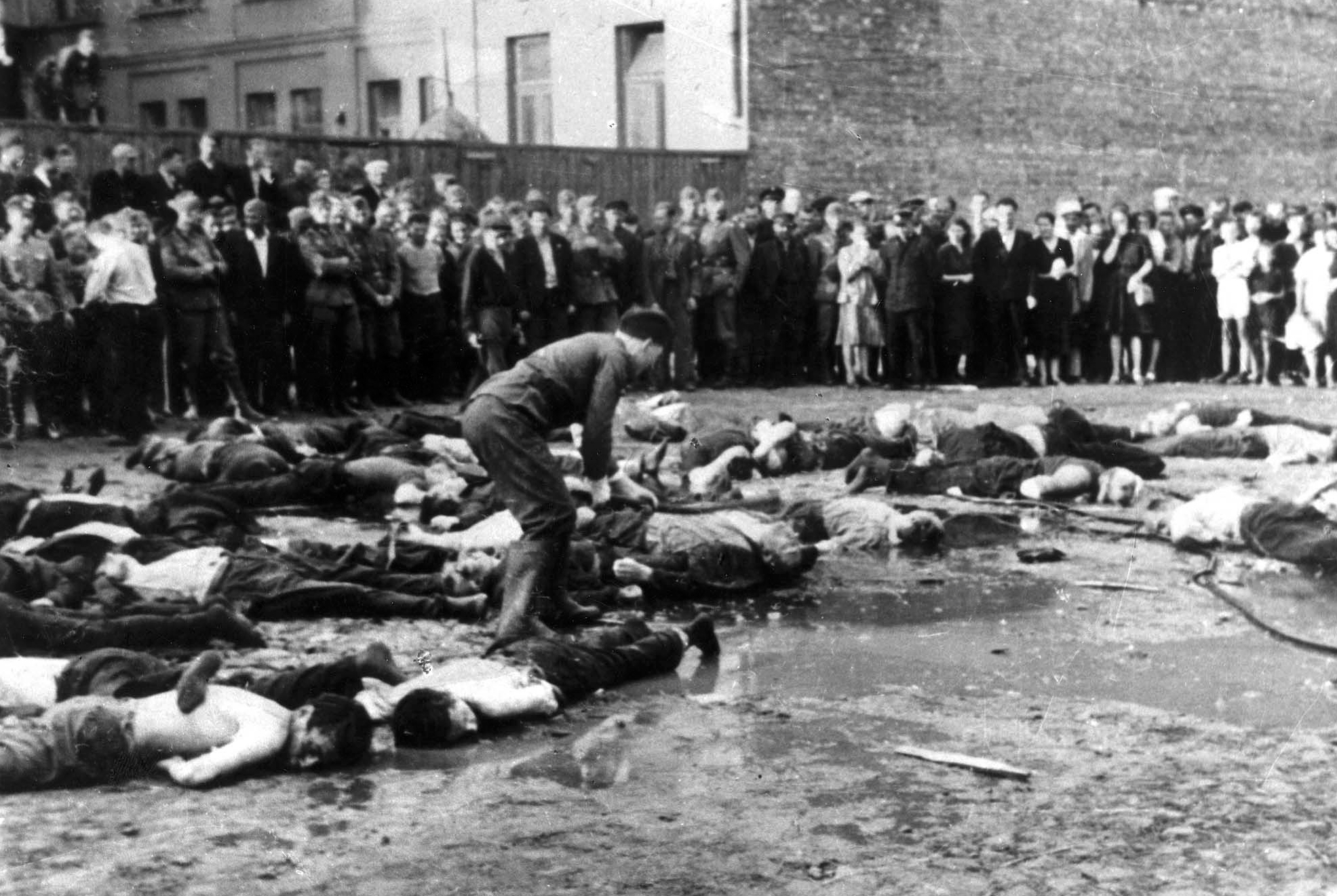
- Lithuanian civilians and German soldiers watching the massacre of 68 Jews in the Lietūkis garage of Kaunas on 25 or 27 June 1941.
- Location: Kaunas, German occupied Lithuania
- Date: 25-29 June 1941
- Deaths: 3,800 (according to Franz Walter Stahlecker)
- Perpetrators: Einsatzgruppen; Lithuanian nationalists

The Kaunas pogrom was a massacre of Jews living in Kaunas, Lithuania, that took place on 25–29 June 1941; the first days of Operation Barbarossa and the Nazi occupation of Lithuania. The most infamous incident occurred at the garage of NKVD Kaunas section, a nationalized garage of Lietūkis, an event known as the Lietūkis Garage Massacre. There several dozen Jewish men, allegedly associates of the NKVD, were publicly tortured and executed on 27 June in front of a crowd of Lithuanian men, women and children. The incident was documented by a German soldier who photographed the event as a man, nicknamed the "Death Dealer", beat each man to death with a metal bar. After June, systematic executions took place at various forts of the Kaunas Fortress, especially the Seventh and Ninth Fort.

== Background ==
The Lithuanian Activist Front (LAF), a far-right underground organisation operating inside Soviet Lithuania, took control of the city and much of the Lithuanian countryside on the evening of 23 June 1941. Nazi SS Brigadeführer Franz Walter Stahlecker arrived in Kaunas on the morning of 25 June. He visited the headquarters of the Lithuanian Security Police and delivered a long anti-Semitic speech encouraging Lithuanians to solve the "Jewish problem". According to Stahlecker's report of 15 October, local Lithuanians were not enthusiastic to start antisemitic violence, so he asked Algirdas Klimaitis to initiate pogroms. Klimaitis controlled a paramilitary unit of approximately 600 men that was organized in Tilsit by the SD,and was not subordinated to the LAF.

== Massacre ==
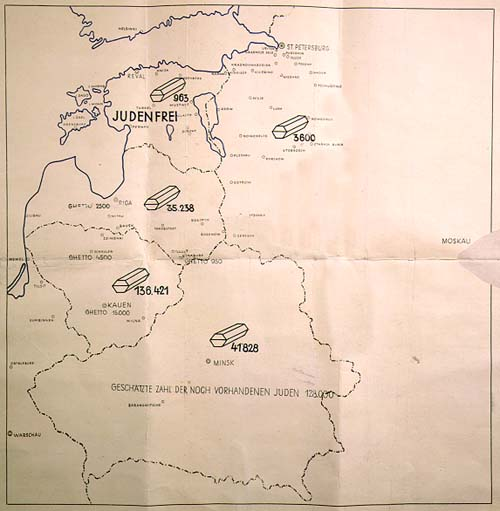
Map sent by Stahlecker to Heydrich, 31 January 1942, illustrating 1941 killings of Jews in the Baltic states under Stahlecker's command

Starting on 25 June, Lithuanian militia units organized by the Germans attacked Jewish civilians in Slobodka (Vilijampolė), a Jewish suburb of Kaunas that hosted the world-famous Slabodka yeshiva. According to Rabbi Ephraim Oshry, Germans were present on the bridge to Slobodka, but it was the Lithuanian volunteers who killed the Jews. The rabbi of Slobodka, Rav Zalman Osovsky, was tied hand and foot to a chair, "then his head was laid upon an open volume of gemora (volume of the Talmud) and [they] sawed his head off", after which they murdered his wife and son. His head was placed in a window of the residence, bearing a sign: "This is what we'll do to all the Jews."

As of 28 June 1941, according to Stahlecker, 3,800 people had been killed in Kaunas and a further 1,200 in other towns in the immediate region. Some believe Stahlecker exaggerated his murder tally.

Karl Jaeger, the Nazi commander of the mobile killing squad Einsatzkommando 3, wrote on December 1, 1941, that Nazis and Lithuanian partisans killed 7,800 Jews in Kovno between June 24, 1941, and July 6, 1941. Jaeger recorded 4,000 Jews in Kovno that were killed exclusively by Lithuanian partisans. (See Jaeger Report).

== Responsibility ==
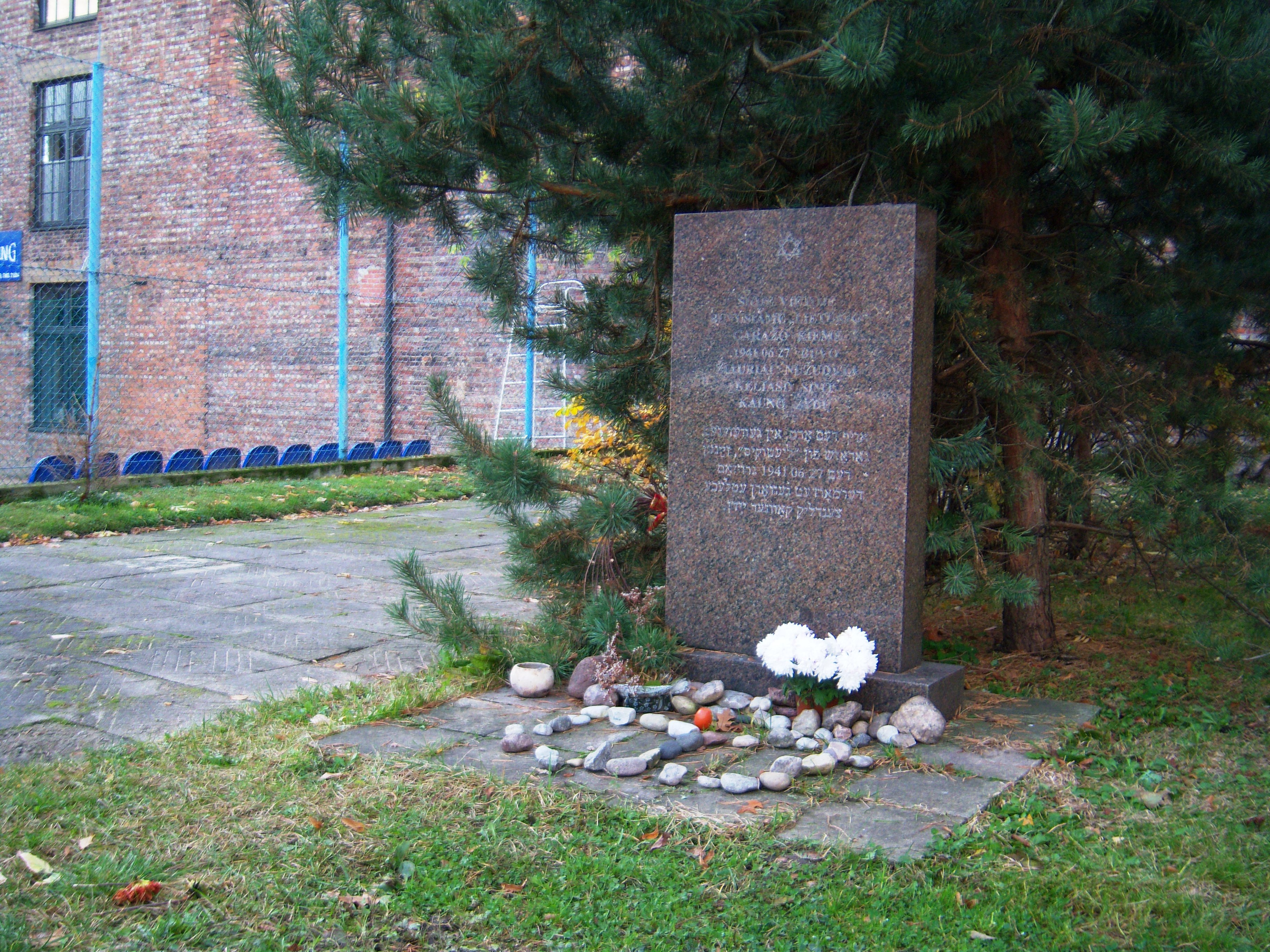
Kaunas pogrom memorial

The primary responsibility for initiating the massacres has been disputed, whether local Lithuanians or Nazi officials.

Memoirs of witnesses say that German soldiers in uniform participated in Lietūkis' sadistic tortures and massacres, but were also accompanied by Lithuanians recently freed from Kaunas Prison.

Franz Walter Stahlecker's report of 15 October to Heinrich Himmler said that he had given instructions to Algirdas Klimaitis to initiate pogroms. Stahlecker claimed to have given those instructions "in such a way that no German orders or instructions could be observed by outsiders."

Author Masha Greenbaum, who survived the pogrom, noted that massacres began even before the Germans arrived. She points out that executions took place in the countryside and not just in the city of Kaunas.

== Identification of the "Death Dealer" ==
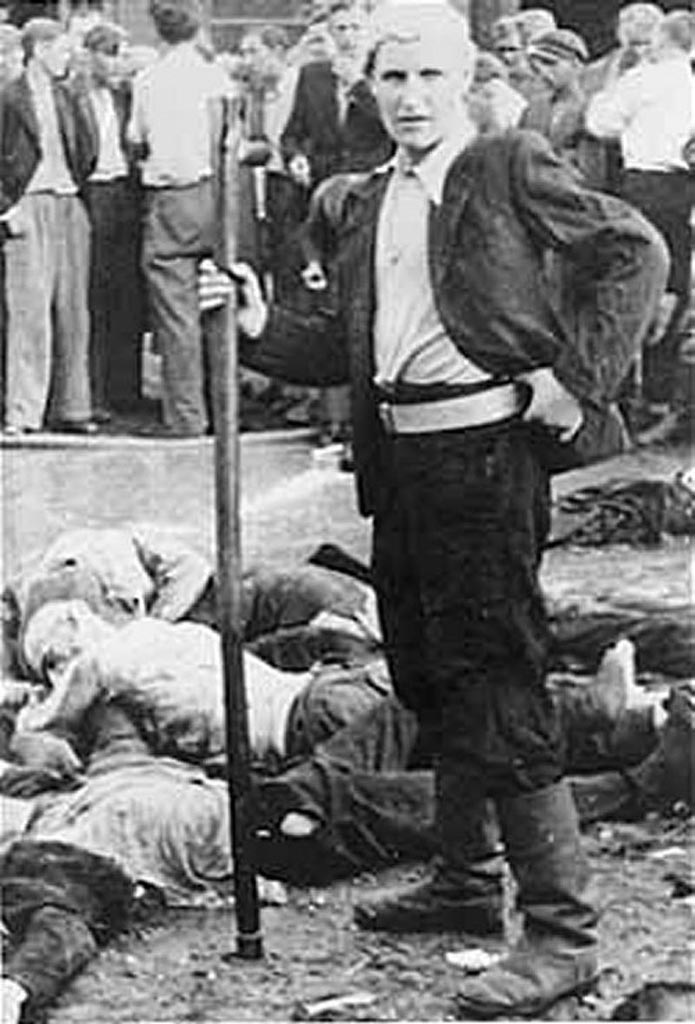
An unknown perpetrator (nicknamed the "Death Dealer") at the massacre in the Lietūkis garage. Alleged to be a man named Juozas Surmas.

Photographer Stanislovas Žvirgždas controversially suggested that many pictures from the Kaunas pogrom were falsified by gluing multiple pictures into collages, citing alleged discrepancies in the pictures. Additionally, he speculated that the "Death Dealer of Kovno" was German SS officer Joachim Hamann. Hamann was commanding officer of Rollkommando Hamann, a mobile killing unit attached to Einsatzkommando 3 that was active in the territory during the pogrom. Historian Arvydas Anušauskas, rebutted this speculation, identifying the Death Dealer as a man named Juozas Surmas. In addition to the photos and the testimony of the photographer, Wilhelmas Gunsilius, there are witness testimonies attesting that the Death Dealer was Lithuanian. Specifically, Gunsilius saw the man play the Lithuanian national anthem on the accordion while standing among the corpses. Another witness recalled a "Lithuanian blonde man, with rolled up sleeves and armed with a crowbar" beating Jews to death. Another told Gunsilius that the man's parents were executed by the NKVD two days earlier because they were nationalists. German colonel Von Bisschoffshausen observed a blonde man executing Jews with a "long iron bar as thick as a human arm," with the crowd around him cheering during the executions. Juozas Surmas was later identified as a member of the Lithuanian TDA Battalion, and confessed to murdering Jews in Kaunas.

== See also ==
- Kaunas Ghetto
- Kaunas massacre of October 29, 1941
