= Kovno Ghetto =

Jewish ghetto in Kaunas, German-occupied Lithuania during World War II

Coordinates: 54°54′57″N 23°53′18″E

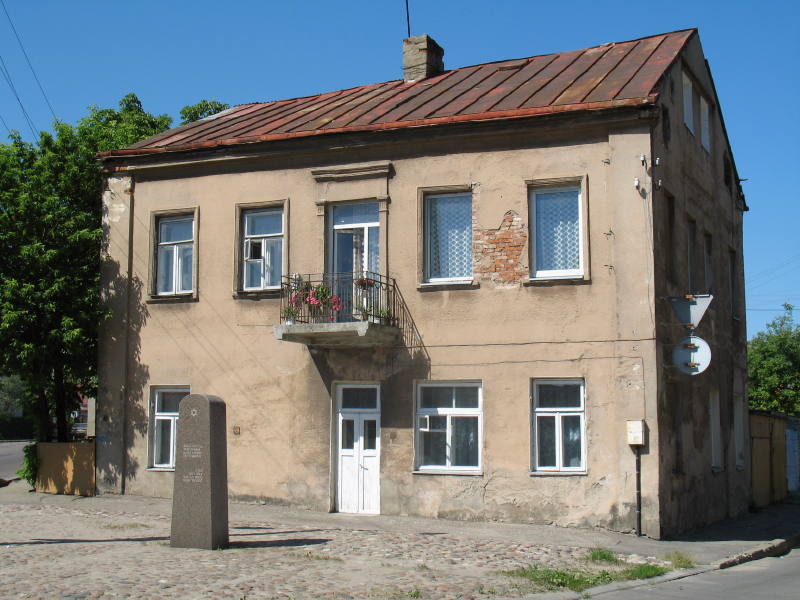
- Monument of the Kaunas Ghetto
- Location: Kaunas, German-occupied Lithuania, then part of "Reichskommissariat Ostland"
- Date: Summer 1941 to autumn 1943
- Incident type: Imprisonment, mass shootings, forced labor, starvation, mass deportations to Auschwitz and conversion into a labour camp
- Perpetrators: Germany
- Participants: Waffen-SS
- Organizations: Schutzstaffel, RSHA
- Camp: Auschwitz
- Victims: 29,000
- Survivors: 3,000

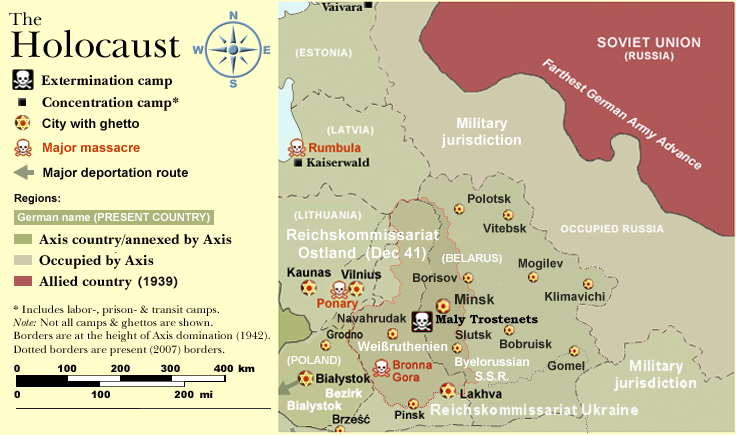
Ghettos Reichskommissariat Ostland (marked with red-gold stars)

The Kovno Ghetto was a ghetto established by Nazi Germany to hold the Lithuanian Jews of Kaunas (Kovno) during the Holocaust. At its peak, the ghetto held 29,000 people, most of whom were later sent to concentration and extermination camps, or were shot at the Ninth Fort. About 500 Jews escaped from work details and directly from the ghetto, and joined Jewish and Soviet partisan forces in the distant forests of southeast Lithuania and Belarus.

== Establishment ==
The Nazis established a civilian administration under SA Brigadefuhrer Hans Cramer to replace military rule in place from the invasion of Lithuania on June 22, 1941. The Lithuanian Provisional Government was officially disbanded by the Nazis after only a few weeks, but not before approval for the establishment of a ghetto under the supervision of Lithuanian military commandant of Kaunas Jurgis Bobelis, extensive laws enacted against Jews and the provision of auxiliary police to assist the Nazis in the genocide. Between July and August 15, 1941, the Germans concentrated Jews who survived the initial pogroms, some 29,000 people, in a ghetto established in Vilijampolė (Slabodka). It was an area of small primitive houses and no running water which had been cleared of its mainly Jewish population in pogroms by Lithuanian activists beginning on June 24.

== Organization ==
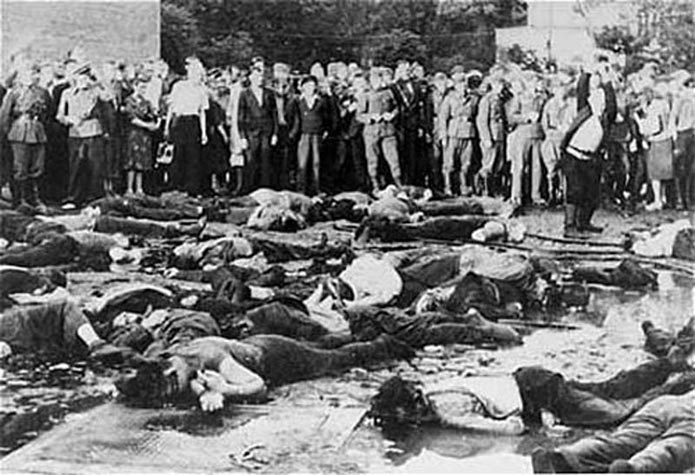
Civilians and German soldiers looking at the massacre of 68 Jews in the Lietukis garage of Kaunas on June 25 or 27, 1941, during the Kaunas pogrom

Initially, the ghetto had two parts, called the "small" and "large" ghetto, separated by Paneriai Street and connected by a small wooden bridge over the street. Each ghetto was enclosed by barbed wire and closely guarded from August 15, 1941. Both were overcrowded, with each person allocated less than ten square feet of living space. The Germans and Lithuanians destroyed the small ghetto on October 4, 1941, and killed almost all of its inhabitants at the Ninth Fort. Later, the Germans continually reduced the ghetto's size, forcing Jews to relocate several times. Later that same month, on October 29, 1941, the Germans staged what became known as the "Great Action". They selected around 10,000 Jews, including 5,000 children, assessed as "unfit" to work at the Ninth Fort. On October 29, 1941, Einsatzgruppen units shot most of these individuals at the Ninth Fort. The death toll on that one day was 9,200 Jews.

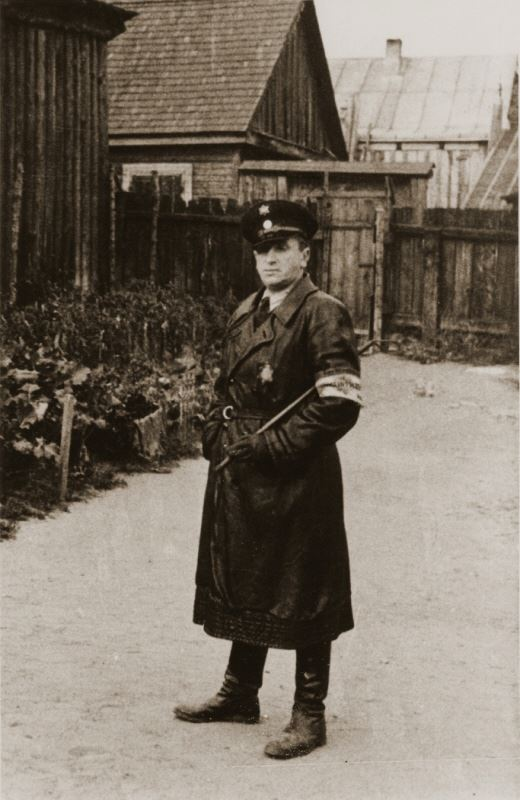
Tanchum Aharonsteim, Deputy Chief of Kaunas Ghetto Jewish Police and Commander of the Public Order Service, subordinate to Gestapo, with a baton in the Kovno Ghetto in 1944

There was a Jewish Police operating in the Kovno Ghetto with assigned tasks to ensure public order and fulfill German demands, while the policemen were privileged residents, compared to others suffering in the ghetto, and were beating prisoners.

The ghetto in Kovno provided forced labor for the German military. Jews were employed primarily as forced laborers at various sites outside the ghetto, especially in the construction of a military airbase in Aleksotas. The Jewish council (Aeltestenrat; "Council of Elders"), headed by Dr. Elkhanan Elkes, and his deputy, Leib Garfunkel, also created workshops inside the ghetto for those women, children, and elderly who could not participate in the labor brigades. Eventually, these workshops employed almost 6,500 people. The council hoped the Germans would not kill Jews who were producing for the army.

== Underground school and Kinder Aktion ==
As an act of defiance an underground school was conducted in the Kovno Ghetto when such education was banned in 1942. A remarkable photo of one of the classes of that school features in the US Holocaust publication, "The Hidden History of the Kovno Ghetto". Identification of the teacher visible in that photo is given in a website that deals with the hidden school.

On March 27–28, 1944, some 1,600 children aged 12 or less, alongside many of their parents who attempted to intervene, and elderly people aged 55 or more, approximately 2,500 in total, were rounded up and murdered in the Kinder Aktion ("children action"). Forty Jewish ghetto policemen who refused under torture to disclose hiding locations were also murdered by Bruno Kittel. During this time, police cars roamed the ghetto streets and music was blared over loudspeakers to mute the terrified screams of families. Reports of similar actions at other towns had reached the ghetto prior to the round-up, and some parents managed to smuggle their children to non-Jewish foster homes outside the ghetto. However, the vast majority of ghetto children were murdered. Very few Jewish children survived by the time Kovno was liberated by the Soviet forces on August 1, 1944.

== Smuggling babies out of the ghetto ==
From 1942 births were not permitted in the ghetto and pregnant women faced death. However a number of babies of ages from about 9 months to 15 months were smuggled out of the Kovno Ghetto to willing Lithuanian foster mothers.

== Orchestra ==
The orchestra operated in the ghetto between November 1, 1942, and September 15, 1943. Its leader and musical conductor was the famous pre-war Lithuanian musician Michael Hofmekler. Percy Haid, a Riga born Jew, was the house composer. The orchestra performed about 83 concerts, most of them were held in the building of the former Slobodka Yeshiva.

== Final days ==
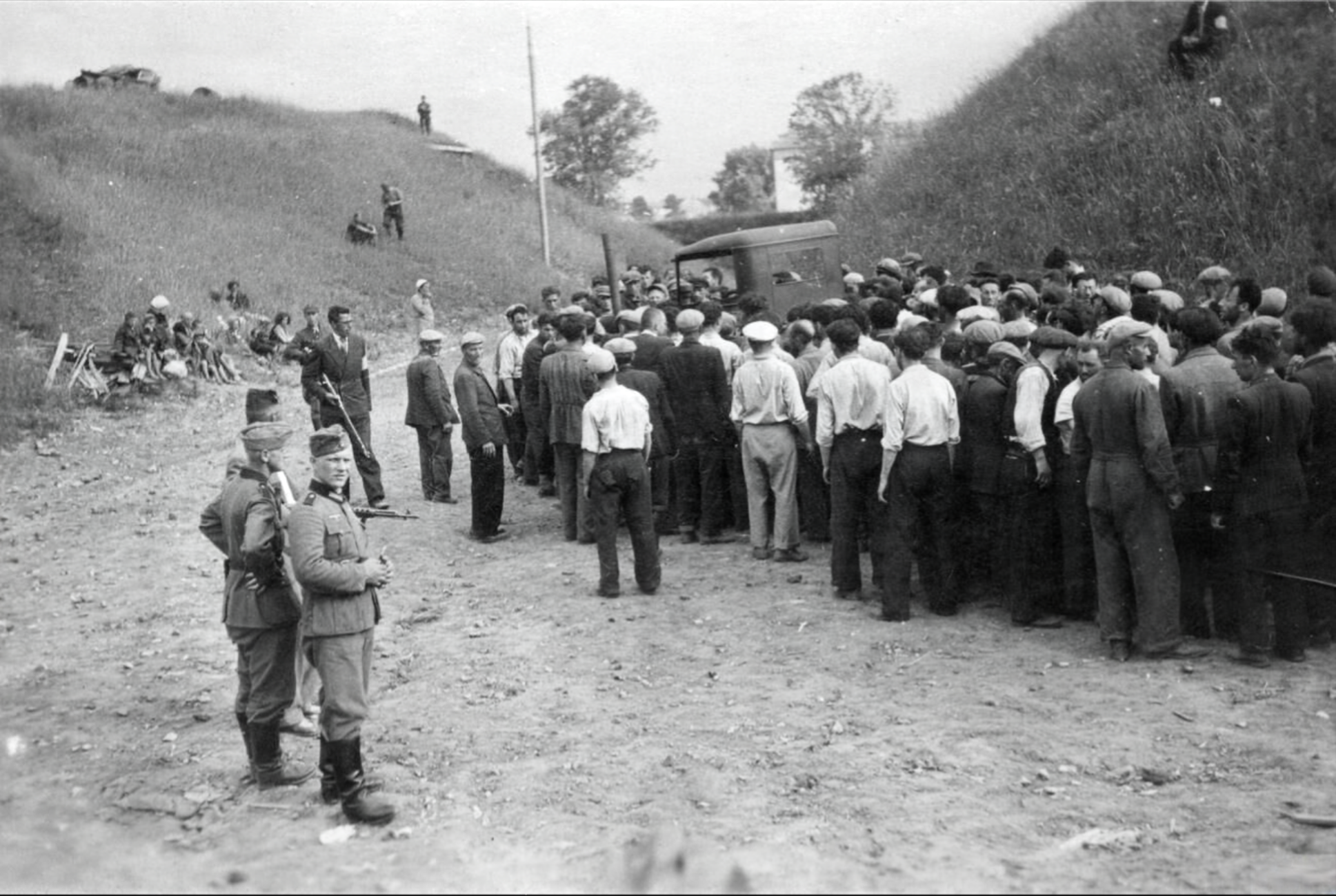
Wehrmacht soldiers (possibly members of the Einsatzgruppe A) and Lithuanians guarding a group of Jews in the Seventh Fort in Kaunas (Kovno), July 1941

In the autumn of 1943, the SS assumed control of the ghetto and converted it into the Kauen concentration camp. Wilhelm Göcke served as the camp's commandant. The Jewish council's role was drastically curtailed. The Nazis dispersed more than 3,500 Jews to subcamps where strict discipline governed all aspects of daily life. On October 26, 1943, the SS deported more than 2,700 people from the main camp. The SS sent those deemed fit to work to Vaivara concentration camp in Estonia, and deported children and elderly people to Auschwitz.

On July 8, 1944, the Germans evacuated the camp, deporting most of the remaining Jews to the Dachau concentration camp in Germany or to the Stutthof camp, near Danzig, on the Baltic coast. Three weeks before the Soviet army arrived in Kaunas, the Germans razed the ghetto to the ground with grenades and dynamite. As many as 2,000 people burned to death or were shot while trying to escape the burning ghetto. The Red Army occupied Kaunas on August 1, 1944. Of Kaunas' few Jewish survivors, 500 had survived in forests or in a single bunker which had escaped detection during the final liquidation; the Germans evacuated an additional 2,500 to concentration camps in Germany.

== Resistance ==
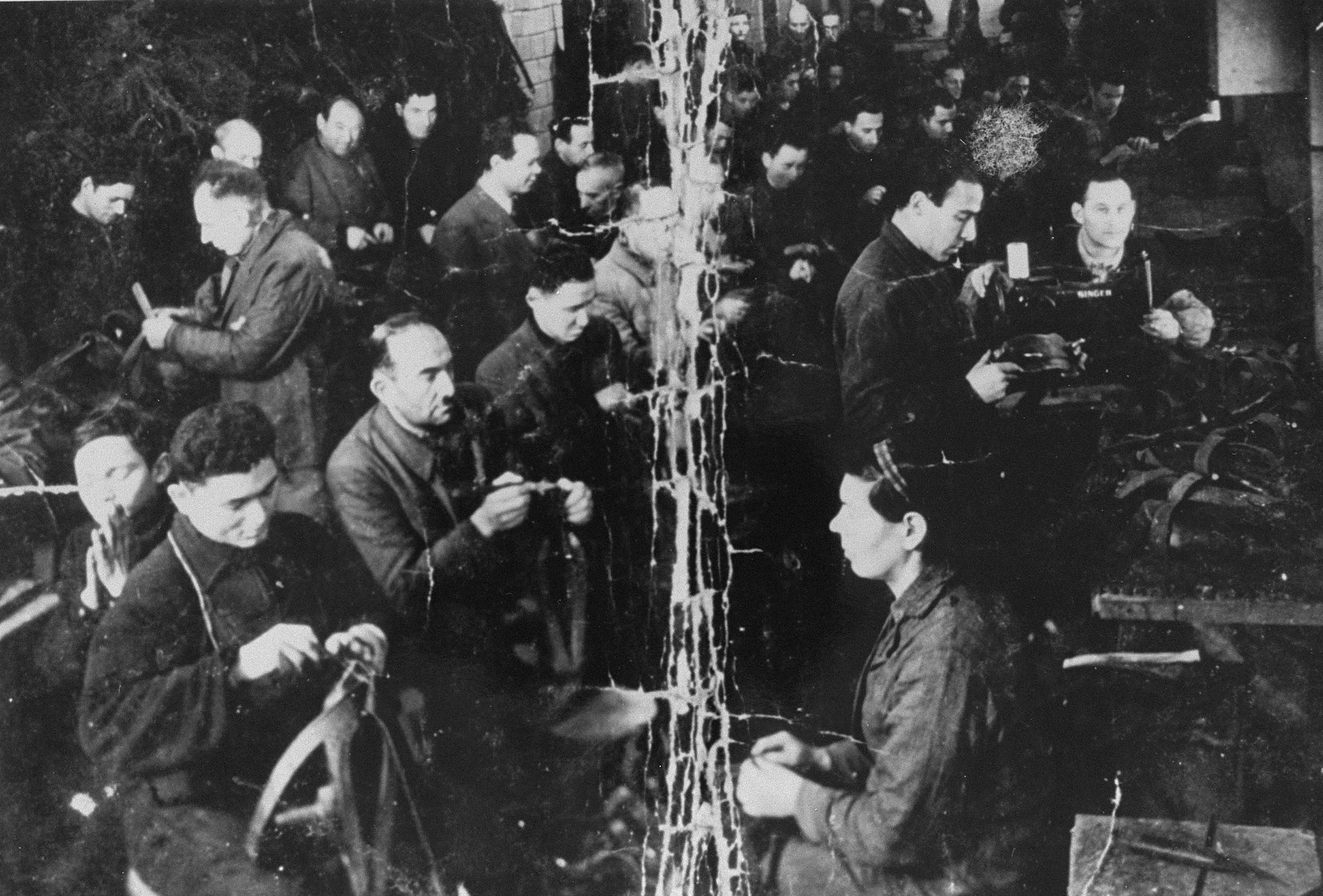
Workshop in the Kovno Ghetto

Throughout the years of hardship and horror, the Jewish community in Kovno documented its story in secret archives, diaries, drawings and photographs. Many of these artifacts lay buried in the ground when the ghetto was destroyed. Discovered after the war, these few written remnants of a once thriving community provide evidence of the Jewish community's defiance, oppression, resistance, and death. George Kadish (Hirsh Kadushin), for example, secretly photographed the trials of daily life within the ghetto with a hidden camera through the buttonhole of his overcoat.

The Kovno ghetto had several Jewish resistance groups. The resistance acquired arms, developed secret training areas in the ghetto, and established contact with Soviet partisans in the forests around Kovno.

In 1943, the General Jewish Fighting Organization (Yidishe Algemeyne Kamfs Organizatsye) was established, uniting the major resistance groups in the ghetto. Under this organization's direction, some 300 ghetto fighters escaped from the Kovno ghetto to join Jewish partisan groups. About 70 died in action.

The Jewish council in Kovno actively supported the ghetto underground. Moreover, a number of the ghetto's Jewish police participated in resistance activities. The Germans executed 34 members of the Jewish police for refusing to reveal specially constructed hiding places used by Jews in the ghetto.

== Notable prisoners ==
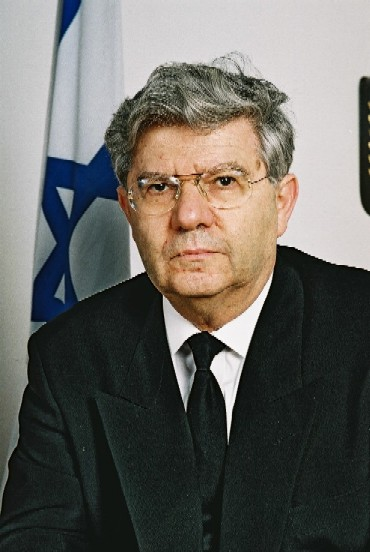
Aharon Barak, survivor of the Kovno Ghetto and later President of the Supreme Court of Israel (1995–2006)

- Aharon Barak, who was smuggled out of the ghetto by a Lithuanian farmer.
- Zev Birger
- Leyb Gorfinkel
- Elly Gotz
- Kama Ginkas
- George Kadish
- Joseph Kagan, Baron Kagan
- Avraham Duber Kahana Shapiro
- Ephraim Oshry
- Abe Rich
- Sidney Shachnow
- Aleksandras Štromas
- Sara Ginaite
- Elchonon Wasserman (arrested there while on a trip)

== See also ==
- Kaunas pogrom (June 25–29, 1941)
- Kaunas massacre of October 29, 1941
- List of Nazi concentration camps
- Theodor Adrian von Renteln
- Erich Ehrlinger
- Nazi concentration camps
- World War II
- Bruno Kittel
- Rudolf Neugebauer

== Bibliography ==
- This article incorporates text from the United States Holocaust Memorial Museum, and has been released under the GFDL.
- Gar, Joseph. Umkum fun der Yidisher Kovne. Munich, 1948.
- Goldberg, Jacob. Bletlech fun Kovner Eltestnrat // Fun letztn Churbn, No. 7, Munich, 1948.
- Grinhoyz, Shmuel. Dos kultur-lebn in kovner geto // Lite (M. Sudarsky et al., eds.), vol. 1. – New York 1951.
- Lurie, Esther. A living witness: Kovno ghetto – scenes and types: 30 drawings and water-colours with accompanying text. – Tel Aviv, 1958.
- Garfunkel, Leib. Kovna ha-Yehudit be-Hurbanah. – Jerusalem, 1959.
- Lazerson-Rostovski, Tamar. Yomanah shel Tamarah: Ḳovnah 1942–1946. – Tel Aviv, 1975.
- Goldstein-Golden, Lazar. From Ghetto Kovno to Dachau. – New York, 1985.
- Frome, Frieda. Some dare to dream: Frieda Frome's escape from Lithuania – Ames, 1988.
- Mishell, William W. Kaddish for Kovno: life and death in a Lithuanian ghetto 1941–1945. – Chicago, 1988.
- Tory, Avraham. Surviving the Holocaust: the Kovno Ghetto diary. – Cambridge, 1990.
- Kowno // Enzyklopädie des Holocaust. Die Verfolgung und Ermordung der europäischen Juden, Band II. – Berlin, 1993, p. 804–807.
- Oshry, Ephraim. The annihilation of Lithuanian Jewry – New York, 1995.
- Levin, Dov. Fighting back: Lithuanian Jewry's armed resistance to the Nazis, 1941–1945. – New York, 1997, p. 116–125, 157–160.
- Elkes, Joel. Values, belief and survival: Dr Elkhanan Elkes and the Kovno Ghetto. – London, 1997.
- Hidden history of the Kovno Ghetto. – Boston, 1997.
- Littman, Sol. War criminal on trial: Rauca of Kaunas. – Toronto, 1998.
- Ginsburg, Waldemar. And Kovno wept. – Laxton, 1998.
- Birger, Zev. No time for patience: my road from Kaunas to Jerusalem: a memoir of a Holocaust survivor. – New York, 1999.
- Beiles, Yudel. Judke. – Vilnius, 2002.
- Ganor, Solly. Light one candle: a survivor's tale from Lithuania to Jerusalem. – New York, 2003.
- Segalson, Arie. Ba-Lev ha-Ofel. Kiliona shel Kovno ha-yehudit – mabat mi-bifhim. – Jerusalem, 2003.
- Ginaite-Rubinson, Sara. Resistance and survival: the Jewish community in Kaunas, 1941–1944. – Oakville, 2005.
- The Yad Vashem encyclopedia of the ghettos during the Holocaust. Vol. 1: A-M. – Jerusalem, 2009, p. 290–299.
- Smuggled in potato sacks: fifty stories of the hidden children of the Kaunas Ghetto. – London, 2011.
- Dieckmann, Christoph. Deutsche Besatzungspolitik in Litauen, 1941–1944, 2 t. – Göttingen, 2011, p. 930–958, 1055–1105.
- The clandestine history of the Kovno Jewish ghetto police / by anonymous members of the Kovno Jewish ghetto police. – Bloomington, 2014.
- Rapoport, Safira A Pedigreed Jew: Between There and Here Kovno and Israel, Jerusalem, Yad Vashem, 2010.
