= Helmut Rauca =

German war criminal (1908–1983)

- Rauca's identity photo from Canadian CBC broadcast (4 November 1982)
- Born: 3 November 1908; Trieb, Falkenstein, Kingdom of Saxony, German Empire
- Died: 29 October 1983 (aged 74); Kassel, Hesse, West Germany
- Occupation: Einsatzkommando in German-occupied Europe
- Known for: His participation in the Kaunas massacre of October 29, 1941; Becoming the first Nazi war criminal to be extradited from Canada
- SS service
- Allegiance: Nazi Germany
- Branch: Schutzstaffel
- Service years: 1936–1945
- Rank: SS-Hauptscharführer (master sergeant)
- Nickname: Ruakh (The Devil)
- Unit: Einsatzgruppe A

Helmut Rauca (3 November 1908 – 29 October 1983) was a Holocaust perpetrator instrumental in the murder of more than 10,000 Jews from the Kaunas Ghetto, Lithuania, during World War II. He was a member of Einsatzgruppe A in the rank of Hauptscharführer (master sergeant). As the Gestapo Jewish Affairs Specialist, Rauca was responsible for the selection of about one-third of the Ghetto inmates including men, women, and children, to be killed during the Große Aktion known as the Kaunas massacre of October 29, 1941, perpetrated at the remote Ninth Fort on the outskirts of Kaunas. Feared for his ruthlessness, he was nicknamed "Ruakh" by inmates (a play on his surname - Yiddish for "demon" or "devil").

After the war, Rauca emigrated to Canada legally in 1950. He had become a Canadian citizen in 1956 under his own name and embarked on a successful business career. At the age of seventy-three, he was charged by the Canadian authorities with aiding and abetting in the murder of 10,500 persons forty-three years earlier, in Kaunas.

== Life ==
Helmut Albert Rauca was born in Trieb, Falkenstein, Kingdom of Saxony. His father Albert was Austrian and his mother Alma née Wolf was born in Trieb. Rauca apprenticed in a Plauen textile mill and joined the Nazi Party two years before Hitler's rise to power. He became a professional policeman in 1928 serving with the Order Police (Ordnungspolizei); in 1935 transferred to the detective division called Kripo (Kriminalpolizei) where he joined the SS, card number 290 335. He entered Kaunas on 3 July 1941 during Operation Barbarossa with the SS unit of Einsatzgruppe "A". Rauca lied to the Canadian officials, that he went to Kovno (Kaunas) half a year later in February or March 1942. After the war, Rauca was interned by the U.S. Army, but was released in 1948.

Rauca arrived in Canada on 13 December 1950 at Saint John, New Brunswick, aboard the Canadian ship Beaverbrae from Bremerhaven. He did not change his name but switched his given names Helmut Albert to Albert Helmut which was enough to prevent detection for the next thirty years. The German police had been looking for him since 1961. Nevertheless, the German warrant for his arrest was only issued over twenty years later on 27 May 1982, requesting Rauca's extradition from Canada. Rauca was accused of sending 11,584 people to their deaths in the period between 18 August 1941 and 25 December 1943. The warrant listed several war crimes including the 18 August 1941 murder of 534 Jews from the Ghetto, perpetrated at Fort Four of the Kaunas Fortress over the edge of a prepared ditch.

Rauca was arrested on 17 June 1982, at the request of the West German government. Over the Crown's objections, he was granted a $150,000 bail, a decision which was upheld on appeal. However, Rauca voluntarily remained in jail, fearing possible reprisals if he left custody. In May 1983, Rauca dropped further appeals against his extradition. He was flown to Frankfurt on 20 May 1983. He died of cancer on 29 October 1983, while awaiting trial in custodial detention.

== Bibliography ==
- Littman, Sol (1983). War Criminal on Trial: Rauca of Kaunas (PDF). New York, NY: JewishGen, Inc. ISBN 978-1-939561-30-5.
