= Eighth Fort =

Coordinates: 54°55′11″N 23°53′07″E

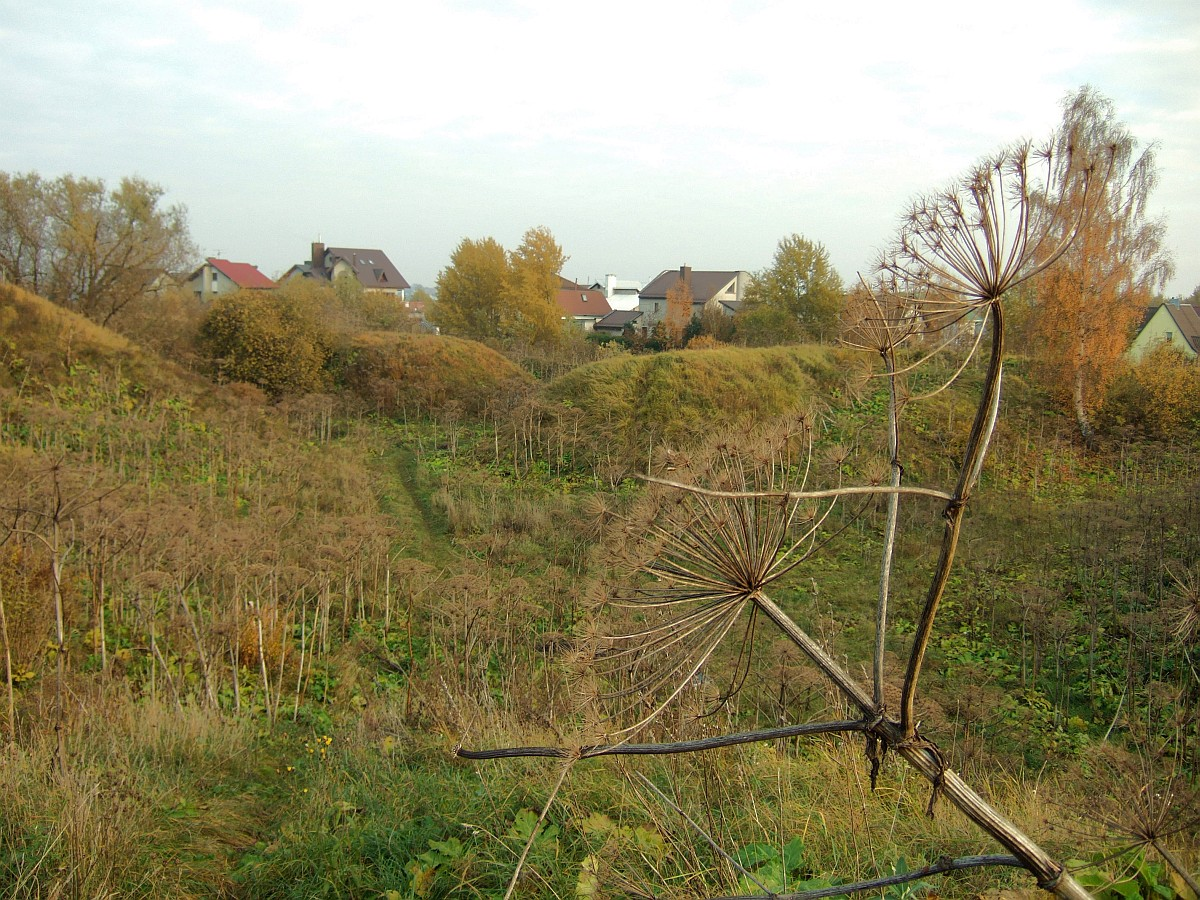
Kaunas Eighth Fort

Kaunas Eighth Fort (Lithuanian: VIII Kauno fortas), also known as Linkuva, is a former military fort in Šilainiai elderate, Kaunas, Lithuania. Built in 1889–1890, it is part of Kaunas Fortress, which was constructed by the Russian Empire. The Eighth Fort was the first element of Kaunas Fortress to use concrete. The structure is currently abandoned and semi-flooded. The slopes of the fort have been used since the interwar period as a community garden.

== History ==
The construction of the Eighth Fort began in 1889, after the first seven forts of Kaunas Fortress had already been designed and constructed. The earlier forts did not form a fully enclosed defensive ring around the city of Kaunas, and so the Eighth Fort was built to protect against attacks from the northwest. Although the earlier forts were constructed in red brick, the Eighth Fort is made from concrete and covered in soil. It was also the first fort of Kaunas Fortress to be equipped with electricity, which was provided via an oil-powered generator. However the fort was compromised by its position, which was not the highest point in the area, and so it was superseded four years later by the Ninth Fort. For this reason, the Eighth Fort was used only as barracks and later an armoury.

During World War I, the fort's crew detonated the ammunition remaining in storage before retreating. The blast severely damaged the fort and its drainage system, resulting in the flooding of much of the structure.

In the 21st century, the fort was designated as a protected area for bat hibernation under the European bat conservation agreement. The fort was also added to the Lithuanian Register of Cultural Property (Kultūros Vertybių Registras) in 2002. Cultural events have taken place in the fort, including a sound and light installation, photography exhibition, pyrotechnic acrobatics show and a peer learning programme about bees.

== Gardens ==
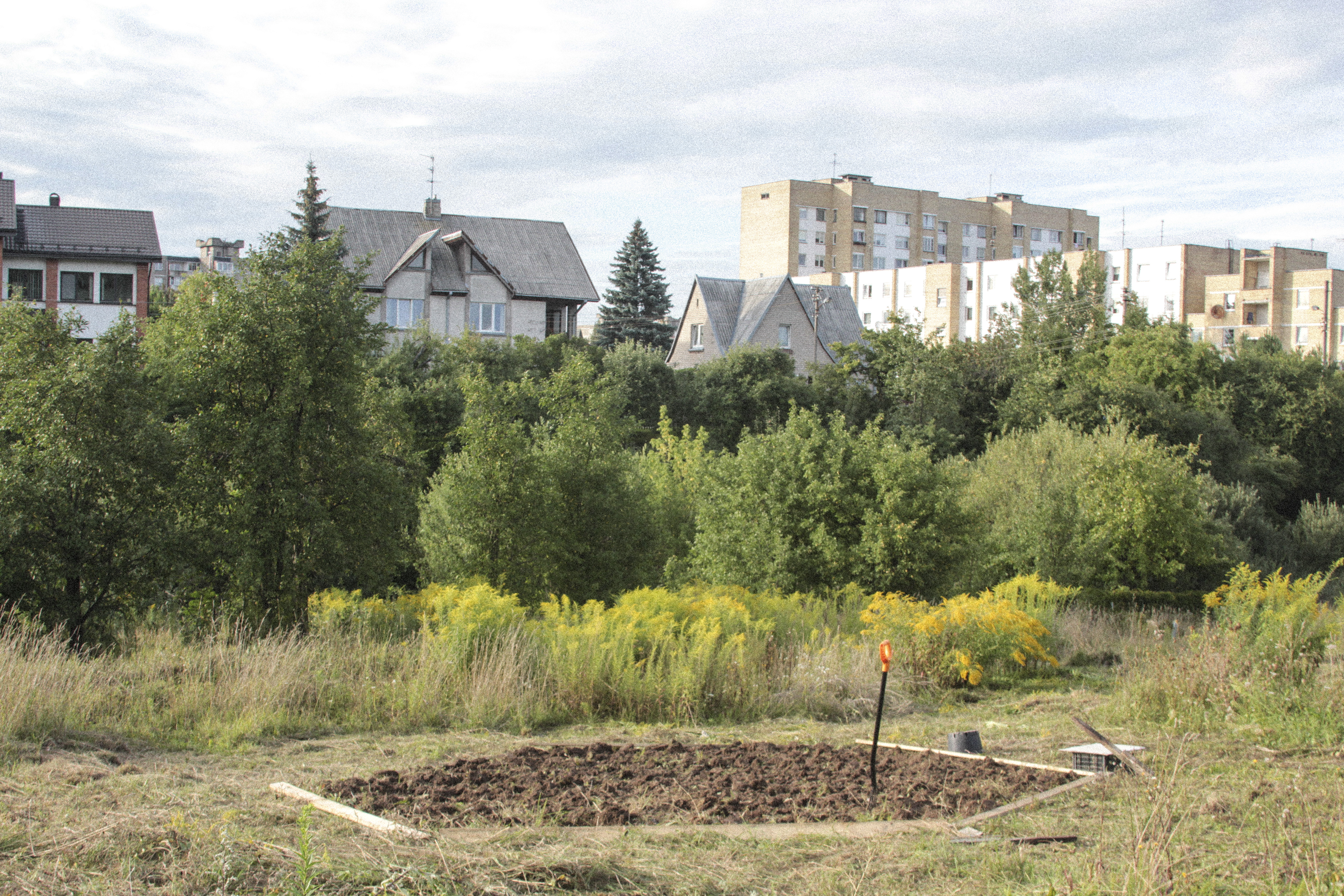
A bee-friendly flower bed at the community garden

Since the interwar period, the earthworks leading up to the fort have been used by the residents of Šilainiai to grow vegetables. In addition to the produce grown in beds, there are a range of native trees, including oak, birch, apple and plum. In 2018 stakeholders and members of the community formalised the gardens under the name Šilainių Sodai (Šilainiai Gardens), with the aim of preserving the living history of the community garden as part of the historic military site.
