= Kaunas massacre of October 29, 1941 =

Largest Mass Murder of Lithuanian Jews

Coordinates: 54°56′41″N 23°52′14″E

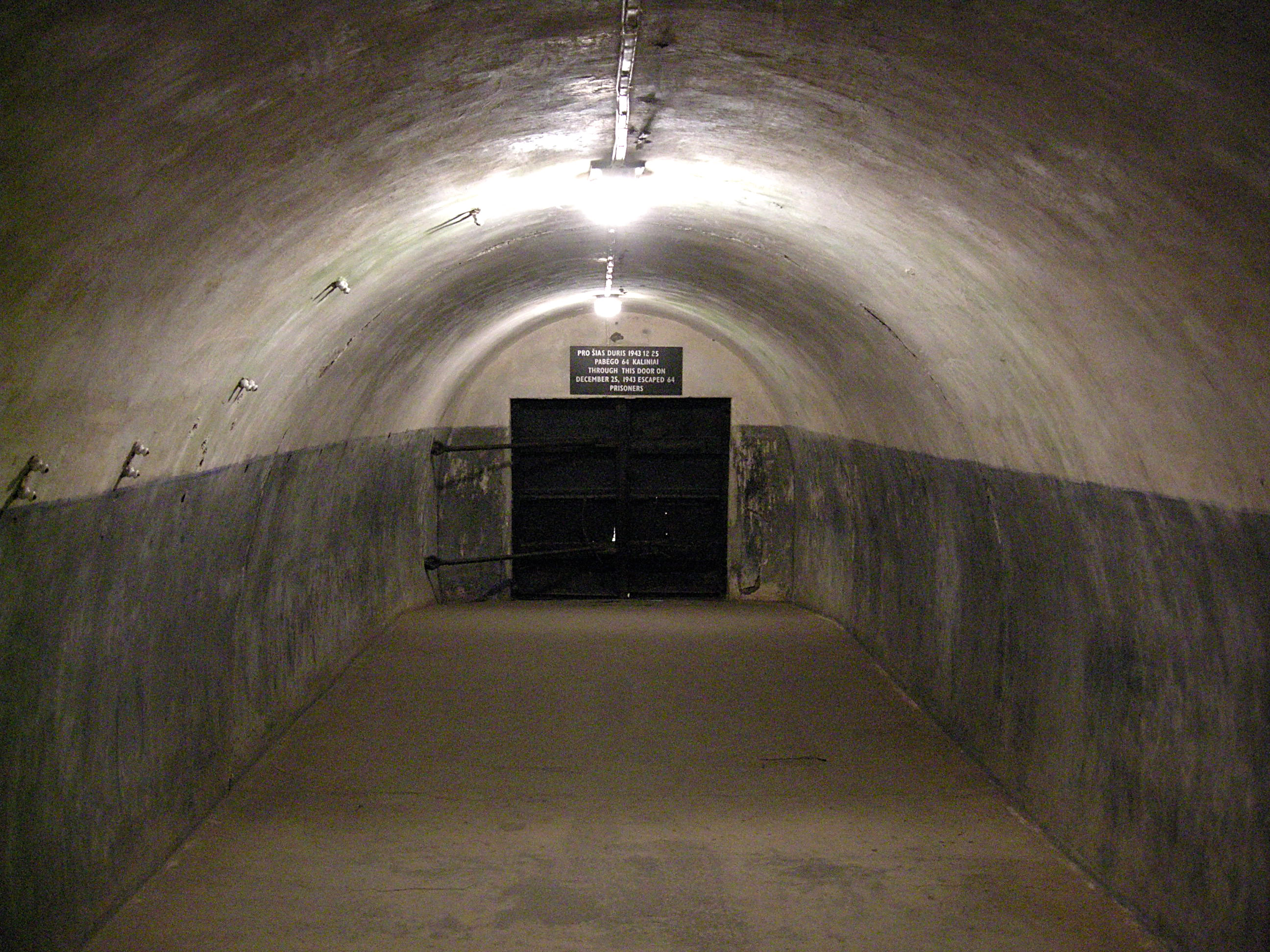
Ninth Fort.

The Kaunas massacre of October 29, 1941, also known as the Great Action, was the largest mass murder of Lithuanian Jews. 9,200 people among them 2,007 Jewish men, 2,920 women, and 4,273 children were murdered in a single day at the Ninth Fort.

== Background ==
Kaunas, also known as Kovno, was the second largest city in Lithuania. Jews made up 25% of its population and it had a large Jewish community, including many synagogues, schools, and newspapers. The Slobodka yeshiva was a well respected institution of higher learning and attracted students from many places.

The Soviet Union occupied Lithuania in June 1940 and confiscated property and closed most cultural and religious institutions, including Jewish ones. They arrested and exiled thousands to Siberia.

At this time the Lithuanian Activist Front, a pro-Nazi resistance organization opposing the Soviets, falsely blamed the Jews for the Soviet occupation and accused them of collaborating with them. They distributed pamphlets that called for the elimination of Jews from Lithuania and encouraged violence against Jews.

== Occupation by German forces ==
The Nazis invaded Lithuania on June 24, 1941 and the Einsatzgruppen encouraged local groups to mob and kill Jews.

By the order of SS-Standartenführer Karl Jäger and SS-Rottenführer Helmut Rauca, the Sonderkommando under the leadership of SS-Obersturmführer Joachim Hamann, and 8 to 10 men from Einsatzkommando 3, murdered 2,007 Jewish men, 2,920 women, and 4,273 children in a single day at the Ninth Fort in Kaunas, Generalbezirk Litauen, as German occupied Lithuania was then known. Almost the entire 1st Police Battalion took part in the operation, with the actual killings carried out by the 3rd Company.

On October 25, Rauca ordered that all Kaunas' Jews assemble at 6 A.M. on the morning of October 28 to identify Jews able to work. Any Jew who disobeyed would be shot. Approximately 27,000 Jews assembled in Demokratu Square on the morning of October 28, while armed Lithuanian partisans raided the Jews' houses looking for anyone who might be hiding.

Abraham Malnik, a survivor of this action, describes massacre in Kovno's Ninth Fort, near the Kovno ghetto in testimony to the US Holocaust museum.

Machine gun emplacements surrounded the square, while the Ghetto fence was guarded by German policemen and Lithuanian partisans. Kaunas' Jews were ordered to line up by family and workplace, and stand for hours in the rain and snow while Helmut Rauca, the Gestapo officer in charge of the Ghetto, separated the Jews into two groups. Ghetto survivor Alex Faitelson, who later escaped from the killing site at the Ninth Fort, described the separation:

"The elderly, the apparently ailing, and the large poorly dressed and unclean families, and those who had no connection to a working group, were directed by a movement of Rauca's whip to the right where the Lithuanian police forces were standing...There they were lined up in columns, surrounded by the Lithuanian police and taken to the former small ghetto."

By the end of the day on October 28, Rauca and his collaborators had forced 9,200 Jewish men, women, and children into the former small ghetto, or about one-third of Kaunas' Jewish population. Kaunas Ghetto inmate and survivor Abraham Tory described the return of the remaining Jews to their homes that evening:

"About 17,000 out of some 27,000 people slowly left the vast square where they had been standing for more than twelve hours. Hungry, thirsty, crushed and dejected, they returned home, most of them bereaved or orphaned, having been separated from a father, a mother, children, a brother or a sister, a grandfather or a grandmother, an uncle or an aunt. A deep mourning descended on the Ghetto. In every house there were now empty rooms, unoccupied beds, and the belongings of those who had not returned from the selection."

The following day, October 29, Germans police and Lithuanian partisans forced the Jews who had spent the night in the former small ghetto to leave the Ghetto and march uphill to the Ninth Fort, a Czarist-era fortress on the outskirts of Kaunas. Kaunas Ghetto survivor Alex Faitelson described the morning of October 29th:

"I was one of the Jews who ran to see what was happening in Paneriu Street in the small ghetto. I witnessed how the Jews were being expelled from the houses, aligned in columns, and brought to the Ninth Fort. Any illusions they may have had that they would continue to live in the small ghetto vanished. It was clear that they could not expect to live."

The forced march of Jews to the Ninth Fort lasted from dawn until noon, while Lithuanian spectators watched from the sides of the road. At the Ninth Fort, hundreds of Soviet prisoners of war had been forced to dig enormous pits. On October 29, Gestapo agents led by SS Colonel Karl Jaeger, and Lithuanian policemen, occupied machine gun positions alongside the pits and guarded the fort's perimeter. Kaunas Ghetto inmate and survivor Abraham Tory described the massacre that followed, as 9,200 of Kaunas' Jews were forced into the fort:

"In the fort, the wretched people were immediately set upon by the Lithuanian killers, who stripped them of every valuable article - gold rings, earrings, bracelets. They forced them to strip naked, pushed them into pits which had been prepared in advance, and fired into each pit with machine guns which had been positioned there in advance...Villagers living in the vicinity of the fort told stories of horrors they had seen from a distance, and of the heartrending cries that emanated from the fort..."

Vytautas Petkevičius, a Lithuanian who, during the Nazi occupation, witnessed Jews being marched to the Ninth Fort and heard the sound of gunshots, recalled that idling tractors without mufflers were used to try to drown out the sound of gunfire during the mass shootings.

Ignas Veliavicius-Vylius, a Lithuanian commander, described the massacre on October 29th:

People were lined up in columns of four abreast and taken from the gate of the fort towards the pits. At a certain distance from the pits, they were told to take off their outer clothing and go towards the pits. They were then pushed into the pits and forced to lie down while being shot...Throughout the day one could hear the sound of the victims' groans and shouting as well as the weeping of women and the cries of little children...At the same time, there was a sort of rally in the courtyard. Speeches were addressed to the waiting Jews calling on them to go to their death upright, with heads held high. There were others who shouted slogans to activate a revolutionary struggle for freedom. These demonstrations helped me to keep order, as some of the people were listening to the speeches while others, that is the majority, prayed..."

On October 29th, all of these people were shot at the Ninth Fort in huge pits dug in advance.

== See also ==
- Holocaust in Lithuania
- Kaunas pogrom
- Ponary massacre
