= Subdivisions of Kaunas =

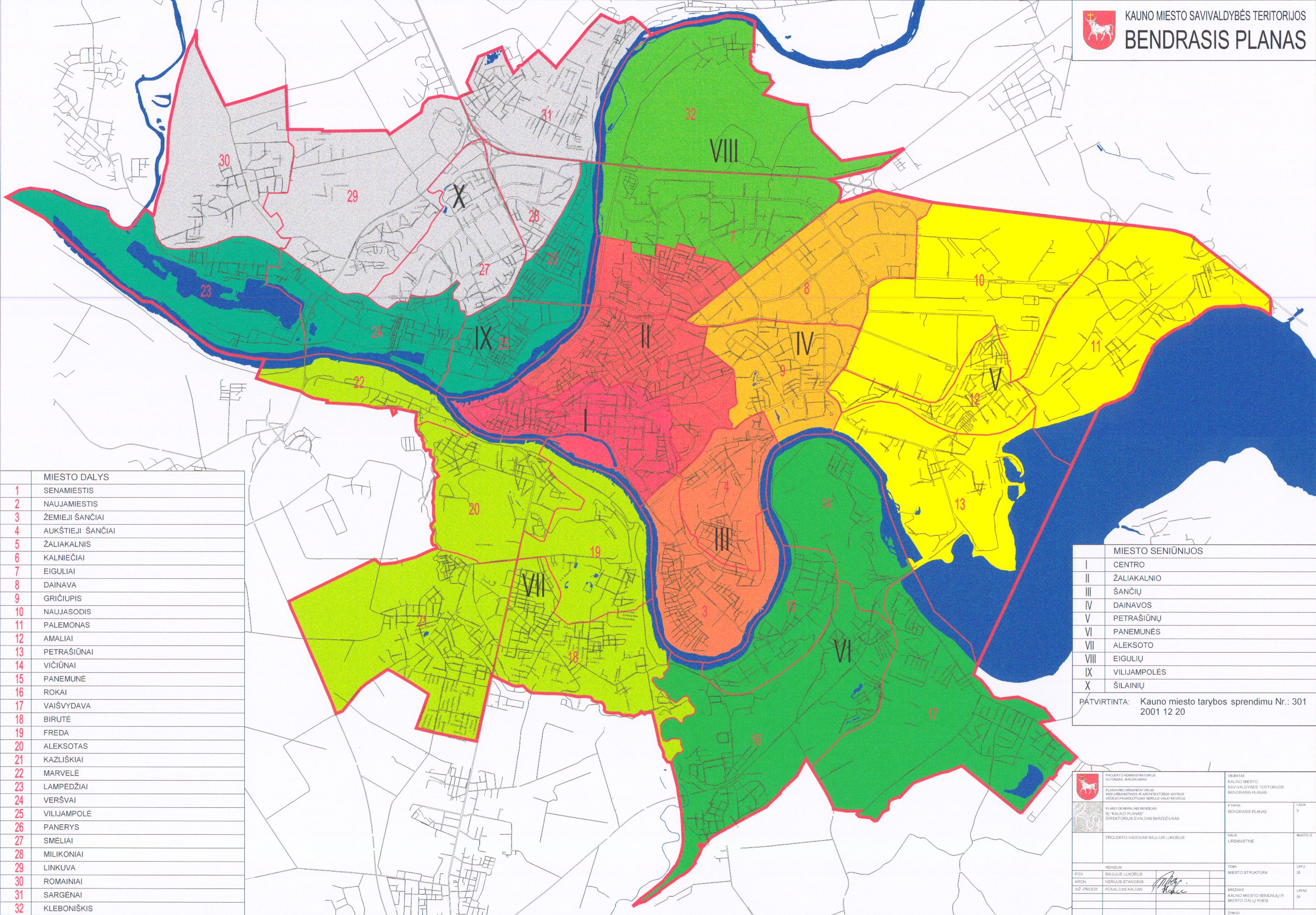
2001 general plan of Kaunas

The major administrative subdivisions of Kaunas, Lithuania, are elderates (Lithuanian: seniūnija, "eldership"). They are further partitioned into traditional neighborhoods of two levels: "city parts" (miesto dalys) and "city territories" (miesto teritorijos).

== Subdivision ==
According to the 2001 general plan, the city was subdivided into 10 elderates and 32 city parts as shown in the table.

Currently Kaunas city municipality has 11 elderates.

| Elderate | City parts | City territories |
|---|---|---|
| Aleksotas elderate | Aleksotas | Yliškės, Linksmadvaris |
| Aleksotas elderate | Birutė | Birutė I, Birutė II, Jiesia |
| Aleksotas elderate | Freda | Aukštoji Freda, Žemoji Freda |
| Aleksotas elderate | Kazliškiai | Armaniškiai, Julijanava, Narsiečiai, Naugardiškė, Tirkiliškiai |
| Aleksotas elderate | Marvelė | Marva |
| Centras eldership | Naujamiestis | |
| Centras eldership | Senamiestis | |
| Eiguliai elderate | Eiguliai | Murava |
| Eiguliai elderate | Kleboniškis | Naujasodis |
| Dainava elderate | Dainava | |
| Gričiupis elderate (Note: Gričiupis elderate was split from Dainava in 2005) | Gričiupis | |
| Panemunė elderate | Panemunė | |
| Panemunė elderate | Rokai | Prendzeliava, Rokeliai |
| Panemunė elderate | Vaišvydava | Armališkės, Zuikinė |
| Panemunė elderate | Vičiūnai | |
| Petrašiūnai elderate | Amaliai | |
| Petrašiūnai elderate | Naujasodis | |
| Petrašiūnai elderate | Palemonas | |
| Petrašiūnai elderate | Petrašiūnai | Pažaislis |
| Šančiai elderate | Aukštieji Šančiai | |
| Šančiai elderate | Žemieji Šančiai | |
| Šilainiai elderate | Linkuva | Maironiškiai |
| Šilainiai elderate | Milikoniai (Note: Nowadays Milikoniai and Smėliai are jointly called Šilainiai) | |
| Šilainiai elderate | Romainiai | Aukštutiniai Kaniūkai, Vijūkai |
| Šilainiai elderate | Sargėnai | Vytėnai |
| Šilainiai elderate | Smėliai | |
| Vilijampolė elderate | Lampėdžiai | |
| Vilijampolė elderate | Panerys | |
| Vilijampolė elderate | Veršvai | Žemutiniai Kaniūkai |
| Vilijampolė elderate | Vilijampolė | |
| Žaliakalnis elderate | Kalniečiai | |
| Žaliakalnis elderate | Žaliakalnis | |
