= Ninth Fort massacres of November 1941 =

Genocidal killings of nearly 5,000 Jews by German death squads during the Holocaust

Ninth Fort massacres, November 1941
- Location: Ninth Fort, Kaunas, Generalbezirk Litauen
- Date: 25 & 29 November 1941
- Incident type: Mass shootings, deportation without due process
- Perpetrators: Karl Jäger and others
- Organizations: Einsatzgruppen and others
- Victims: 4,934 German and Austrian Jewish men, women, and children.
- Survivors: 0 known
- Documentation: Jäger Report
- Memorials: In museum on site
- Notes: First systematic massacres of German Jews during the Holocaust.

The Ninth Fort massacres of November 1941 were two separate mass shootings of 4,934 German Jews in the Ninth Fort near Kaunas, Lithuania. These were the first systematic mass killings of German Jews during the Holocaust. The question of where these killings fit into the development of the Final Solution is a matter of dispute among historians.

== Background ==
In September 1941, the German dictator Adolf Hitler decided that the 300,000 Jews of German, Austrian or Czech nationality should be deported from Germany by the end of the year. These Jews were sometimes referred to as the Reich Jews. Heinrich Himmler and Reinhard Heydrich were given the task of organizing the deportation. From 15 October 1941, when the deportations first began, until 21 February 1942, Himmler and Heydrich were able to deport 58,000 people from the Reich, mostly Jews but 5,000 Gypsies were also included. These deportations were effected by 59 transport trains, each carrying almost exactly 1,000 persons. A considerable amount of bureaucratic work was necessary to designate which Jews would be deported, arrange for their transport, and seize what property they might leave behind. Transported Jews were required to declare their assets and abandon almost everything of value.

While concentration camps had been in existence in Germany for some time, in September 1941, no death camps had been constructed. The destinations for these trains were instead to be several ghettos in which the Nazis had confined the Jews of Eastern Europe, whom they called the Ostjuden.

== Trains rerouted to Kaunas ==
Originally the ghettos of Riga, Lodz, and Minsk were to receive the Reich Jews. In particular, it was planned to send 25 trains to Riga. There had been some reluctance on the part of the Reichskommissariat Ostland headquarters in Riga, headed by Hinrich Lohse, to having to find accommodation for 25,000 Jews. This and other issues related to the treatment of Jews in the northern part of the Nazi-occupied Soviet territory, caused Lohse and his deputy Otto Drechsler to become embroiled in a dispute with Franz Walter Stahlecker, commander of the Einsatzgruppe A, who favored a more rapid policy of radical extermination. On 8 November 1941, Stahlecker informed Lohse's staff in Riga that five of the 25 trains bound for Riga would go instead to the Kaunas Ghetto in Generalbezirk Litauen, as German occupied Lithuania was then known. Stahlecker did not state which of the 25 trains would be rerouted. On 20 November 1941, Rudolf Lange, another Einsatzgruppe commander, informed Lohse's administration that it would in fact be the first five trains that would be rerouted to Kaunas. By this time, some of the trains were already en route. They had left from Munich, Berlin, Frankfurt am Main, Vienna, and Breslau between 13 and 23 November.

== Massacres ==
Karl Jäger was the head of Einsatzkommando 3, a sub-unit of Einsatzgruppe A. Under his command, Einsatzkommando 3 took everyone off the trains after their arrival to the Ninth Fort, where, shortly after arrival, the Einsatzkommando shot them all. There were two separate shootings, on 25 November and on 29 November. In the 25 November shooting, 1,159 men, 1,600 women, and 175 children were killed (resettlers from Berlin, Munich and Frankfurt). In the 29 November shooting, 693 men, 1,155 women, and 152 children were killed (resettlers from Vienna and Breslau). It is not known who issued the orders for the murders of these people.

== Significance ==
By November 1941, the Nazi regime had murdered very large numbers of people in mass shooting incidents, and the murder of 5,000 people, including large number of children, in two days would not have been unusual for the Einsatzgruppen. However, until the November massacres at the Ninth Fort, no Reich Jews had been killed in such massacres.

Some Nazis who were quite willing to kill Ostjuden hesitated when it came to the Reich Jews.

Important issues related to the Ninth Fort November killings remain in dispute among historians. In particular, it is unknown why Himmler should have (belatedly) objected to the murder of 1,000 Reich Jews at Riga on 30 November, when he apparently said nothing about the killings of 5,000 Reich Jews at the Ninth Fort on 25 and 29 November.
