= Seventh Fort =

Fort in Kaunas, Lithuania

Coordinates: 54.916°N 23.927°E

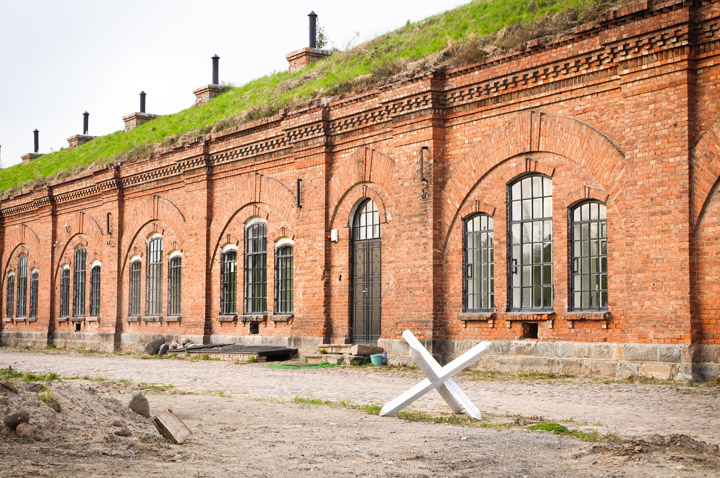
Barracks of the Seventh Fort

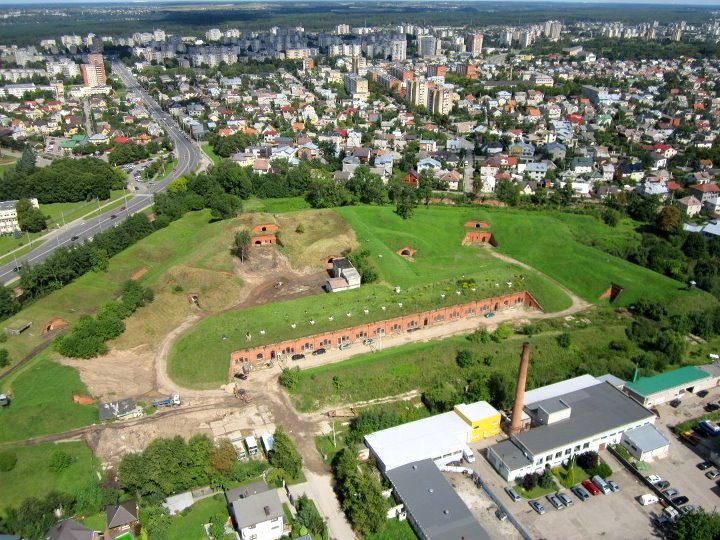
Aerial view of the fort in 2011

The Seventh Fort or VII Fort is a defensive fortification built in Žaliakalnis district of Kaunas, Lithuania, during implementation of the first phase of the construction of the Kaunas Fortress. It is located near the Hospital of Lithuanian University of Health Sciences. This Fort became the last brick fortification of Kaunas Fortress. The Seventh Fort is close to the central defenses and it is located in the rear of Kaunas Fortress. The first owner of fort was the 11th company of Kaunas Fortress Artillery (Imperial Russian Army). In 1915, German Army occupied the Fort without resistance. The Seventh Fort is one of the best surviving examples of a two-rampart fort, showing the typical design of a 19th-century Russian brick fort. Many authentic elements survive, such as iron window frames, ammunition warehouse gate fragments. During the Fort's restoration, a number of authentic interior details (interior decoration, paving, fittings of ammunition storage doors and gate) were found.

== Layout ==
The fort project was prepared by Military Engineers Board of the Russian Empire in 1882, while modifying a typical design of two-rampart brick fort of 1879. The contract for the construction of the Seventh Fort was signed on 7 July 1883 between the contractor reserve lieutenant colonel Nikolay Shevtsov and Fortress Engineering Board. The Fort construction was completed around 1890. All buildings of the fort are typical fortification buildings of red brickwork with vaulted overlays, resistant to 8-inch projectile hits. The largest buildings are the barracks with the central postern. The Fort had two armories in faces, two armories in flanks and one central armory, four gun shelters, two riflemen galleries in the rear corners of the fort, and a defensive ditch. From all sides, except the rear, the fort was surrounded by a counterscarp wall and glacis behind it.

== Artillery ==
The Seventh Fort was armed with eight 6-inch caliber 1877 model guns, twenty light (87 mm caliber) cannons, four copper 6-inch caliber mortars, and two Maxim machine guns. For the protection of the Fort's defensive ditch, nine lightweight 87 mm caliber cannons on Nasvetevich gun carriages and four 57 mm Nordenfeld cannon systems on the casemate gun carriages were installed on the fort's caponiers and semi-caponier. More than 15,000 different caliber shells and 300,000 rounds were stored in five ammunition warehouses.

During World War I, 6-inch 45 caliber Canet gun was installed near the Fort, which successfully fired at the enemy's trenches in Germaniškiai village area.

== Interwar period ==
A company of the Lithuanian Army was located in the fort since 1919. The goal of this temporary unit was adoption of military assets left by Germans for needs of the newly established Lithuanian Army. In 1924, newly created Lithuanian Central Archive and Military Archive moved to the fort. The military barracks were re-purposed for civilian archives by a Lithuanian interwar architect Vladimiras Dubeneckis. Interior partitions in the former fort kitchen on the right wing of the barracks were removed to create the office of archive's director. A cellar was excavated to house a boiler room of the central heating system underneath the casemate near central corridor of the barracks. Although the fort was adapted for civilian use, it still maintained a regime of a closed military object: to enter the fort territory one had to obtain authorization from the army.

== World War II ==
The Seventh Fort was the first concentration camp in Nazi-occupied territories after the beginning of the war with the Soviet Union. German orders to concentrate the Jews of Lithuania into a separate camp were received on 29 June 1941. The next day, the decision had been made during the meeting of the Lithuanian Provisional Government to set up a Jewish concentration camp in the Seventh Fort. There had been appointed a newly formed Lithuanian partisan groupTautinio Darbo Apsaugos Batalionas (known as TDA) for camp protection and murder of its prisoners. SS-Standartenführer Karl Jäger, commander of Einsatzkommando 3, was in charge of the prisoners and their executions. Up to 5,000 victims were killed in the fort's territory from 30 June 1941 until its closure on 10 August 1941. The remaining prisoners were transferred to Kaunas Ghetto. Most of them were Jewish residents of Kaunas. The largest number of victims were killed on 4 July (463 people) and 6 July (2514 people). Murdered bodies were thrown into the hole left from the half-caponier. Later other victims had been buried there too, near the fort wall. Main perpetrators of the bloody massacre were TDA battalion officers, together with their subordinates. The famous people among the victims were rabbi Elchonon Wasserman (1875–1941) and Lithuanian poet Vytautas Montvila (1902–1941).

Starting September 1941, the Seventh Fort become a concentration camp for prisoners of war known as Stalag 336 or Stalag 336 F. Initially, the camp housed war prisoners of the Ukrainian nationality. There is evidence that about 1,500 Ukrainian prisoners died from the cold, diseases, and malnutrition in the winter of 1941 to 1942. The exact number of war prisoners dead and buried at the Seventh Fort is unknown. The fort was also used to train German auxiliary personnel (Hilfswilliger).

== Soviet period ==
Former barracks, headquarters and warehouses of the fortress were used by Soviet Army regiments. Forts had been turned into storage of the war reserve and soldier deployment places. Pioneer unit engaged in restoration of bridges blown during World War II was based in the Seventh Fort. Later, the fort were transferred to the 29th Voentorg (military supply) of the Baltic Military District. Warehouses and Voentorg administration were located in the fort barracks and powder cellars. During this period, the historic fort suffered much damage: the defensive ditch was filed with trash and dirt, building facades were damaged, drainage system was destroyed, left artillery yard was paved with asphalt, garages for auto vehicles storage were built.

== Independent Lithuania ==
After the Russian Army left Lithuania in 1993, the Seventh Fort was transferred to the Lithuanian National Defence Volunteer Forces (KASP). There, three companies of the 22nd KASP Battalion were deployed from 1993 to 2007. The Lithuanian government decided to sell the fort as did not find the use to it after discontinue of this battalion.

Fort's reconstruction was started in spring 2009 when Lithuanian non-profit organization Military Heritage Centre became the owner of the Seventh Fort. One of the first projects carried out in the fort was scientific and field research, restoration of casemates, and removal of asphalt paving. Additionally, low-value garages were demolished, drainage system was restored which allowed the rear caponier to become accessible once again.

The Seventh Fort opened its gates to the visitors in spring 2011 for the first time in its history. The same year, graves of the genocide victims were found in the right wing of the fort. The site was cleaned of plants and trash and a memorial route was created. Since 2012, the Seventh Fort is a member of the Lithuanian Museum Association. There are created expositions of Kaunas Fortress history and artillery evolution in the barrack casemates. There are organized tours, school educational programs and various topics events intended to remember important events of Lithuanian history in the fort.

== Literature ==
- Vytautas Petrikėnas, Martynas Kosas, "VII fortas: lietuviška tragedija. Pirmosios Lietuvoje koncentracijos stovyklos istorija". Kaunas, Arx reklama, 2011. ISBN 978-609-95321-5-8
- Vladimir Orlov, "Kauno tvirtovės istorija. 1882–1915". Kaunas, Arx Baltica, 2007. ISBN 978-9955-638-97-1
- Vladimir Orlov, "The Atlas of Kaunas fortress". Kaunas, Arx Baltica, 2009. ISBN 978-9955-39-080-0
