= Ninth Fort memorial =

Monument to Jews killed at Fort IX in Kaunas

Coordinates: 54°56′38″N 23°52′4″E

Ninth Fort memorial is a memorial designed by the Lithuanian sculptor Alfonsas Vincentas Ambraziūnas and unveiled in 1984. It commemorates the victims of the Ninth Fort, a Nazi execution site for the Jews in the Kovno Ghetto.

The monument is 105 feet (32 m) high. The mass burial place of the victims of the massacres carried out in the fort is a grass field, marked by a simple yet frankly worded memorial written in several languages. It reads, "This is the place where Nazis and their assistants killed more than 30,000 Jews from Lithuania and other European countries."

On 11 April 2011, the memorial to the victims of Nazism was vandalized — the memorial tombstones were knocked down, and white swastikas were spray-painted on the memorial. On the adjacent sidewalk, the words “Juden raus” (German: Jews Out) were inscribed.
