= Šilainiai =

Coordinates: 54°56′09″N 23°51′33″E

- Eldership
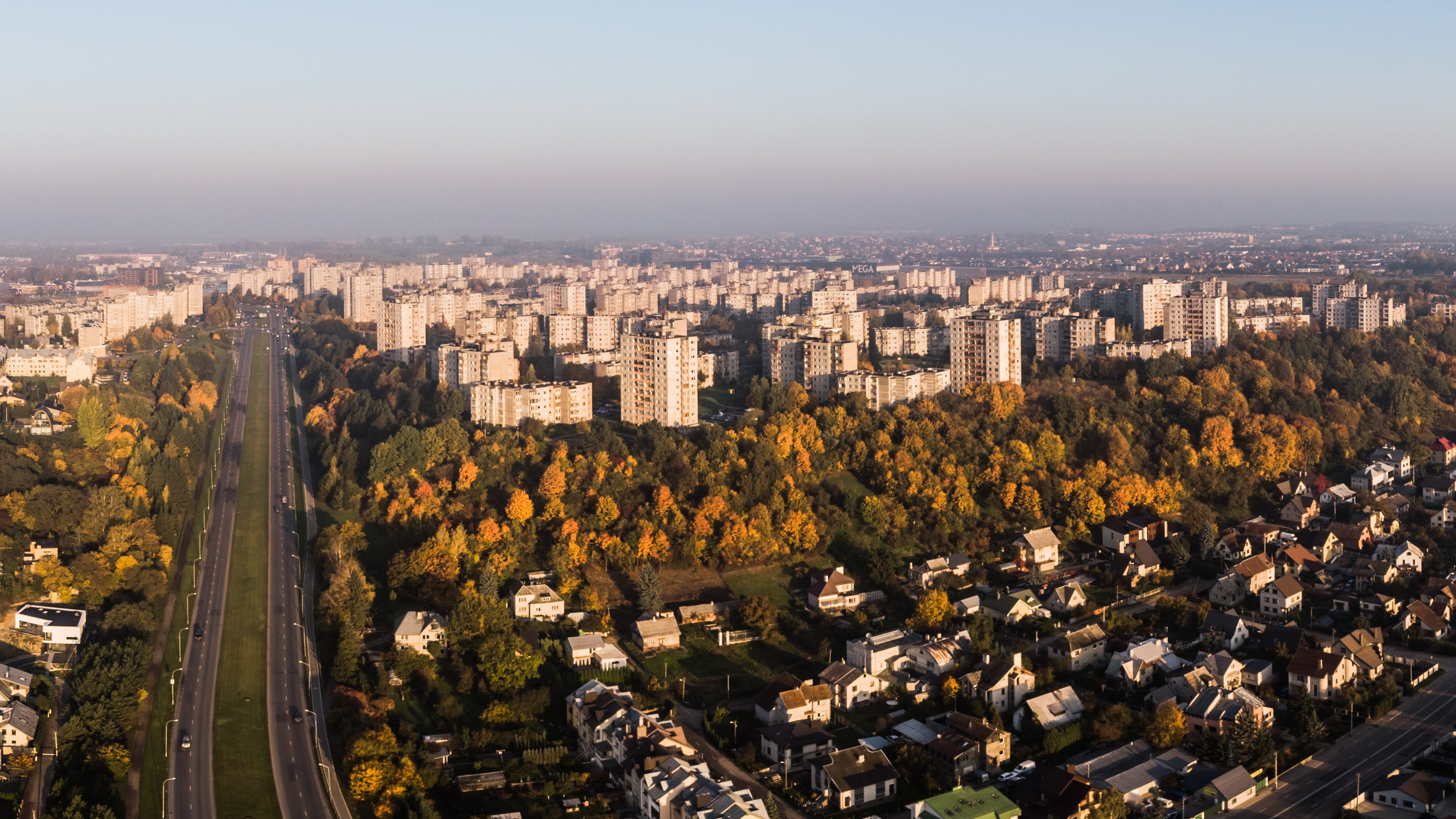
- Bird's-eye view of Šilainiai district

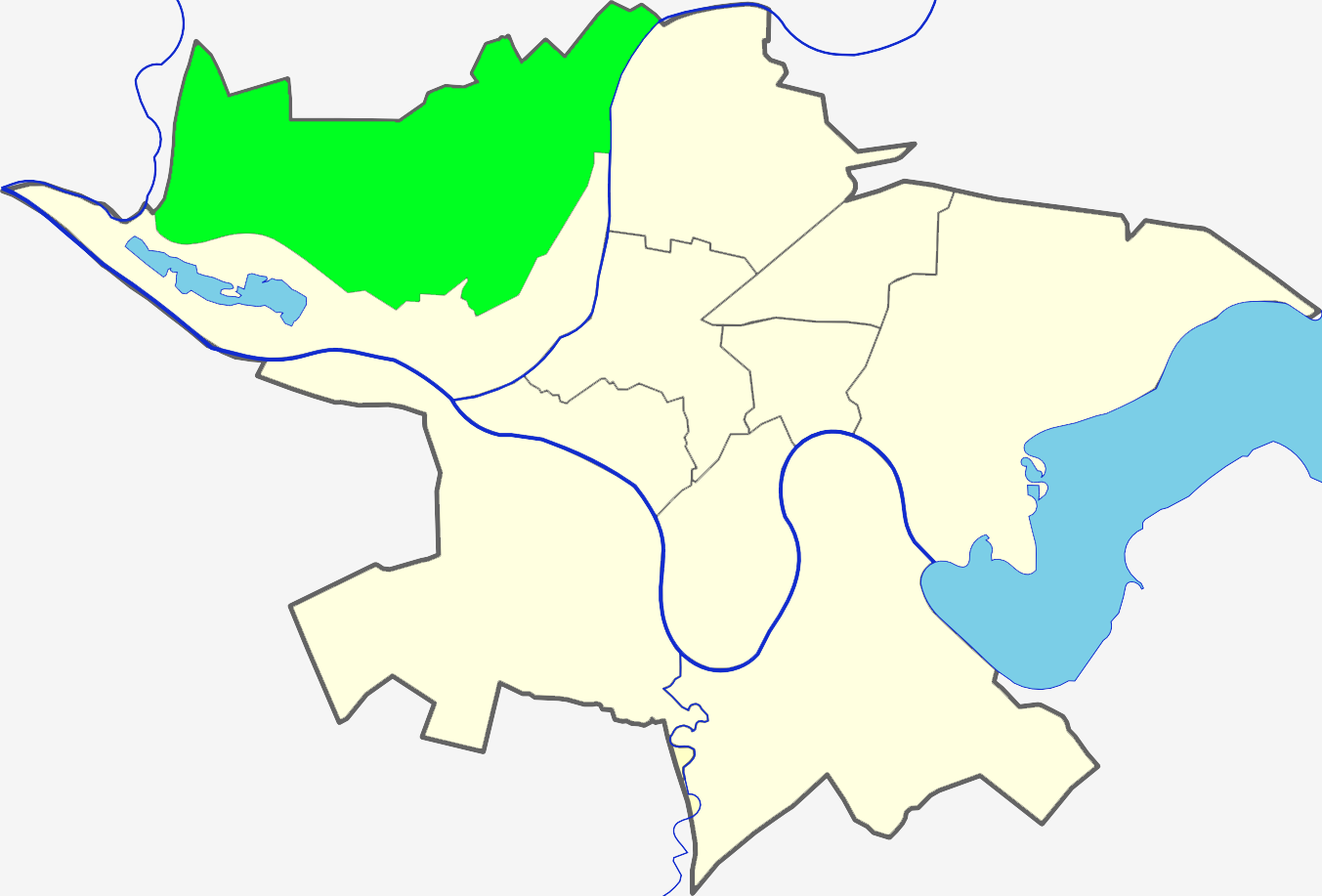
- Location of Šilainiai within Kaunas
- Country: Lithuania
- County: Kaunas County
- Municipality: Kaunas city municipality

Area
  - Total: 25.3 km^{2} (9.8 sq mi)

Population (2021)
  - Total: 55,125
  - Density: 2,180/km^{2} (5,640/sq mi)
- Time zone: UTC+2 (EET)
  - Summer (DST): UTC+3 (EEST)

Šilainiai is a neighborhood in the Lithuanian city of Kaunas, consisting of mostly Soviet-built microdistricts completed in the 1980s. Part of larger Šilainiai elderate which is one of the largest elderates in the city, consisting of Milikoniai, Sargėnai, Šilainiai, Vytėnai and Romainiai neighborhoods, covering 25 km^{2} and housing over 55,000 people as of 2021. Eighth and Ninth Forts of the Kaunas Fortress are located in the elderate.

There are several shopping malls, post offices, drug stores, book shops, Šilainiai hospital, Kaunas Holy Spirit Church and Chapel of Saint John Paul II. Near the elderate of Šilainiai, remains of historical estate of Linkuva, Vytėnai and Sargėnai can be found.

== Schools ==
The elderate is home to three gymnasiums (Santaros, Jonas Basanavičius and Juozas Grušas Arts Gymnasium), and three secondary schools (Milikoniai, Tadas Ivanauskas and Ąžuolas Catholic Secondary School).
