= Alfonsas Ambraziūnas =

Lithuanian sculptor (1933–2020)

Alfonsas Vincentas Ambraziūnas (12 May 1933 – 7 May 2020) was a Lithuanian sculptor known for designing the memorial sculpture at the Ninth Fort.
