= Romainiai =

Kaunas city part

Coordinates: 54.934°N 23.822°E

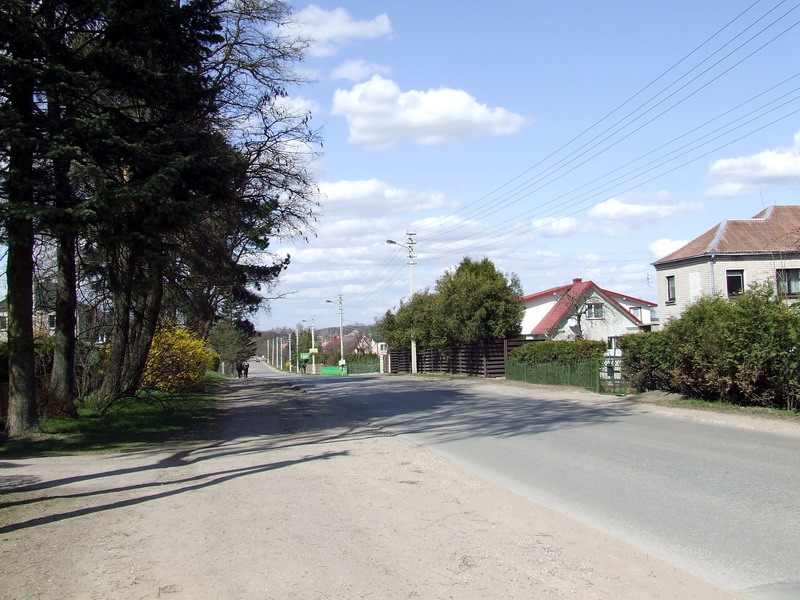
Romaniai Street, 2100

Romainiai is a city part (miesto dalys) in the northwestern part of Kaunas, Lithuania, north of Lampėdžiai. It is part of the Šilainiai elderate (since 2000).

Romaniai lies by the Romaniai Street within the Romaniai forest park. To the east of Romaniai forest there is the Linkuva forest and the Šilainiai forest to the west.

== History ==
Romaniai was first mentioned in the 14th century in the Teutonic Order chronicles. It was annexed to Kaunas in 1997.

== See also ==
- Subdivisions of Kaunas
