= Kaunas Fortress =

Fortress complex in Kaunas, Lithuania

Coordinates: 54.8989°N 23.8854°E

- Lithuania
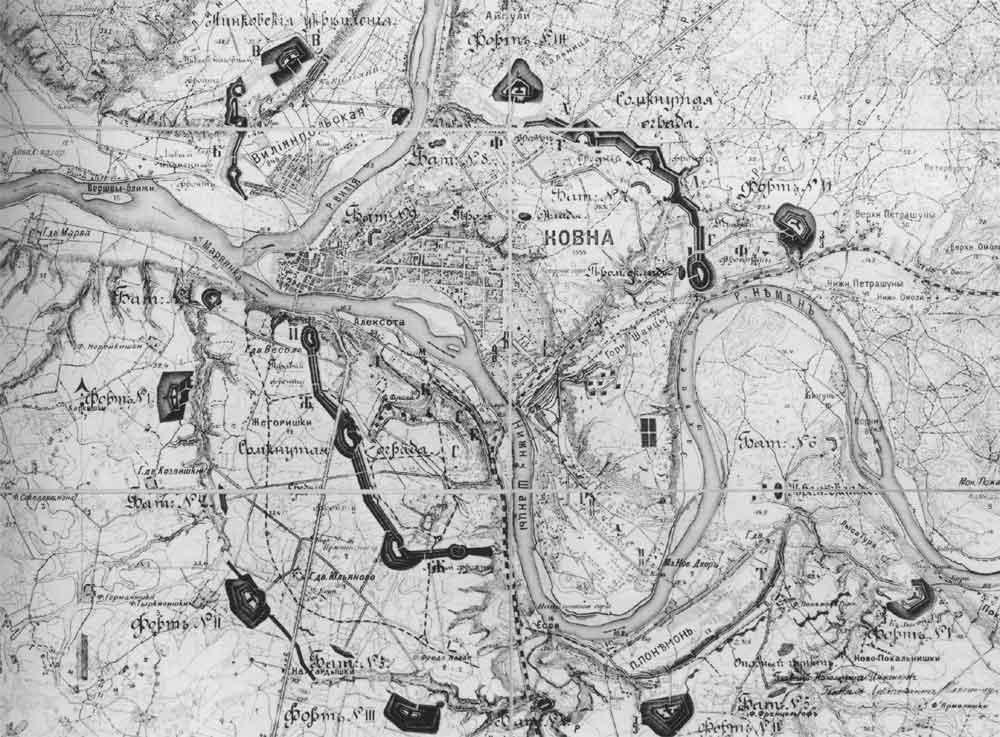
- Fortress plan from the 19th century

Site information
- Controlled by: (Russia) Russian Empire (1882–1915); German Empire (1915–18); Lithuania (1918–40, 1990–present); Soviet Union (1940–41, 1944–90); Nazi Germany (1941–1944)

Site history
- Built: 19th–20th centuries
- In use: 1882–present
- Materials: Bricks, reinforced concrete
- Battles/wars: World War I World War II

Kaunas Fortress (Lithuanian: Kauno tvirtovė, Russian: Кοвенская крепость, German: Festung Kowno) is the remains of a fortress complex in Kaunas, Lithuania. It was constructed and renovated between 1882 and 1915 to protect the Russian Empire's western borders, and was designated a "first-class" fortress in 1887. During World War I, the complex was the largest defensive structure in the entire state, occupying 65 km^{2} (25 mi^{2}).

The fortress was battle-tested in 1915 when Germany attacked the Russian Empire, and withstood eleven days of assault before capture. After World War I, the fortress' military importance declined as advances in weaponry rendered it increasingly obsolete. It was used by various civil institutions and as a garrison.

During World War II, parts of the fortress complex were used by the Nazi Germany for detention, interrogation, and execution. About 50,000 people were executed there, including more than 30,000 Jewish victims of the Holocaust. Some sections have since been restored; the Ninth Fort houses a museum and memorial devoted to the Jewish victims of Holocaust mass executions. The complex is the most complete remaining example of a Russian Empire fortress.

== Background ==
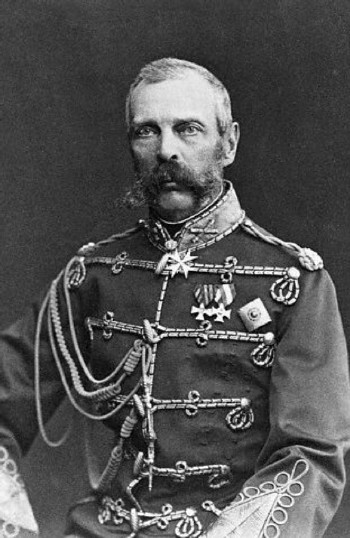
An 1879 edict issued by Tsar Alexander II ordered the construction of Kaunas Fortress

The city of Kaunas is located at the confluence of two rivers, the Neman and Neris, which link Lithuania's interior and its capital, Vilnius, to the Baltic Sea. The Baltic peoples had created significant domains by the 1st century, and came into conflict with the Scandinavians and the Slavs; the Teutonic Order began targeting Lithuanian lands at the beginning of the 13th century. Since Lithuania was heavily wooded and its lands were often impassable, its interior was most approachable along its rivers when frozen and during the short dry harvest season in late summer. In response to this vulnerability, defensive structures, including a brick castle in Kaunas, were in place at various points on the Nemunas River by the 14th century. The city was first mentioned in written sources in 1361; it received Magdeburg rights, regulating its autonomy and establishing trade protocols, from Vytautas the Great in 1408. An outpost of the Hanseatic League was created there in 1441. By the end of the 16th century Kaunas had become a major regional trade center, but plagues, fires, and wars adversely affected the country and city during the 17th and 18th centuries. Following the partitions of the Polish–Lithuanian Commonwealth at the end of the 18th century, Lithuania was incorporated into the Russian Empire. Two major 19th century projects contributed to the city's revival. The Augustów Canal, completed in 1832, linked the Neman to the Black Sea, and a rail line linking Saint Petersburg, Warsaw, and Germany via Kaunas was completed in 1862; it was part of a limited network of western Russian railways.

Russia's western borders needed support, and fortresses existed or were being built in Latvia, Ukraine, and Belarus. The concept of building a fortress in Lithuania was discussed without result in 1796, but became a critical concern after the French invasion of Russia in 1812 led by Napoleon. The Grande Armée managed to cross the Nemunas near Kaunas on its drive towards Moscow without major difficulties. An increasingly unified Germany troubled the Empire during the second half of the century. A fortress in Kaunas would present an obstacle to attacks from the west, preventing further incursions towards Riga and Vilnius. In order to control the region, attackers would need to first neutralize Kaunas. Facing this possibility and evaluating the natural advantages of the city, Russian officials decided to construct a fortress there. After several delays, on July 7, 1879 Tsar Alexander II issued an edict ordering its construction.

== Construction ==
Construction of the Kaunas Fortress	Batteries									Forts								
Construction of the Kaunas Fortress	I	II	III	IV	V	VI	VII	VIII	IX	I	II	III	IV	V	VI	VII	VIII	IX
Start of construction	1882	1883	1883	1884	1884	1883	1884	1883	1883	1883	1883	1883	1883	1883	1883	1884	1890	1903
End of construction	1889	1888	1888	1888	1888	1888	1888	1888	1888	1889	1888	1889	1888	1889	1889	1889	~1907	1911

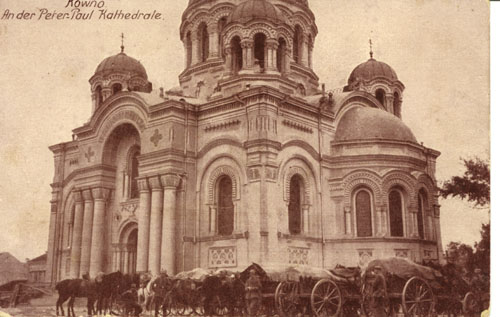
The Garrison Church was constructed for the fortress garrison

The first design was overseen by Generals Nikolay Obruchev, Konstantin Zverev, and Ivan Volberg. As originally planned, the fortress encompassed a huge site, consisting of seven forts and nine defensive batteries arranged in concentric loops. The plan included support buildings and infrastructures, such as barracks, new roads, and an ammunition depot. Construction began in 1882; about 4,000 workers were mustered for the project. The principal structures were concentrated in Freda, Panemunė, Aleksotas, and the new section of the city. The project significantly affected the daily life of Kaunas residents, and there were plans to detach the fortress into an independent administrative unit governed by a military board; its commandant wrote that "There is no city of Kaunas, there is only the Fortress of Kaunas."

The first forts were built using bricks reinforced with thick ramparts of earth, which were incorporated into the surrounding relief, making them harder to breach. They were symmetrical, usually having five faces, with positions for infantry and artillery. These forts were built according to the standard Russian brick fort design of the time. Therefore, the first seven forts were very similar; they differed only in the layout of their interiors, their integration into the surrounding relief, and in some construction details. They would also be renovated in slightly different ways. Batteries were built between adjacent forts; these were fortifications containing various types of artillery, located along the fortress' outer lines and usually erected on the hills. The first construction phase was completed in 1887. The fortress was designated first-class in that year, marking its importance and defensive capabilities, and Otto Klem was named its first commandant. At the same time, administrative rules were established to manage the fortress' impact on the city and its surrounding areas; the height of the fortress' civil buildings was restricted.

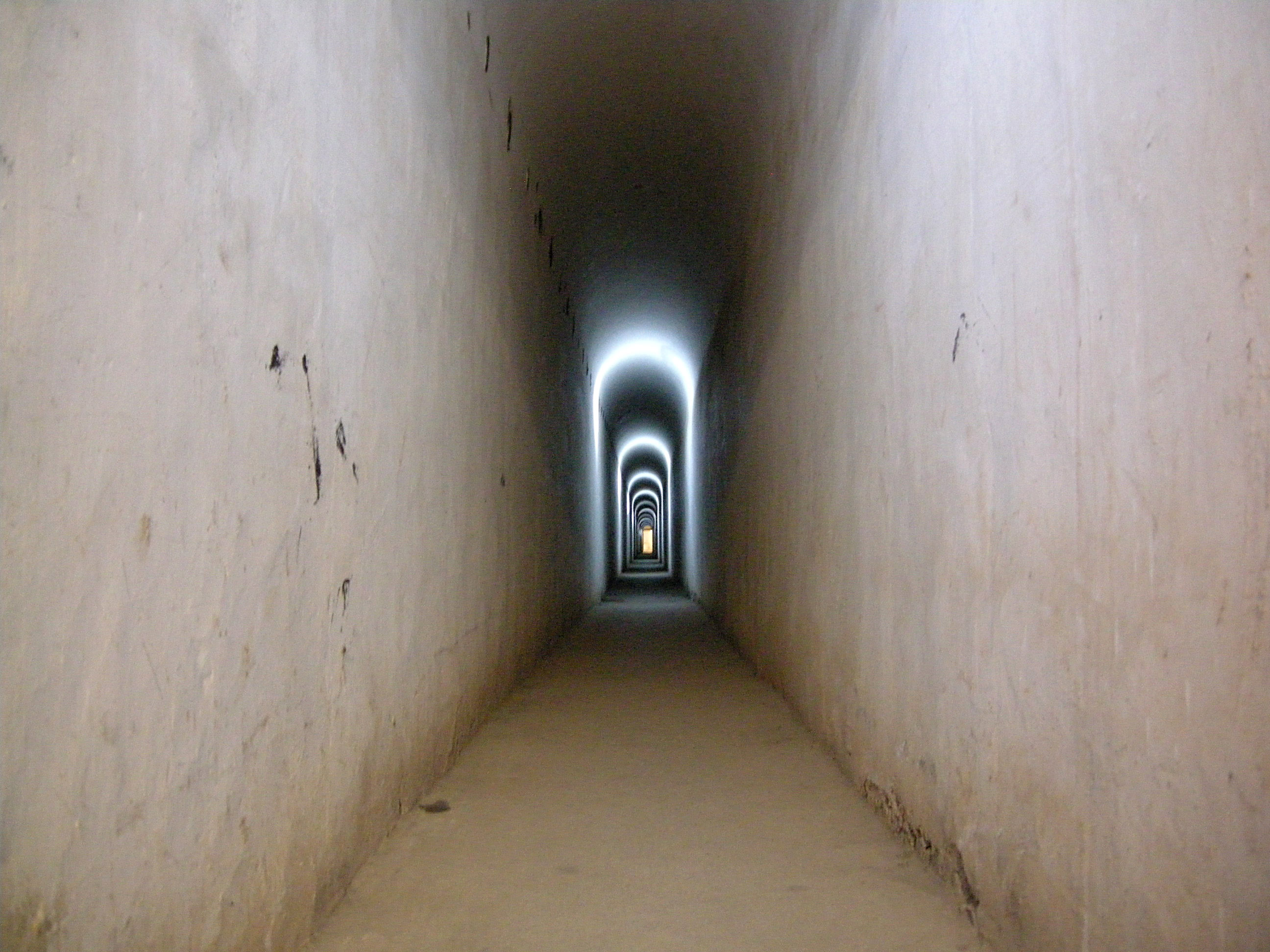
One of the longest tunnels in the Ninth Fort

During 1890 work began on the Eighth fort, known as Linkuva; new construction techniques were introduced, particularly reinforced concrete. The Linkuva fort became the most modern entrenchment, equipped with electricity, sewerage, and casemates for a garrison of 1,000 personnel. At the same time, massive groundworks were laid along with additional defensive structures, effecting the complete enclosure of the city center between the Rivers Nemunas and Neris. By 1890, seven forts had been completed, supporting roads had been constructed, and a railroad bridge over the Nemunas had been adapted for military transport. By now, expenditures on the fortress had amounted to over nine million rubles. The first bricks for a church that would serve the garrison were laid in 1891; it was completed in 1893. The following year construction began on a dedicated narrow gauge railway.

The Ninth Fort, begun in 1903, was the first of its kind in the Empire. The structure was a trapezoid, encompassing one infantry rampart, and was equipped with two armored watchtowers, electricity, and ventilation. The walls of its cannon casemates were covered with cork to reduce firing noise. The cost of this single fort was 850,000 rubles.

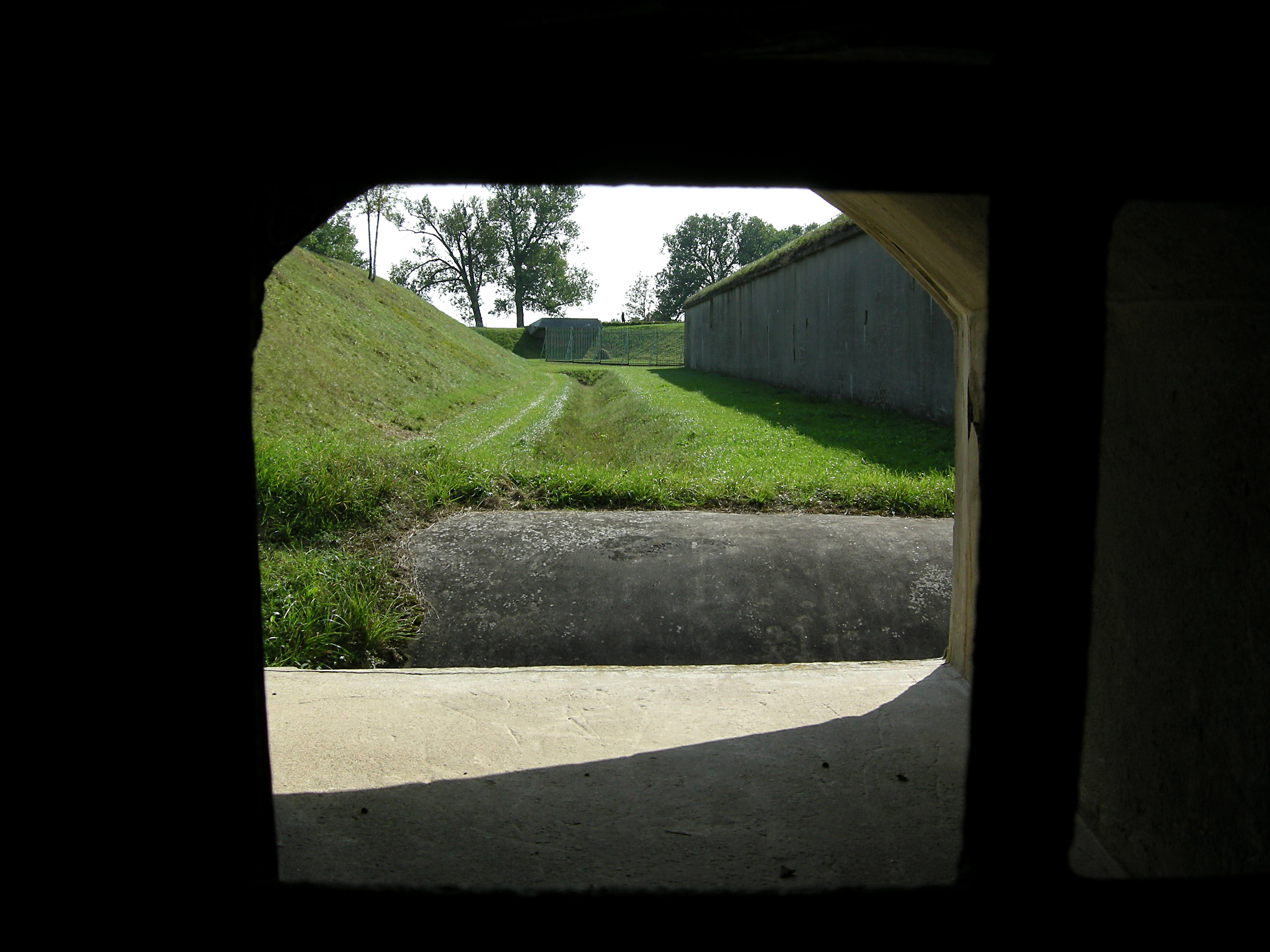
Shooting embrasure for cannons

The complex of forts and defensive structures was divided into four sectors. The first followed the left bank of the Nemunas to its confluence with the Jiesia River and included the three earliest forts. The second sector extended from the Jiesia to Pažaislis monastery and included two forts. The third extended from the right to the left bank of the Nemunas; this sector also contained two forts. The fourth and last sector stretched from the right bank of the Neris to the left bank of the Nemunas, comprising two forts, including the newest – the Ninth Fort.

As new building and weapons technologies developed, the fortress was repeatedly renovated in order to maintain its military effectiveness. In 1912 an expansion and reconstruction initiative was launched. This project called for twelve new forts along with batteries, support buildings, and defensive structures. Its completion was scheduled for 1917. The older forts were to be completely encircled by the new construction, which was meant to employ the newest military technologies. During the early realization of the plan, new defensive entrenchments were built and the old forts were strengthened with concrete. However, when action began on the Eastern Front during World War I, work on the fortress was halted. In 1915 only one fort, the Ninth, conformed with the new technological criteria, while the Tenth Fort was only partially built. The complex then covered about 65 km^{2} (25 mi^{2}) and contained a 30 km (19 mi) internal railway, power plant, water supply system, mill, bakery, brewery, food bank, and telegraph. Despite the fact that the fortress' renovations and new construction had not been finished, it presented a formidable challenge to its attackers.

== Interwar ==
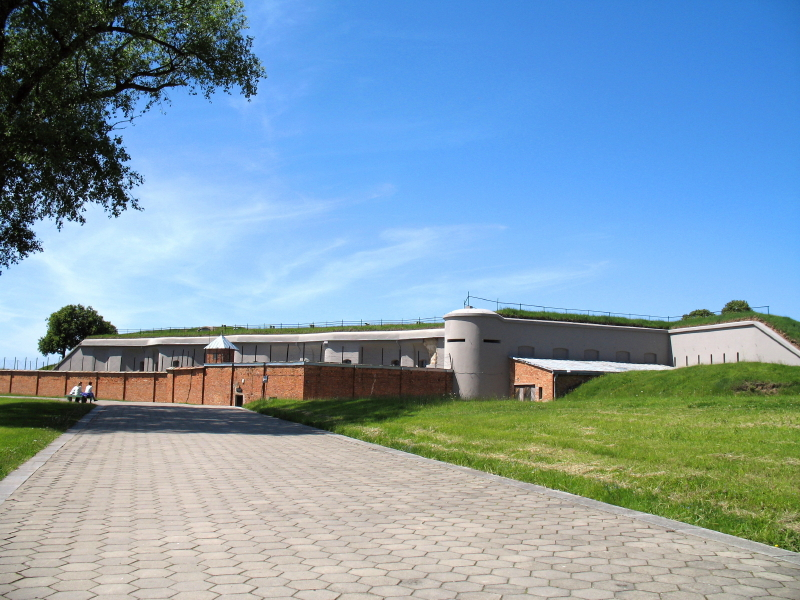
Reconstructed Ninth Fort

Lithuania regained its independence on February 16, 1918 and the old fortress was placed under engineering staff supervision. Those materials that had not been taken by the Germans were used to resupply Lithuanian military needs, and for the construction of the armored train Gediminas, named after the 14th century Grand Duke of Lithuania Gediminas. In 1920, the Kaunas Fortress Board was formed and charged with the task of administering the fortress. Due to the development of new military technologies, its reconstruction was seen as a vast and inappropriate expense. The fortress' armament was dismantled and the trenches were filled with scrap iron.

Sections of the fortress were given to various civil institutions, while the army occupied the barracks of the former 28th Division. The Sixth and Ninth forts were used as prisons and the Central Archive was located in the Seventh Fort; the Republic's official radio station was based in the fortress; a gas chamber was installed in the gunpowder depot of the First Fort and used to execute condemned prisoners. Some sections were used as housing for the poor. As the city of Kaunas expanded near the complex, its roads became public streets. The structures and layouts of the new sections were influenced by the presence of the fortress.

== World War II ==
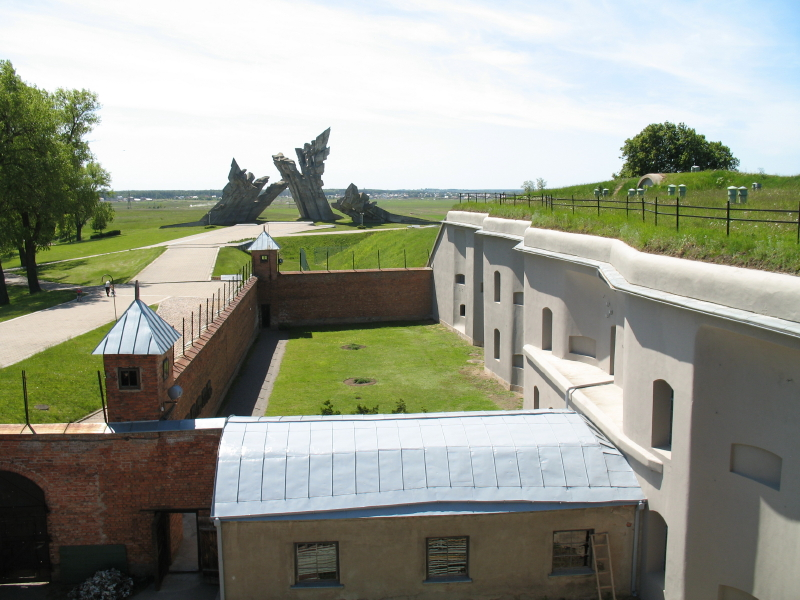
A 32 m (105 ft) tall memorial to the victims

Adjustments to the secret protocols of the 1939 Molotov–Ribbentrop Pact assigned Lithuania to the Soviet sphere of influence, and it was occupied by the USSR in June 1940. The fortress was then used to conduct interrogations and house political prisoners. The pact was broken when Germany invaded USSR on June 22, 1941. German forces entered Kaunas on June 24. The Sixth Fort became a POW camp for Red Army soldiers. Kaunas's Jewish population numbered between 35,000 and 40,000; few would survive the Holocaust in Lithuania. The Nazis, aided by Lithuanian auxiliaries, began massacring the Jewish population. On July 6, acting under orders of the SS, Lithuanian auxiliary police units shot nearly 3,000 Jews at the Seventh Fort. On August 18, in what came to be known as the "intellectuals action", over 1,800 Jews were shot at the Fourth Fort. On October 28, the "Great Action" took place—the residents of the Kaunas Ghetto were summoned, and over 9,000 men, women and children were taken to the Ninth Fort and executed. During the later course of the occupation, over 5,000 Jewish deportees from Central Europe would be executed at this fort. About 60 escaped in December 1943; they had been assigned to excavate and burn the bodies of earlier victims, as part of Aktion 1005. Thirteen of these escapees were able to document the Aktion's attempt to hide the evidence of the mass murders.

When Germany began losing the war and the battlefront approached Lithuania, the German defense began to prepare a defense in Kaunas, including the use of the fortress. The Nemunas River was labelled "the line of catastrophe", and Adolf Hitler called for its defense at any price. On August 1, 1944 Kaunas was captured by the Red Army. The remaining fortress structures were used for military needs and several of the original structures were demolished or redeveloped.

The number of deaths at the fortress during World War II vary by source; the United States Holocaust Museum gives detailed descriptions of the deaths of about 18,500 Holocaust victims. Other sources mention 30,000 Jewish deaths, with total number 50,000.

== Post-war ==
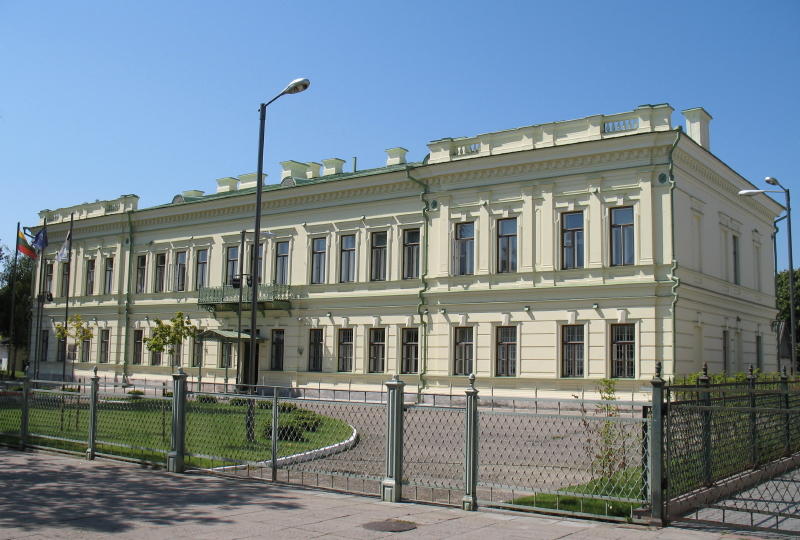
The Headquarters of the Fortress' commandant, currently housing the Headquarters of Lithuanian Air Force

Lithuania remained a Soviet Socialist Republic until 1990. In 1948, the headquarters of the 7th Guards Airborne Division was established in the fortress' commandant's headquarters. The barracks were used by the 108th Guards Parachute Regiment and the Fifth Fort served the air defense regiment. Most of the forts, however, served as depots or housed farming organizations. During the postwar expansion and development of the city, parts of the fortress were dismantled; as part of the construction of Kaunas Polytechnic Institute the ground-level entrenchments of one defensive sector were destroyed.

In 1958, the Ninth Fort was dedicated as a museum. During 1959, its first exhibition was opened, memorializing the crimes that had taken place there. The museum later expanded its scope to cover the fortress' entire history. A 32 m (105 ft) tall memorial to the victims was constructed there in 1984. However, the Soviet military occupied most of the fortress until Lithuania re-established its independence. After the withdrawal of Soviet forces, completed in 1993, Lithuanian military bases were established at several forts.

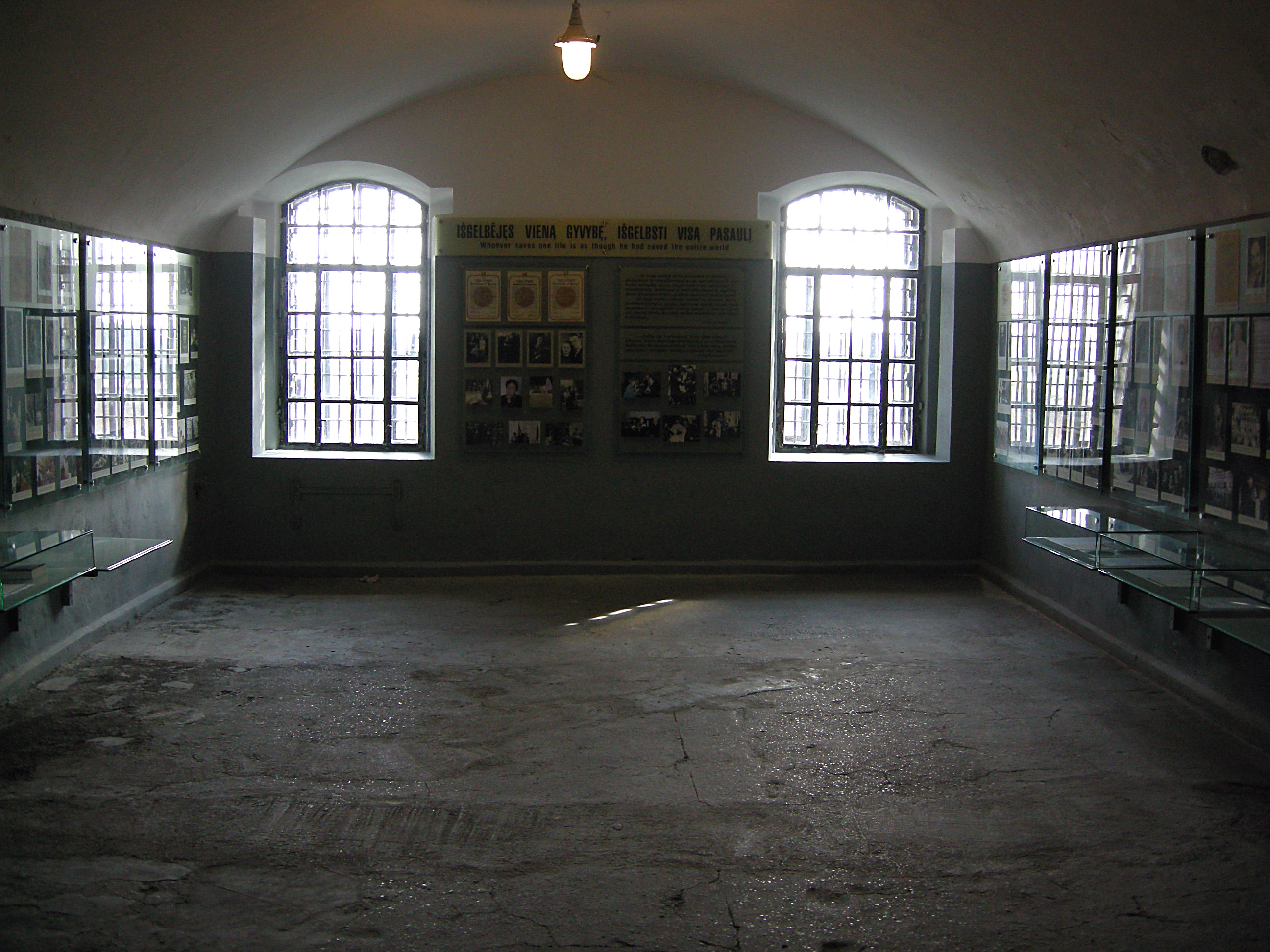
Museum in the Ninth Fort

As of early 2007, only the Ninth Fort had been partly renovated. It is now devoted to the Holocaust and Lithuania's occupations by the Germans and the Soviets. The museum, which holds over 65,000 artefacts, is sponsored by the Lithuanian Ministry of Culture. Since the early 2000s, it has received about 100,000 visitors per year and hosted Holocaust education seminars and workshops. In 2005, the international project "Baltic Culture and Tourism Route Fortresses" was launched, with support from the European Union. Its goal is the promotion of transnational scientific cooperation in monument protection, along with the creation of strategies to reconstruct and manage fortresses in the region. Kaunas Fortress is a part of this project. In 2007, Seventh fort was sold, new owners started the restoration process, since 2009 Seventh fort is open as a fortification and military museum and is the only brick fort in Kaunas suitable for safe visiting. In the 2000s, a variety of entities owned parts of the complex: the Ministry of Culture, the Ministry of Defence, the State Property Fund, and the City of Kaunas. The site still contains unexploded ordnance, although a 1995 project removed about 1.9 tonnes of explosives. Other restoration issues include uncovered wells, poor drainage and ventilation, erosion, possible chemical contaminants, vegetative overgrowth, and the presence of a protected bat colony. Despite the damage that it has sustained, the Kaunas Fortress complex is the most complete of the surviving Russian Empire fortresses.

== Bibliography ==
- Anušauskas, Arvydas; Bauža, Česlovas; Banionis, Juozas; Brandišauskas, Valentinas; Bubnys, Arūnas; Jakubčionis, Algirdas; Jonušauskas, Laurynas; Kuodytė, Dalia; Maslauskienė, Nijolė; Stankeras, Petras; Starkauskas, Juozas; Streikus, Arūnas; Tininis, Vytautas; Truska, Liudas (2007), Lietuva 1940–1990: okupuotos Lietuvos istorija (in Lithuanian), Kaunas, p. 712, ISBN 978-9955-601-47-0
- Cornish, Nik; Karachtchouk, Andrei (2001), The Russian Army 1914–18, Osprey Publishing, p. 48, ISBN 978-9955-638-97-1
- Gitelman, Zvi (1997), Bitter Legacy: Confronting the Holocaust in the USSR, Indiana: Indiana University Press, p. 332, ISBN 0-253-33359-8
- Orlov, Vladimir (2007), Kauno tvirtovės istorija (in Lithuanian), Kaunas: Arx Baltica, p. 160, ISBN 978-9955-638-97-1
- Frucht, Richard (2005), Eastern Europe: An Introduction to the People, Lands, and Culture, ABC-CLIO, p. 928, ISBN 1-57607-800-0
- Kviklys, Bronius (1991), Mūsų Lietuva (in Lithuanian), vol. II, Vilnius: Mintis, p. 752, ISBN 978-9955-638-97-1
- Millett, Allan (1987), Military Effectiveness, Routledge, p. 385, ISBN 0-04-445053-2
- Mearsheimer, John (2001), The Tragedy of Great Power Politics, W. W. Norton & Company, p. 555, ISBN 0-393-02025-8
- Pociūnas, Arvydas (2008), Kauno tvirtovės gynyba 1915 metais (PDF) (in Lithuanian), Vilnius: Generolo Jono Žemaičio Lietuvos karo akademija, p. 186, ISBN 978-9955-423-64-5
- Rowell, S.C. (1994), Lithuania Ascending: A Pagan Empire Within East-central Europe, 1295-1345, Cambridge: Cambridge University Press, p. 375, ISBN 0-521-45011-X
- Zinkus, Jonas (1979), Lietuviškoji tarybinė enciklopedija (in Lithuanian), vol. V, Vilnius: Vyriausioji enciklopedijų redakcija, p. 754, OCLC 20017802
