= Ninth Fort =

Historic fort in Šilainiai elderate, Kaunas, Lithuania

Coordinates: 54°56′41″N 23°52′14″E

External image
- Mass grave at the Ninth Fort by George Kadish

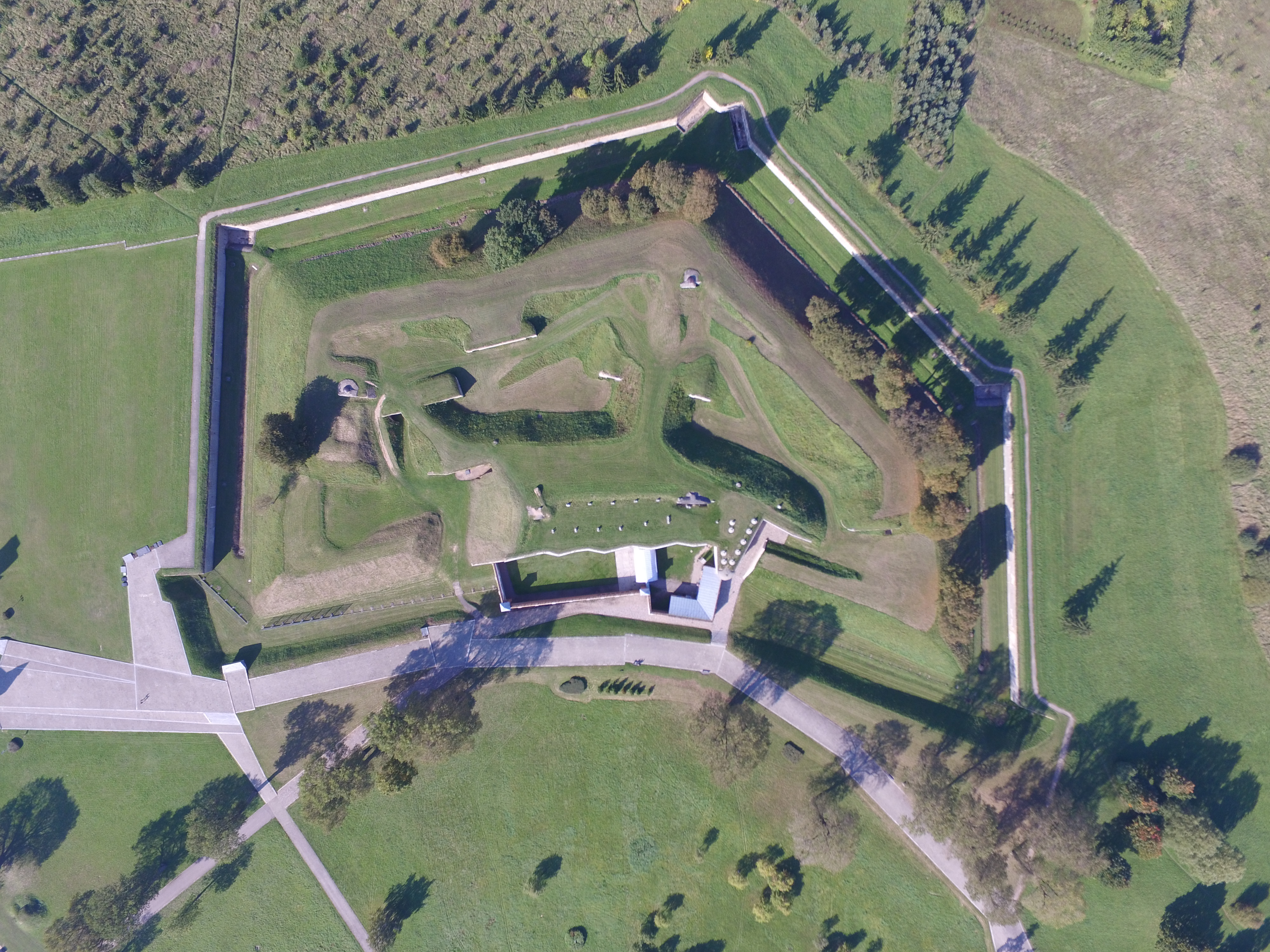
Aerial view of the Ninth Fort

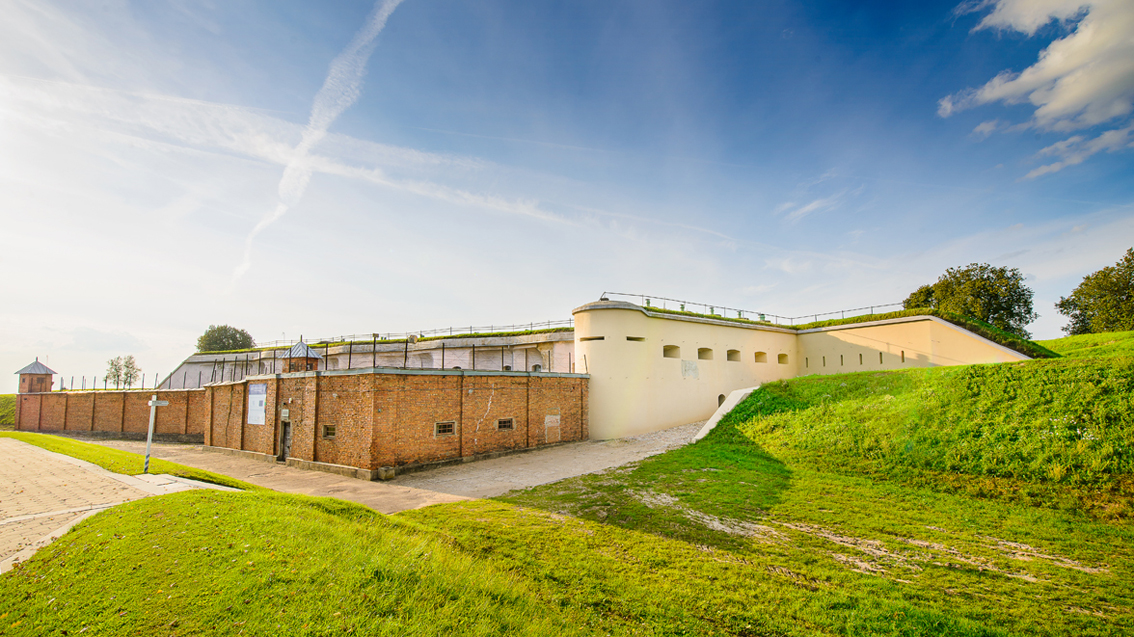
Reconstructed Ninth Fort

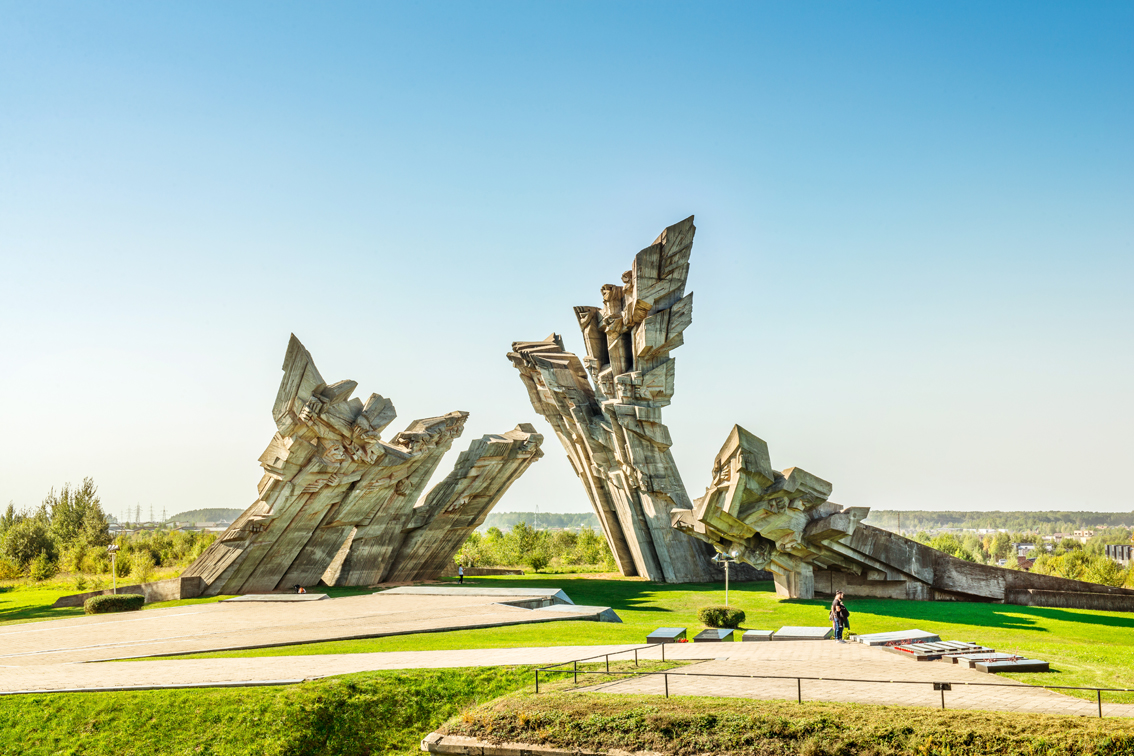
Monument for the victims

The Ninth Fort (Lithuanian: Devintas fortas) is a stronghold in the northern part of Šilainiai elderate, Kaunas, Lithuania. It is a part of the Kaunas Fortress, built in the late 19th century. During the Soviet occupation, the fort was used as a prison and way-station for prisoners being transported to labour camps. After the occupation of Lithuania by Nazi Germany, the fort was used as a place of execution for Jews, captured Soviets, and others.

== History ==
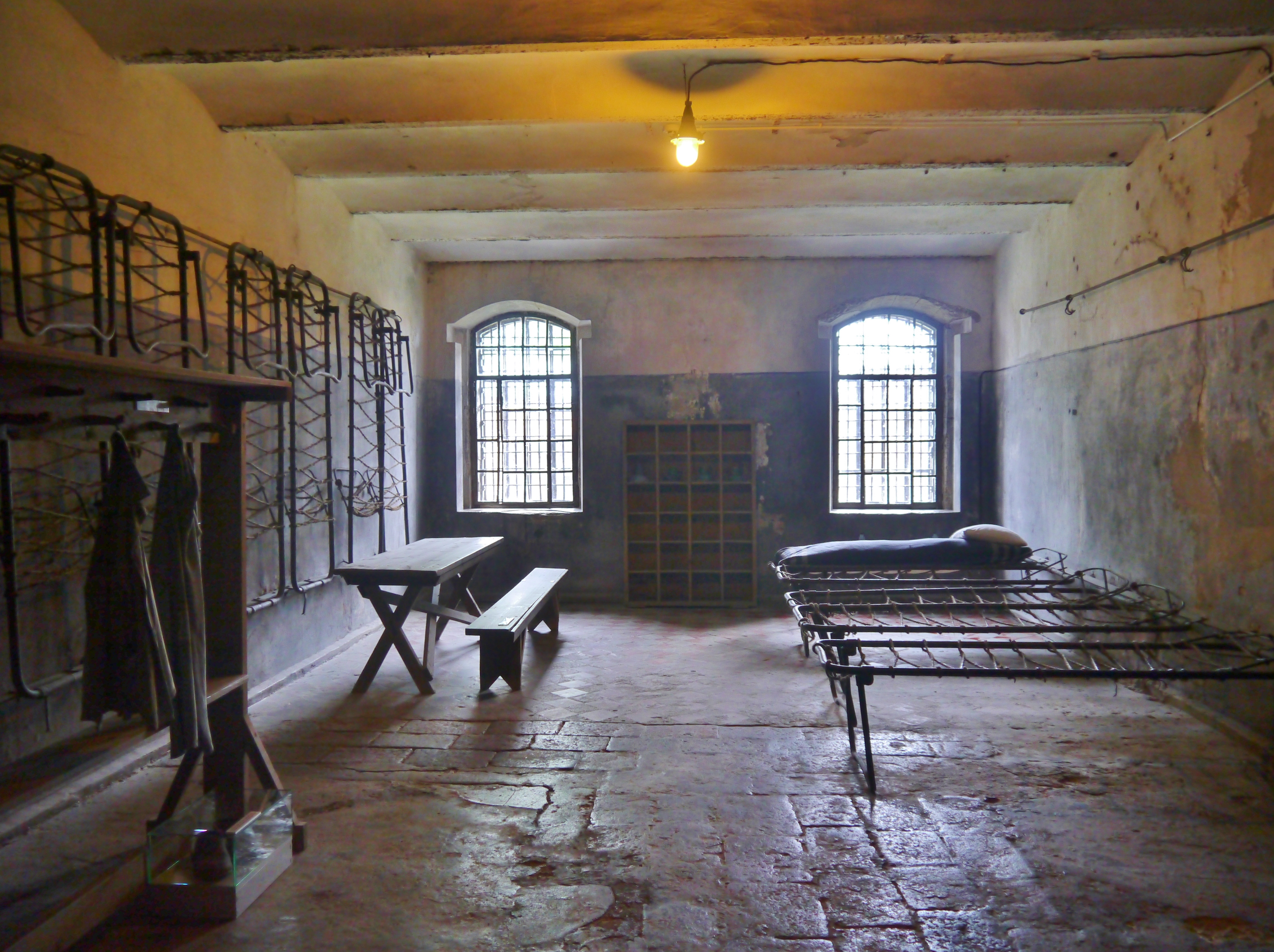
Prison cell.

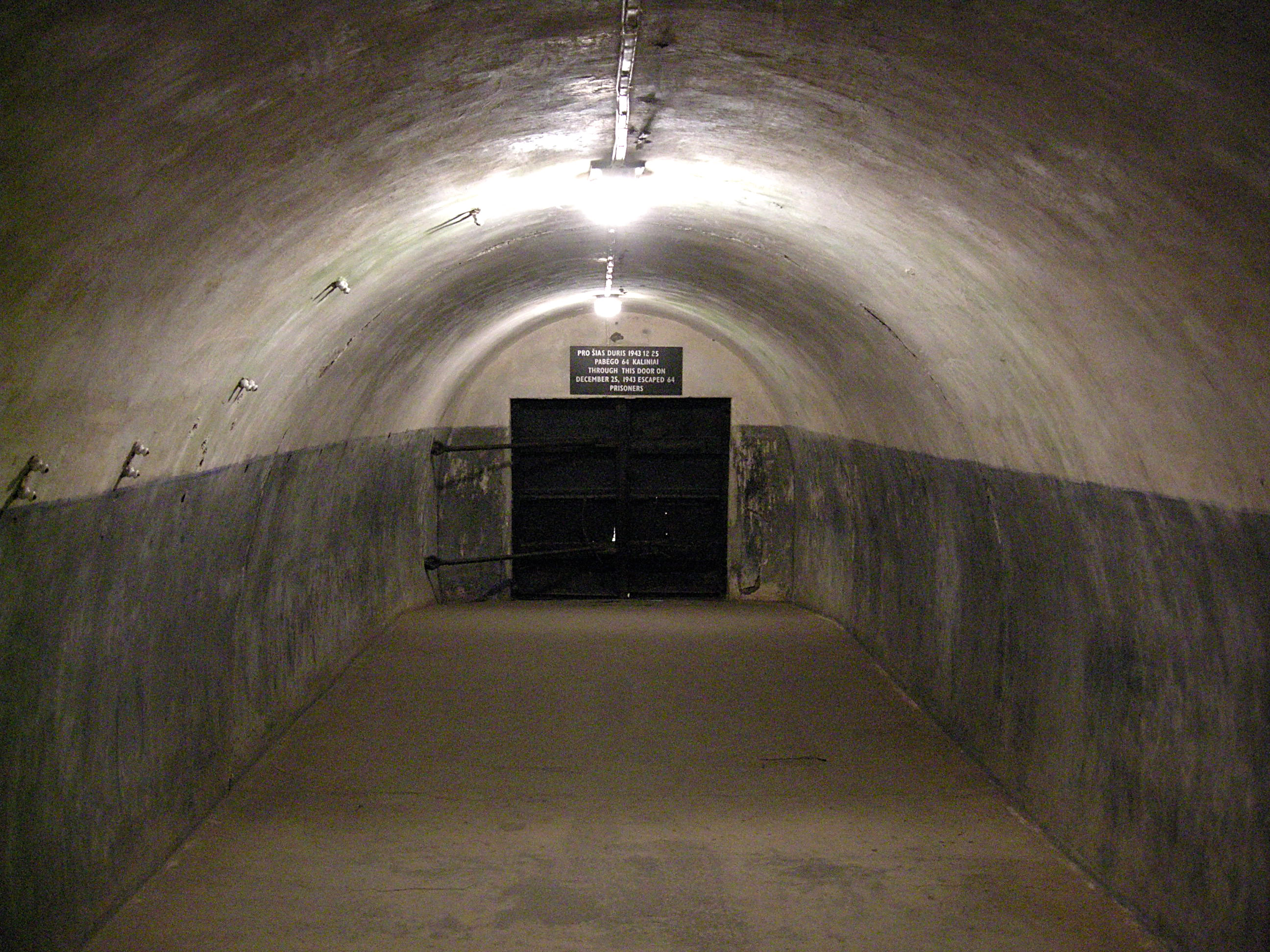
Through this door, 64 prisoners escaped on 25 December 1943.

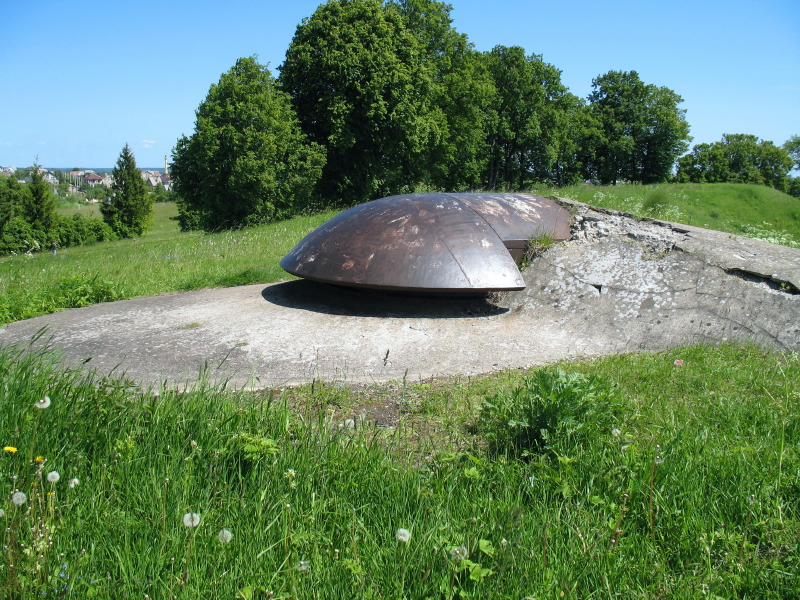
Observation post

At the end of the 19th century the city of Kaunas was fortified and by 1890 was encircled by eight forts and nine gun batteries. Construction of the Ninth Fort (its numerical designation having become its name) began in 1902 and was completed on the eve of World War I. From 1924 on, the Ninth Fort was used as the Kaunas Prison.

During the Soviet occupation in 1940–1941, the Ninth Fort was used by the NKVD to house political prisoners pending transfer to Gulag forced labor camps.

During Nazi occupation, the Ninth Fort was a place of mass murder and 45,000 to 50,000 Jews, most from Kaunas and largely the Kovno Ghetto, were transported to the Ninth Fort and murdered by Nazis and Lithuanian collaborators in what became known as the Kaunas massacre.

Notable among the victims was Rabbi Elchonon Wasserman of Baranovitch. In addition, Jews from as far as France, Austria and Germany were brought to Kaunas during the Nazi occupation, and executed in the Ninth Fort. In 1943, the Germans operated special Jewish squads to dig mass graves and burn the remaining corpses. One squad of 64 people managed to escape the fortress on the eve of 1944. That year, as the Soviets moved in, the Germans liquidated the ghetto and what had by then come to be known as the "Fort of Death". The prisoners were dispersed to other camps. After World War II, the Soviets again used the Ninth Fort as a prison for several years. From 1948 to 1958, farm organizations were managed from the Ninth Fort.

In 1958, a museum was established in the Ninth Fort. In 1959, an exhibition was prepared in four cells, telling of the Nazi war crimes carried out in Lithuania. In 1960, the discovery, cataloging, and forensic investigation of local mass murder sites began.

== Museum ==
The Ninth Fort museum contains collections of historical artifacts related both to Soviet atrocities and the Nazi genocide, as well as materials related to the earlier history of Kaunas and Ninth Fort. Most exhibits are labelled in English.

== Memorial ==
The memorial to the victims of Nazism at the Ninth Fort in Kaunas, Lithuania, was designed by sculptor A. Ambraziunas. Erected in 1984, the monument is 105 feet (32 m) high. The mass burial place of the victims of the massacres carried out in the fort is a grass field, marked by a simple yet frankly worded memorial written in several languages. It reads, "This is the place where Nazis and their assistants killed more than 30,000 Jews from Lithuania and other European countries."
