= Modern architecture of Kaunas =

UNESCO World Heritage Site in Kaunas, Lithuania

UNESCO World Heritage Site
- Details of the eastern façade of the Bank of Lithuania Building in Kaunas

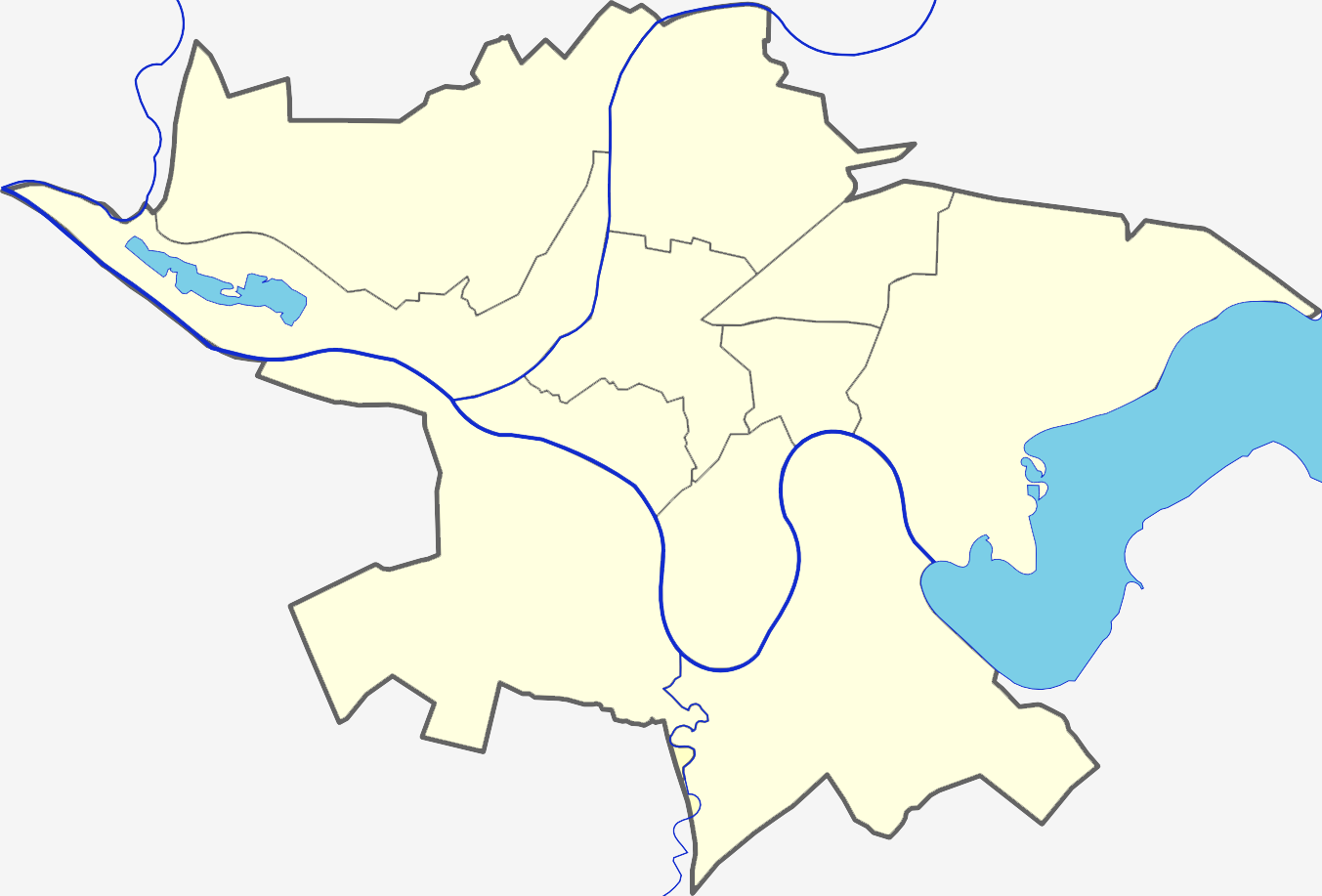
- Location within Kaunas Location within Lithuania
- Location: Kaunas, Kaunas County, Lithuania
- Criteria: Cultural: (iv)
- Inscription: 2023 (45th Session)
- Coordinates: 54°53′49″N 23°55′45″E

Modern architecture of Kaunas, also known as interwar architecture of Kaunas or Kaunas modernism, is an architectural style that emerged in the interwar period of the Republic of Lithuania. It represents a Lithuanian branch of modernist architecture, which was widespread in many Western countries during the interwar period. The style was formed in Kaunas, the temporary capital of Lithuania at the time, and later spread to other cities of the First Republic of Lithuania. Buildings in this style can also be found in Klaipėda, Palanga, Šiauliai, Birštonas, Jonava, Pasvalys, and Ukmergė, where Kaunas architectural projects were often copied in full. Between 1919 and 1940, approximately 12,000 buildings in this style were constructed in Kaunas.

Notable examples of Kaunas modernism include the Kaunas Garrison Officers' Club Building, the Kaunas Central Post Office, the Church of the Resurrection of Christ, the Vytautas the Great War Museum, among others.

Several of these buildings were awarded the European Heritage Label in 2015, and in 2023 they were inscribed on the UNESCO World Heritage List. Analogous examples of modernist architecture that are also inscribed on the World Heritage List include the Berlin Modernist Housing Estates, the White City of Tel Aviv, the city of Asmara (capital of Eritrea), and the works of Jože Plečnik in Ljubljana.

== Historical background of the style ==
In 1918, Lithuania declared independence, and in 1919 the capital of the young Republic of Lithuania was moved to Kaunas. Vilnius at that time was occupied by Polish forces and remained part of Poland until 1939. Kaunas, which had previously been a heavily Russified and militarized fortress city of the Russian Empire, became the temporary capital of Lithuania. This marked the beginning of rapid urban development. Government institutions and the intelligentsia relocated to the city, and Kaunas began to grow into the new political, economic, educational, and cultural center of the state. As the capital of independent Lithuania, Kaunas also became a symbol of Lithuanian freedom and identity. The country's leading intellectuals worked there, laying the foundations for Lithuanian national consciousness and thought.

The city expanded quickly as people moved in both from the Vilnius region, annexed by Poland, and from other parts of Lithuania. Before becoming the temporary capital, Kaunas consisted only of the Old Town (Senamiestis), the New Town (Naujamiestis), Karmelitai (the area between Laisvės Avenue and the Kaunas Kaunas railway station), and part of Žaliakalnis (specifically Ąžuolų Hill, closest to the Old Town). In 1919 the rest of Žaliakalnis, Aleksotas, and Vilijampolė were incorporated into the city, and in 1932 the Šančiai district was also annexed. Two bridges were built to connect the old city with its new districts. The most important areas for modernist construction were the streets of Naujamiestis (Putvinskio, Maironio, Donelaičio, Kęstučio, Mickevičiaus), Vytauto Avenue in Karmelitai, and Žaliakalnis (the so-called Radio district and the area around the Church of the Resurrection).

Kaunas became a multicultural city. In 1923, its population consisted of 59% Lithuanians, 31% Jews, 3% Germans, as well as Russians, Poles, and others. The district of Karmelitai reflected this urban diversity especially clearly. It was divided into sections designated for different communities: a Russian section in the south (with Orthodox churches and schools), a Catholic section (today Ramybė Park), a Muslim section (where the Kaunas mosque was built), and a Protestant Reformed section in the north (mainly inhabited by Germans). The Carmelite cemetery was likewise divided into national sections. Most of Kaunas's Jewish population lived in Vilijampolė, where the ruins of the Great Vilijampolė Synagogue still stood during the interwar years.

In less than two decades Kaunas transformed from a small provincial town into a modern capital of a European state. Architecture played a key role not only in building the city's infrastructure but also in shaping its identity and distinctiveness. The temporary capital became Lithuania's calling card, a way to present the success and achievements of the nation. According to architectural historian Marija Drėmaitė, this architecture is characterized by optimism, confidence, and a belief in a bright national future.

== Architectural features of the style ==
The rise of modernist architecture in Kaunas was strongly influenced by Lithuanian and foreign architects who returned after studies at universities abroad, bringing new ideas with them. This was the second time in Lithuanian history when local architects created their own unique national architectural style while remaining in step with contemporary European trends (the first being the Lithuanian variant of Baroque, the so-called Vilnian Baroque). The imported modernist tendencies blended with pre-existing Lithuanian architectural traditions, producing a distinctive local form of modernism.

Among the key architects who shaped this style were Feliksas Vizbaras (1880–1966), educated in Riga; Vytautas Landsbergis-Žemkalnis (1893–1993), educated in Rome; and Edmundas Alfonsas Frykas, trained in Saint Petersburg. The city's overall development plan was drawn up by engineer Antanas Jokimas (1894–1964). Kaunas also attracted architects of non-Lithuanian origin who had sought refuge in interwar Lithuania and became actively involved in urban development. These included the Russian architect Vladimiras Dubeneckis (1888–1932), who fled persecution in the Soviet Union, the Latvian Karolis Reisonas (1894–1981), Arnas Funkas (1898–1957), who was born in Smolensk and educated in Berlin, and others.

A major architectural influence on Kaunas modernism was the Bauhaus movement in Germany. Its principles emphasized minimalist and rhythmically repeating forms without excessive ornamentation, a synthesis of aesthetics and functionality, harmony of façades, and the use of geometric composition. Attention was given to sunlight and hygiene in buildings, and to the relationship between a building's architecture, its function, and its usability.

Kaunas modernism is characterized by the frequent use of vertical lines, which often resulted in tall and narrow windows, especially in public buildings. A typical feature of multi-storey buildings was a vertically elongated entrance portal enclosing the staircase, running the full height of the building. Alongside the strict use of straight lines, architects also employed curves and circles: the Vytautas the Great War Museum features arched forms, while residential buildings often incorporated protruding circular balconies and round windows. In particularly innovative projects, curved glass was used for windows, as in the Kaunas Central Post Office. Entrance doors also became a noticeable design feature, carefully integrated into the overall architectural composition.

In the Lithuanian context, the minimalist aesthetics of modernism were often complemented with decorative elements unusual for the style. National motifs and patterns derived from Lithuanian textiles, woodcarving, and folk painting were widely used in both façades and interiors. These features reflected the search for a national style of architecture and gave Kaunas modernism its distinctive identity.

== Types of buildings and their characteristics ==
Most buildings in the Kaunas modernist style were residential houses, as well as facilities for economic, educational, and religious purposes.

=== Public buildings ===
Kaunas State Philharmonic (former Palace of Justice and the Parliament)

Kaunas Central Post Office

Kaunas Clinics

Few administrative buildings were constructed in Kaunas during the interwar period. Although the new capital urgently needed premises for government functions, Kaunas was always regarded only as a temporary capital, with the expectation that the capital would eventually return to Vilnius, thus its status was not formalized in any official document (see also: Union for the Liberation of Vilnius). As a result, existing buildings were adapted for administrative use: the Presidential Palace was located in the former residence of the Kaunas Governor, the Ministry of Foreign Affairs operated from the building of the Žemės Bankas, and the Constituent Assembly of Lithuania and later Seimas (parliament) initially met in the Kaunas City Theatre and a gymnasium building. One of the few exceptions was the Palace of the Ministry of Justice (Lithuanian: Teisingumo ministerijos rūmai), designed by architect Frykas and completed in 1929; from 1936 the Seimas also convened there.

During this period, many public and representative buildings were erected to serve as meeting places for various communities and organizations. The Palace of Labour (Lithuanian: Darbo rūmai), designed by architect Adolfas Lukošaitis and completed in 1939 (Vytauto Ave. 79), hosted educational, cultural, and social events for workers. The St. Zita Women's Charitable Society occupied its own purpose-built house (1924, Gimnazijos St. 7). The Catholic youth organization Ateitininkai was housed in its own headquarters (Lithuanian: Ateitininkų sąjungos rūmai) at Laisvės Ave. 13. On Nemuno Street stood the building of the Jewish community.

One of the most notable buildings of this type is the Building of the Officers' Club of the Kaunas Garrison (Lithuanian: Kauno įgulos karininkų ramovė), a multifunctional center for the Lithuanian Army. Designed by architect Vladimir Dubeneckis (Vladas Dubeneckis) and built between 1931 and 1937, the building combined features of functionalism with elements of folk architecture, visible both inside and out. Its luxurious interiors are well preserved. The first floor housed the largest restaurant in Kaunas and in the entire Baltic states region, Three Giants (Lithuanian: Trys milžinai), equipped with the most advanced ventilation system of the time. The second floor contained ceremonial halls, including the Vytautas the Great Hall (Vytauto Didžiojo seklyčia), the President's Room (Prezidento kambarys), and the Grand Dukes' Chamber (Kunigaikščių salė). The third floor had a military lounge, while the fourth floor operated as a hotel.

Buildings of social infrastructure also played an important role in the city's architecture. The most prominent example is the Kaunas Central Post Office on Laisvės alėja, completed in 1931 to a design by Vizbaras. Combining functionalism with national decorative style and introducing numerous innovative solutions, it became a model of Kaunas modernism. Other infrastructure buildings included the Žaliakalnis Funicular stations, the Palace for Firefighters built in 1930, and the Kaunas District Administration (1934, Vytauto Ave. 91).

Healthcare facilities were underdeveloped in Lithuania at the time, and Kaunas long lacked a modern hospital. The main facility still operated in a former Russian Imperial hospital building dating to 1908. Several private institutions were established, such as the Antanas Gilys Hospital (1934, Putvinskio St. 62) and the Women's Hospital of Pranas Mažylis (1936, Putvinskio St. 3). A final decision to build a large hospital complex, the Kaunas Clinics, was made only in 1936. Located on the edge of the Žaliakalnis district, the ambitious complex was completed in 1939, just before the war. Designed by French architect Urbain Cassan, the five interconnected buildings formed one of the largest medical facilities in the Baltic states, notable for its modern design solutions. The buildings were linked by underground tunnels, which also served as defensive shelters.

=== Educational and sports buildings ===
KTU Faculty of Chemical Technology

Physical Culture Palace in 1938

Jonas Jablonskis Gymnasium

The number of schools in Kaunas increased significantly during the interwar period. At first, many of them operated in pre-independence buildings, such as the Saulė Gymnasium (VIII), the Aušros Girls' Gymnasium (II), or the Aušros Boys' Gymnasium (I). Soon, however, new buildings were constructed specifically for Lithuanian educational purposes. Following the principles of functionalism, their design emphasized wide window openings on the façades to provide classrooms with sufficient light. Some of the finest examples of modernist school architecture include Jonas Jablonskis Gymnasium (1931, Aušros St. 3), the Third Kaunas Gymnasium (1937, Aukštaičių St. 78), and the Sixth Kaunas Gymnasium (1938, Skuodo St. 27), the latter designed by architect Stasys Kudokas, who later emigrated to the United States.

National minorities also established their own schools. One of the largest school buildings in Kaunas was the Kaunas Jewish Real Gymnasium (1931, Kęstučio St. 85). At the time, it was considered one of the most beautiful and modern school buildings not only in Kaunas but in all of Lithuania. It contained 16 classrooms, art and gymnastics halls, kindergartens, showers, and washrooms. The German community was served by the German Real Gymnasium, designed by architect Landsbergis-Žemkalnis and completed in 1930. The Russian Gymnasium, completed in 1925 (now the Teacher Education Center, Vytauto Ave. 44), provided education for the Russian minority. The Polish Adam Mickiewicz Gymnasium, completed in 1931 (Miško St. 1), served the Polish community.

Secondary specialized and higher education also developed rapidly. With the establishment and growth of the University of Lithuania, new faculty buildings were constructed. The main building was erected at the corner of K. Donelaičio and A. Mickevičiaus streets. In 1931, the Faculty of Physics and Chemistry buildings, designed by architect Mykolas Songaila, were completed on the slope of Aleksotas Hill (they have not survived). In 1933, architect Dubeneckis designed the Faculty of Medicine buildings, and from 1930 Jonas Jasiukaitis worked on the design of the Veterinary Academy. Other higher education institutions in Kaunas included the Kaunas Art School (1923, A. Mickevičiaus St. 27), the Kaunas Conservatory (1933, Gruodžio St. 3), and the Higher Technical School (1938, Tvirtovės Ave. 35), designed by architect Kudokas.

Physical education and sports were also an important focus in interwar Kaunas. Sports facilities were mainly concentrated in the Žaliakalnis district, on Vytautas Hill, within the Ąžuolynas area. In 1934, the Physical Culture Palace (Lithuanian: Fiziško auklėjimo rūmai) were completed at Sporto St. 6, designed by architect Landsbergis-Žemkalnis. After the Lithuanian national basketball team won the European Championship in 1937, the next championship was scheduled to take place in Kaunas in May 1939. For this purpose, the Kaunas Sports Hall was built in just four winter months. Designed by architect Anatolijus Rozenbliumas, it could accommodate 11,000 spectators and was praised as one of the most advanced facilities of its kind in Europe.

=== Religious buildings ===
Christ's Resurrection Basilica

Evangelical Reformed Church

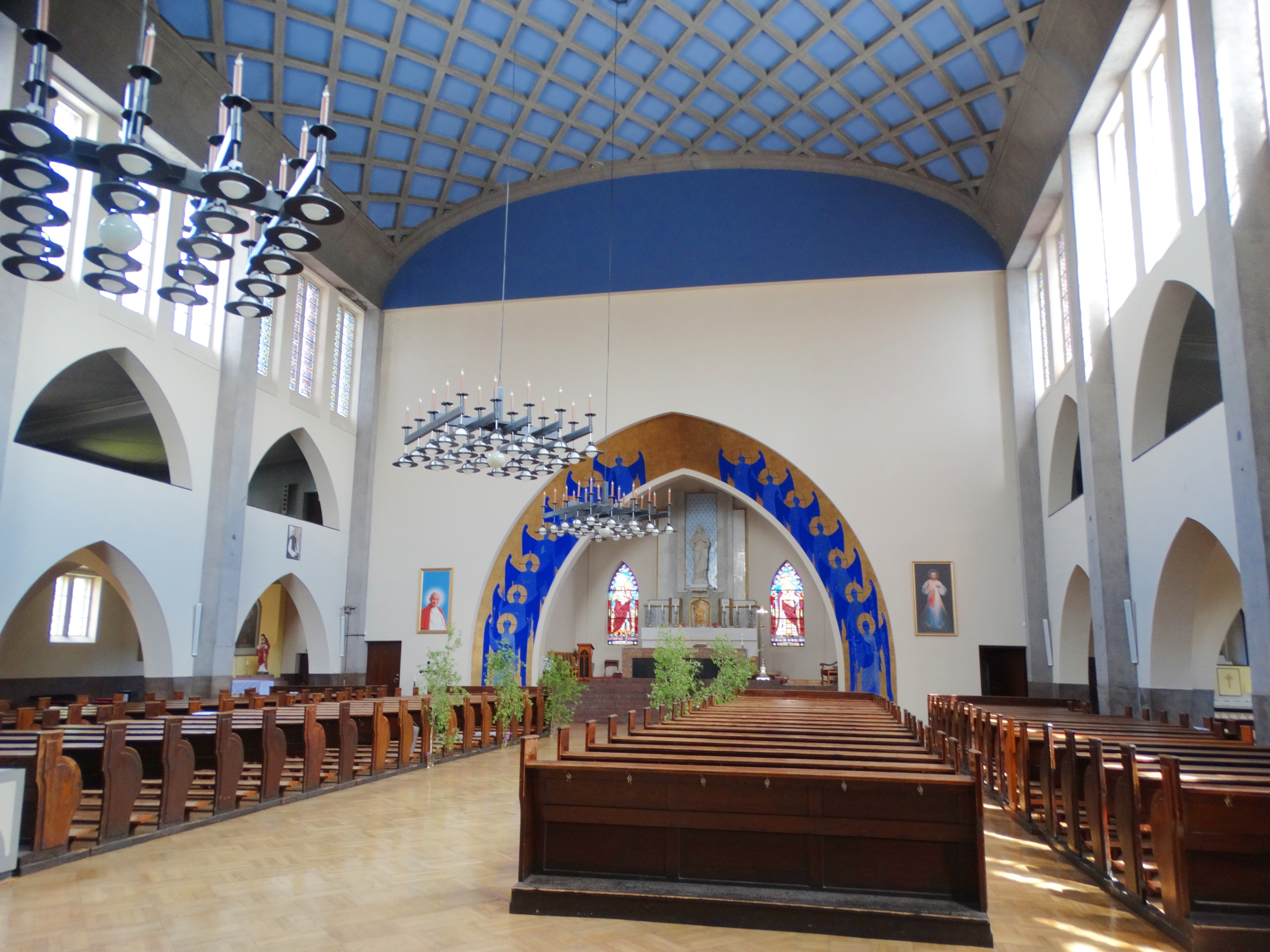
Church of the Most Sacred Heart of Jesus

Kaunas Mosque

As Lithuanian national identity was being restored, religion gained increasing importance in public life. The expansion of the city also created a demand for new churches in recently incorporated districts. Several were built in the modernist style, including the Church of St. Anthony of Padua (architect Antanas Bistrickas, 1936) near the Kaunas Zoo; the Church of St. Vincent de Paul (architect Nikolaijus Mačiulskis, 1934) in Petrašiūnai; the Church of the Sacred Heart of Jesus (architect Algirdas Šalkauskis, 1938) in Šančiai; and the Evangelical Reformed Church (architect Vaclovas Michnevičius, 1940) in Naujamiestis which is nicknamed the little sister of the Basilica of the Resurrection of Christ.

In 1933 - 1934, the Kaunas Priest Seminary Rectorate building, designed by architect Reisonas, was constructed near the historic buildings in the Kaunas Old Town and in the interwar period was used not only by the Rectorate but also by Church Heritage Museum.

The most important symbol of the reborn country of Lithuania, however, became the Christ's Resurrection Basilica, which was planned as a Lithuanian nation's pantheon. Conceived from 1926 as the principal architectural landmark of the city, the ambitious project by Karolis Reisonas required substantial public donations, which led to repeated interruptions in construction. The church was not completed before the war, and final construction and adaptation for worship were only finished after the restoration of Lithuanian independence in 1990.

In 1930, the 500th death anniversary of the Lithuanian Grand Duke Vytautas the Great was commemorated by building the Kaunas Mosque, which replaced the older mosque which was built in 1906, for the Lipka Tatars who were settled in Lithuania by Grand Duke Vytautas the Great during the Middle Ages.

=== Cultural buildings ===
Aerial view of the Vytautas the Great War Museum, tower of the Kaunas Carillon and M. K. Čiurlionis National Art Museum

As the new Lithuanian capital, Kaunas also required a museum to reflect the nation's history and to collect and exhibit its most significant works of art and culture. The idea of a national museum in Lithuania had been promoted since the very beginning of independence. In 1921, a plot was allocated between Donelaičio and Putvinskio streets, where Unity Square (Lithuanian: Vienybės aikštė) was later formed, becoming one of the main axes of Kaunas's new center. In 1929, a competition was announced for the design of the museum, with architects Vladimir Dubeneckis, Karolis Reisonas, and Kazimieras Kriščiukaitis involved in the project. The museum complex was completed in 1936 and included the Vytautas the Great War Museum and the M. K. Čiurlionis National Museum of Art.

Cinema also became a popular form of entertainment, and the number of movie theaters (Lithuanian: kinematografai) grew steadily. By 1940 there were 17 operating in the city. The earliest theaters were located in converted older buildings, such as the Pallas cinema, which opened in 1919 at the corner of Laisvės Avenue and Maironio Street (today Laisvės Av. 82). Later, purpose-built cinemas were constructed. The oldest of these was the Odeon (1925), now home to the Kaunas Puppet Theatre. Other surviving examples of modernist cinemas include Daina (1936), Aušra (1939), Pasaka (1940), Romuva (1940), and others.

=== Commercial buildings ===
The Bank of Lithuania Building

Pažanga Palace (left) and Pienocentras Palace (right) in 1938

Romuva Cinema, the oldest still operational movie theater in Lithuania, which was initially opened in 1940

With the growth of Lithuanian's economy, Kaunas became the country's most important economic center, hosting numerous institutions related to business life, including banks, enterprises, and factories.

In 1924, an international competition was announced for the design of the Bank of Lithuania. The winning proposal, by Mykolas Songaila, was realized in 1928 at the corner of K. Donelaičio and Maironio streets, near Unity Square. The exterior of the bank combined a historicist style with modernist elements, while the interiors prominently featured national motifs, preserved original furniture, and artworks. The building was equipped with mechanical heating, air humidification, and electric elevators. The basement housed safes with monitoring corridors and vaults. Apartments for employees were located in the same building, and Prime Minister Augustinas Voldemaras lived in a mansard corner apartment. A rooftop terrace-garden was also created.

Another significant institution was the Central Jewish Bank (Laisvės alėja 106), designed by G. Mazelis and M. Grodzenskis and built in 1925. In addition to financial services, it also functioned as a community center, with shops, a café, and a library. A unique interior passage created an indoor shopping street. In 1932, the Polish Credit Society completed its headquarters (K. Donelaičio St. 76), designed by architect E. Frykas and distinguished by neo-Baroque forms.

The earliest interwar bank buildings still retained historicist features. However, the Land Bank (K. Donelaičio St. 73, now the Kaunas University of Technology Rectorate), designed by architect Karolis Reisonas in 1935, abandoned most historicist elements and embraced modernist principles, emphasizing light, simplicity, and clarity. Even further in the modernist direction was another major economic symbol of Lithuania: the Kaunas Chamber of Commerce and Industry, designed by architect Vytautas Landsbergis-Žemkalnis and completed in 1939 (K. Donelaičio St. 8).

The headquarters of major companies were concentrated along the city's main artery, Laisvės alėja, and were notable for their height. These were the first multi-story buildings in Lithuania, standing out against the predominantly two-story urban fabric and sometimes being referred to as "skyscrapers." A prominent example was the Pažanga building (Laisvės Av. 53, 1934, architect Feliksas Vizbaras), which housed the editorial offices of Lietuvos aidas and other publications, as well as the headquarters of the Tautininkai Union. Nearby, in 1934, architect Landsbergis-Žemkalnis designed the headquarters of the dairy cooperative Pienocentras, which included a shop, a canteen, and the most modern hair salon in Kaunas. In 1940, the Savings Bank building, designed by architect Arnas Funkas, was completed on Laisvės alėja (today the Kaunas City Municipality Building).

The main factories were located on the outskirts of the city. One of the industrial zones developed between Gruodžio, Gedimino, and Karmelitų streets, on the site of the former Tilmansai Trading Company. There the Litex and Kauno audiniai textile factories (1932) were established. Closer to the Kaunas railway station, the Volfas Engelman brewery resumed operations since 1922. In Vilijampolė, the Boston wool factory (A. Stulginskio St. 41), the Silva hosiery factory (Raudondvario pr. 93), and the Kaspinas haberdashery factory (Raudondvario pr. 76) were founded. In Šančiai, the Drobė textile factory (Drobės St. 62), the Cotton factory (Ukrainiečių St.), and the Flora necktie factory (Virvių St.) were active. In Žaliakalnis, the Lima wool factory (Jonavos St.), the Ragutis brewery, and many other enterprises operated.

=== Residential buildings ===
Around 7,000 buildings constructed in the interwar period were residential, reflecting the rapid growth of Kaunas's population at the time. Modern infrastructure was introduced to the city: many districts were connected to running water, sewerage, and electricity.

Most houses were private single-family residences built according to standard designs. Large concentrations of such houses can still be seen in the Ąžuolynas area on Vytautas Hill and in Žaliakalnis, where the urban layout and architectural environment of the period remain well preserved. These homes often featured multiple entrances for different purposes, sliding partitions, built-in wardrobes, pantries, and other amenities that made everyday life more convenient. The attic floor beneath the roof was known as salkos. Among the typical houses, some particularly authentic examples stand out, such as the A. Iljinienė House (K. Donelaičio St. 19; 1934), designed by architect Funkas, Lidija Vaišvilienė and Olimpija Balsienė houses (M. Dobužinskio St. 6; 1939), the Nadiežda Nagornienė House (V. Putvinskio St. 54; 1934), Feliksas Dobkevičius House (Vičiūnų St. 9, Panemunė; 1934), the Kudokas Villa (M. K. Putino St. 11; 1937), designed by architect Kudokas for his own residence. Nearby stands the villa Eglutė, while near Ąžuolynas are the Sližiai House (Sporto St. 4; 1931) and other buildings with more expressive architecture.

Some buildings in interwar period Kaunas were constructed for the use of foreign countries diplomatic missions, namely the Vatican Diplomatic Mission (apostolic nunciature) building (V. Putvinskio St. 56; 1930 - 1931; now Artists' House), Japanese Consulate building (Vaižganto St. 30; 1939).

As the population increased, the first apartment houses also became popular. These were often built by large enterprises or the state for their employees, but wealthy individuals also constructed such buildings, usually occupying one floor themselves while renting out the others. Notable examples include the Juozas Daugirdas House (Vytauto pr. 30; 1930), the Kaunas City Municipality Low-Cost Apartment Colony (K. Petrausko St., 1933 - 1934), the former house of mayor Jonas Vileišis (V. Putvinskio St. 68; 1930), the Lapėnai House (Kęstučio St. 38; 1932), the buildings at Laisvės Av. 83–85 (1940), the Taubė Elšteinienė House (Sapiegos St. 4; 1935), the Teresė and Mykolas Narbutai House (Žemaičių St. 11; 1932), the Kazimieras Škėma House (V. Putvinskio St. 60; 1933), the Vladas Stankūnas House (Savanorių Av. 58; 1934), the Dormitory for Disabled War Veterans (K. Donelaičio St. 75; 1934 - 1935), the Juozas Kraucevičius House (K. Donelaičio St. 26; 1936 - 1937), the Officer Algirdas Sliesoraitis House (V. Putvinskio St. 32; 1938), and others.

A. Iljinienė House

Tulpė Cooperative House

Tercijonai House

K. Škėma House

Lapėnai House

L. Vaišvilienė and O. Balsienė houses

Artists' House, the former Vatican Apostolic Nunciature

Sugihara House, the former Japanese Consulate

Modernist style residential houses at Maironio St.

N. Nagornienė House

V. Stankūnas House

== Soviet and post-Soviet periods ==
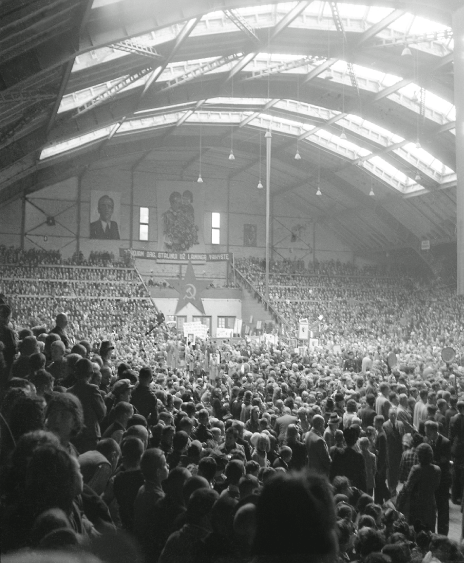
The Lithuanian Teachers' Congress in the Kaunas Sports Hall in 1940, where the participating teachers refused to sign The Internationale and instead sang the Tautiška giesmė in protest of the Soviet occupation of Lithuania.

The development of interwar modernist architecture was abruptly interrupted in 1940 due to the outbreak of World War II. A significant portion of buildings in this style was destroyed or severely damaged during the war, while others fell into disrepair or were demolished during the Soviet period. Nevertheless, the architectural tradition formed during the interwar years and the early decades of the Lithuanian SSR, as well as the architects trained during that time, partially influenced Soviet architectural styles.

During the Soviet era, most of these buildings were repurposed, often at the expense of their original form or interior design. Poor-quality extensions and superstructures were added, interiors were reconfigured, and buildings were adapted for use as warehouses, factories, apartments, and other functions. For example, the Basilica of the Resurrection of Christ was used as part of the Kaunas Radio Factory, the façade of the Jewish Bank was covered with a new cladding, and the building became the Tadas Ivanauskas Zoological Museum. Many structures were left without maintenance, not repaired, and not properly valued. In line with the prevailing Soviet ideology, the period of Lithuania's first independence was demonized or ridiculed as "bourgeois frivolity", and the impression was created that nothing significant or valuable had been achieved at that time.

Nevertheless, as V. Petrulis notes, a movement to preserve this architecture emerged as early as 1972. Thanks to this effort, about 20% of the most valuable buildings were included in the heritage list even during the Soviet rule.

Despite the passage of time, many of these buildings have survived to the present day, albeit in varying conditions. More active interest in this heritage in Lithuania emerged in the 2010s when it was begun to sought to include the Modernist architecture of Kaunas to the UNESCO Tentative List. With the support of the Kaunas City Municipality, restoration and façades renovation projects began. However, a significant portion of these structures still lacks owners or a clear function, leaving their future uncertain.

In 2015, some examples of this architecture were recognized with the European Heritage Label. This recognition inspired a nomination to UNESCO, aiming to include this architectural heritage on the World Heritage Sites List. On September 23, 2023, the Lithuanian nomination Modernist Kaunas: Architecture of Optimism, 1919-1939 was approved by the majority of the World Heritage Committee countries and the Kaunas modernist architecture was included to the World Heritage Sites List.

In the 2010s-2020s new buildings in Kaunas were completed of which some features resemble the interwar period modernist architecture of Kaunas (e.g. round windows, rounded corners with curved windows, etc.).

== European Heritage Label ==
Kaunas City Municipality Building (former Savings Bank Building)

Kaunas Garrison Officers' Club Building

Kaunas County Police Headquarters (former Kaunas County Municipality Palace)

Transactions Hall of the Bank of Lithuania Building in the interwar period

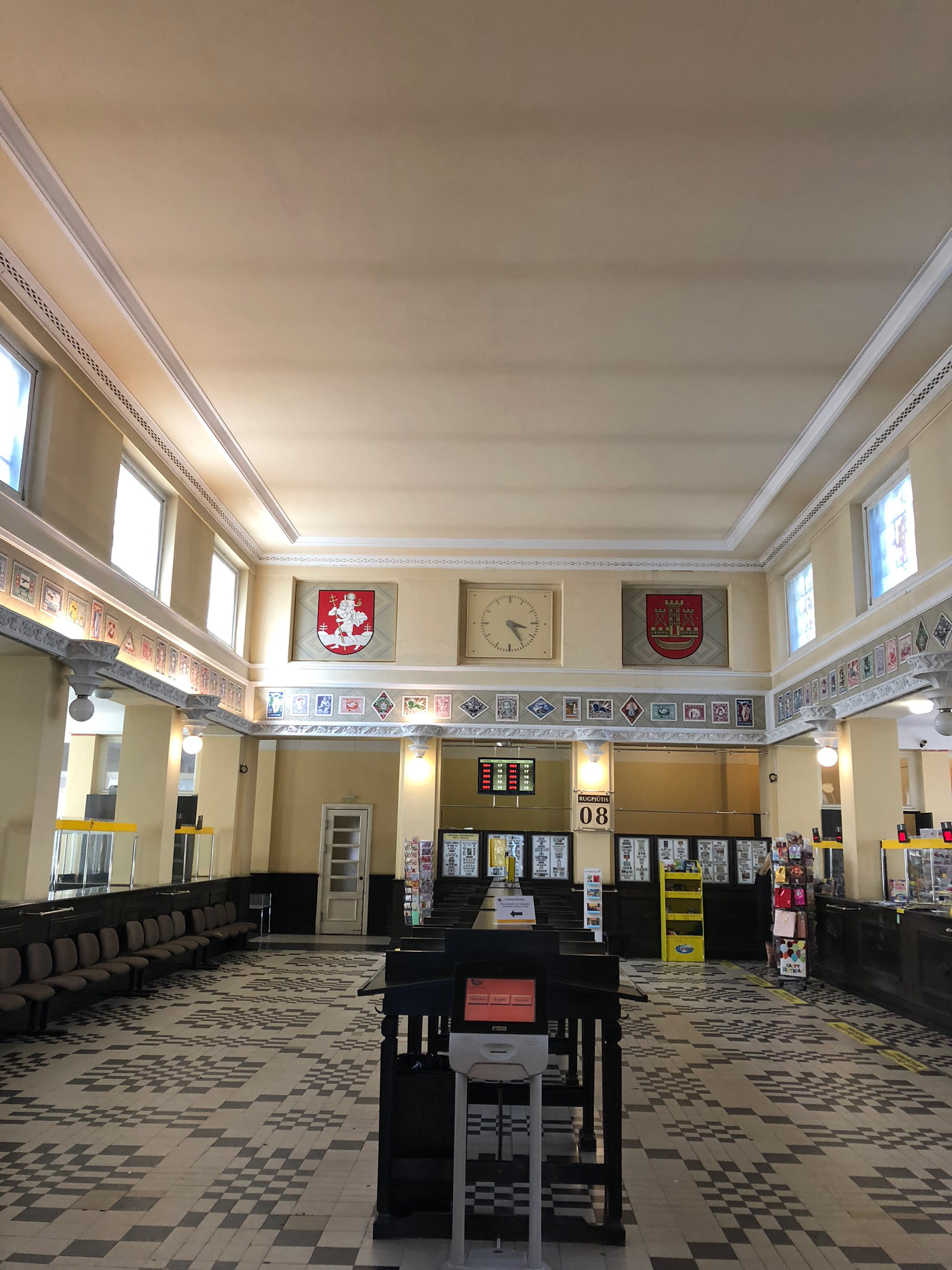
Interior of the Kaunas Central Post Office featuring floor tiling with the Lithuanian folk patterns motifs and coats of arms of Lithuanian cities (Vilnius and Klaipėda)

In 2015, 44 interwar period Modernist architecture sites in Kaunas were included in the European Heritage Label list:

Heritage Site	Years	Address
Kaunas Central Post Office	1931	Laisvės Av. 102
Former office of the Pažanga Company	1931–1934	Laisvės Av. 53
Former office of the Pienocentras Company	1931–1934	Laisvės Av. 55 / S. Daukanto St. 18
Kaunas County Main Police Commissariat (former Kaunas County Municipality Palace)	1932–1933	Laisvės Av. 14 / Vytauto Ave. 91
Faculty of Chemical Technology at KTU (former Research Laboratory of the Armaments Department)	1933–1937	Radvilėnų Ave. 19
Chamber of Commerce and Industry	1937–1938	K. Donelaičio St. 8
Central building of the Lithuanian Sports University (former Physical Culture Palace)	1933–1934	Sporto St. 6
Kaunas Sports Hall	1938–1939	Perkūno Ave. 5
Central building of the Lithuanian University of Health Sciences (former Faculty of Medicine of VDU)	1931–1933	A. Mickevičiaus St. 9
Kaunas Garrison Officers' Club Building	1931–1937	A. Mickevičiaus St. 19
Vytautas the Great War Museum and M. K. Čiurlionis National Art Museum	1929–1936	K. Donelaičio St. 64 / V. Putvinskio St. 55
Kaunas City Municipality (former Savings Bank building)	1938–1940	Laisvės Av. 96 / L. Sapiegos St. 2
Žaliakalnis Funicular	1931–1933	Aušros St. 6
Aleksotas Funicular	1935	Amerikos lietuvių St. 6
Central building of KTU (former Land Bank)	1933–1935	K. Donelaičio St. 73 / Vienybės Sq.
Christ's Resurrection Basilica	1933–1940	Žemaičių St. 31
Church of the Most Sacred Heart of Jesus	1938	A. Juozapavičiaus Ave. 60
Jonas Jablonskis Gymnasium (former Primary School)	1930–1931	Aušros St. 3 / Žemaičių St.
Vaižgantas Progymnasium at KTU (former Šančiai Gymnasium)	1938	Skuodo St. 27 / Servitutų St. 72
Romuva Cinema	1938–1940	Laisvės Av. 54
Former Pasaka Cinema	1939–1940	Savanorių Ave. 124
Former house of Moise and Malka Chaimsonas	1930–1931	Maironio St. 13
Former house of Bera Goldberg	1937	V. Putvinskio St. 52
Former house of doctor Nadežda Nagornienė	1934	V. Putvinskio St. 54
Kaunas Artists' House (former Vatican Nunciature)	1931	V. Putvinskio St. 56
Former house of lawyer Kazimieras Škėma	1932–1933	V. Putvinskio St. 60
Former building of Antanas Gylys Hospital	1933	V. Putvinskio St. 62
Former house of artist Antanas Žmuidzinavičius	1928	V. Putvinskio St. 64
Former house of mayor Jonas Vileišis	1930	V. Putvinskio St. 68
Former house of engineer Antanas Gravrogkas	1932	V. Putvinskio St. 70
Former house of Vincas and Ona Tercijonas	1936	V. Putvinskio St. 72
Former house of Paulina Kalvaitytė and Vladas Lašas	1933	Laisvės Av. 3
Former villa of architect Stasys Kudokas	1937	V. Mykolaičio-Putino St. 11
Former house of Elijošius Šneideris	1938	Vaidilutės St. 3
Kaunas Art Gymnasium (former villa of Juozas Tūbelis)	1933	Dainavos St. 1
Former house of Jonas Lapėnas	1932	Kęstučio St. 38
Former house of contractor Mykolas Grodzenskis	1929	K. Donelaičio St. 17
Former house of Aleksandra Iljinienė	1933	K. Donelaičio St. 19
Former house of entrepreneur Mina Kotkauskienė	1929–1930	Laisvės Av. 69
Former house of Taubė-Feibė Elšteinienė	1935	L. Sapiegos St. 4
Former villa of Česlovas Pacevičius	1934	Vydūno Ave. 59
Former house of entrepreneur Juozas Daugirdas	1930–1931	Vytauto Ave. 30
Former apartment building of Butas Company	1931–1932	Trakų St. 5
Former house of Tulpė Cooperative	1925–1926	A. Mickevičiaus St. 15

== Bibliography ==
- Kairys, Simonas (2021). Modernist Kaunas: Architecture of Optimism, 1919-1939. Nomination Dossier. Kaunas: Ministry of Culture of the Republic of Lithuania; UNESCO.
