= List of World Heritage Sites in Lithuania =

World Heritage Sites in Lithuania. Blue dots mark the sites of Struve Geodetic Arc.

The United Nations Educational, Scientific and Cultural Organization (UNESCO) designates World Heritage Sites of outstanding universal value to cultural or natural heritage which have been nominated by countries which are signatories to the UNESCO World Heritage Convention, established in 1972. Cultural heritage consists of monuments (such as architectural works, monumental sculptures, or inscriptions), groups of buildings, and sites (including archaeological sites). Natural heritage consists of natural features (physical and biological formations), geological and physiographical formations (including habitats of threatened species of animals and plants), and natural sites which are important from the point of view of science, conservation, or natural beauty. Lithuania accepted the convention on 31 March 1992, making its natural and historical sites eligible for inclusion on the list. The first site added to the list was the Vilnius Historic Centre, in 1994. Further sites were added in 2000, 2004, 2005, and 2023. In total, there are five sites on the list, all of them cultural. Two sites are transnational: the Curonian Spit is shared with Russia and the Struve Geodetic Arc is shared with nine other countries. In addition to its World Heritage Sites, Lithuania also maintains one property on its tentative list.

== World Heritage Sites ==
UNESCO lists sites under ten criteria; each entry must meet at least one of the criteria. Criteria i through vi are cultural, and vii through x are natural.

* Transnational site

World Heritage Sites
Site	Image	Location	Year listed	UNESCO data	Description
Vilnius Historic Centre	A look from above at the remains of fortifications above a river	Vilnius	1994	541; ii, iv (cultural)	Vilnius was the political centre of the Grand Duchy of Lithuania from the 13th to the end of the 18th century. The historic centre comprises the areas of the Vilnius Castle Complex (three castles, the first dating back to around 1000 CE, Gediminas' Tower pictured) and the area that was encircled by a wall in the Middle Ages. The street plan is radial, originating out from the original castle site. Despite invasions and partial destruction, the city has preserved a large number of buildings, in Gothic, Renaissance, Baroque, and Neoclassical styles. Historic sites include the Cathedral Square, the Town Hall, and the Vilnius University complex.
Curonian Spit*	Sandy dune, a wooden trail and a wooden sign board	Neringa and Klaipėda district	2000	994; v (cultural)	The Curonian Spit, a 98-kilometre (61 mi) long sandy dune (a spit) that separates the Curonian Lagoon from the Baltic Sea, has been inhabited since prehistoric times. Intense logging activities in the 17th and 18th centuries resulted in the dunes moving towards the Lagoon, burying the oldest settlements in the process. Dune stabilization work started in the 19th century and is still ongoing. It includes building a protective dune ridge, as well as planting trees and hedges. In time, some of the ancient fishermen villages have been transformed into tourist resorts, with lighthouses, piers, churches, schools, and villas. The area is also important for its sand flora and fauna, and as a bird migration path. The northern part of the Spit is in Lithuania, while the southern part is in Kaliningrad Oblast, Russia.
Kernavė Archaeological Site (Cultural Reserve of Kernavė)	Mounds covered by grass. Stairs lead to some of the mounds.	Širvintos district	2004	1137; iii, iv (cultural)	The area around Kernavė has been inhabited continuously since the 9th or 8th millennium BCE, and there are several layers of archaeological findings from different periods. The most prominent remains are from the Middle Ages, from the 13th century, when Kernavė was an important feudal town. It had an extensive fortification system, parts of which (five hill forts) are still visible today. The town was razed by the Teutonic Order in late 14th century but human occupancy of the area continued until modern times. A cultural reserve was established in 1989.
Struve Geodetic Arc*	A black stone pillar and a white fence marking the site.	Panemunėlis, Nemenčinė, Nemėžis	2005	1187, ii, iii, vi (cultural)	The Struve Geodetic Arc is a series of triangulation points, stretching over a distance of 2,820 kilometres (1,750 mi) from Hammerfest in Norway to the Black Sea. The points were set up in a survey by the astronomer Friedrich Georg Wilhelm von Struve who first carried out an accurate measurement of a long segment of a meridian, which helped to establish the size and shape of the Earth. Originally, there were 265 station points. The World Heritage Site includes 34 points in ten countries (north to south: Norway, Sweden, Finland, Russia, Estonia, Latvia, Lithuania, Belarus, Moldova, Ukraine), three of which are in Lithuania. The site at Meškonys is pictured.
Modernist Kaunas: Architecture of Optimism, 1919–1939	A brown 1930s building in the front.	Kaunas	2023	1661, iv (cultural)	During the Interwar period, the historic capital of Lithuania, Vilnius, was lost to Poland, and Kaunas was designated the temporary capital. This triggered a construction boom as all the vital infrastructure for a new country had to be built. The architectural style combined the national traditions and the contemporary influences from abroad to form a local school of Modernism. More than 6,000 buildings from the period have survived until today, including the Christ's Resurrection Church, the Central Post Office (pictured), the Bank of Lithuania building, and the Officers' Club Building.

== Tentative list ==
In addition to sites inscribed on the World Heritage List, member states can maintain a list of tentative sites that they may consider for nomination. Nominations for the World Heritage List are only accepted if the site was previously listed on the tentative list. Lithuania lists one property on its tentative list.

Tentative sites
Site	Image	Location	Year listed	UNESCO criteria	Description
Trakai Historical National Park	Red brick castle in the background. Lake in front. A wooden bridge with tourists. Sailboats on the lake.	Trakai	2003	(mixed)	The Trakai Historical National Park covers a cultural landscape with forests, lakes, moraine hills (which formed after the last ice age), and agricultural areas. These diverse habitats are home to several rare plant and animal species. The human occupancy of the area dates back to the 4000 BCE. The town of Trakai was first mentioned in the 14th century. Two castles have been built for fortifications; the well-preserved Trakai Island Castle and the Trakai Peninsula Castle. Trakai was granted Magdeburg rights in the 15th century. It was a multicultural city, with communities of Karaims, Tatars, Lithuanians, Russians, Jews, and Poles living there.

== See also ==
- Registry of Cultural Property (Lithuania)
