= Vytautas Landsbergis-Žemkalnis =

Lithuanian architect

- Born: 10 March 1893; Linkavičiai, Russian Empire
- Died: 21 May 1993 (aged 100); Vilnius, Lithuania
- Burial place: Petrašiūnai Cemetery
- Other names: Vytautas Landsbergis, Vytautas Žemkalnis
- Education: Riga Polytechnical Institute; Higher School of Architecture in Rome
- Occupation: Architect
- Spouses: Ona Jablonskytė-Landsbergienė; Elena Kurklietienė
- Children: Gabrielius Žemkalnis-Landsbergis; Alena Karazijienė; Vytautas Landsbergis
- Father: Gabrielius Landsbergis-Žemkalnis
- Relatives: Jonas Jablonskis (father-in-law)
- Awards: Order of the Cross of Vytis (1920)

Vytautas Landsbergis-Žemkalnis (10 March 1893 – 21 May 1993) was a Lithuanian architect most active in interwar Lithuania (1926–1939). He was the father of Vytautas Landsbergis, the first Lithuanian head of state after independence from the Soviet Union.

Landsbergis's father, the playwright Gabrielius Landsbergis-Žemkalnis, was an active supporter of the Lithuanian National Revival. Landsbergis studied architecture at the Riga Polytechnical Institute. During World War I, he was drafted into the Imperial Russian Army and completed a school for junior officers. Upon return to Lithuania, he joined the newly established Lithuanian Army and fought in the Lithuanian Wars of Independence. He was taken prisoner by Poland, but managed to escape. He then continued his studies of architecture at the Higher School of Architecture in Rome (now a department of the Sapienza University). Landsbergis returned to Lithuania in 1926 and became one of the most popular and sought-after architects in Kaunas, the temporary capital of Lithuania. He was one of the leaders of a group of about 40 modernist architects working in Kaunas. Eight of his buildings were included in a group 44 buildings awarded the European Heritage Label in 2015. Overall, the modernist architecture of interwar Kaunas has been placed on the UNESCO World Heritage Tentative List in 2017.

When Nazi Germany invaded the Soviet Union and Lithuanians started the anti-Soviet June Uprising, Landsbergis became the minister of infrastructure in the short-lived Provisional Government of Lithuania. When his son Gabrielius was arrested by the Gestapo in May 1944, Landsbergis followed his son from one prison to another until Gabrielius was freed by the Americans in April 1945. Landsbergis became a displaced person (DP) and taught at a Lithuanian DP camp and later at the university of the United Nations Relief and Rehabilitation Administration (UNRRA) in Munich. In 1949, he emigrated to Australia and worked there as an architect at the Housing and Construction Department in Melbourne. In 1959, he returned to Kaunas in Soviet Lithuania and worked as architect and restorer of monuments until retirement in 1984.

== Biography ==
=== Early life and education ===
Landsbergis hailed from an old German Landsberg family that traced its roots to a ministerialis who lived in 1055 at the Werden Abbey. Their last name comes the Landsberg Castle in the Duchy of Berg which translates as "land mountain". Landsbergis' father Gabrielius Landsbergis-Žemkalnis translated the name to Lithuanian and used Žemkalnis as his last name from around 1890. Vytautas Landsbergis was born in the Linkavičiai village near Linkuva where his father worked on supervising the estates of the Karp family.

The family supported the Lithuanian National Revival and their house was visited by various Lithuanian intellectuals, including Vincas Kudirka, Jonas Jablonskis, Pranas Mašiotas, Liudas Vaineikis, Antanas Kriščiukaitis, Jurgis Bielinis. In 1894, due to suspicions about his father's involvement in the Lithuanian book smuggling activities, the family was forced to leave Lithuania. They settled in Moscow where Landsbergis attended the 9th (Medvednikovskaya) Gymnasium from 1901. Due to his Lithuanian activities, his father was imprisoned for ten weeks in Liepāja in 1900 and sentenced to two years of exile in Smolensk in 1902.

The family returned to Lithuania in 1904 and lived in Vilnius. Landsbergis attended Vilnius Real Gymnasium until 1908 when his cousin-in-law Pranas Mašiotas helped him transfer to Riga Gymnasium where he worked as a math teacher. After graduation in 1913, encouraged by Mašiotas, Landsbergis decided to study architecture at the Riga Polytechnical Institute. In 1915, during World War I, the institute was evacuated to Moscow.

=== Military service ===
Landsbergis was drafted to the Imperial Russian Army in 1916 and completed a school for junior officers. Due to disobedience, he was arrested and imprisoned until the October Revolution.

Landsbergis returned to Lithuania in June 1918 and volunteered for the newly established Lithuanian Army. As an artillery captain, he participated in the Lithuanian Wars of Independence and saw action at Daugava River, Radviliškis, and Sejny. He was taken prisoner by Poland near Sejny and sent to a camp near Wadowice. Together with two other officers, Landsbergis escaped and returned to Lithuania via Czechoslovakia. For his military service, he was awarded the Order of the Cross of Vytis.

=== Interwar Lithuania ===
In April 1922, he left the army and took a technical job at the Ministry of Transport. One of his tasks was transporting Lithuanian gold reserves from Berlin. Together with poet Faustas Kirša and future Minister of Foreign Affairs Juozas Urbšys, Landsbergis transported the gold in ordinary luggage. He felt the need for further education and attempted to study in Kaunas, Prague, Berlin, until he enrolled into the Higher School of Architecture in Rome (Regia Scuola Superiore di Architettura, now a department of the Sapienza University) in January 1923. He received financial aid from the Žiburėlis Society. He completed his studies in December 1925 and received his diploma in July 1926. His diploma project was an eye clinic in the Alban Hills near Rome. The diploma was not recognized in Lithuania until 1932.

Landsbergis returned to Lithuania in 1926. His first project was a water tower in Kaišiadorys. He discovered that the initial winning architect was also a member of the judge panel; it caused a controversy and Landsbergis' work was eventually selected as the winner. Landsbergis became one of the most popular and sought-after architects in Kaunas, the temporary capital of Lithuania. He worked as a junior engineer at the Ministry of Transport (1926–1927), junior assistant of Mykolas Songaila at the University of Lithuania (1927–1929), consultant at the Ministry of Agriculture (1929–1931), architect of the Lithuanian Red Cross Society (1933–1938) and of the Amerikos lietuvių akcinė bendrovė (Lithuanian American Joint Stock Company; 1938–1939). At the same time, he took on many private clients. It was a profitable profession enabling Landsbergis to drive in a Chrysler automobile and construct a two-floor personal residence which also housed his wife's medical practice.

When Lithuania gained Vilnius as a result of the Soviet–Lithuanian Mutual Assistance Treaty in October 1939, Landsbergis became the chief engineer of Vilnius. He helped Balys Dvarionas organizing the Lithuanian National Symphony Orchestra in 1940 and prepared a project for a 1,200-seat opera and ballet theater (it was not constructed). After Lithuania was occupied by the Soviet Union in June 1940, Landsbergis became the chief architect of Vilnius.

=== Nazi occupation ===
When Nazi Germany invaded the Soviet Union and Lithuanians started the anti-Soviet June Uprising, Landsbergis became the minister of infrastructure in the short-lived Provisional Government of Lithuania. He continued to work as chief of the city's construction board which prepared Vilnius' general plan in January 1944. During his tenure, the city began construction of a road to Kaunas as well as reconstruction of the Cathedral Square and the present-day Daukanto Square. These were not new initiatives, but a continuation of pre-war Polish projects. In 1942–1943, he also taught at Vilnius University.

There is some evidence that he was in contact with the anti-Nazi resistance (e.g. with Juozas Vitas). His wife Ona Jablonskytė-Landsbergienė who remained in Kaunas and, without his knowledge, helped hide 16-year old Jewish girl Bella Gurvich (later Rozenberg) and was recognized as one of the Righteous Among the Nations in 1995. Additionally, Ona assisted her sister's family in sheltering a Jewish child, Avivit Kissin, from the Holocaust. She brought Kissin to her sister's home and produced a forged birth certificate with a Lithuanian for Kissin. Her sister and brother-in-law were named Righteous Among the Nations. His son Gabrielius together with his classmates Valdas Adamkus (future President of Lithuania) and Liūtas Grinius (son of the former President Kazys Grinius) published 16 issues of anti-Nazi Jaunime, budėk! (Youth, Stay Alert!). Gabrielius was arrested by the Gestapo in May 1944. Together with 26 other Lithuanians, some of them leaders of the Supreme Committee for the Liberation of Lithuania, he was transferred from one prison to another. Landsbergis followed his son's journey, smuggled him food, and petitioned Nazi officials (including Alfred Rosenberg, his acquaintance from the Riga Polytechnical Institute and the Reich Minister for the Occupied Eastern Territories). Gabrielius and other Lithuanian prisoners were eventually freed by the Americans in Bayreuth in April 1945. Landsbergis published a memoir about his efforts to free his son in 1991.

He became a displaced person (DP) and worked as a teacher at a Lithuanian DP camp in Rebdorf in Eichstätt. In 1946–1949, he taught at the university of the United Nations Relief and Rehabilitation Administration (UNRRA) in Munich. In 1949, he emigrated to Australia and worked there as an architect at the Housing and Construction Department in Melbourne. Some of the projects he worked on include the embassy of Australia in New Delhi, hospital in Port Moresby (Papua New Guinea), government administrative building in Melbourne, tax office in Brisbane, factory for Burghart Hurle and Associates. He was also active with the Lithuanian Australian community.

=== Return to Soviet Lithuania ===
In 1959, he returned to Kaunas in Soviet Lithuania and worked as architect and restorer of monuments. From 1961 until retirement in 1984, he worked as an architect at the Institute for the Conservation of Monuments (Paminklų konservavimo institutas) first in Kaunas and since 1970 in Vilnius. Many of the projects from this period remained unrealized. In 1966, Landsbergis donated his archives (more than 2,000 files) to the Lithuanian Archives of Literature and Art making one of the most comprehensive and complete architectural archives in Lithuania.

In 1973, for this 80th birthday, an exhibition was organized in his honor at the Arts Exhibition Palace and he was named the Honored Architect of the Lithuanian SSR. In 1991, he was recognized as the honorary citizen of Kaunas. In 1993, his 100th birthday was celebrated by the Lithuanian Union of Architects with a ceremony at the National Library of Lithuania and an exhibition at the Lithuanian Art Museum. The same year, Science and Encyclopedia Press published a monograph by Jolita Kančienė and Jonas Minkevičius about Landsbergis. Landsbergis died on 21 May 1993 in Vilnius and was buried in the Petrašiūnai Cemetery in Kaunas. In 1993, the former Architect Street in Eiguliai district of Kaunas was renamed in his honor. Another monograph about Landsbergis was published in 1997 by Algimantas Nakas. Another exhibition showcasing Landsbergis' works was organized in 2018.

== Selected Works ==
Landsbergis prepared over a hundred architectural projects. Many of his works are plain, without decoration, but expertly balancing proportions. He designed the buildings so that they would fit into their natural and architectural surroundings.

In 2015, 44 modernist buildings in Kaunas received the European Heritage Label. Of these buildings, eight were designed by Landsbergis:

Image	Title	Year	Location	County	Description
	Vilkaviškis Priest Seminary	1927	Vilkaviškis	Marijampolė	
	Catholic Church of Christ the Redeemer	1928	Kybartai	Marijampolė	
	House for painter Antanas Žmuidzinavičius	1928	Kaunas	Kaunas	Recipient of the European Heritage Label
	Eye, Ear, and Throat Clinic	1929	Kaunas	Kaunas	At the Vytautas Magnus University
	Reconstruction of the Presidential Palace in Kaunas	1929	Kaunas	Kaunas	
	Reconstruction of Kaunas State Theatre	1930	Kaunas	Kaunas	
	Maironis Street 13 Residential House	1930	Kaunas	Kaunas	For businessman Moze Chaimsonas, recipient of the European Heritage Label
	Gymnasium	1930	Biržai	Panevėžys	
	Headquarters of Pienocentras	1931	Kaunas	Kaunas	Awarded bronze medal in an international exhibition in Paris in 1937, recipient of the European Heritage Label.
	Apostolic Nunciature of the Holy See	1931	Kaunas	Kaunas	Present-day Kaunas Artists' House, recipient of the European Heritage Label.
	Physical Culture Palace	1931	Kaunas	Kaunas	Present-day Lithuanian Sports University, recipient of the European Heritage Label.
	Gymnasium	1931	Panevėžys	Panevėžys	
	Shelter for Priests	1931	Marijampolė	Marijampolė	
	Ministry of Defence Research Laboratory	1932-1936	Kaunas	Kaunas	Present-day Faculty of Chemical Technology of Kaunas University of Technology, recipient of the European Heritage Label.
	District Municipality offices	1933	Kaunas	Kaunas	Present-day Kaunas Police Headquarters, recipient of the European Heritage Label.
	Monument	1934	Near Myślibórz	West Pomerania, Poland	To pilots Steponas Darius and Stasys Girėnas
	Mausoleum	1934	Ramybė Park, Kaunas	Kaunas	To pilots Steponas Darius and Stasys Girėnas
	Catholic Church of St. John the Baptist	1934	Šakiai	Marijampolė	
	Catholic Church of the Sacred heart of Jesus	1935	Mažeikiai	Telšiai	
	General plan for the Smeltė district	1936	Klaipėda	Klaipėda	132 houses and a trade school were constructed; plans for a Catholic church, market, and theater were interrupted by World War II
	Chamber of Commerce, Industry and Crafts	1937	Kaunas	Kaunas	Recipient of the European Heritage Label.
	Pedagogical Institute	1937	Klaipėda	Klaipėda	
	Hospital	1939	Švėkšna	Klaipėda	
	Hospital	1939	Šiauliai	Šiauliai	
	Reconstruction of a block in Vilnius Old Town	1961	Vilnius	Vilnius	With others, the first such plan in post-war Vilnius, the exteriors would remain the same, but interiors would be significantly modernized.
	Reconstruction of Old Arsenal, Vilnius Castle	1975	Vilnius	Vilnius	With others

In addition to public buildings, Landsbergis prepared projects for several private homes, some of them for the famous Lithuanians: writers Sofija Kymantaitė-Čiurlionienė (1932), Antanas Žukauskas-Vienuolis (1937), Pranas Mašiotas (1931), economist Petras Šalčius (1930), and others.
