= Kaunas Mosque =

Mosque in Centras, Kaunas, Lithuania

- Lithuanian: Kauno mečetė
- The mosque, in May 2019

- Location of the mosque in Lithuania

Religion
- Affiliation: Sunni Islam
- Ecclesiastical or organizational status: Mosque
- Ownership: Kauno Miesto Musulmonų Religinė Bendruomenė
- Status: Active

Location
- Location: Centras, Kaunas City, Kaunas County
- Country: Lithuania
- Interactive map of Kaunas Mosque
- Coordinates: 54°53′39″N 23°55′41″E

Architecture
- Architects: Adolfas Netyksas; Wacław Michniewicz
- Type: Mosque architecture
- Style: Modernist (1933)
- Groundbreaking: 1930 (brick mosque)
- Completed: 15th century (first mosque); 1906 (wooden mosque); 1933 (brick mosque)

Specifications
- Direction of façade: North
- Dome: One
- Minaret: One
- Minaret height: 19 m (62 ft)
- Materials: Bricks; concrete

UNESCO World Heritage Site
- Official name: Modernist Kaunas: Architecture of Optimism, 1919-1939
- Type: Cultural
- Criteria: iv
- Designated: 2023 (45th session)
- Reference no.: 1661
- UNESCO region: Europe

The Kaunas Mosque (Lithuanian: Kauno mečetė) is a World Heritage-listed Sunni Islamic mosque, located at Tatars Street 6 (Lithuanian: Totorių g. 6), in the Centras eldership of Kaunas, Lithuania. It is the only mosque in the Kaunas district, one of only four mosques in Lithuania, and the only brick mosque in Lithuania and the Baltic countries.

== History ==
The history of the Islamic community of Kaunas can be traced to the arrival of Muslim Lipka Tatars in the Grand Duchy of Lithuania in the 15th century.

=== Cemetery ===
The former Muslim cemetery is located in Ramybė Park, which was previously the Kaunas Old Cemetery from 1847 to 1959, divided between four religions: Islam, Catholicism, Lutheranism, and Eastern Orthodoxy.

The territory of the Muslim Cemetery was divided into two parts:

- The first complex was a cemetery. The graveyard was initially dedicated for Tatar Muslims. Besides the graves of the deceased members of the local Tatar community, there were about 100 graves of Turkish soldiers who died in captivity in Kaunas during the Russo-Turkish War of 1877–78. Also, in another part of the graveyard, behind the wooden mosque, German soldiers who died during World War I were buried there.
- The second complex was a wooden mosque, a house where the Imam lived, and a school with a garden.

=== Wooden mosque ===
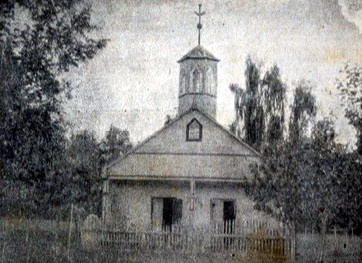
The wooden mosque

Originally there was a wooden mosque on the banks of the Neman river. However, during French invasion of Russia in the winter of 1812, Napoleonic troops crossed the city of Kaunas and set the wooden building afire. Since then, the Muslim Tatars had no common place of worship in Kaunas, until 1906 when Alexander Illasevich (Lithuanian: Aleksandras Iljasevičius) (1853–1925), a citizen of Kaunas of Tatar descent, obtained permission from the Russian government to build the new mosque. He built a wooden mosque as a memorial to his dead parents who were buried in the graveyard.

The wooden mosque's exterior was an undecorated, blue-painted 10 m-long (33 ft) and 8 m-wide (26 ft) timber construction. It had no minaret, instead only a small tower adorned the roof peg with the symbol of the golden crescent with a star. There was also no front court, instead a two-meter deep, fenced-off front yard set behind the double-door entrance which was decorated with a memorial plaque, with the Muslim testimony of faith Shahada written on it: lā ʾilāha ʾillā -llāhu muḥammadun rasūlu -llāhi (There is no deity but Allah, Muhammad is the messenger of Allah).

On the interior, the left door lead to a narrow, not even 2.5 m^{2} (27 sq ft) large, prayer room for women that was connected through a slim glass window with the main prayer room. Through the right door was the men's entrance. It was a room that was decorated with friendly shining colourful pictures on both sides, as well as colourful boards. It resembled a living room. On the boards were calligraphically written names of Allah and Muhammad as well as many Quranic verses. From the ceiling hanged a colourfully decorated chandelier-shaped draw lamp. The floor was covered with beautiful carpets. Near the entrance were two benches where the worshippers could sit to remove their shoes. Despite that, there were no places to sit elsewhere.

The Tatar community of Kaunas counted about 120 members at the beginning of 20th century. Nevertheless, the prayers well attended, because among the Russian garrison of the Kaunas Fortress were 2000 Muslim soldiers, who visited the mosques on Fridays.

=== Brick mosque ===
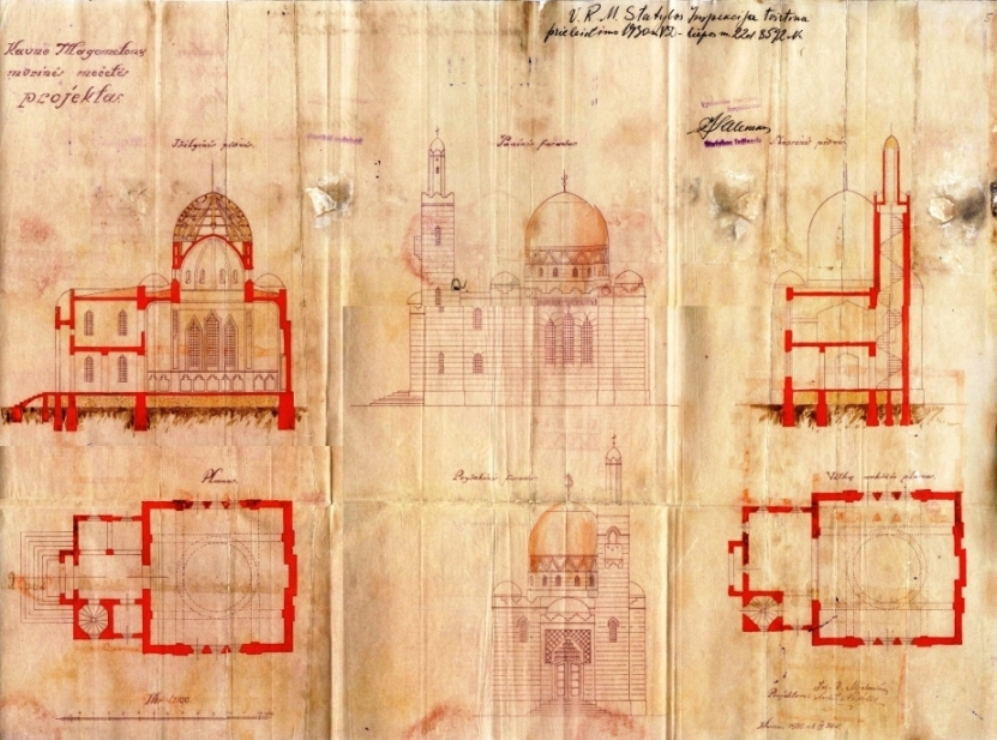
New Kaunas mosque construction project

In 1930, the wooden mosque was replaced, with the aid of the state of Lithuania, by a brick mosque. At that time, Kaunas was the Temporary capital of Lithuania. Kaunas Mosque was rebuilt in commemoration of the 500th death anniversary of Vytautas the Great, the Grand Duke of Lithuania who is credited for settling Lipka Tatars in Lithuania.

The mosque was designed by Vaclovas Michnevičius (1866-1947) and Adolfas Netyksas, who followed a modernist style with respect to the elements of Islamic architecture. Construction of the new mosque started in 1930 and was completed in 1933. The mosque was small, its first floor is for men and the second floor, for women, and it has a minaret and a dome. Various oriental elements were visible on the facade of building as well as inside, the mosque was decorated with various paints and oriental ornaments.

==== Later history ====
During World War II, the Mosque was closed and was robbed. Religious activities ran after the war until 1947, when the Mosque's ownership was transferred to the Municipality of Kaunas.

During the Soviet times, the building was used for a circus and a library. There were plans to establish a museum of Islamic/Oriental art. The mosque's external appearance is similar to its original appearance, but, all the internal decorations were replaced with the passage of the time.

In 1989, Kaunas Mosque was returned to the congregation. In 1991 the first worship was held. Since the independence of Lithuania, the Kaunas City Muslim Religious Community (Lithuanian: Kauno Miesto Musulmonų Religinė Bendruomenė) owns the mosque. Kaunas City Muslim Religious Community has been a member of the Council of Lithuanian Muslim Religious Communities - Muftiate since 2019.

In 2018, the mosque of Kaunas was completely renovated, financed by the Turkish Cooperation and Coordination Agency. The Department of Cultural Heritage under the Ministry of Culture supervised the renovation of the interior and exterior of the mosque.

== Religious activities ==
From 2012 to 2019, the Muslim community of Kaunas city was unable to provide the religious responsible from within the community. To establish the main daily prayers and other religious activities, the local community agreed with the Directorate of Religious Affairs (Turkish: Diyanet) of Turkey to accept Imams, thus three assigned imams officiated during this period. In 2019 a local Imam was appointed by the Muslim Community of Kaunas.

Most believers who visit the mosque are foreign students from throughout the world who study in Kaunas' universities and businessmen from Central Asia. The Friday sermons - Khutbah - are given by different Khateeb in English, Arabic and Lithuanian. The mosque is open for the five daily prayers.

== See also ==
- Islam in Lithuania
- List of mosques in Lithuania
