= Kaunas Maironis University Gymnasium =

Kaunas Maironis Academic Gymnasium in Lithuania

Kaunas Maironis Academic Gymnasium
- Kauno Maironio universitetinė gimnazija

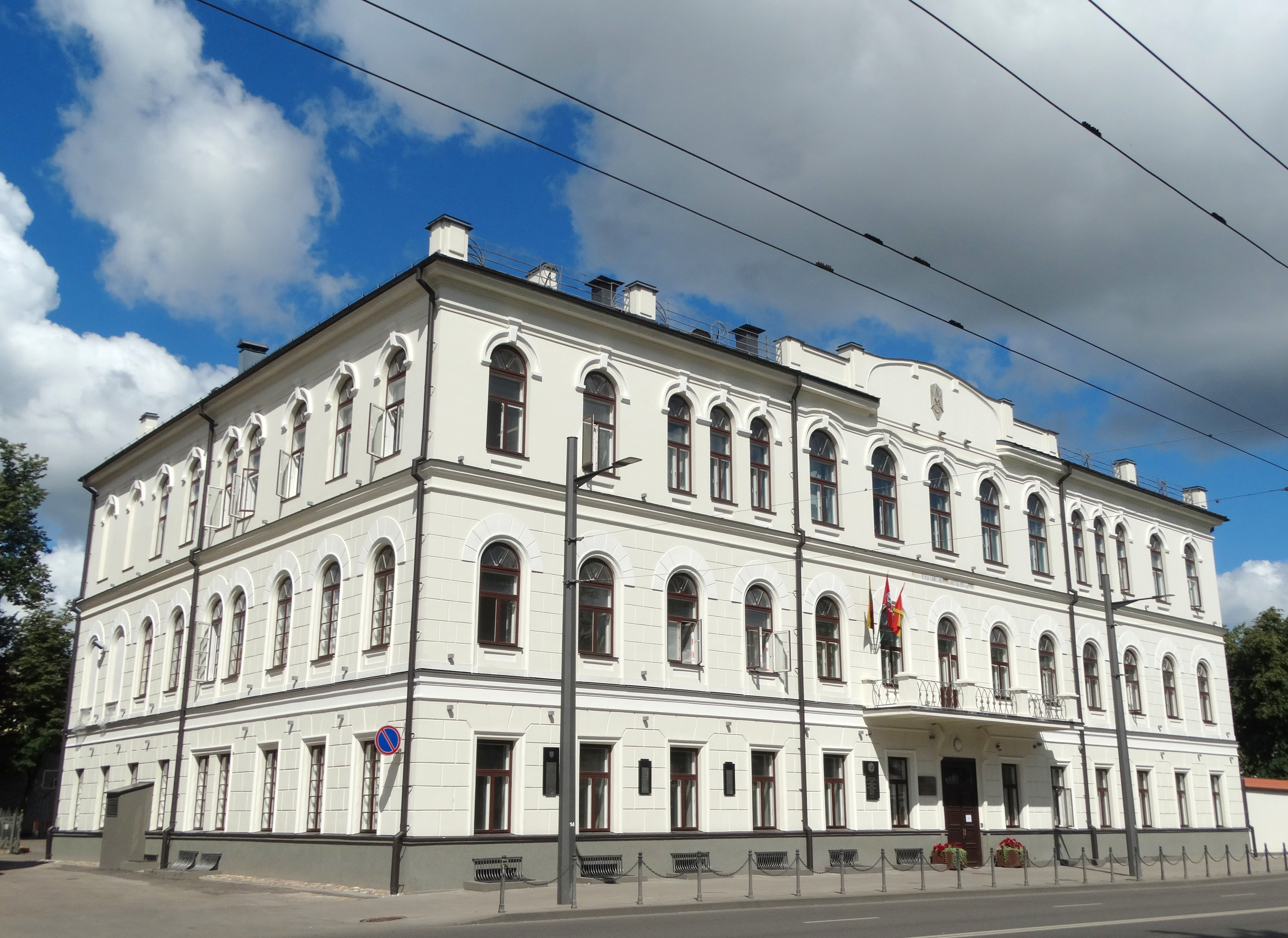

General information
- Status: Currently used as Kaunas Maironis Academic Gymnasium
- Type: School
- Architectural style: 19th century historicism, 20th century modernism
- Location: Kaunas, Lithuania
- Address: Gimnazijos st. 3
- Coordinates: 54°53′50″N 23°53′44″E
- Inaugurated: 1862

Technical details
- Floor count: 3

Design and construction
- Architect(s): Nikolay Chagin

Website
- www.kmug.lt

Kaunas Maironis Academic Gymnasium (Lithuanian: Kauno Maironio universitetinė gimnazija), previously the Constituent Assembly Palace (Lithuanian: Steigiamojo Seimo rūmai), is an historical building in Kaunas, Lithuania. The building was completed in 1862 and in 1863 the gymnasium was moved into it, but the building gained its greatest significance between 1920 and 1927 when the Constituent Assembly of Lithuania met there, as well as the interwar Seimas for its first three electoral periods. The Seimas was later moved to the newly built Palace of Justice and the Seimas.

The Kaunas Maironis Academic Gymnasium is the oldest operational school in Kaunas and celebrated its 150th anniversary in 2023.

== Gallery ==
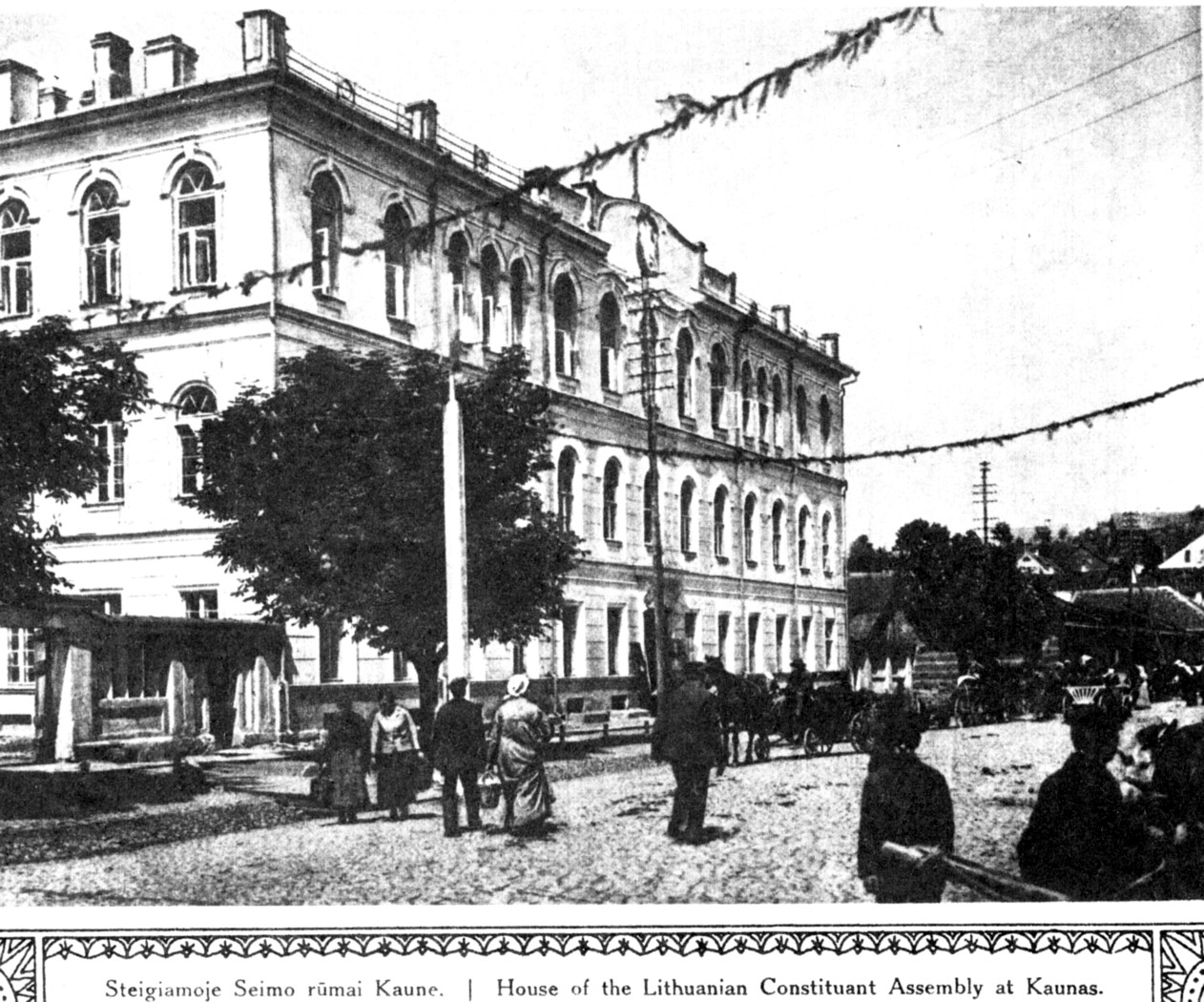
The Constituent Assembly Palace (1921)

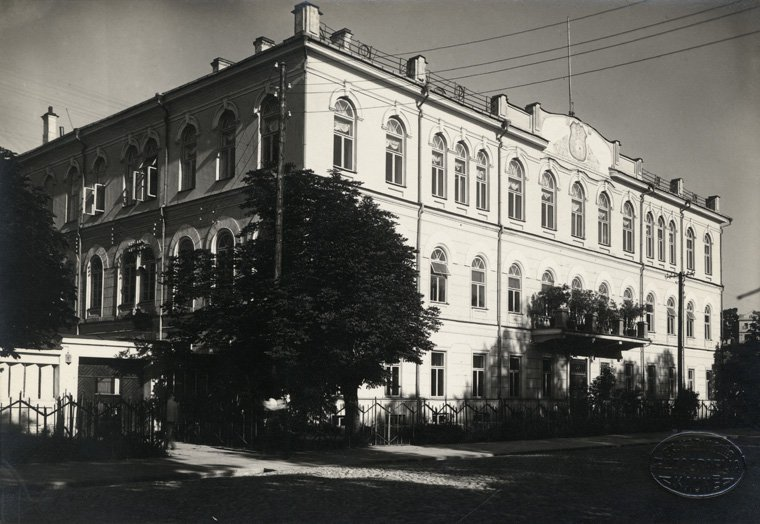
The Constituent Assembly Palace (between 1930 and 1940)

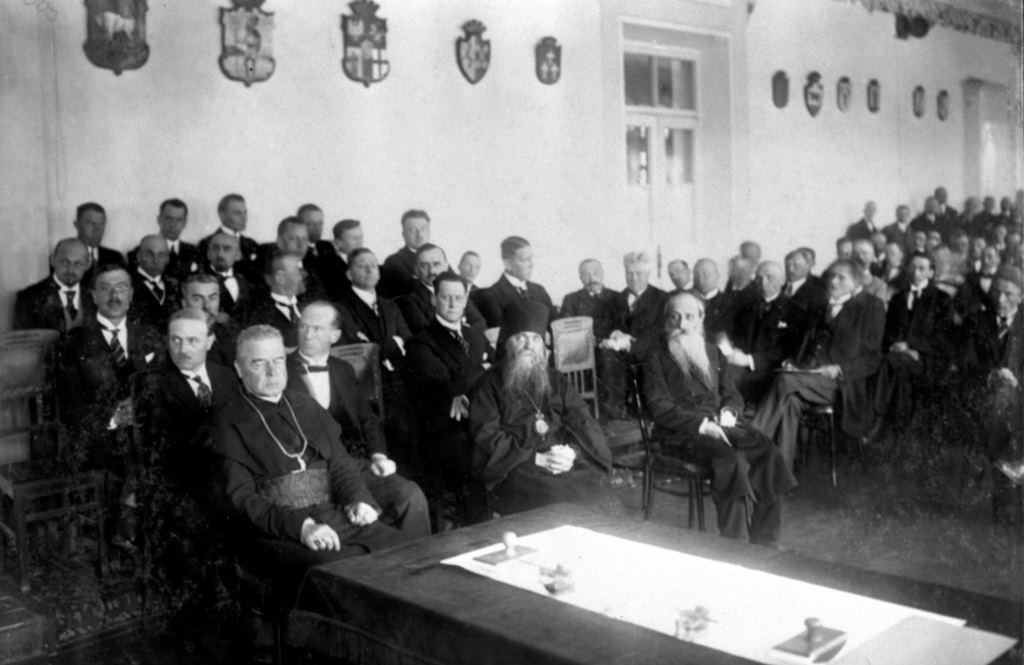
Second Seimas of Lithuania opening meeting in 1923

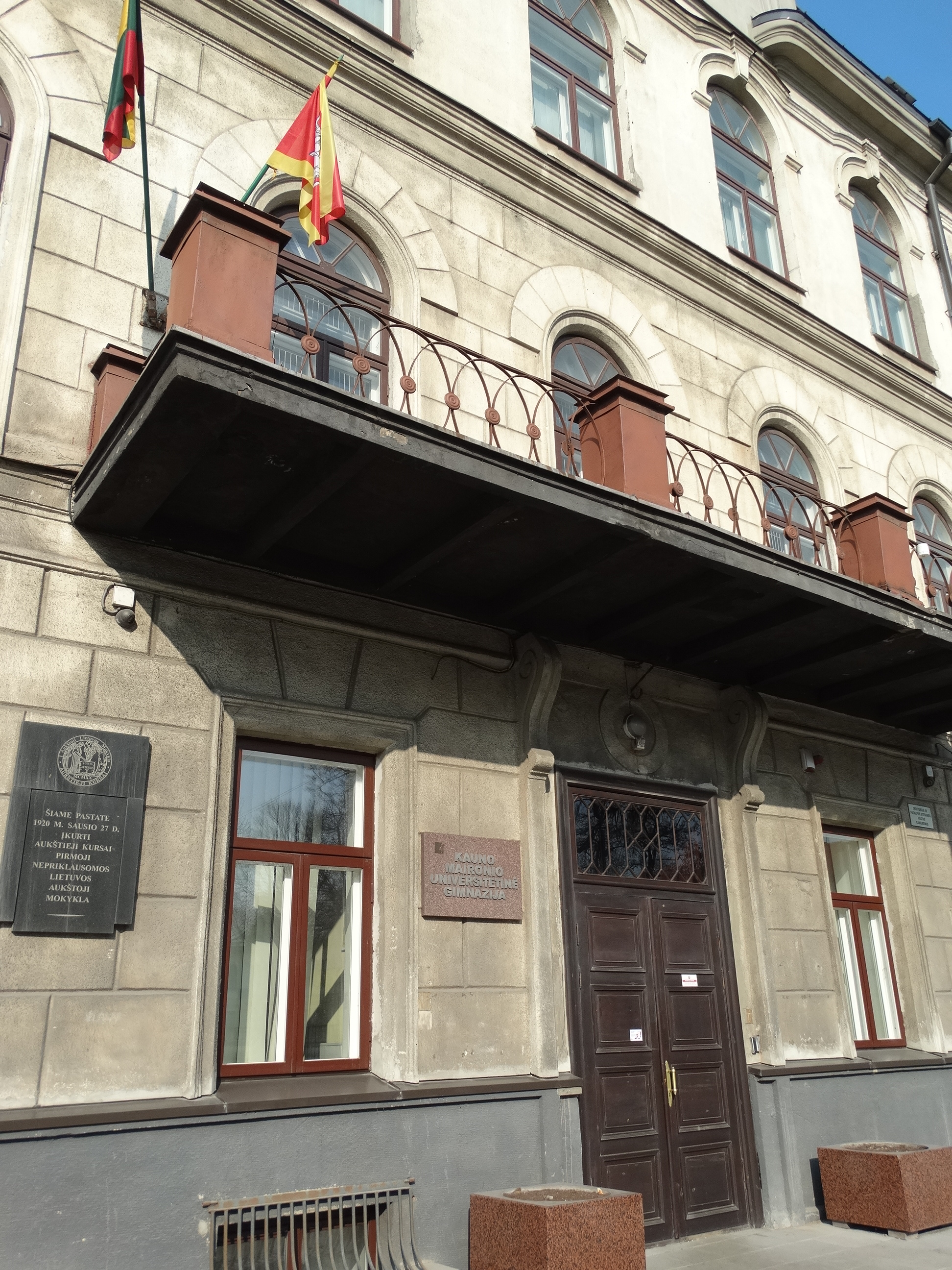
Main entrance (2017)

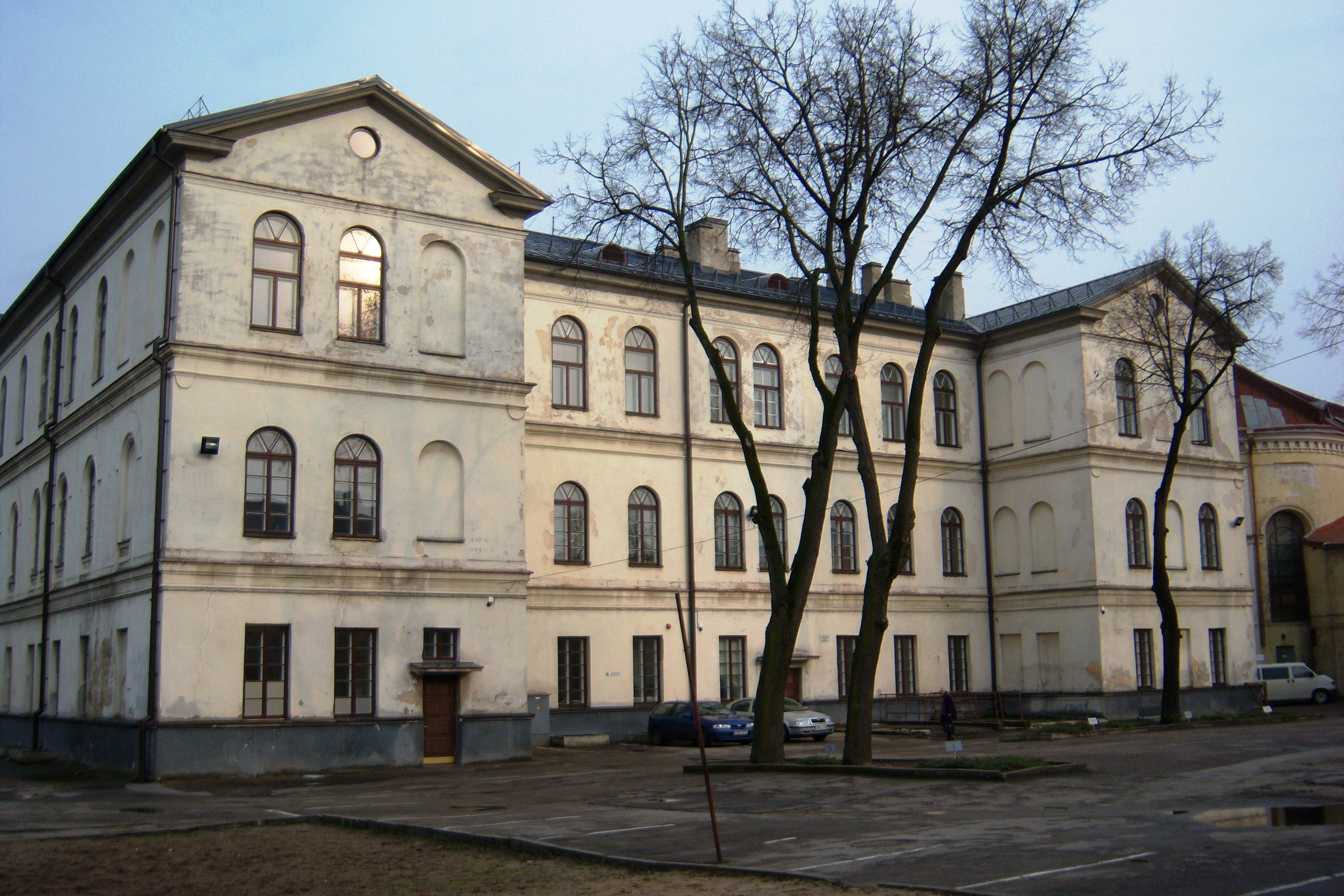
Gymnasium from the courtyard (2014)
