= Romuva Cinema =

- Romuvos kino teatras

- Interactive map of the Romuva Cinema area

General information
- Status: Operational
- Type: Movie theater
- Architectural style: Art Deco, Functionalism / Modernism
- Location: Kaunas, Lithuania, Laisvės alėja 54
- Coordinates: 54.897747°N 23.915646°E
- Groundbreaking: February 3, 1939
- Completed: April 13, 1940
- Renovated: 2008
- Cost: 200,000 litas

Technical details
- Material: Masonry (brick), Ferroconcrete

Design and construction
- Architect: Nikolajus Mačiulskis

Website
- www.kcromuva.lt

UNESCO World Heritage Site
- Official name: Modernist Kaunas: Architecture of Optimism, 1919-1939
- Type: Cultural
- Criteria: iv
- Designated: 2023 (45th session)
- Reference no.
- UNESCO region: Europe

Romuva Cinema (Lithuanian: Romuvos kino teatras) is the oldest still operational cinema theater in Lithuania. The building was designed by the architect Nikolajus Mačiulskis and was completed on April 13, 1940.

The cinema was closed on April 15, 2007. The Kaunas International Film Festival played a crucial role in rescuing the Romuva Cinema and ensuring the continuation of film exhibition in this cinema space.

In 2015, the building was one of 44 objects in Kaunas to receive the European Heritage Label. The building was reconstructed in 2016–2021, however authentic details from the 1940s have also been preserved.
