= Bank of Lithuania building in Kaunas =

The Bank of Lithuania building in Kaunas
- Lietuvos banko rūmai Kaune
- Façade of the building
- Interactive map of The Bank of Lithuania building in Kaunas

General information
- Status: Belongs to and is used by the Bank of Lithuania
- Type: Bank building
- Architectural style: National style, Neoclassicism and Art Deco
- Location: Kaunas, Lithuania, Maironio St. 25 / K. Donelaitis St. 85
- Coordinates: 54°53′56.4″N 23°54′34.1″E
- Groundbreaking: 1925
- Inaugurated: 1928
- Cost: 3 million LTL

Technical details
- Material: Masonry (brick), Ferroconcrete

Design and construction
- Architect: Mykolas Songaila

Website
- www.Lb.lt

UNESCO World Heritage Site
- Official name: Modernist Kaunas: Architecture of Optimism, 1919-1939
- Type: Cultural
- Criteria: iv
- Designated: 2023 (45th session)
- Reference no.
- UNESCO region: Europe

The Bank of Lithuania building in Kaunas (Lithuanian: Lietuvos banko rūmai Kaune) is a building in Lithuania's second largest city Kaunas. The building was designed by architect Mykolas Songaila and its construction was completed in 1928. The construction of the building cost 3 million Lithuanian litas, which at the time was worth one ton of gold. In the interwar period the building served as the main headquarters of the central Bank of Lithuania and is known for its sumptuous interior and decorative exterior of Neoclassicism and Art Deco architectural styles and Lithuanian national motifs.

The building also had a flat dedicated to the Prime Minister of Lithuania, which for a long-term was used by Prime Minister Augustinas Voldemaras.

Following the Soviet occupation of Lithuania in 1940 the Bank of Lithuania and its properties were nationalized by the Soviet Union, however after the Re-Establishment of the State of Lithuania the building since 1991 again belongs to and is used by the Bank of Lithuania as its local branch.

On September 23, 2023, the building together with other examples of the interwar period Modernist architecture of Kaunas were recognized as the UNESCO World Heritage Site.

== Gallery ==
Transactions Hall in the interwar period

Details of the eastern façade

One of the main entrance doors

Northeastern corner of the building

Details of the northern façade
