= Church of the Most Sacred Heart of Jesus, Kaunas =

Roman Catholic church in Kaunas, Lithuania

Church of the Most Sacred Heart of Jesus Švč. Jėzaus Širdies bažnyčia
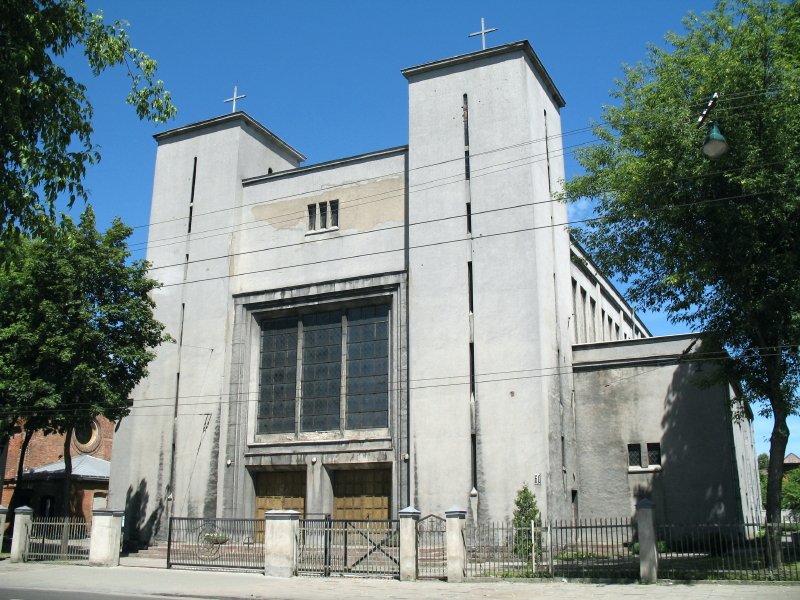
- Main façade of the church

Religion
- Affiliation: Roman Catholic
- Diocese: Šančiai
- Ecclesiastical or organizational status: Operational
- Leadership: Roman Catholic Archdiocese of Kaunas

Location
- Location: Kaunas, Lithuania
- Interactive map of Church of the Most Sacred Heart of Jesus; Švč. Jėzaus Širdies bažnyčia
- Coordinates: 54°52′43″N 23°56′35″E

Architecture
- Architects: Algirdas Šalkauskis, Adolfas Netyksa, Pranas Markūnas
- Type: Church
- Style: Functionalism/Modern
- Groundbreaking: 1935
- Completed: 1938

Specifications
- Spire: 2
- Materials: Masonry (brick), Ferroconcrete

Website
- kaunoarkivyskupija.lt

Church of the Most Sacred Heart of Jesus (Lithuanian: Švč. Jėzaus Širdies bažnyčia) is a Roman Catholic church in Šančiai elderate of Kaunas, Lithuania.

The church is characterised by its monumentality, its austere exterior forms and restrained interior. It is a significant and rare example of modern interwar sacred architecture in Lithuania. Innovative reinforced concrete structures were used in the construction of the church. The thin-walled shell roof structure (one of the first in Lithuania) was designed by engineer P. Markūnas. The church is rectangular in plan, massive, with two low towers and two sacristies at the side facades, which form a composition of regular geometric shapes. The roof is pitched and of reinforced concrete shell construction. The roof covering is made of tin sheets. The façades of the building have recessed stained-glass window openings, a profiled multi-paned surround in the central part of the front wall, and a cornice crowning the eaves. The interior is a basilican space of 3 bays, with narrow side aisles and galleries on the first floor and two narrow staircases. The cylindrical vault of the ceiling is formed by diagonal cross-beams forming 121 rhombic caissons (recesses).

== Gallery ==
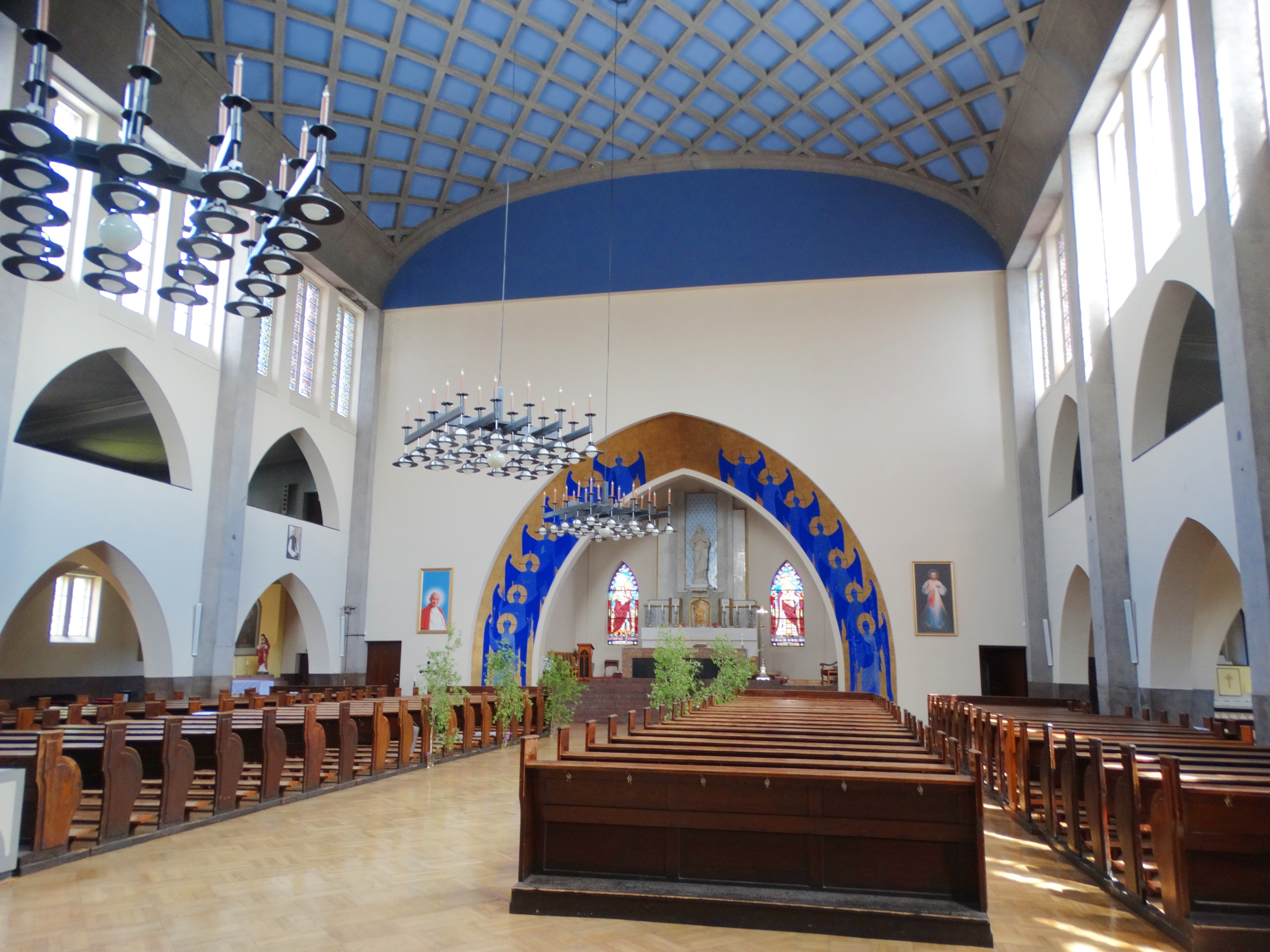
Interior of the church

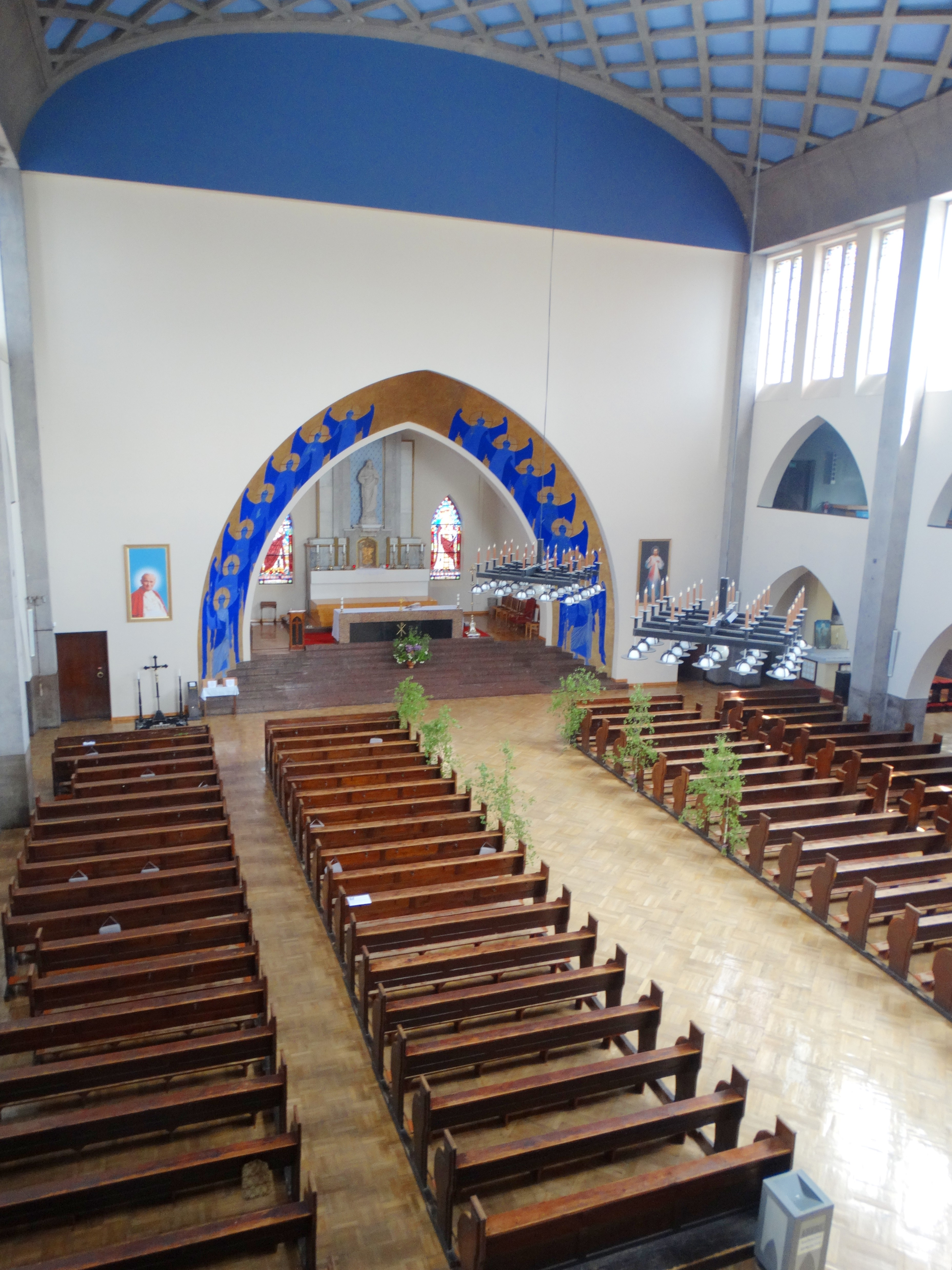
Main nave

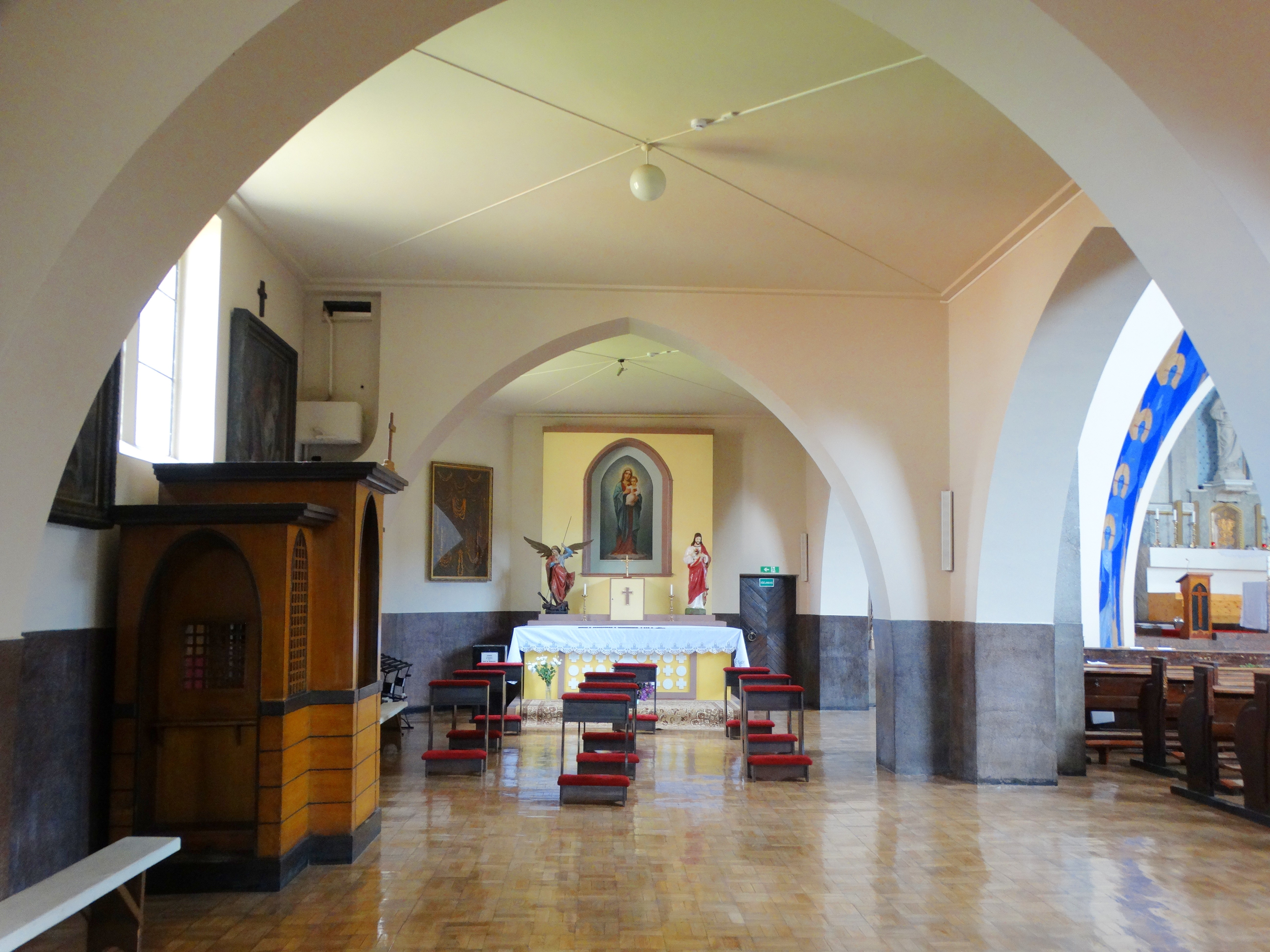
Side nave

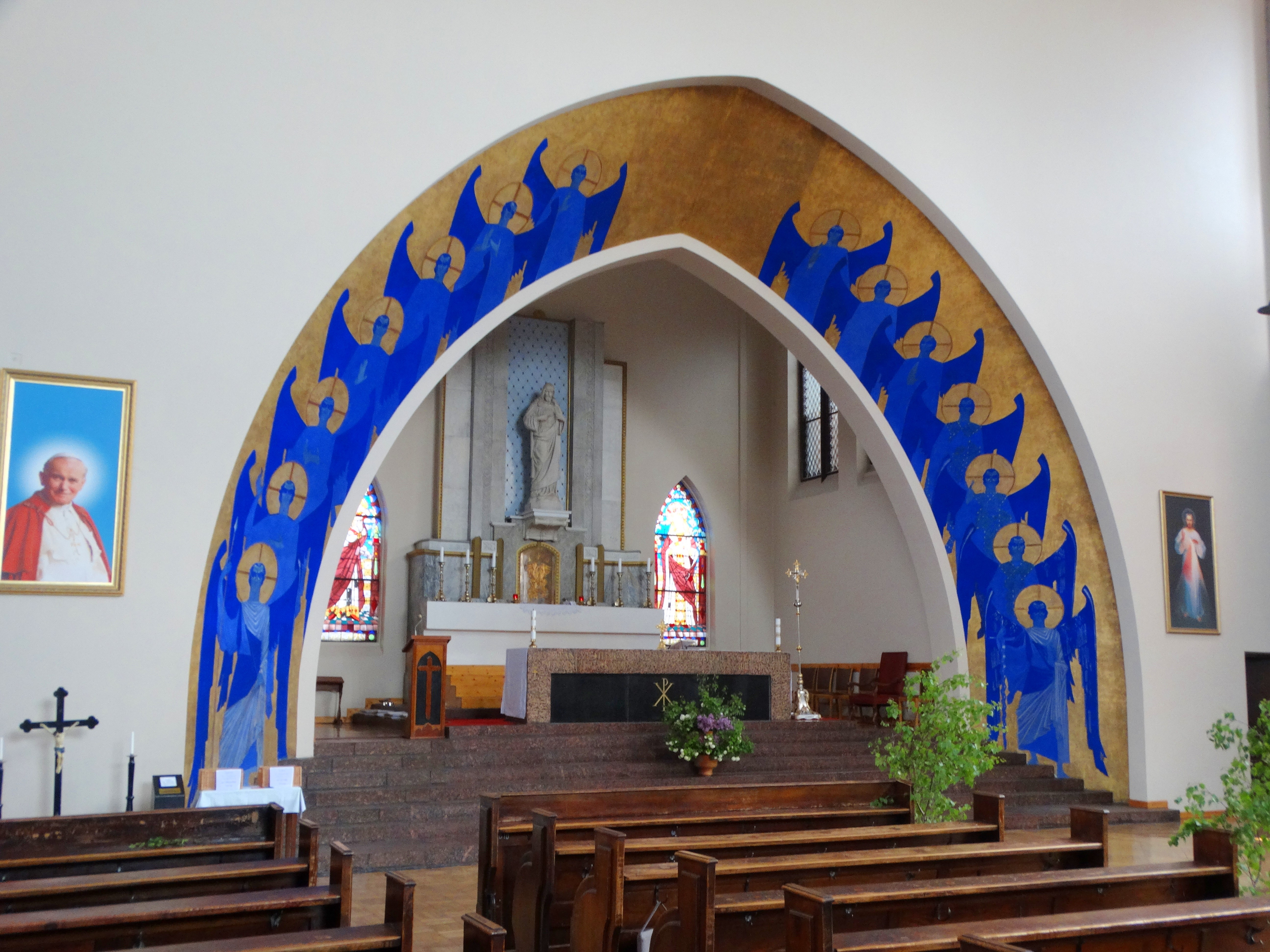
Altar and chancel separated by an arch

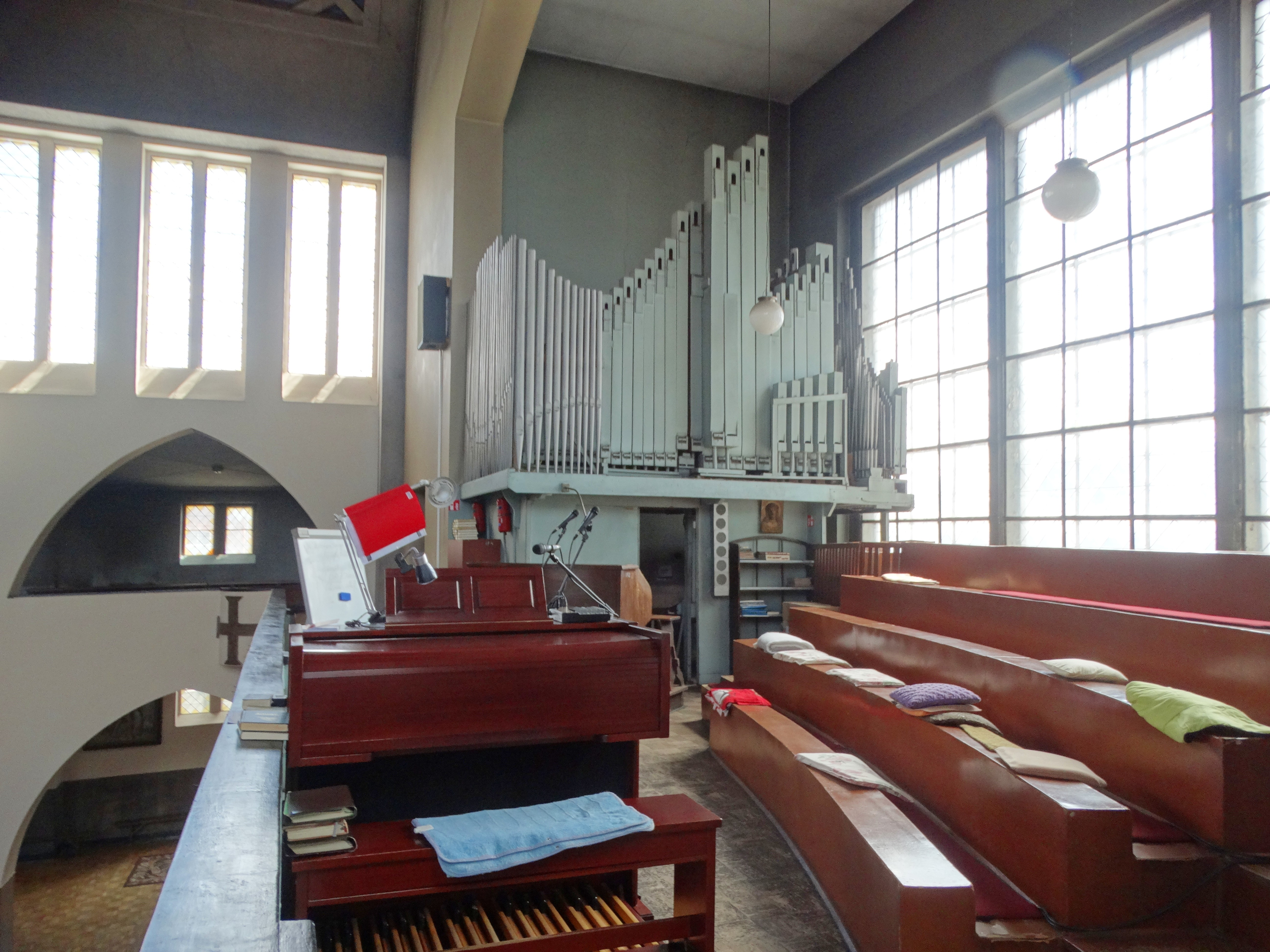
Organ and place for the choristers
