= Christ's Resurrection Basilica, Kaunas =

Roman Catholic church in Kaunas, Lithuania

Our Lord Jesus Christ's Resurrection Basilica Prisikėlimo bazilika
- Side view of the front façade

Religion
- Affiliation: Roman Catholic
- Diocese: Žaliakalnis
- Ecclesiastical or organizational status: Minor basilica
- Year consecrated: 2004

Location
- Location: Kaunas, Lithuania
- Interactive map of Our Lord Jesus Christ's Resurrection Basilica; Prisikėlimo bazilika
- Coordinates: 54.902°N 23.917°E

Architecture
- Architect: Karolis Reisonas
- Type: Church
- Style: Functionalism, Art Deco
- Groundbreaking: 1934
- Completed: 2005
- Construction cost: 878 470 litas until 1940

Specifications
- Direction of façade: Northeast
- Capacity: 5000 and 2000 on the rooftop
- Spire height: 70 m
- Materials: concrete and bricks

Website
- prisikelimas.lt

UNESCO World Heritage Site
- Official name: Modernist Kaunas: Architecture of Optimism, 1919-1939
- Type: Cultural
- Criteria: iv
- Designated: 2023 (45th session)
- Reference no.
- UNESCO region: Europe

Kaunas our Lord Jesus Christ's Resurrection Basilica (Lithuanian: Kauno mūsų Viešpaties Jėzaus Kristaus Prisikėlimo bazilika) is a monumental Roman Catholic minor basilica in Kaunas, Lithuania. The church was consecrated in 2004, and in 2005 it was finally completed. It is the largest basilical church in the Baltic states.

== History ==
Distant view of the basilica

View on the roof of the basilica

The main tower of the basilica

After Lithuania regained independence in 1918, the concept of a new church that would express gratitude to God for its regained freedom arose. A committee led by President Antanas Smetona was established in 1926 to oversee its construction. The City of Kaunas was chosen as its site, since the historic capital of Lithuania, Vilnius, was part of Poland between 1920 and 1939, meanwhile Kaunas served as a temporary capital. In 1928, the city municipality donated a plot of land for the construction of the church. A design competition was held in the same year, and the proposal drawn up by Karolis Reisonas was chosen for the church as the best. Due to the technical difficulties arising from the grand scope of the design and dramatic escalation of its cost estimates, the final design was not approved until 1933.

The first cornerstone for the church was brought from Jerusalem's Mount of Olives in 1934, marking the church's first symbolic milestone. Funds for the construction were raised in Lithuania and abroad. The prominent Lithuanian parson Feliksas Kapočius was particularly involved not only in the details of the building project, but also in its funding. He travelled through the United States, where many Lithuanian émigrés were living, to enlist support. The construction project underwent several setbacks and was suspended at times due to a lack of funding.

In 1938, the walls and roof of the church were completed, and by 1940, it was largely finished; at this point, around one million litas had been spent, most of it from individual donations. Once completed, the church was intended to become a national pantheon, with specially equipped underground crypts designed to house the remains of the nation's most distinguished individuals, as well as reinterring prominent Lithuanian figures who had died earlier. Further work on the church was suspended during World War II. The Nazi occupational authorities used the church as a storeroom; during the Soviet occupation of Lithuania, the building was confiscated by the government. In 1952, Stalin decreed that it be used as a factory; the cross atop the tower was demolished, as was the chapel.

The church structure was used as a Banga radio factory until the Lithuanian national awakening in 1988. Soon thereafter, control of the church was returned to a newly founded council. In 1990, the Banga factory was ordered to vacate the building. After the factory went bankrupt, the eviction agreement was not enforced, and the removal of industrial equipment proceeded slowly. After 50 years of improper use and misuse, the church building was left in extremely poor condition. During the 1990s, its rehabilitation met with further obstacles; church and state had been officially separated, and Lithuanian citizens struggled with economic downturns during the transition to a market economy. There was a severe lack of funds for restoration work. Between 1993 and 1997, only the most urgently needed repairs were carried out, with the aim of protecting the building from further deterioration. Restoration work picked up in 1997 after financial support was received from the government. That year, Holy Mass was celebrated for the first time while the church was still covered by scaffolding. The church was consecrated in 2004. The columbarium was consecrated in 2006. The remains of the church's founder, Canon Feliksas Kapočius, are interred there. In 2004, the Chapel of the Blessed Virgin Mary of Šiluva was consecrated on the roof of the church in memory of those who died for the freedom of Lithuania. The relic of St. Anthony is embedded in the altar of the chapel.

On April 25, 2011, the high relief "Risen Christ" was consecrated, completing the renovation of the sacred space of the church. The author of the relief is sculptor Vytautas Kašuba. In 2015, the church received the minor basilica title from Pope Francis.

== Resurrection Basilica today ==
The basilica now features two towers: one is 70 meters high, and a lower one arises from the main altar. In the main tower's upper level there is an additional chapel. An elevator permits access to the basilica's roof, which affords a panoramic view of the city.

The basilica stands atop Kaunas's Green Hill, Žaliakalnis. Its cellarage houses a columbarium and a parish museum. The basilica is not solely dedicated to Roman Catholic ceremonies - it is also used for community gatherings and events, and as a preschool. The sanctuary seats 400; altogether, it can accommodate about 5,000 people.

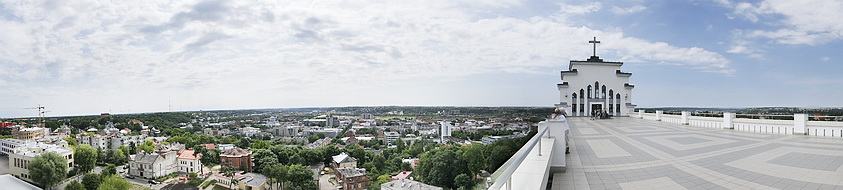
The City of Kaunas viewed from the rooftop of Christ's Resurrection Basilica
