= Kaunas Central Post Office =

- Kauno centrinis paštas

General information
- Type: Post office
- Architectural style: National style, Functionalism, Modern
- Location: Laisvės alėja 102, Kaunas, Lithuania
- Coordinates: 54°53′53″N 23°54′16″E
- Groundbreaking: 1930
- Completed: 1932
- Cost: ~1,750,000 litas

Technical details
- Material: Masonry (brick)

Design and construction
- Architect: Feliksas Vizbaras

UNESCO World Heritage Site
- Official name: Modernist Kaunas: Architecture of Optimism, 1919-1939
- Type: Cultural
- Criteria: iv
- Designated: 2023 (45th session)
- Reference no.
- UNESCO region: Europe

Kaunas Central Post Office (Lithuanian: Kauno centrinis paštas) is a former post office headquarters in Kaunas, Lithuania, which is one of the most notable buildings from the period when Kaunas was the temporary capital of Lithuania.

== Gallery ==
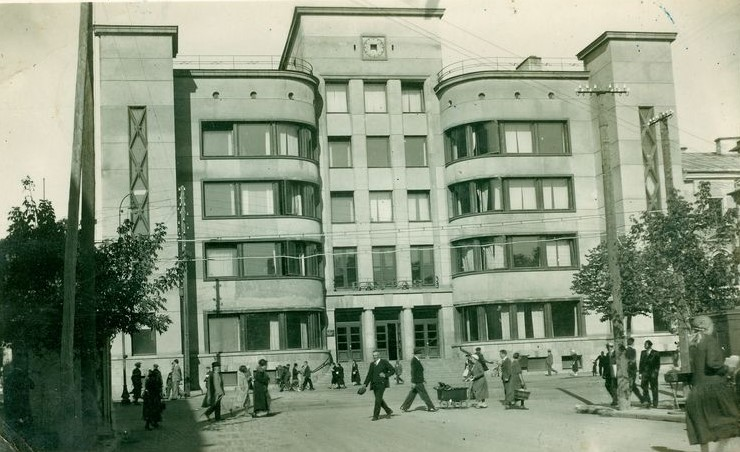
The building in 1930

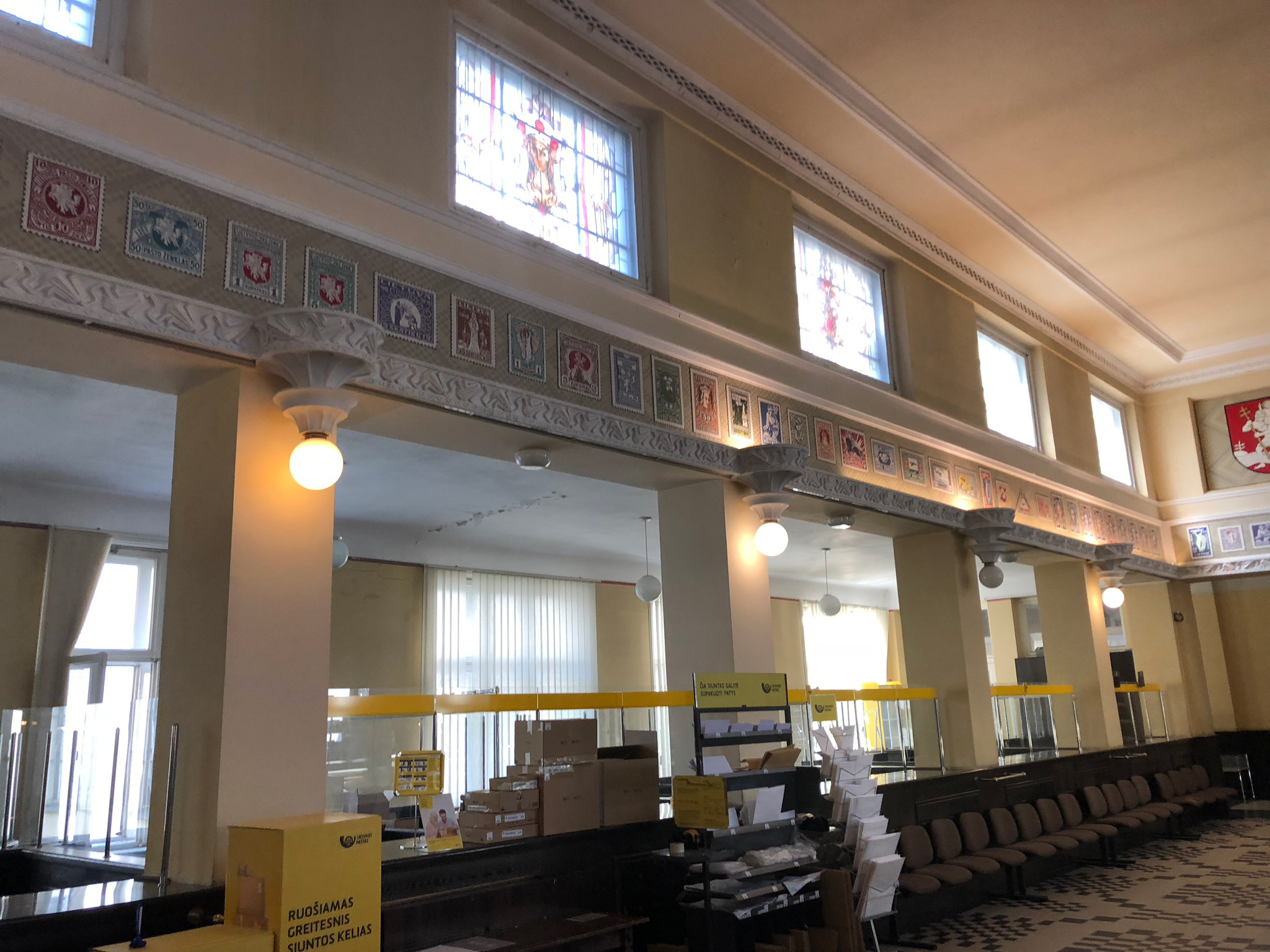
Interior

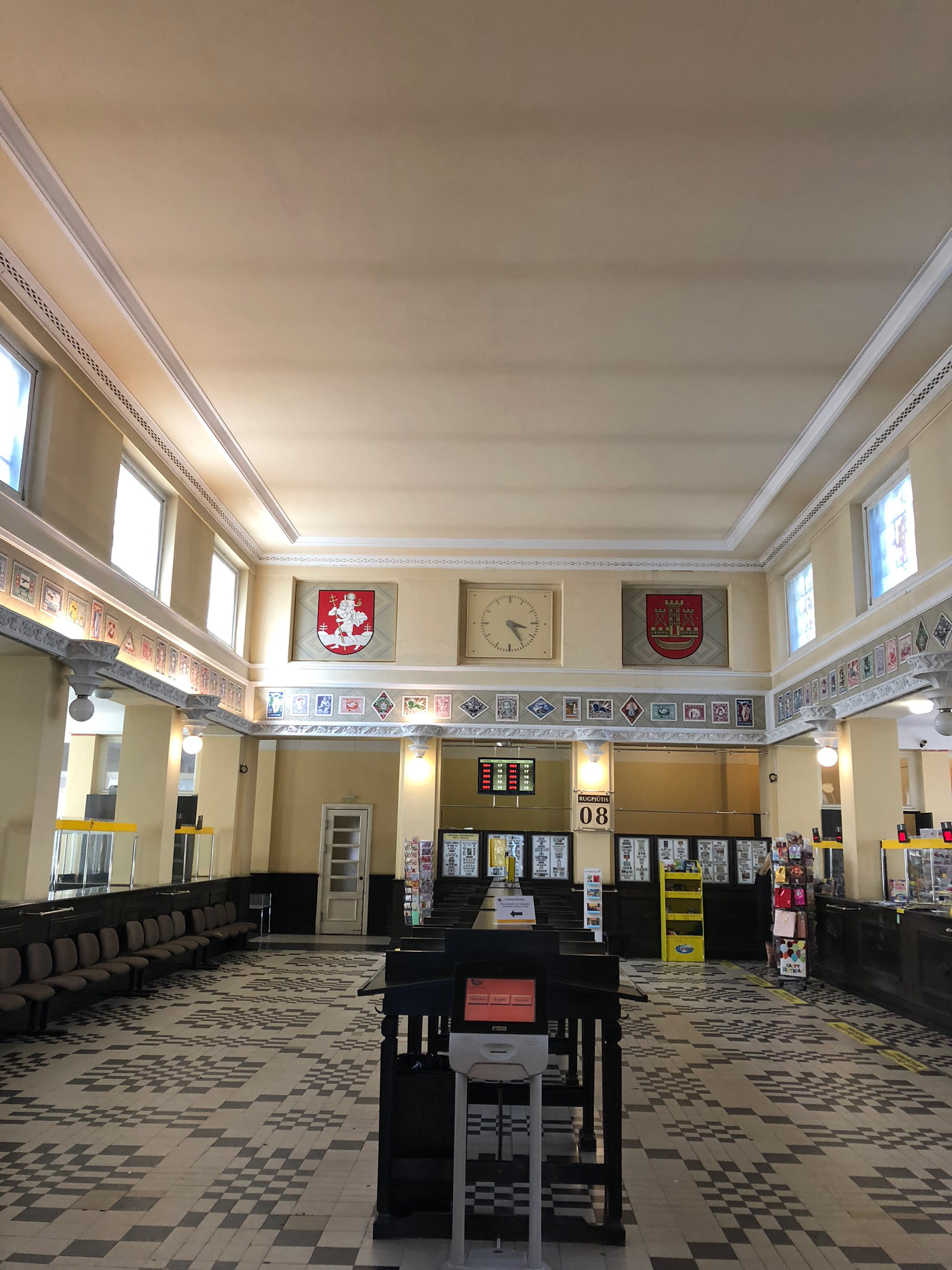
Interior

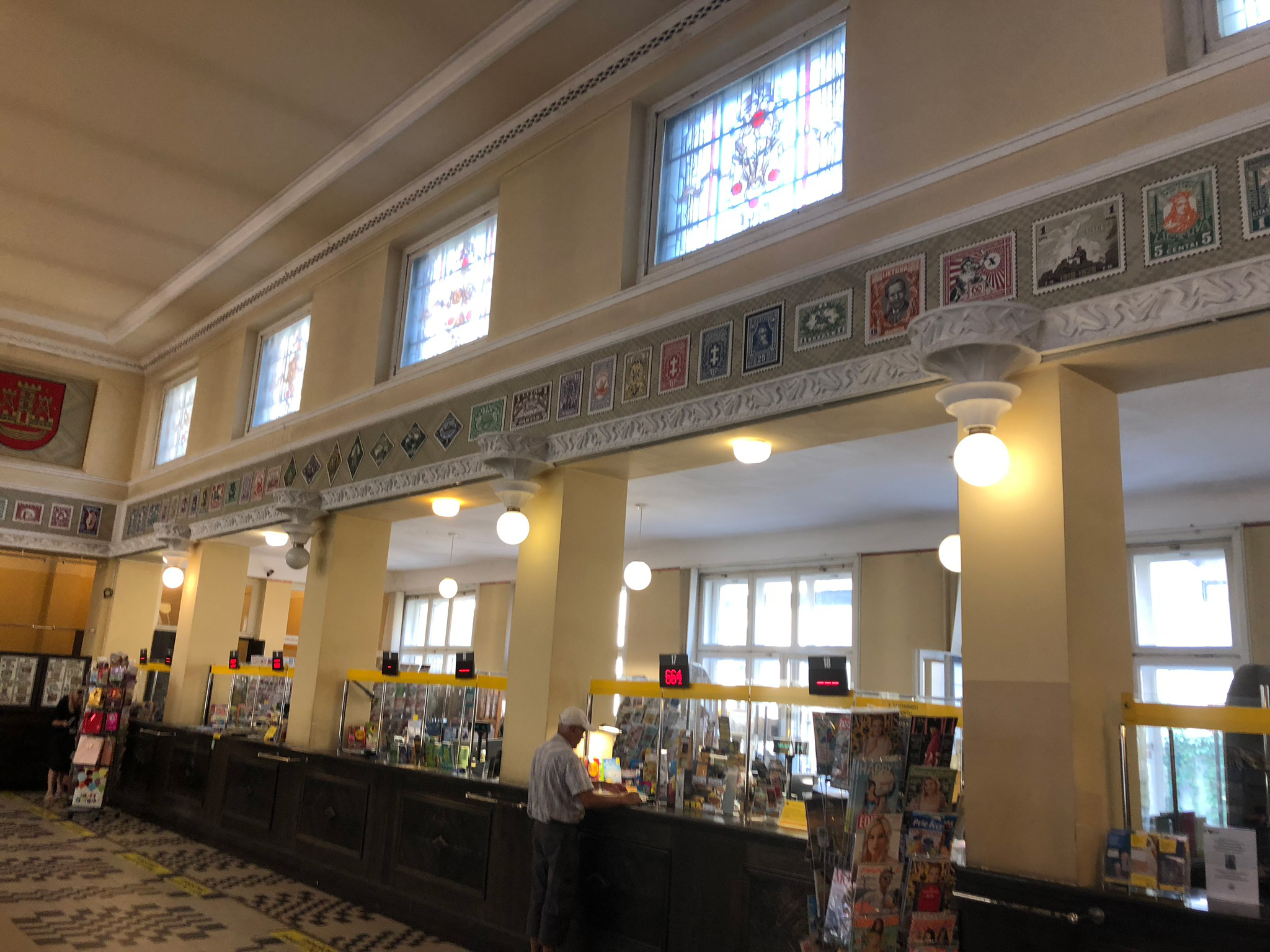
Interior

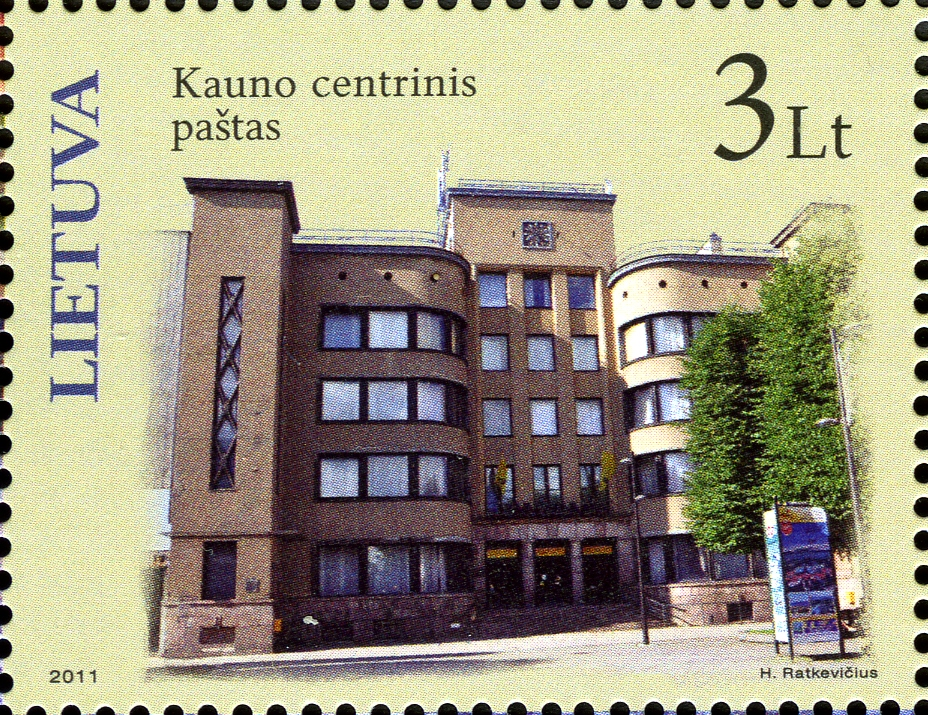
Lithuanian stamp (2011)
