= Physical Culture Palace =

Coordinates: 54°53′54″N 23°56′4″E

Physical Culture Palace building in 2014

Physical Culture Palace in 1938

Physical Culture Palace (Lithuanian: Kūno kultūros rūmai or Fiziško auklėjimo rūmai) was the first sports governing body in Lithuania. It acted from 1932 to 1940 in Ąžuolynas of Kaunas, Lithuania.

The building complex was designed by architect Vytautas Landsbergis-Žemkalnis. The initial project of the building complex included a very modern swimming pool, which would have been lit from below and with a retractable roof, however due to the financial consequences of the Great Depression the project was abandoned. In 1933, a simplified project of the building complex was prepared and built in 1933–1934.

The Physical Culture Palace was officially opened on 10 October 1934. The building had a spacious sports hall with 200 seats, designed and built for tennis. To increase grip for tennis players, the hall had expensive cork floor installed, which cost over 30,000 LTL (over $5,000) when average teacher salary at the time was around 350–500 LTL and 150–180 LTL for an ordinary worker. Being suitable for indoor basketball, the Hall hosted its first game on 16 November 1934, and soon became the main center for basketball in Lithuania events.

Currently the building serves as a Lithuanian Sports University central palace.
