= Pasaka Cinema =

Movie theater in Lithuania

- Pasakos kino teatras
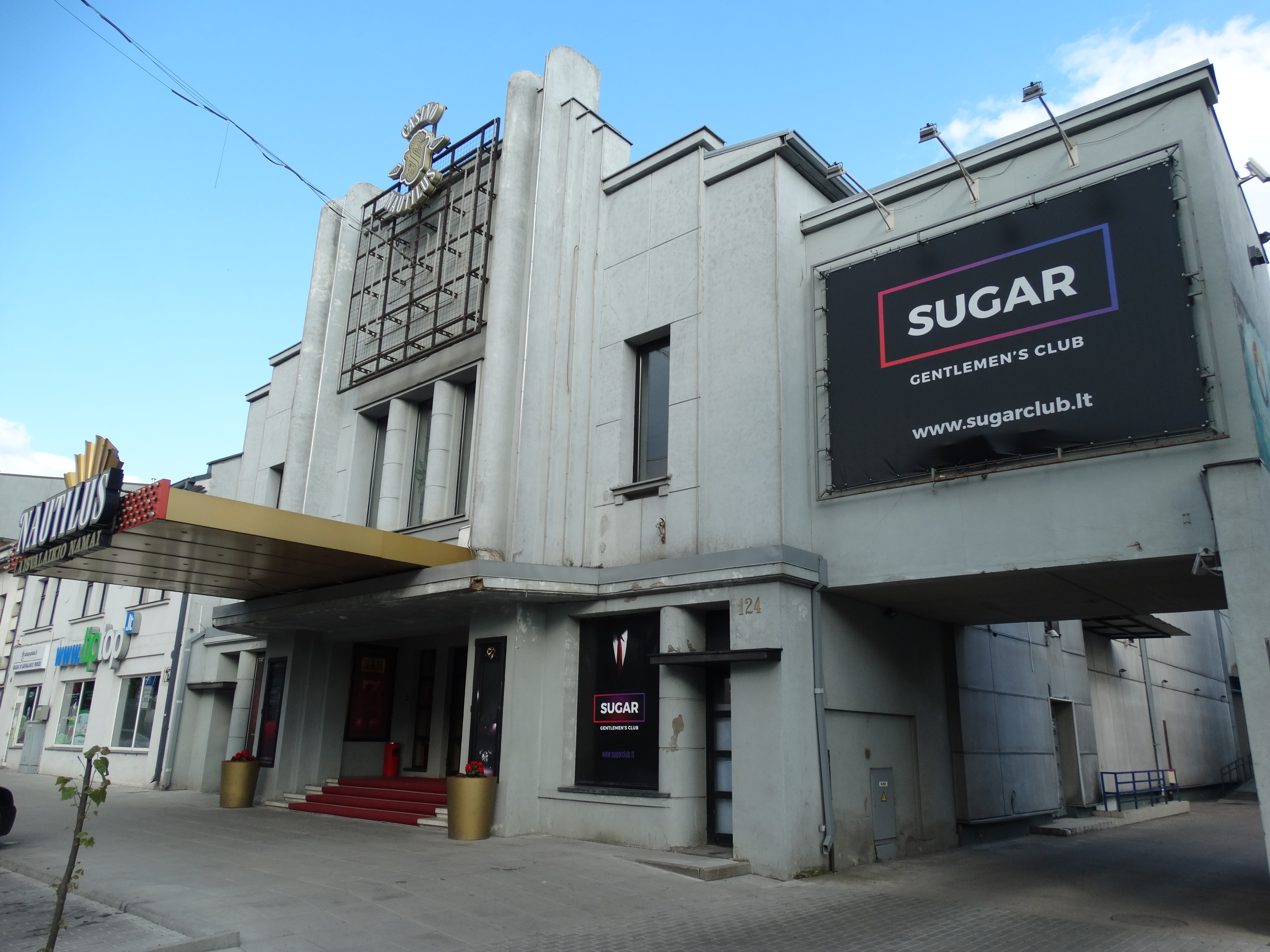

General information
- Status: Converted into an entertainment center
- Type: Former movie theater
- Architectural style: Art Deco
- Location: Savanorių av. 124, Kaunas, Lithuania
- Coordinates: 54.905906°N 23.92209°E
- Groundbreaking: 1938
- Completed: 1939
- Opened: 8 March 1940

Technical details
- Material: Masonry (brick)

Design and construction
- Architects: Jokūbas Rabinavičius, Juozas Segalauskas, M. Laurinavičiūtė

Pasaka Cinema (Lithuanian: Pasakos kino teatras) is an Art Deco style former cinema in Kaunas, Lithuania. At that time of the opening, the cinema was amongst the most modern in Kaunas.
