= Kaunas State Philharmonic =

- Kauno valstybinė filharmonija

General information
- Status: Currently used as philharmonic
- Type: Philharmonic
- Architectural style: National style, Art Deco, Neoclassicism
- Location: Kaunas, Lithuania, E. Ožeškienės st. 12/L. Sapiegos st. 5
- Coordinates: 54°53′56″N 23°54′20″E
- Groundbreaking: 1925
- Inaugurated: 1928
- Renovated: 2008
- Cost: 2.2 million LTL

Technical details
- Material: Masonry (brick), Ferroconcrete

Design and construction
- Architect: Edmundas Alfonsas Frykas

Website
- www.kaunofilharmonija.lt

UNESCO World Heritage Site
- Official name: Modernist Kaunas: Architecture of Optimism, 1919-1939
- Type: Cultural
- Criteria: iv
- Designated: 2023 (45th session)
- Reference no.
- UNESCO region: Europe

Kaunas State Philharmonic (Lithuanian: Kauno valstybinė filharmonija) is located in the former Palace of Justice and the Parliament (Lithuanian: Lietuvos Teisingumo ir Seimo rūmai). The building was designed by the engineer and architect Edmund Fryk.

== History ==
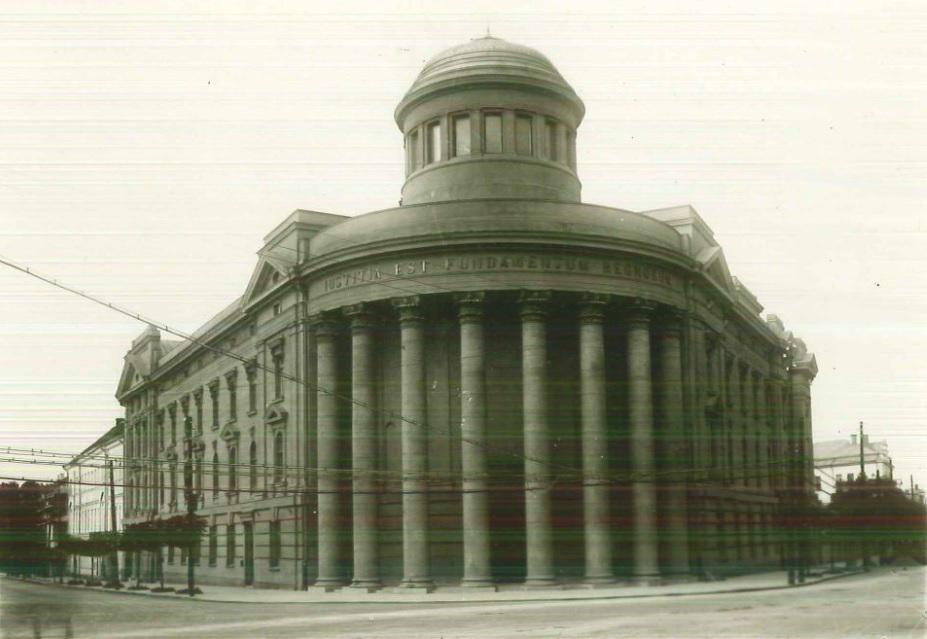
Palace during the interwar period

The construction of the Palace of Justice and the Parliament began in 1925, in the former temporary capital, in the junction of L. Sapiegos and E. Ožeškienės streets. The construction was completed in 1928. Above the main entrance there was a text in Latin "JUSTITIA EST FUNDAMENTUM REGNORUM" (English: Justice is the foundation of states). The process of the trial of Neumann and Sass was held in the Palace of Justice and the Parliament in 1934–1935.

In 1961, the part of the building and the Great Hall was conveyed to the Department of Kaunas, of LSSR National Philharmonic Society. From 1944 to 1961, the Department of Kaunas did not have the constant hall, the concerts took place in the regions of the country, at various halls of the city, at Kaunas Sports Hall; the concerts in Kaunas were planned by the Lithuanian National Philharmonic Society.

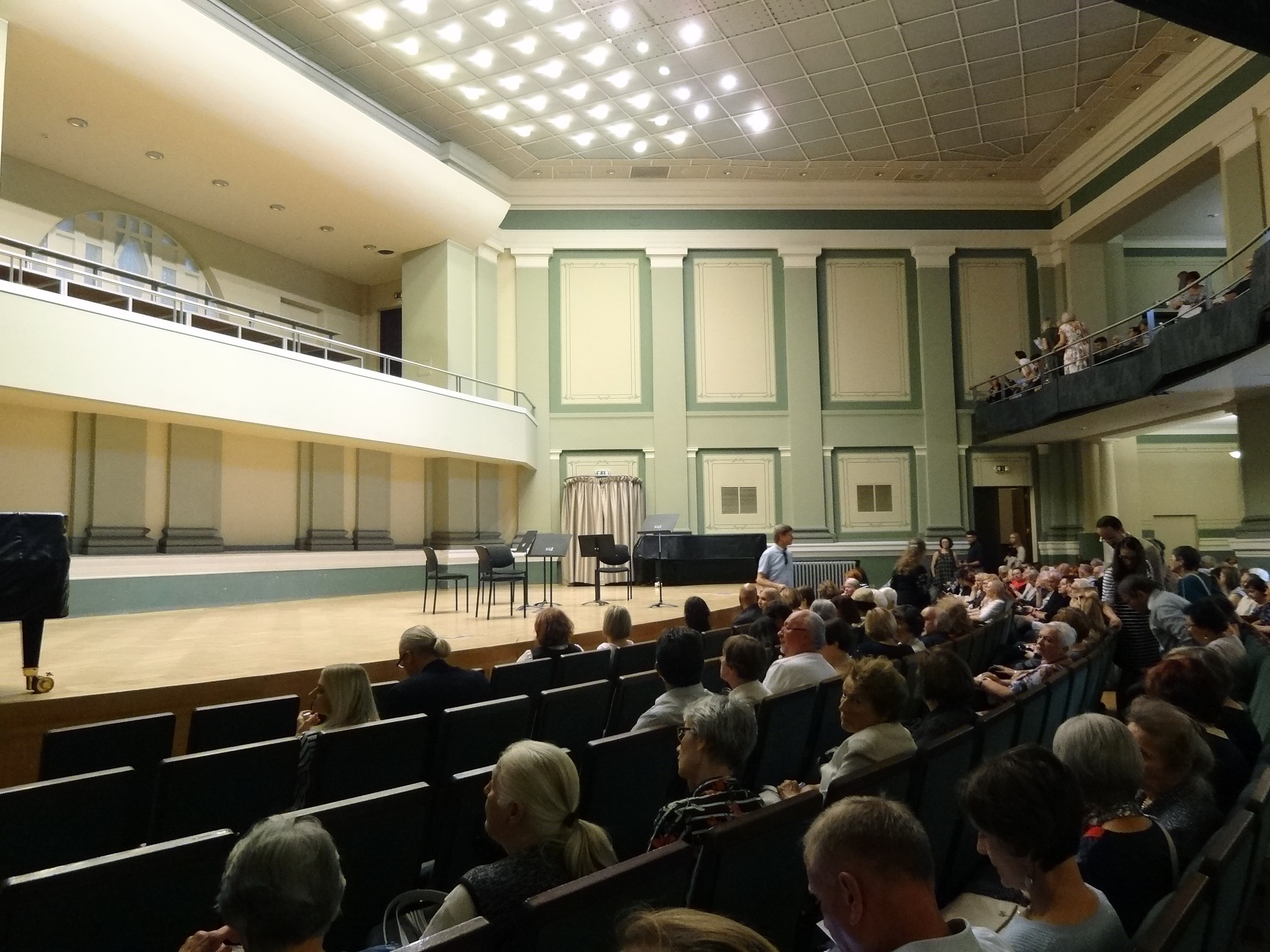
The renovated interior of the Philharmonic in a concert intermission, 2019; fot. Ivonna Nowicka

In 2006, under the decision of the Ministry of Culture of the Republic of Lithuania, the department of Lithuanian National Philharmonic Society has become the independent concert institution – Kaunas State Philharmonic Society. In the summer of 2005, the reconstruction began, and in 2008, on the 1st of October, the audience was invited to the renovated Kaunas State Philharmonic building.
