= Multitel =

Finance company used for Ponzi scheme

- Industry: Finance
- Founders: Saturnino Baladjay; Rosario Baladjay
- Fate: Ceased operations

Multinational Telecom Investors Corporation, commonly known as Multitel, was a finance company used as a platform for a Ponzi scheme by couple Saturnino and Rosario "Rose" Baladjay.

== History ==
Multitel in 1998 began enticing clients to invest in Benefon, a Finland-based telecommunications firm.

In 2001, allegations that Multitel is engaging in scams arose. The Senate held hearings regarding the case. Rose Baladjay would be arrested in March 2003 in Mangaldan, Pangasinan for failing to comply with the Senate's order for her to take part in the hearings. 800 investors along with the Department of Justice, filed cases against syndicated estafa against Multitel, along with Everflow Group of Companies.

In 2013, Rose would be convicted for committing fraud. In 2015, the Baladjays were convicted for Multitel's selling unregistered securities to the public.
