= Centras Eldership =

Centras
- Eldership
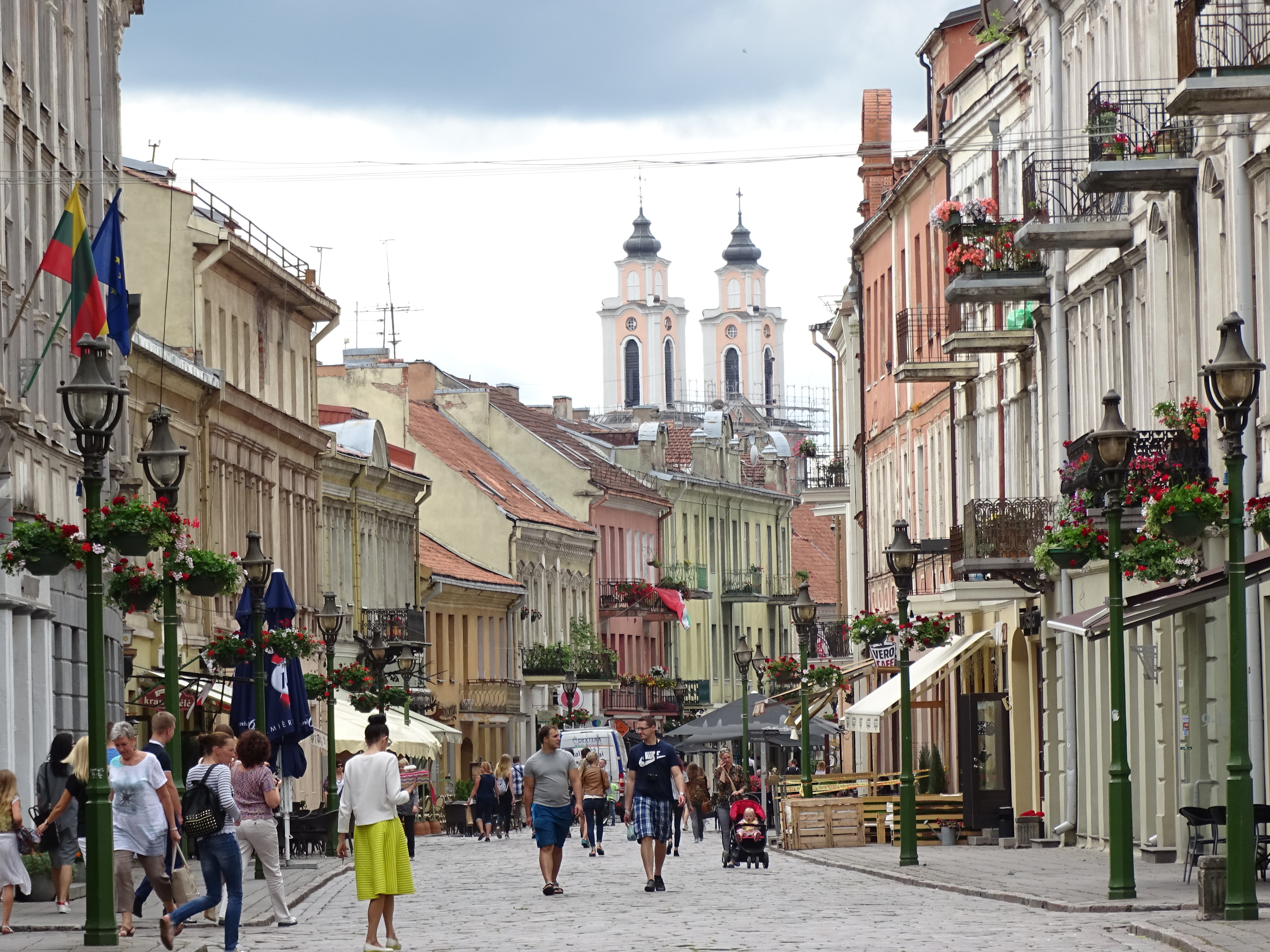
- Vilniaus Street in the Kaunas Old Town

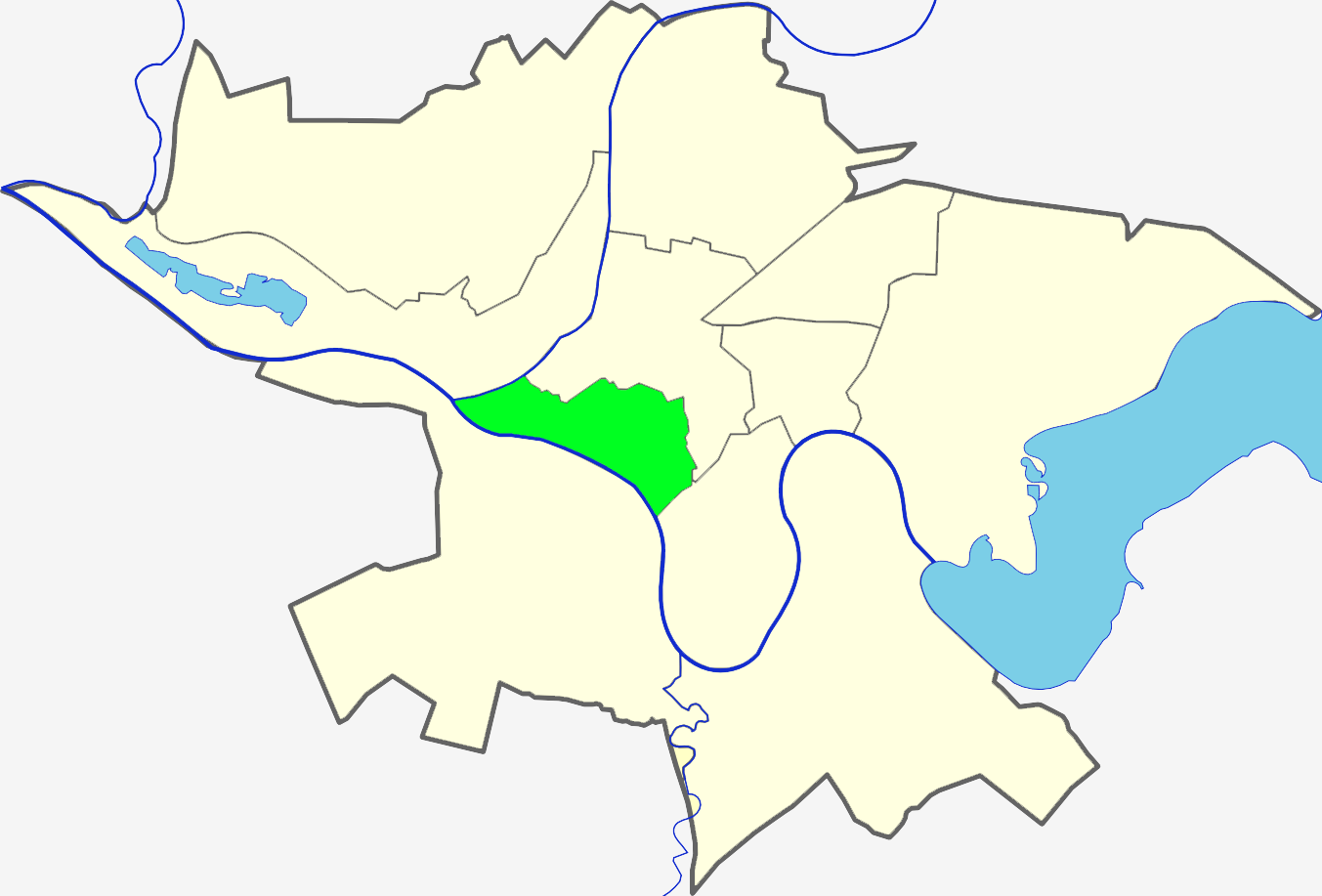
- Location of Centras Eldership within Kaunas
- Coordinates: 54°53′34″N 23°54′9″E
- Country: Lithuania
- County: Kaunas County
- Municipality: Kaunas city municipality

Area
  - Total: 4.58 km^{2} (1.77 sq mi)

Population
  - Total: 14,723
  - Density: 3,210/km^{2} (8,330/sq mi)
- Time zone: UTC+2 (EET)
  - Summer (DST): UTC+3 (EEST)

The Centras Eldership (Lithuanian: Centro seniūnija) is an Eldership in the city of Kaunas, Lithuania, based on two neighbourhoods of Kaunas - the Old City and the New City. It lies at the confluence of two major Lithuanian rivers, the Nemunas and the Neris. The borough borders Žaliakalnis in the north, Šančiai in the east, Aleksotas in the south and Vilijampolė in the west.

== Kaunas Old Town ==
Kaunas Old Town - the oldest part of Kaunas town, located to the east of the confluence of the Nemunas and Neris rivers, occupies 144 hectares. There are a lot of surviving Gothic, Renaissance and Baroque buildings, especially in the western part of the Old Town. Many notable buildings and facilities are located in the Old Town, such as the Kaunas Town Hall, the Kaunas Castle and the Historical Presidential Palace, House of Perkūnas, also the Kaunas Cathedral, the Church of St. Gertrude, Vytautas' church and many other churches. A great variety of museums, such as Museum of the History of Lithuanian Medicine and Pharmacy, Povilas Stulga Museum of Lithuanian Folk Instruments, Maironis Lithuanian literature Museum, Communication History Museum, Museum of Gemology and Kaunas City Museum are situated. The largest seminary in Lithuania - Kaunas Priest Seminary is located in the westernmost part of the Old Town. The seat of Roman Catholic Archdiocese of Kaunas is based nearby. The main Kaunas street in the Old Town, and its continuation in the New Town - the pedestrian Laisvės Alėja runs across the Eldership. Laisvės Alėja is the longest pedestrian street in the whole Europe – 1.7 km. Laisvės Alėja connects Vilnius Street and Kaunas Cathedral. There was a horse-drawn tram in Laisvės avenue until 1929 which was called this way because a tram on a railing (Lith. konkė) was drawn by horses. Banks, various offices, restaurants, cafes, and many modern shops are situated on this street. It is a favorite place for walks and meetings of Kaunas citizens.

== Kaunas New Town ==
Kaunas' New Town (Naujamiestis) - the district, located east of Old Town, began to develop in 1847, tzar-time type of the new rectangular structure of the city. The New Town of Kaunas occupies 314 hectares. The New Town is especially known for Interbellum functionalism architecture complexes when Kaunas became the Temporary capital of Lithuania. In the New Town Kaunas City Municipality, numerous business centers, hotels, and some shopping centers are situated. There are also the Kaunas Synagogue, the St. Michael the Archangel Church and the only mosque in Lithuania, the Kaunas Mosque located in the New Town. Kaunas Red Cross Hospital is located in the centre. On the bank of Nemunas River, on an island, the largest indoor arena in the Baltic states was opened in 2011, the Žalgiris Arena. The arena was acknowledged as the most visited the Euroleague arena two years in a row.

The Lithuanian University of Health Sciences, the Vytautas Magnus University and the Kaunas University of Technology are located there, as well as numerous museums: the Tadas Ivanauskas Zoological Museum, the Žmuidzinavičius Museum, the Vytautas the Great War Museum and Kaunas Museum for the Blind. M. K. Čiurlionis National Art Museum based in central Kaunas, is primarily dedicated to exhibiting the works of Lithuanian painter and musician M.K. Čiurlionis. Central Kaunas is connected with the neighbourhood of Žaliakalnis by the Žaliakalnis Funicular Railway constructed in the 1930s.

The headquarters and some other administrative buildings of the Kaunas Fortress' commandant are still used for public needs. Central Kaunas is also well known for its public statuary.

The main cultural institutions of the city are also located there, such as Kaunas State Musical Theatre, Kaunas State Drama Theatre, Kaunas Chamber Theatre and Kaunas Symphony Orchestra.

The M. K. Čiurlionis Bridge and Vytautas the Great Bridge link the district to Aleksotas and Petras Vileišis Bridge links it to Vilijampolė. The New Town of Kaunas is well connected with Kaunas International Airport by developed public transportation. At the eastern edge of central Kaunas, central railway station and Kaunas Railway Tunnel are situated.

== Gallery ==
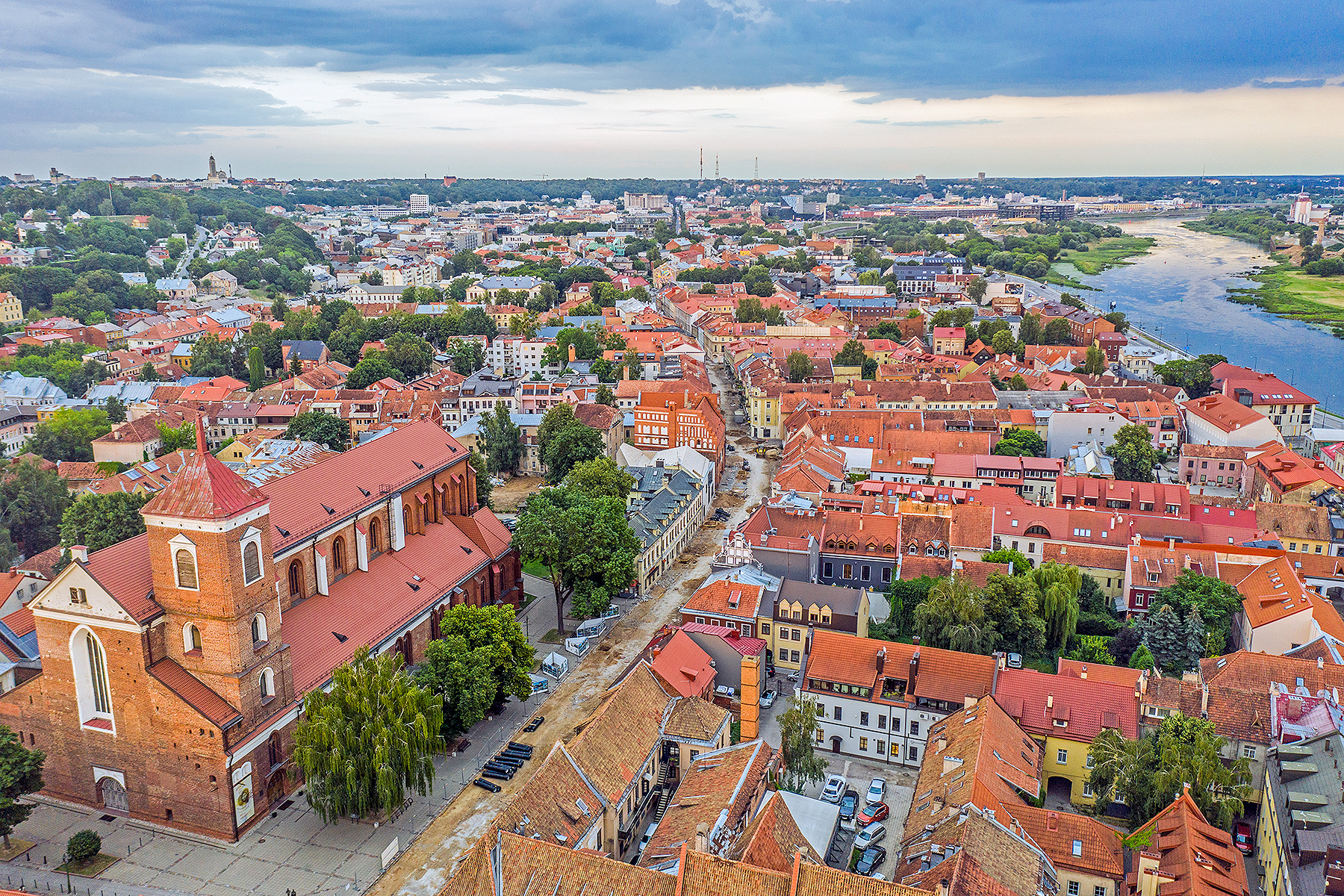
Centre of Kaunas

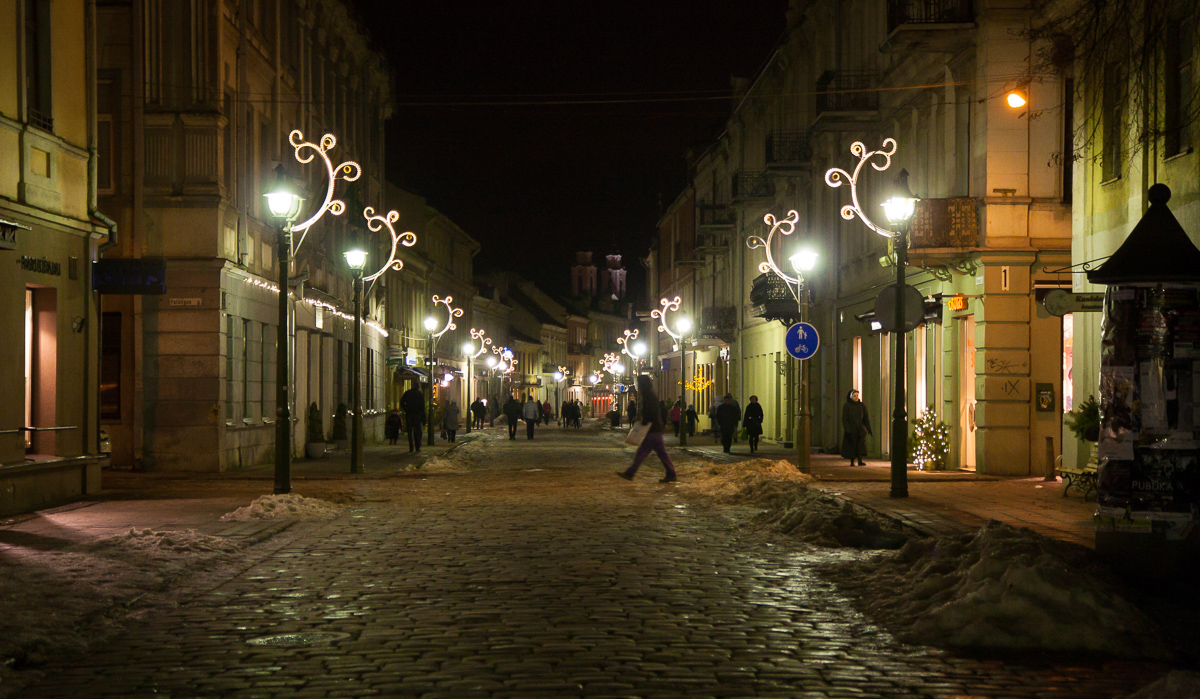
Kaunas Old Town in winter

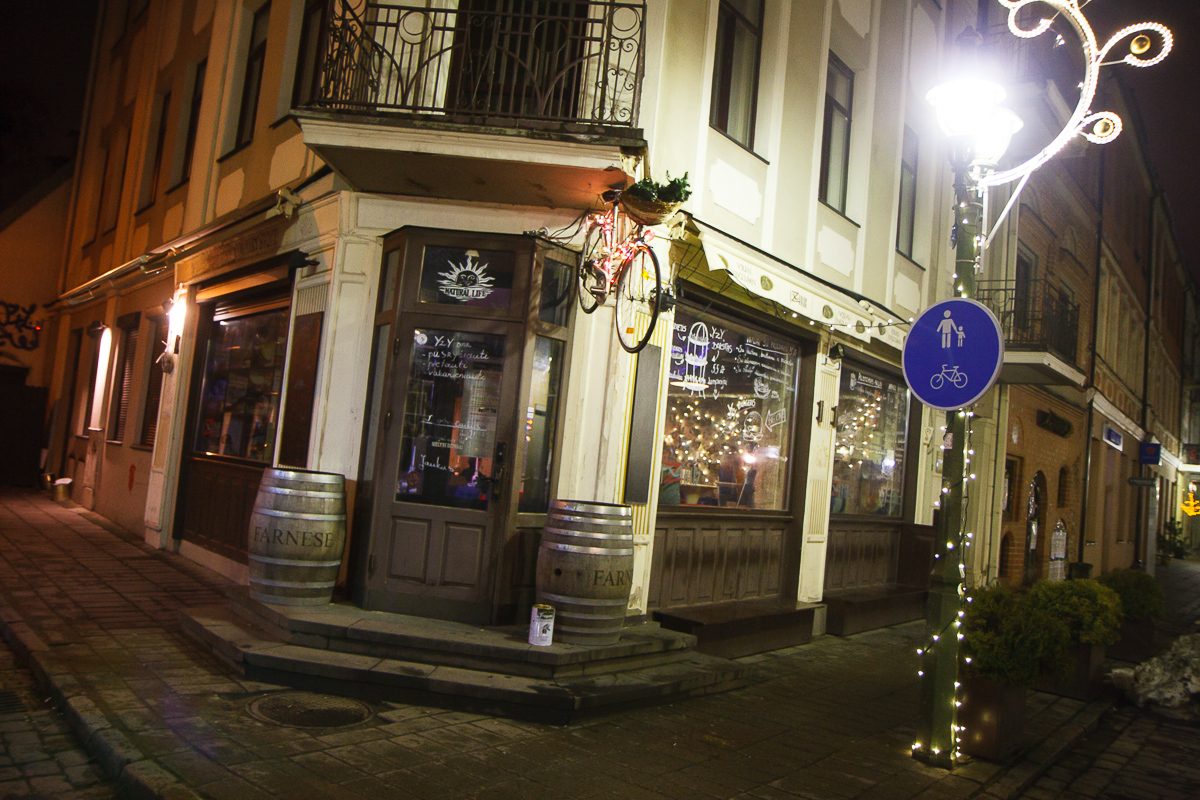
One of the Kaunas Old Town restaurants

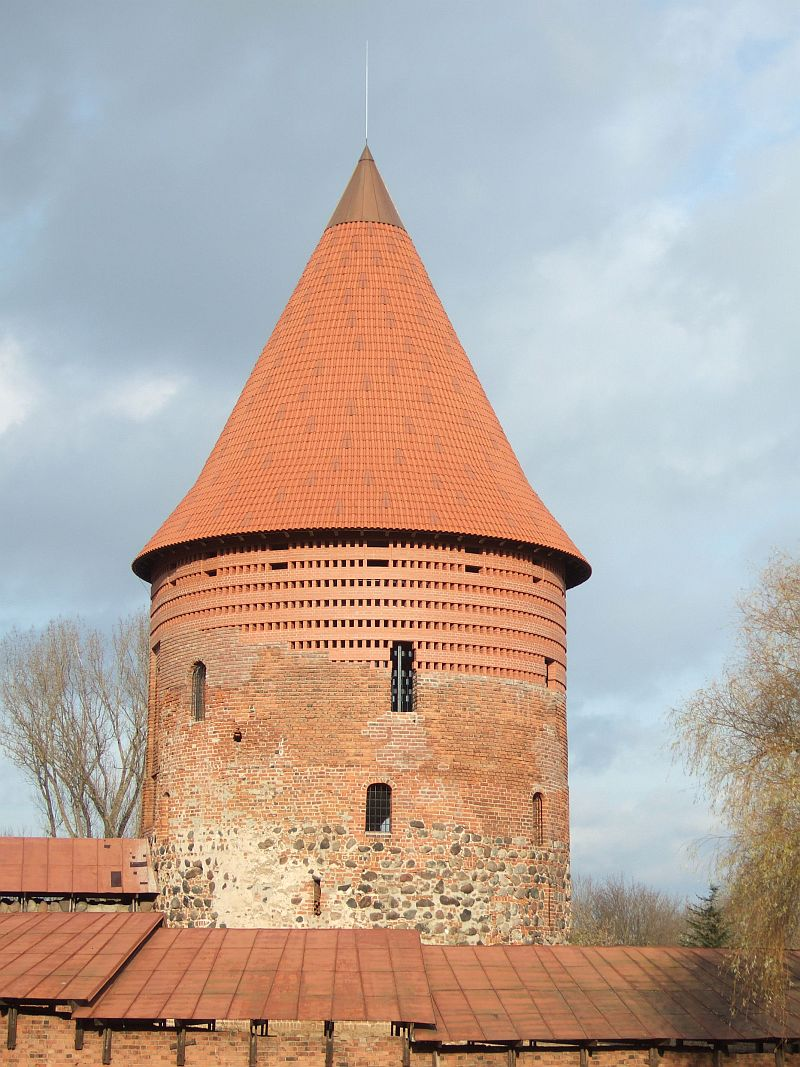
The Tower of Kaunas Castle

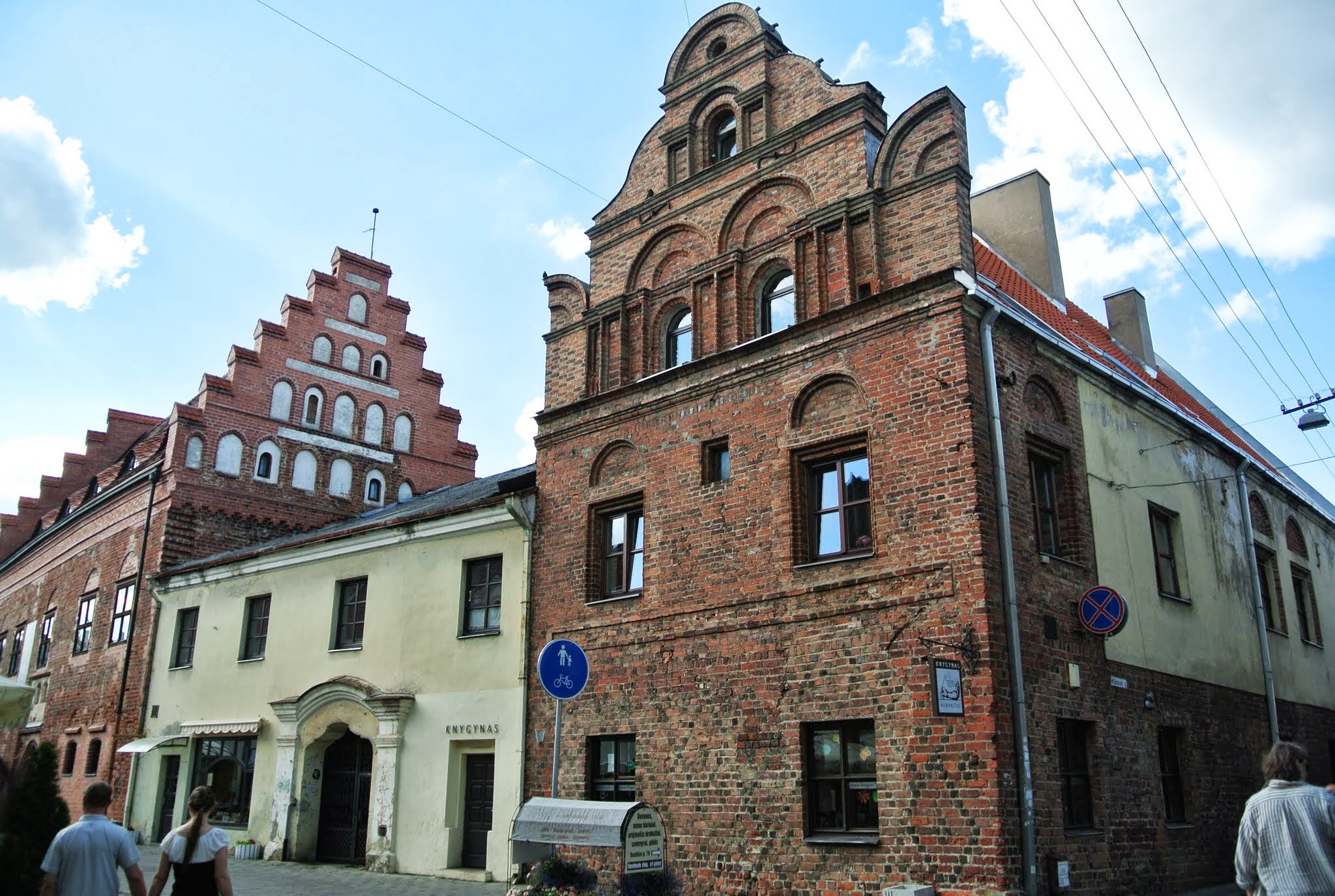
Gothic architecture in the Old Town

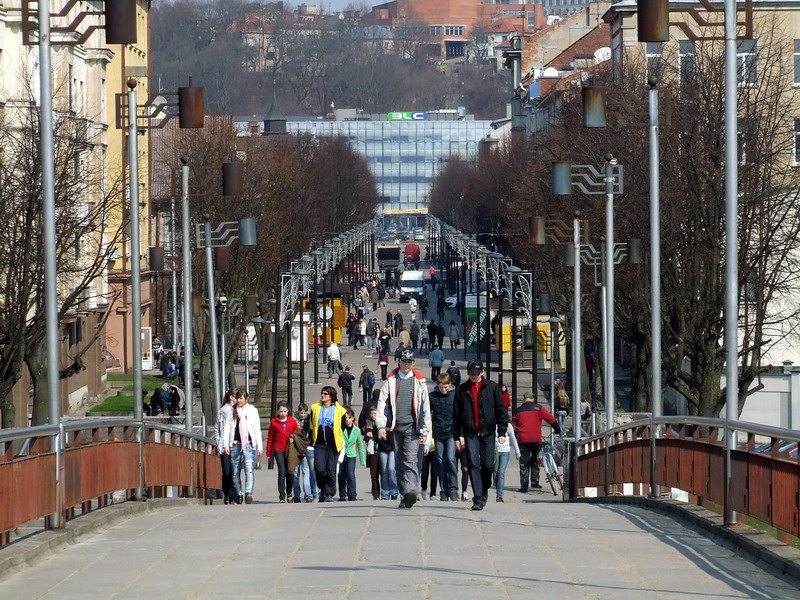
S. Daukanto gatvė in Kaunas

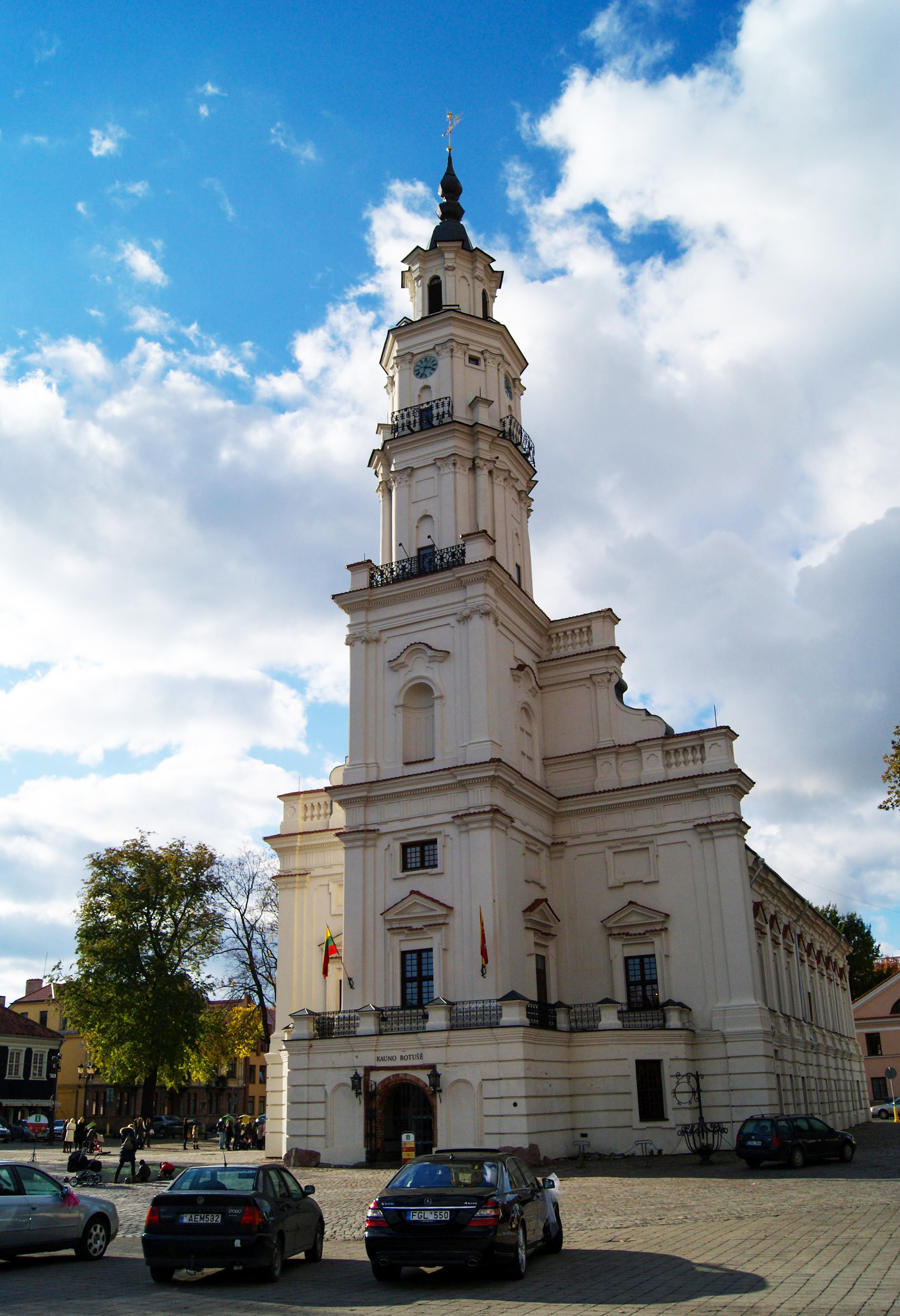
Kaunas Town Hall

Vienybės Square in the New Town

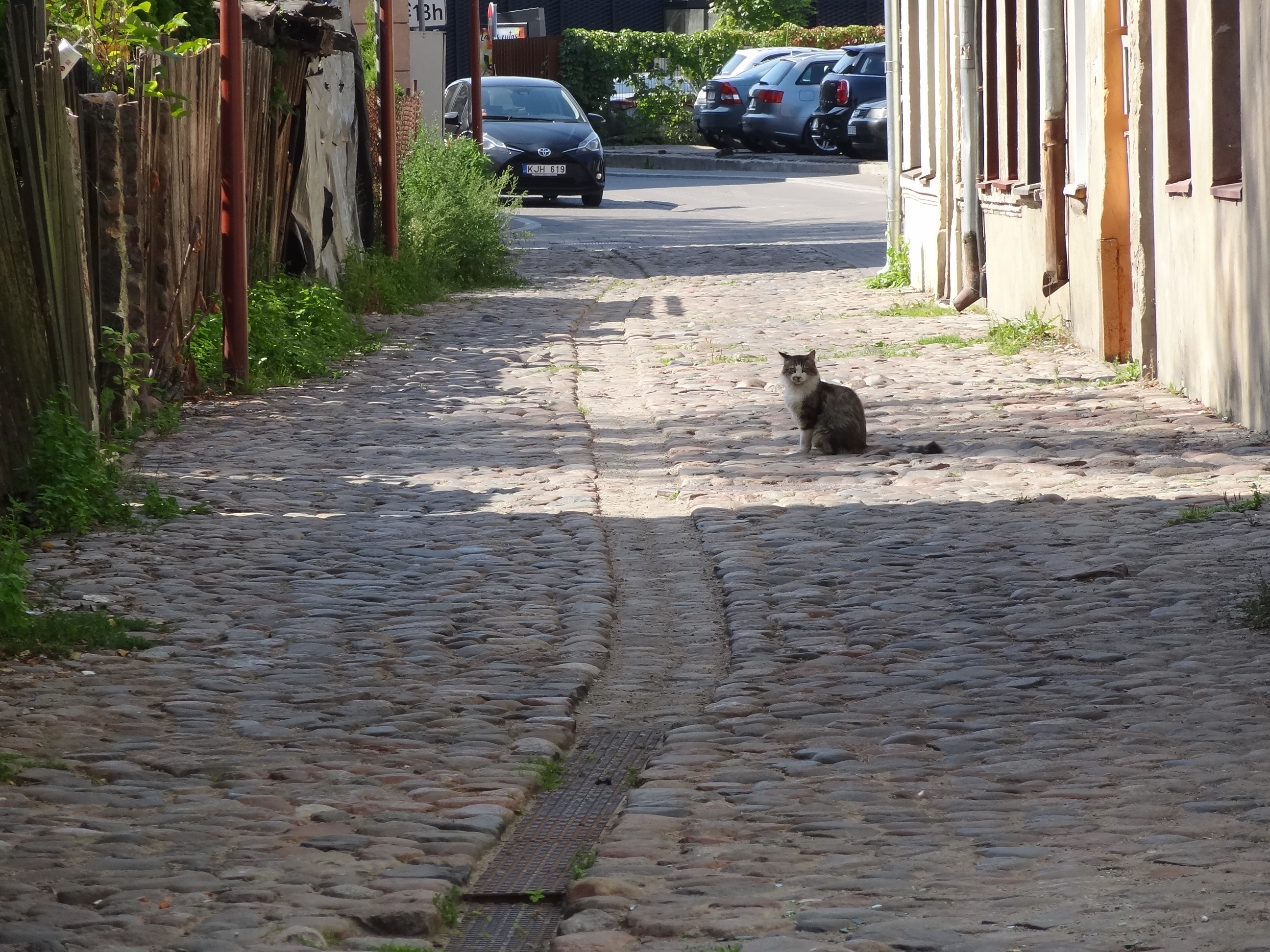
A cobblestone lane with a leisurely cat

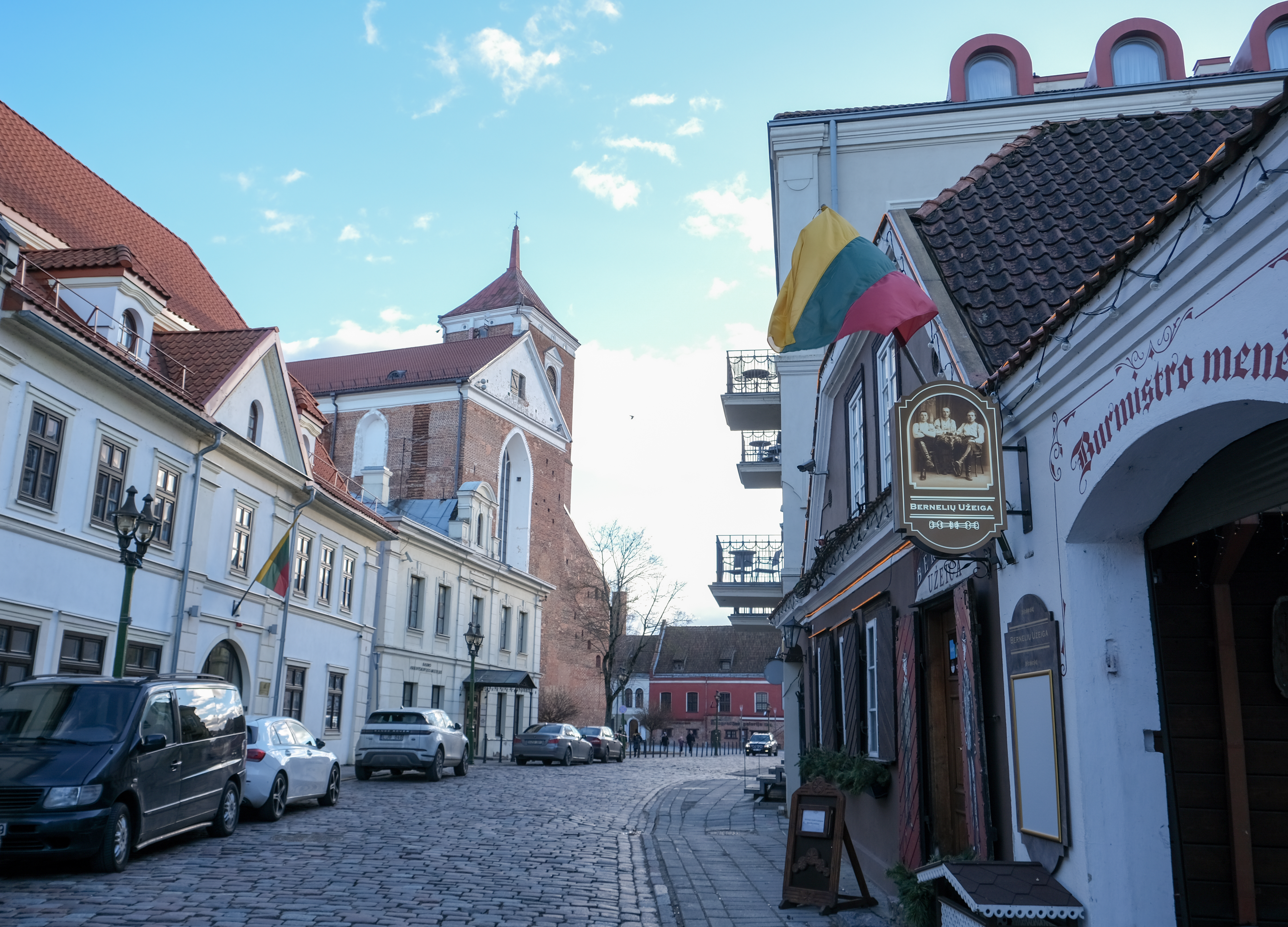
Motiejaus Valančiaus Street near Kaunas Cathedral
