= Vilijampolė =

- Eldership
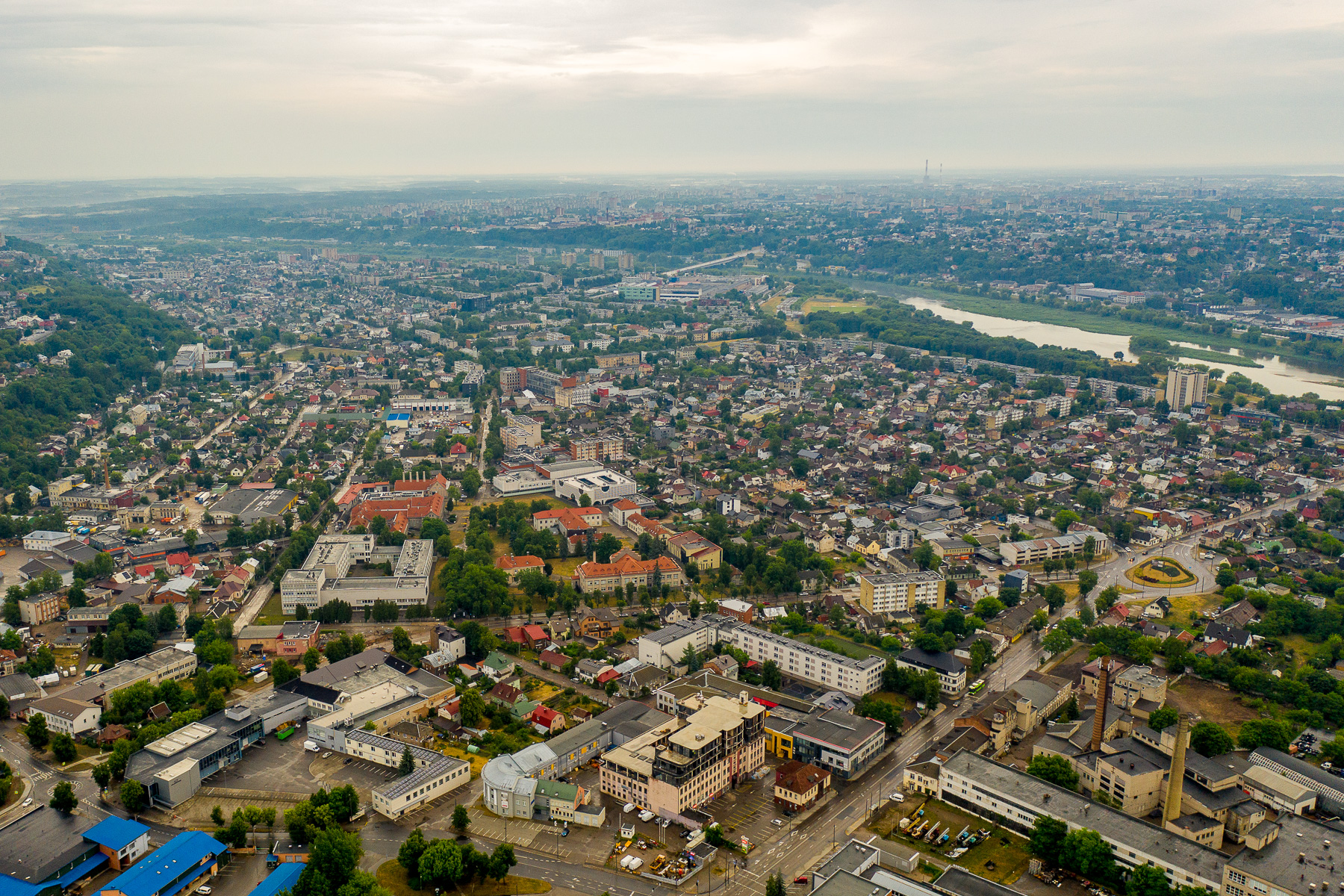
- Bird's-eye view of Vilijampolė

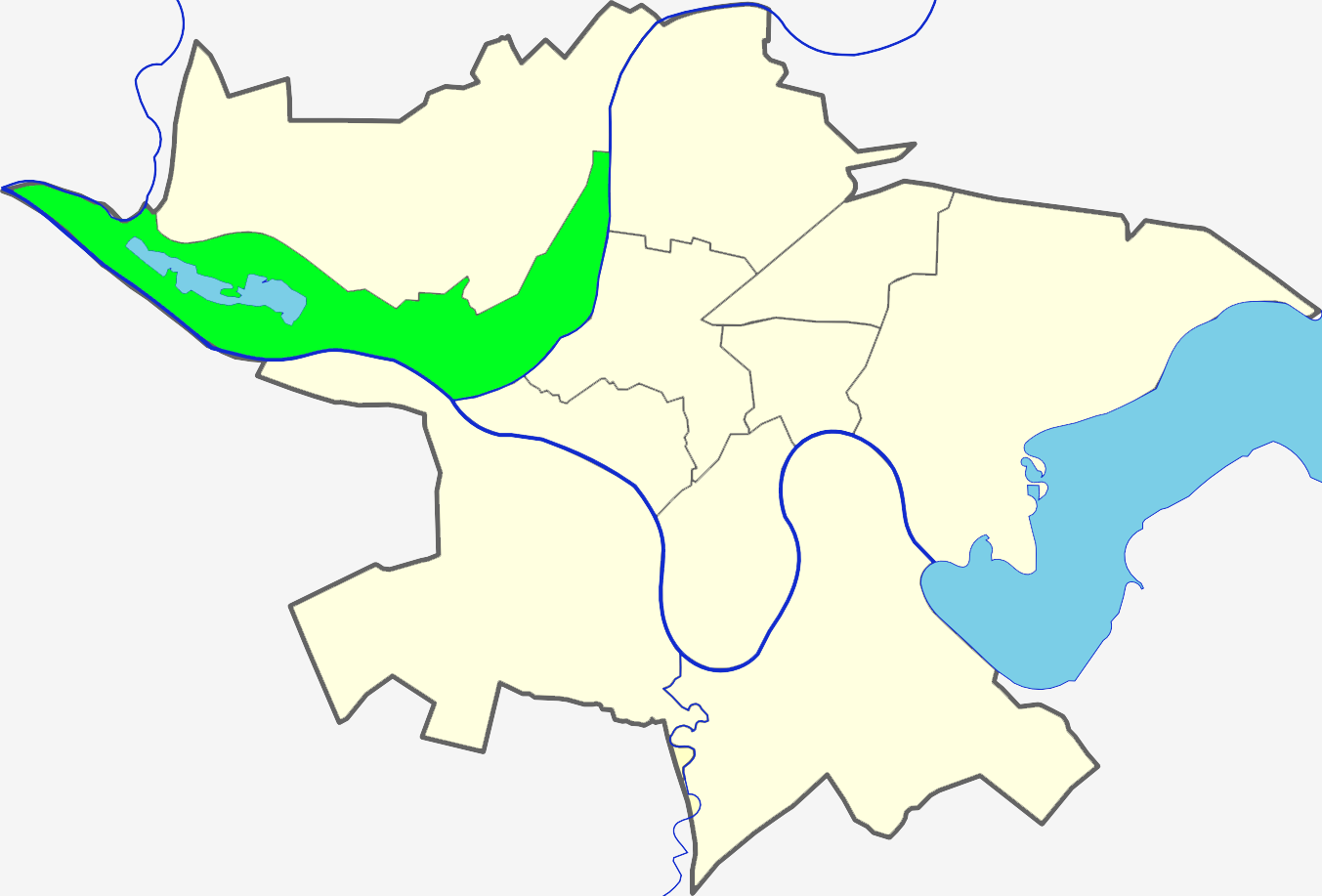
- Location of Vilijampolė within Kaunas
- Coordinates: 54°55′N 23°53′E
- Country: Lithuania
- County: Kaunas County
- Municipality: Kaunas city municipality

Area
  - Total: 14.38 km^{2} (5.55 sq mi)

Population (2021)
  - Total: 23,687
  - Density: 1,647/km^{2} (4,266/sq mi)
- Time zone: UTC+2 (EET)
  - Summer (DST): UTC+3 (EEST)

Vilijampolė is a neighborhood in the city of Kaunas, Lithuania, located on the right bank of the Neris River and the Nemunas River, near their confluence. Part of a larger Vilijampolė elderate which consists of Vilijampolė, Lampėdžiai, Panerys, and Veršvai neighorhoods, and covers 1438 hectares with population of 23,687 people.

In the past, it was a separate town from Kaunas. The Jews are known to have settled here since the fourteenth century. Due to this the place was referred to as Judenstadt, 'Jewtown'. The popular nickname Slabotkė is still in use, derived from the Polish name of the place, Słobódka Wiliampolska. The word Wiliampolska is an adjective from "Wiliampol" ("Wilia town"), derived from the Slavic name of the nearby Neris river - Wilia; and "słobódka" means "little sloboda", i.e. 'little free settlement'. Later this name was Lithuanised into "Vilijampolė". Historically, it was the home of the Slabodka yeshiva, or Yeshivas Knesses Yisrael, and the main site of the Nazi-imposed Kaunas Ghetto, from 1943 the Kaunas concentration camp (KZ Kauen).

The Lithuanian Veterinary Academy campus is located in the neighbourhood. Two bridges across the Neris connect Vilijampolė with the main part of the city. Petras Vileišis Bridge connects the district with the Old Town and Varniai Bridge with the neighbourhood of Žaliakalnis.
