= Joseph von Mering =

German physician

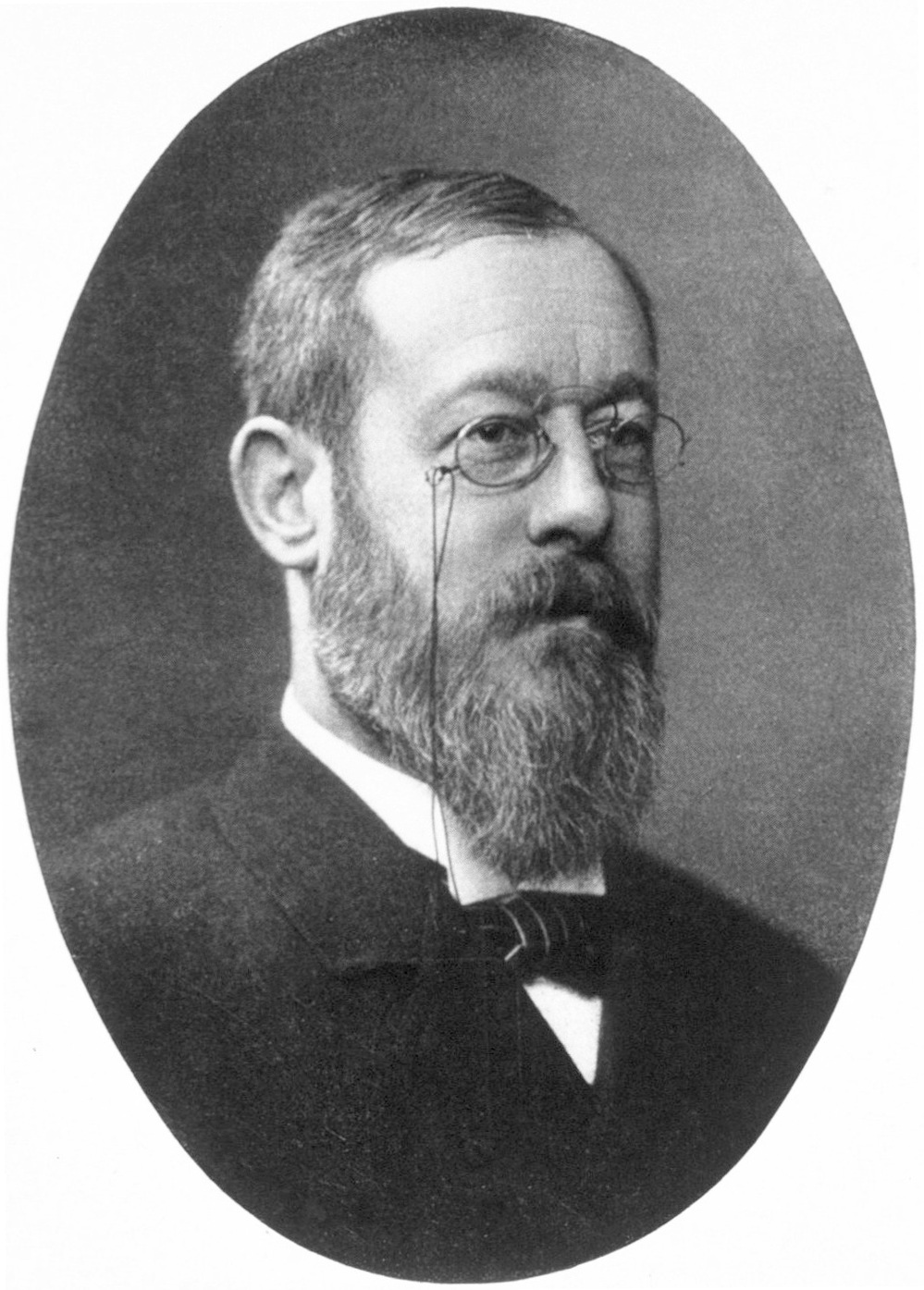
Josef von Mering

Josef, Baron von Mering (28 February 1849, in Cologne – 5 January 1908, at Halle an der Saale, Germany) was a German physician.

Working at the University of Strasbourg, Mering was the first person to discover (in conjunction with Oskar Minkowski) that one of the pancreatic functions is the production of insulin, a hormone which controls blood sugar levels.

In an effort to discover the function of the pancreas, he removed the organ from a dog. The dog was then noticed frequently urinating on the floor, although it was house trained. Mering realised that this was a symptom of diabetes and tested the urine, which was found to be high in sugar, confirming his suspicion.

Josef von Mering helped to discover barbiturates, a class of sedative drugs used for insomnia, epilepsy, anxiety, and anesthesia. In 1903, he published observations that barbital (then known as diethyl-barbituric acid) has sedative properties in humans. In 1904, he helped to launch barbital under the brand name Veronal. Veronal was the first commercially available barbiturate sedative in any country. Von Mering collaborated with the chemist Emil Fischer, who was also involved in the discovery of barbital.
