= Varniai Bridge =

Bridge in Kaunas, Lithuania

Coordinates: 54°54′52″N 23°54′34″E

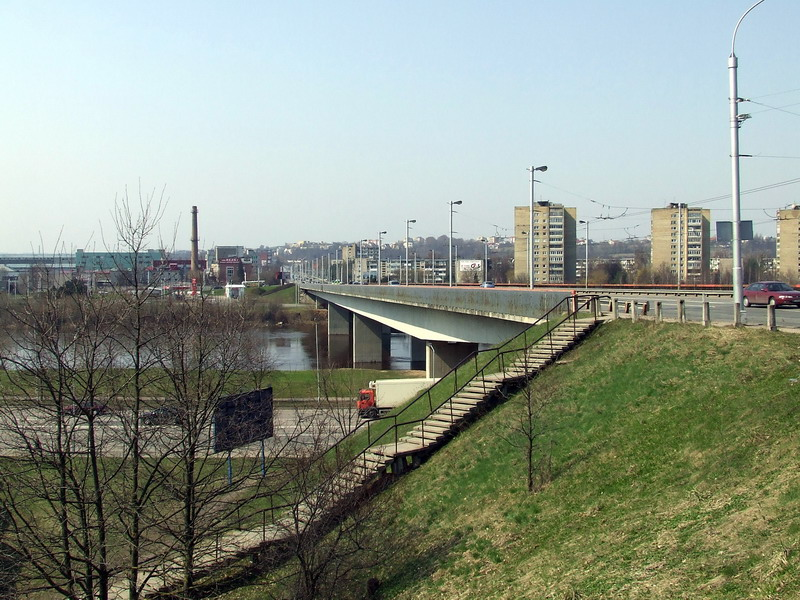
Varnių Bridge facing Vilijampolė

Varnių Bridge (Lithuanian: Varnių tiltas) is a bridge across the Neris River, that connects Vilijampolė and Žaliakalnis districts of Kaunas, Lithuania. It was built in 1983. The bridge is 328 meters long and approximately 25 meters wide. It carries six lanes of automobile traffic, with three lanes in each direction. Before World War II, neighbourhoods of Vilijampolė and Žaliakalnis were connected by temporary Eiguliai bridge.
