= Povilas Stulga Museum of Lithuanian Folk Instruments =

Museum in Kaunas, Lithuania

Coordinates: 54°53′44″N 23°53′34″E

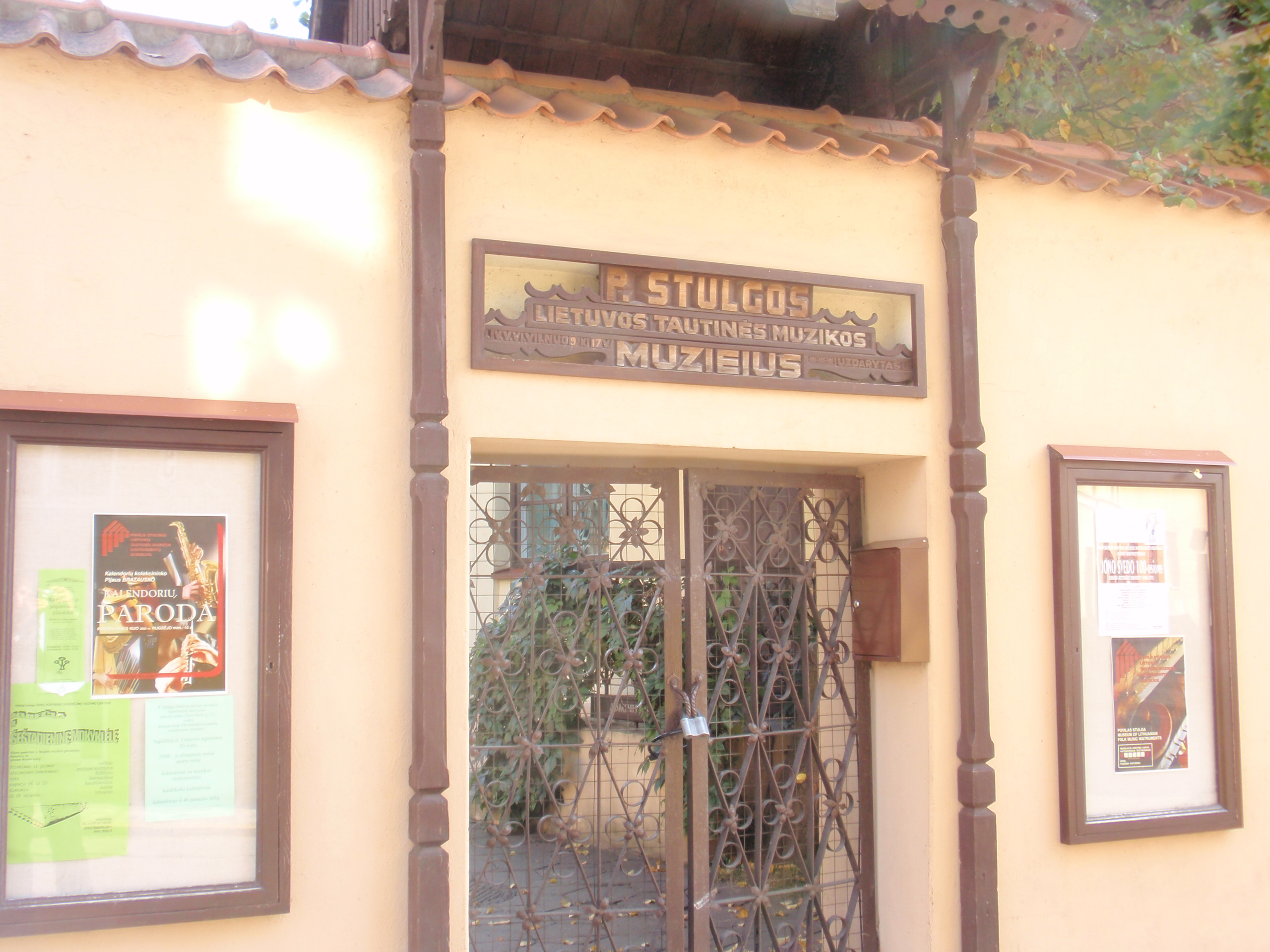
Entrance of the museum

The Povilas Stulga Museum of Lithuanian Folk Instruments (Lithuanian: Povilo Stulgos lietuvių tautinės muzikos instrumentų muziejus) is located in the Old Town of Kaunas, Lithuania. It was established in 1985. Its permanent collection contains Lithuanian and international musical instruments, recordings, books, placards, photographs, and letters. Its musical instrument collection includes various versions of the kanklės, harmoniums, reeds, seven-string guitars, and a bass constructed using a table.

== History ==
The museum was founded by the Kaunas City Council in 1985, as a branch of the Folk Museum of the Lithuanian SSR. The museum has had several changes of name. It opened as the Lithuanian Folk Music Instruments Museum, then became the Lithuanian SSR Folk Museum in 1989, followed by Povilas Stulga. In 2013 the museum became a branch of Kaunas City Museum, and is now called the Folk Music Museum. The museum is housed in a 16th-century Gothic house.

== Collection ==
The museum's permanent collection contains Lithuanian and international musical instruments, recordings, books, placards, photographs, and letters. Its musical instrument collection includes various versions of the kanklės, harmoniums, reeds, seven-string guitars, and a bass constructed using a table. It also has a Soviet-era electronic organ, and flutes made of bird feathers, and a musical staircase. The museum organizes exhibitions of national art, photography, folk art, domestic tools, musical instruments, and traditional clothing. It also hosts concerts and recitals and sponsors children's music lessons and excursions.

== See also ==
- List of music museums
