= Communication History Museum =

Coordinates: 54°53′49″N 23°53′06″E

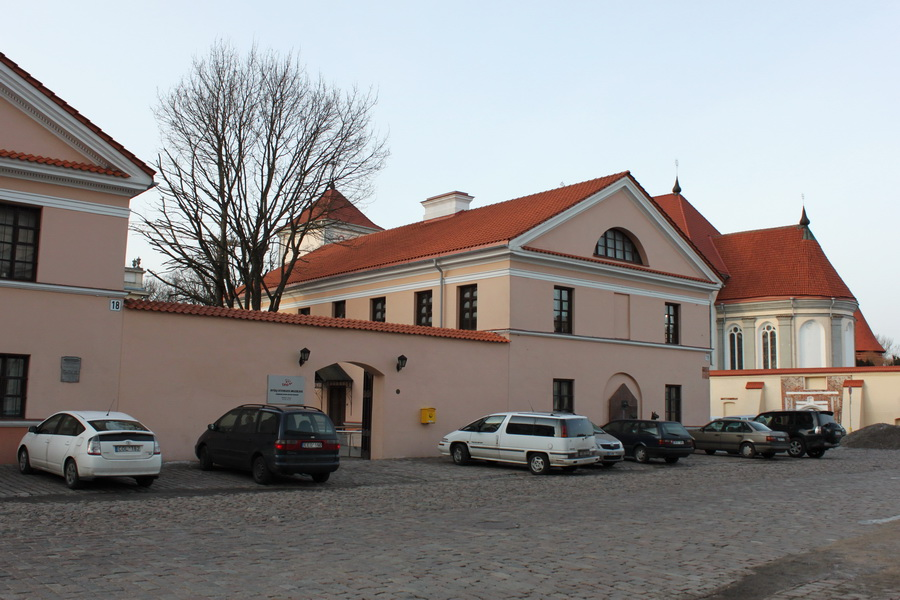
Communication History Museum in Kaunas

Former Communications History Museum was a museum supported by Teo LT AB, former AB Lietuvos Telekomas, in the Old Town of Kaunas, Lithuania. The building is an old merchant house, where were storages for grain to be exported. The building was taken in the use of the communications from 1830s in a form of the horse post and an inn according to the project by Joseph Poussier. It was one of the largest post stations in Europe. In the end of the 19th century Kaunas City Museum was situated in the building too.

After the Second World War the Soviet aviation unit took the building in its use. In the 1990s the buildings were handed to the Kaunas Association of Communications Companies and the reconstruction was made according to Saulė Mickevičienė's plan. The Communication History Museum opened it doors to the public in March 1994. A visitor himself may also test the operation of some old exhibits at the museum.

== Post ==
The exhibitions starts with post history. Special attention is paid to the beginning of the postal services in the 16th century and its development to the 19th century.

== Telegraph ==
In another part of the Museum there are rooms for electrical communications beginning from telegraphy, telephones, radios and television and in the end the satellite communications. There is one of the first electric communication devices that started to be used in Lithuania - S. Morse telegraph apparatus. Especially large is the exhibition of the radio receivers. An interesting detail is a Soviet television set manufactured in 1947.

As for the Soviet times, there is electronic computing machine Rūta-110 manufactured in Lithuania by Sigma company in 1970. In Lithuania was produced also a personal computer called Santaka.

In the end of the tour some Benefon phones can be seen in a corner.

The archaeological research has uncovered a forging kiln, which could have been used for casting bells or artillery cannons.
