= Kaunas Synagogue =

Orthodox synagogue in Kaunas, Lithuania

Kaunas Synagogue Choral Ohel Yaakov Synagogue
- Lithuanian: Kauno choralinė sinagoga
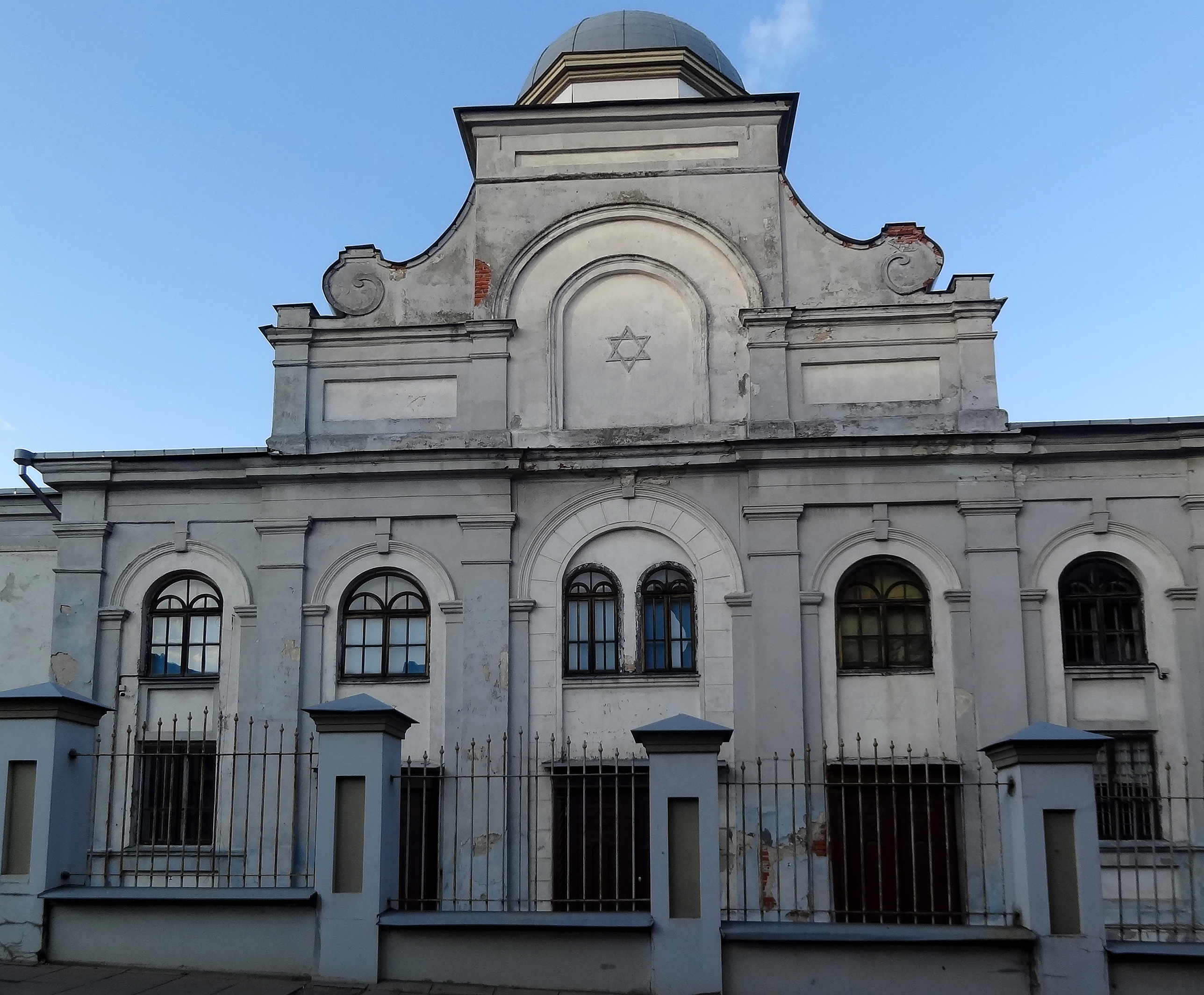
- The synagogue façade in 2019

- Location of the synagogue in Lithuania

Religion
- Affiliation: Orthodox Judaism
- Rite: Nusach Ashkenaz
- Ecclesiastical or organisational status: Synagogue
- Status: Active

Location
- Location: 13 East Ožeškienės Street, Centras eldership, Kaunas, Kaunas County
- Country: Lithuania
- Coordinates: 54°53′55″N 23°54′12″E

Architecture
- Architects: Justyn Golinewicz (Iustin N. Golinevich)
- Type: Synagogue architecture
- Style: Baroque Revival; Renaissance Revival; Moorish Revival
- Funded by: Lewin Boruch Minkowski
- General contractor: Edmund von Mikwitz
- Groundbreaking: 1871
- Completed: 1872
- Materials: Brick

The Kaunas Synagogue, also known as the Choral Ohel Yaakov Synagogue (Lithuanian: Kauno choralinė sinagoga), is an Orthodox Jewish congregation and synagogue, located at 13 East Ožeškienės Street, in Centras eldership, Kaunas, in the Kaunas County of Lithuania.

Designed by Justyn Golinewicz and Edmund von Mikwitz in an eclectic mix of the Baroque Revival, Renaissance Revival, and Moorish Revival styles, the building was completed in 1872 and is one of two operating choral synagogues in Lithuania.

== History ==
In 1902, before the Holocaust in Lithuania, it was one of over 25 synagogues and Jewish prayer houses in the city. The radically designed synagogue claims to have one of the most beautiful arks in the entire Jewish world.

The plot for the new synagogue was bestowed to the Kovno Jewish community by the merchant Lewin Boruch Minkowski, the father of Oskar Minkowski and Hermann Minkowski; until 1873 he also subsidized the major part of its construction. A memorial to the estimated 50,000 Lithuanian Jewish children killed during the Holocaust can be found at the rear of the building, complete with 37 stone tablets showing in which towns and cities they lost their lives and just how many of them died in each one.

On 20 April 2011, the anniversary of Hitler's birthday, a sign saying "Jews out" and "Hitler was right" ("Juden raus" "Hitleris buvo teisus") were hung in front of the synagogue.

== Gallery ==
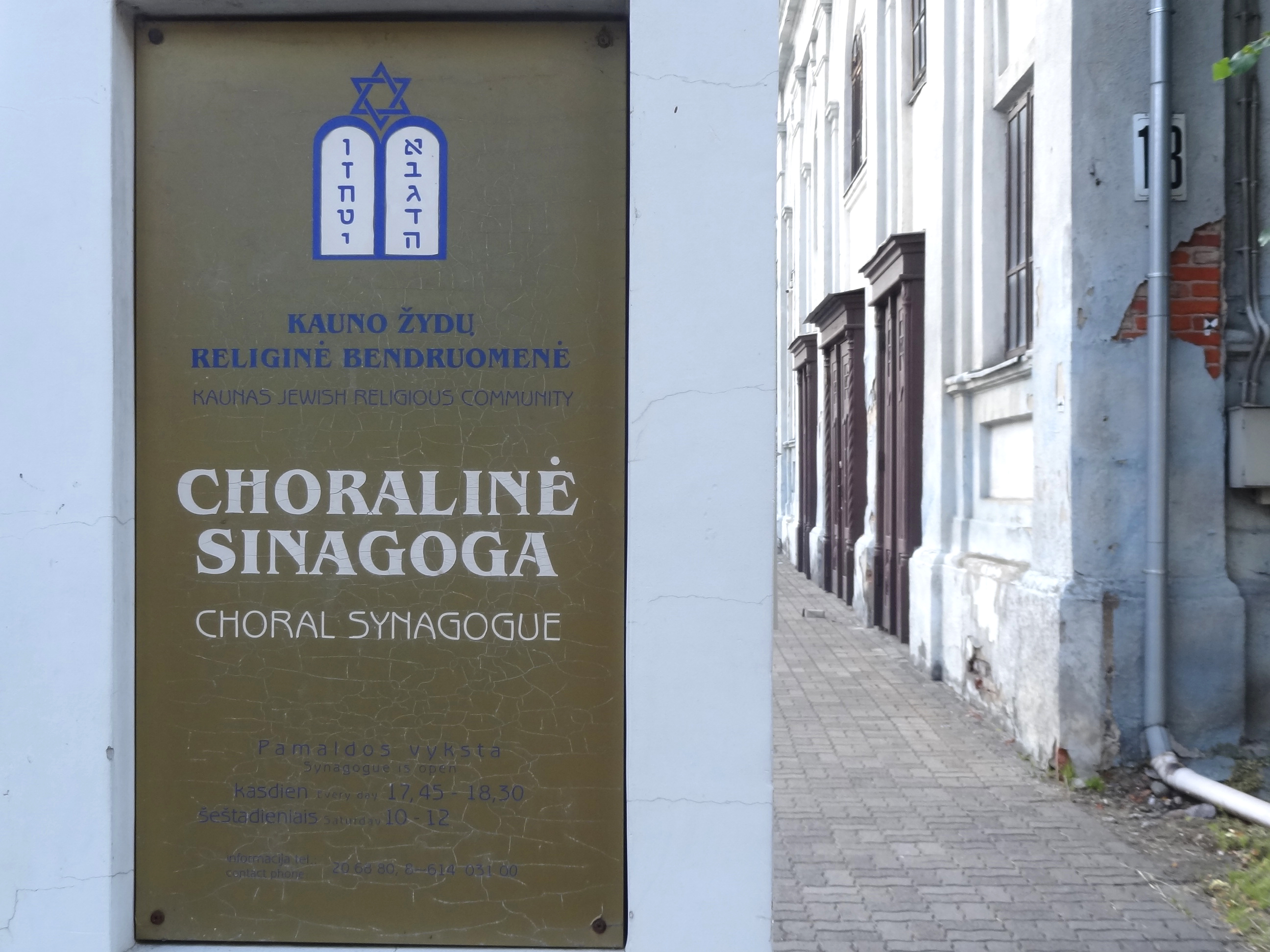
Synagogue entrance

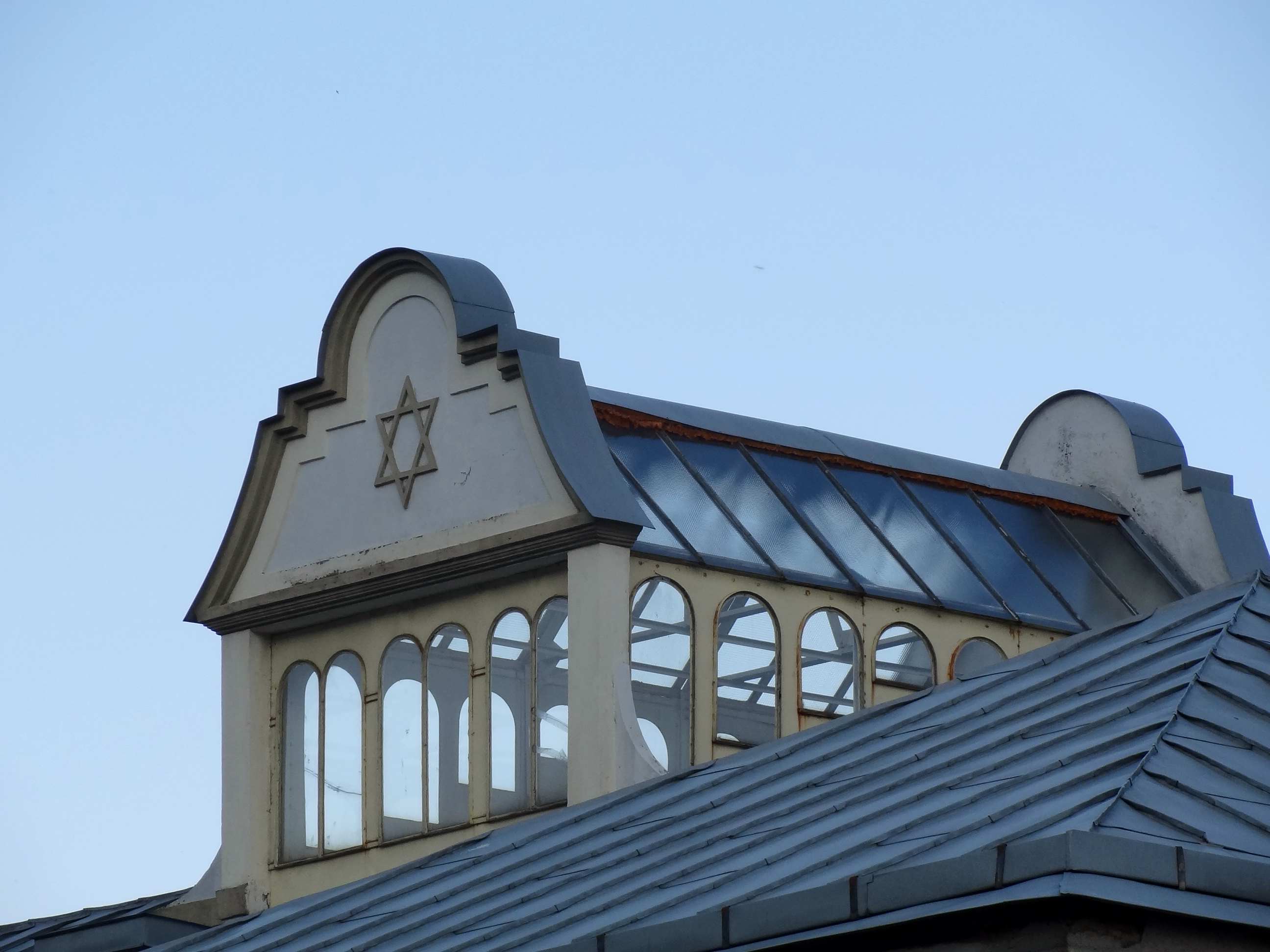
Structure on the synagogue roof

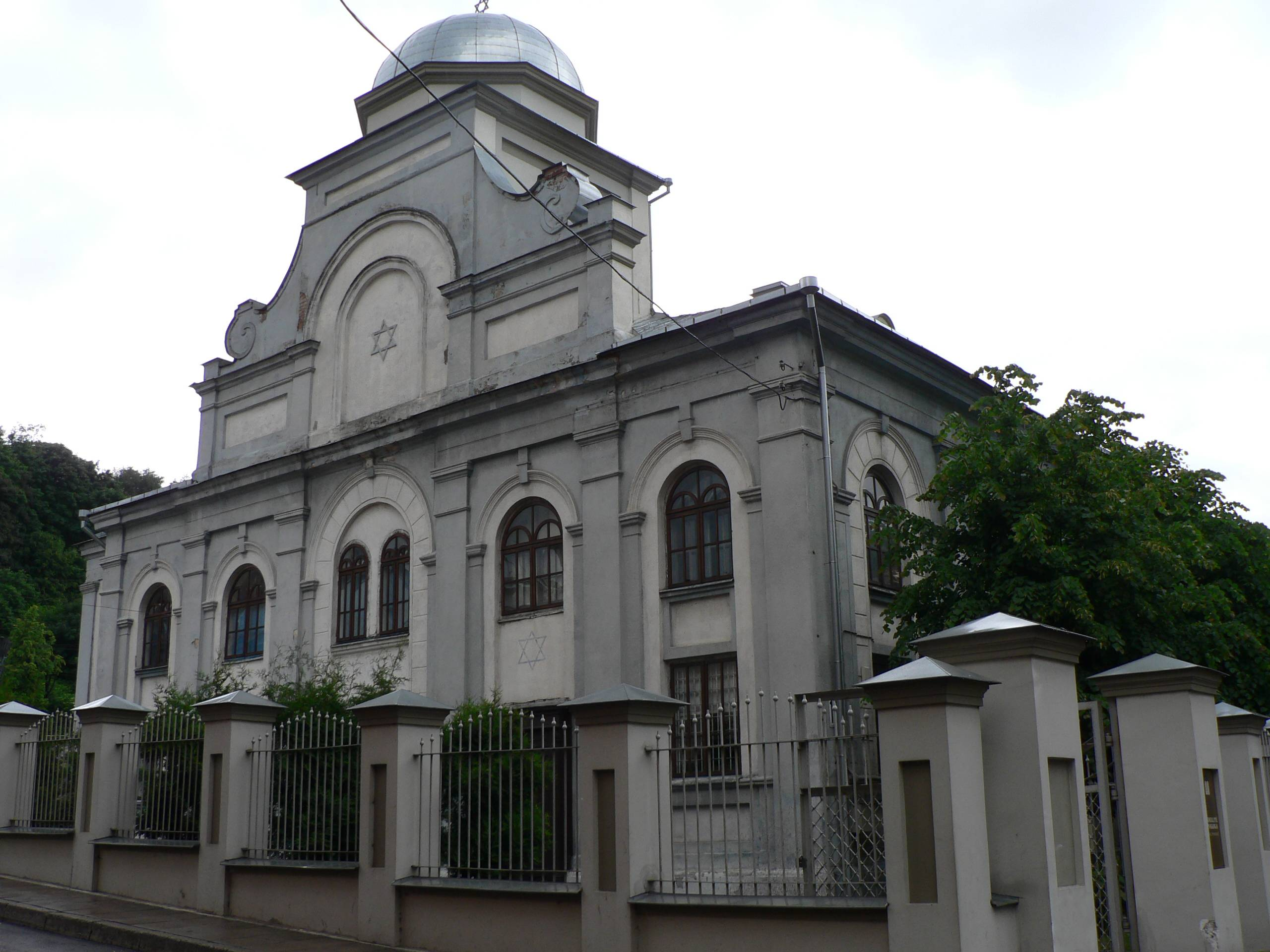
General view

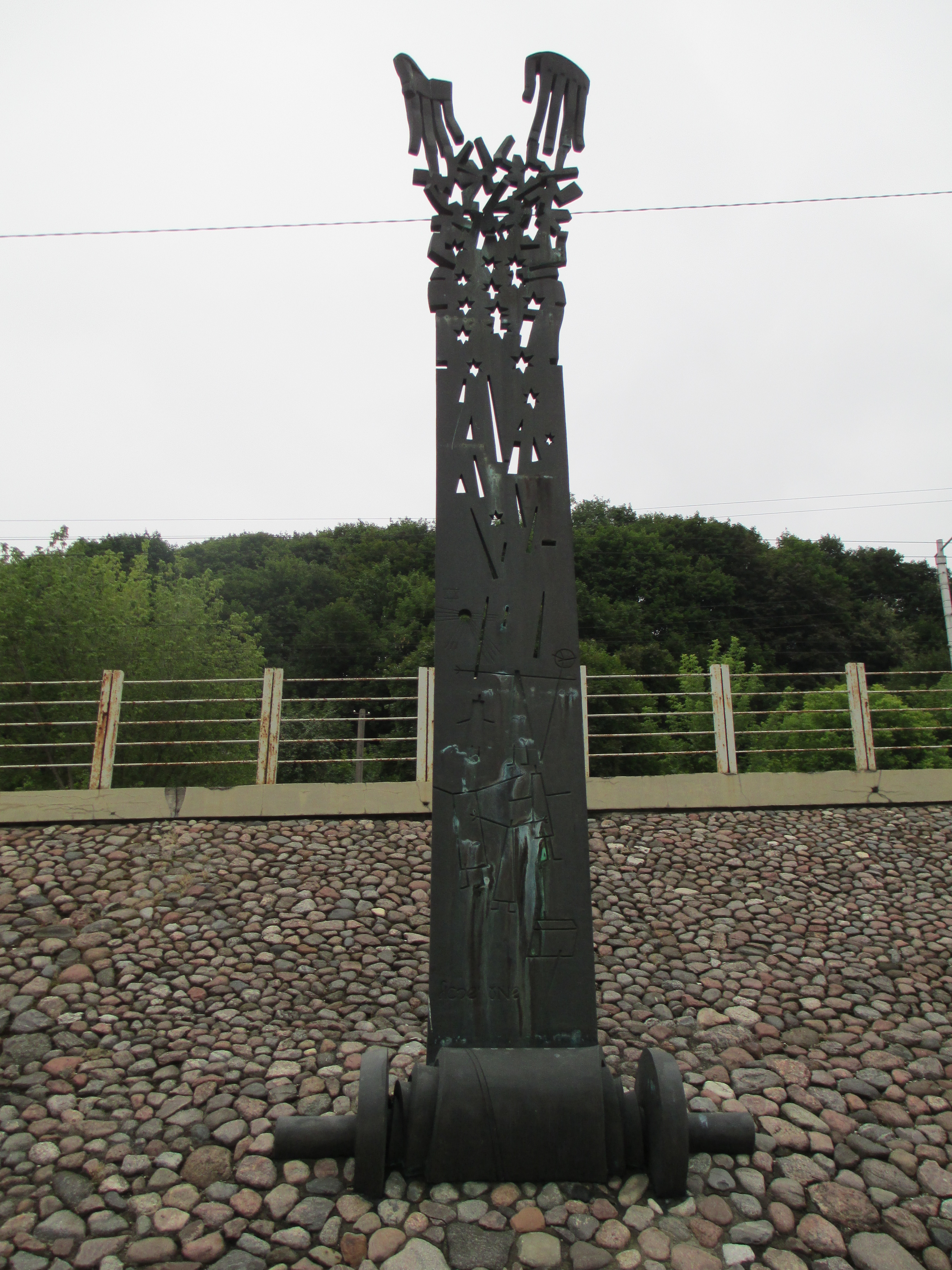
Holocaust memorial in front of the synagogue

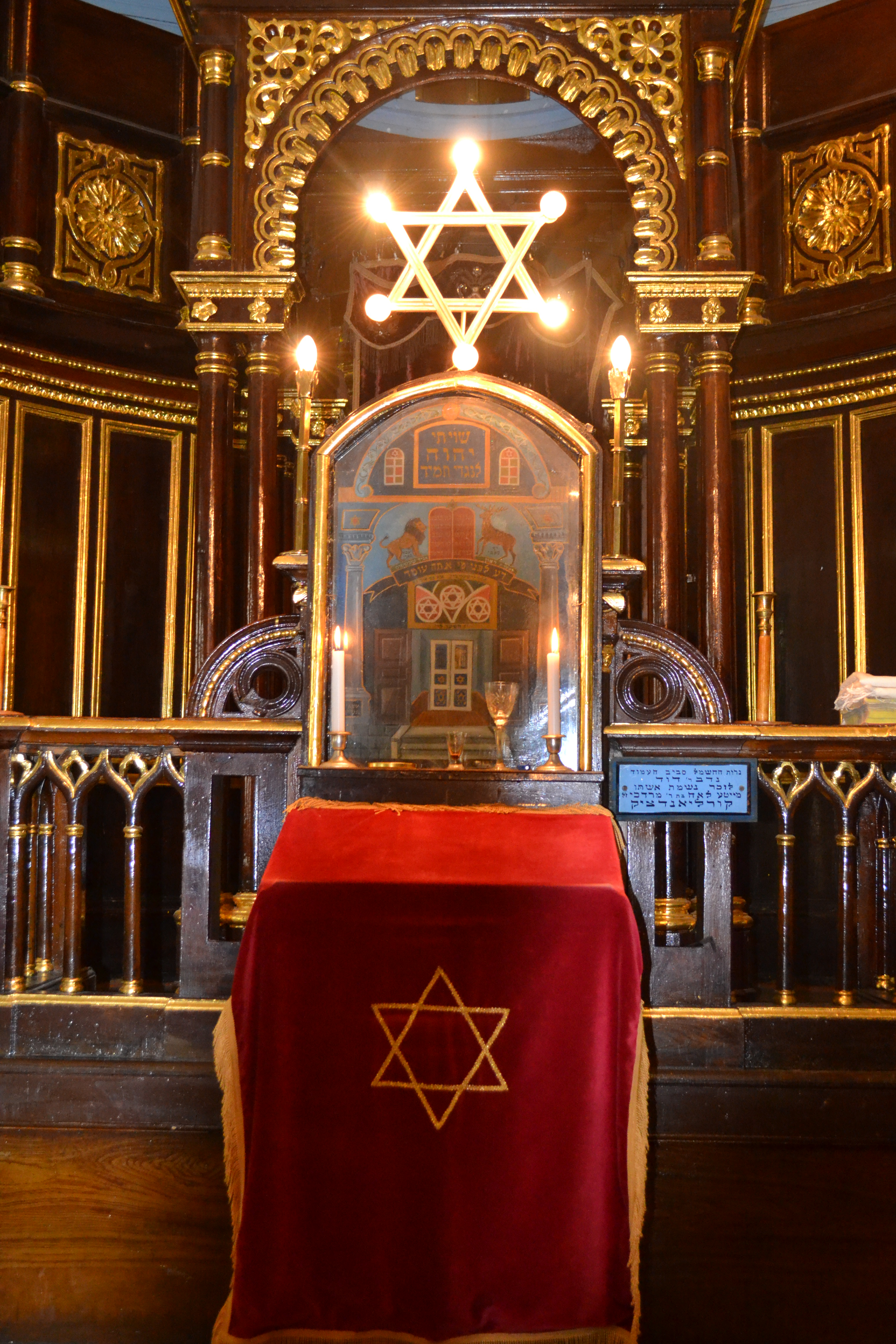
Synagogue interior

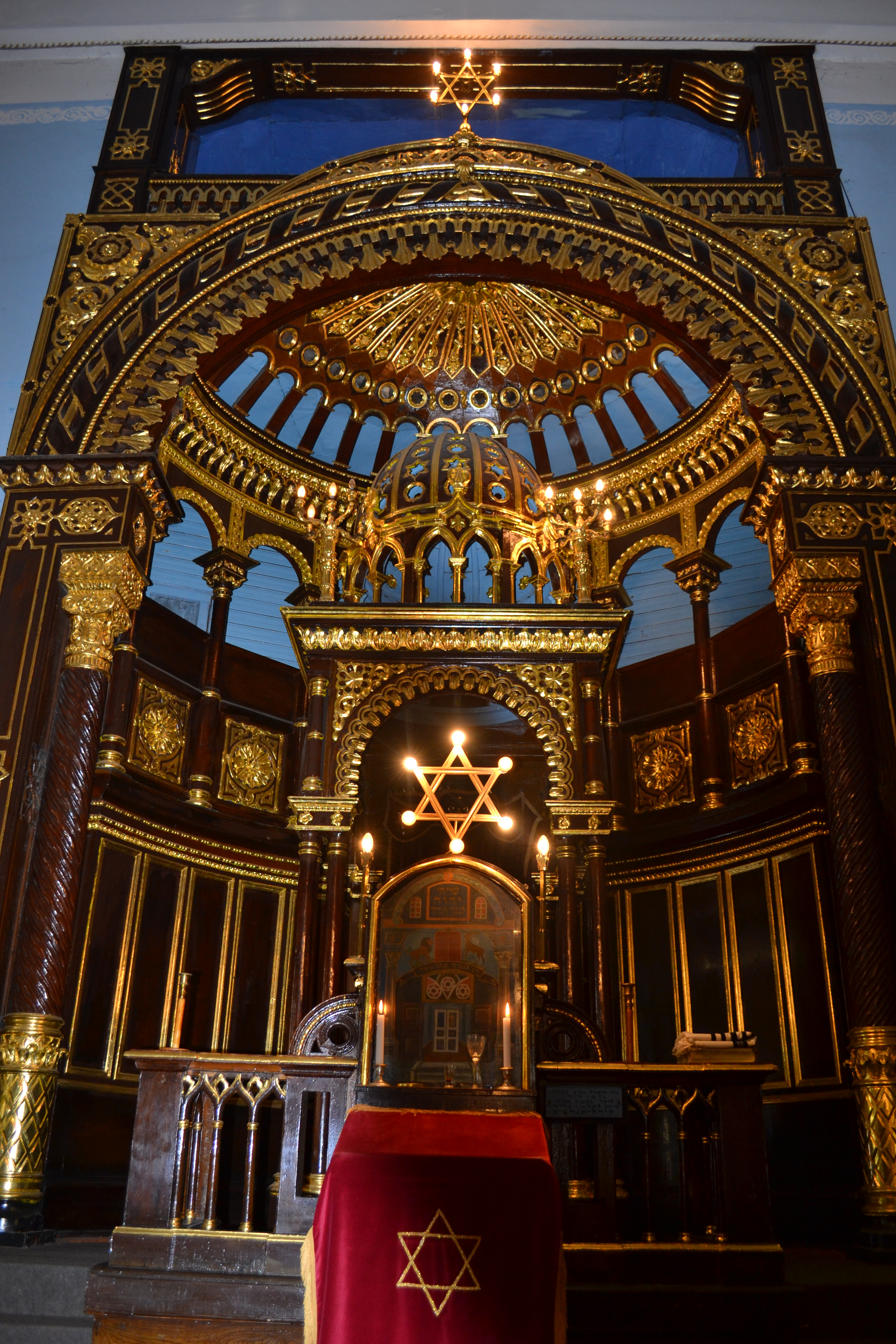
Synagogue interior

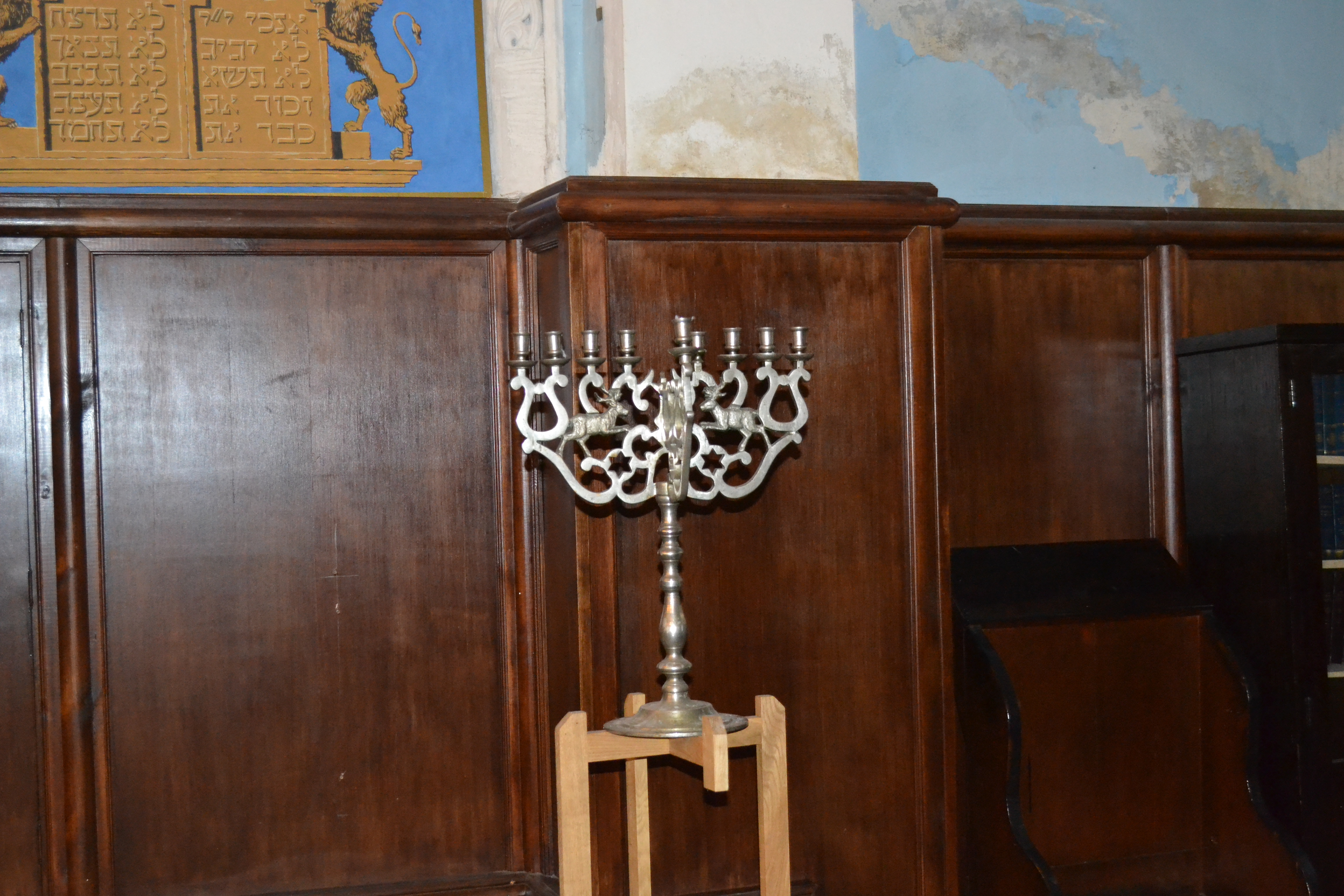
Synagogue interior

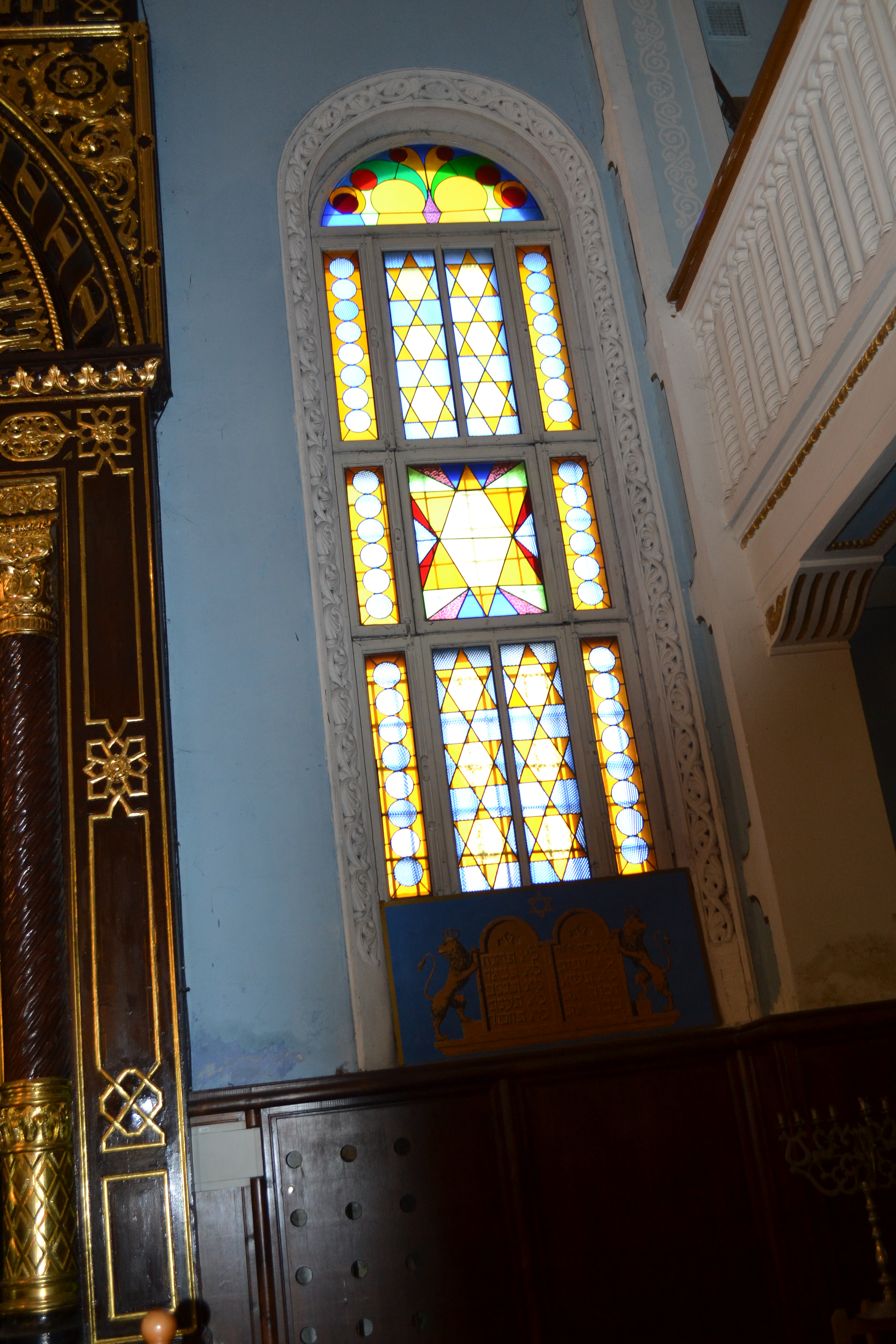
Synagogue interior

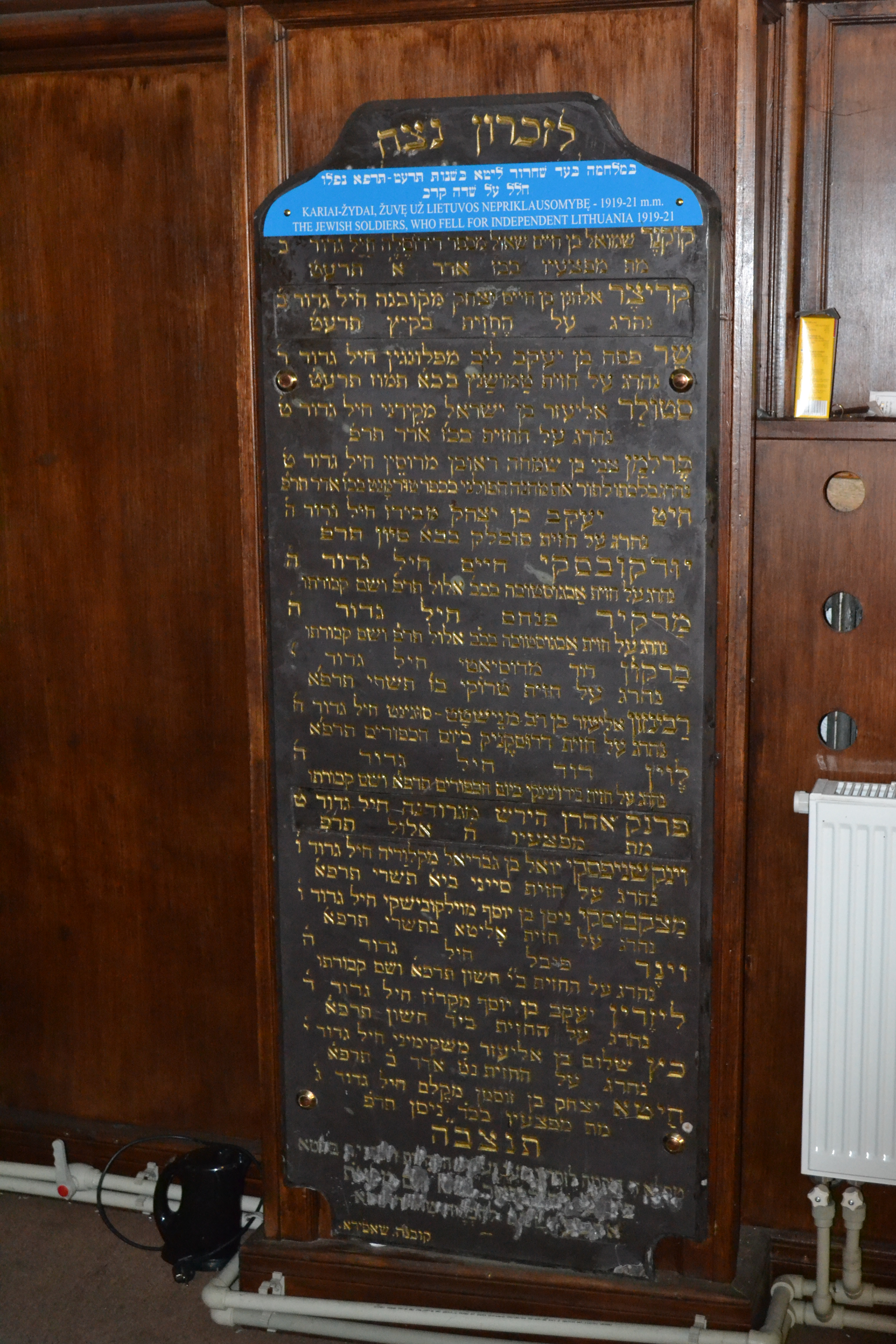
Synagogue interior

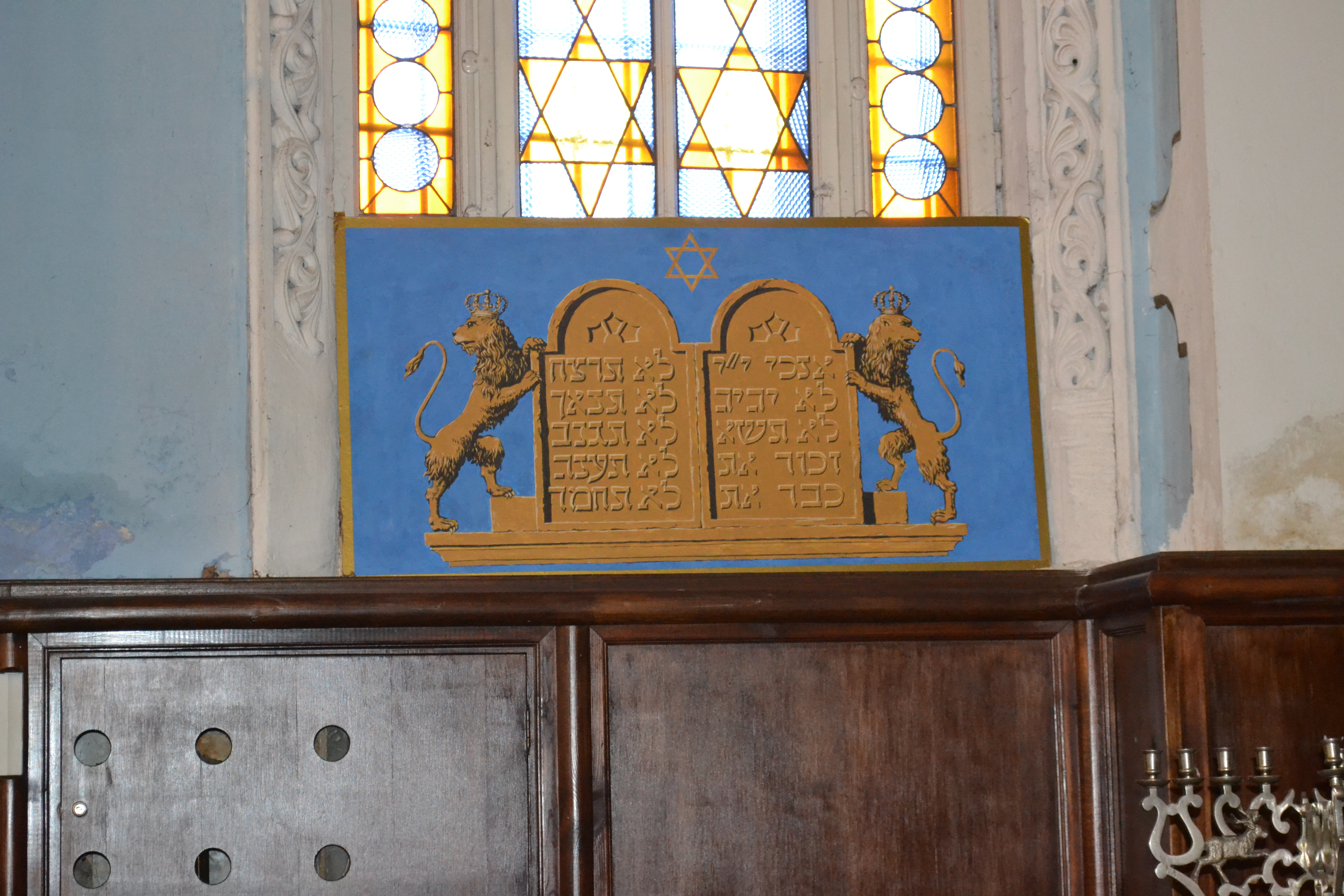
Synagogue interior

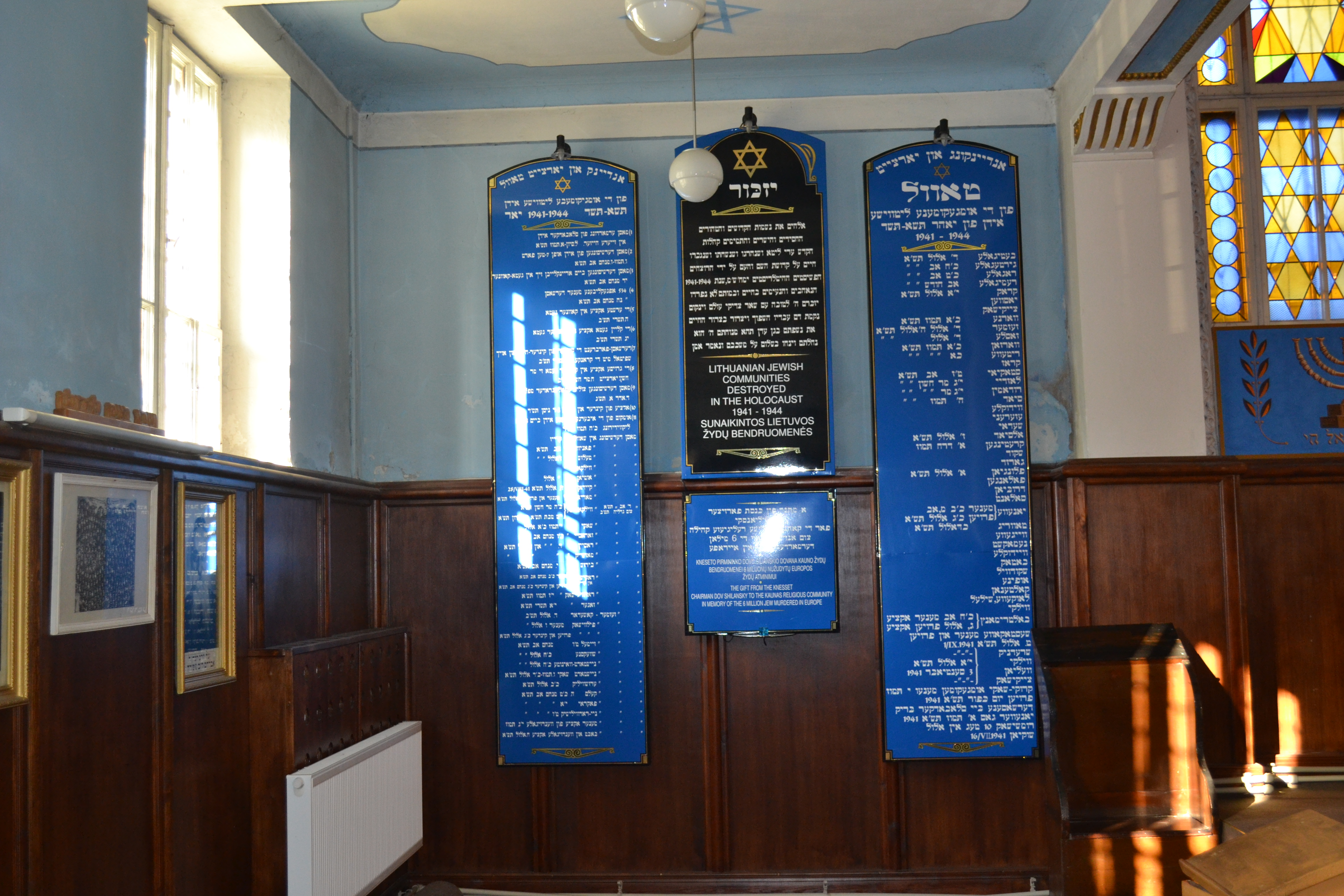
Plaques with those Jewish soldiers fallen in World War I and Holocaust victims from Kaunas

Chandelier

== See also ==
- History of the Jews in Lithuania
- Lithuanian Jews
