= Petras Vileišis Bridge =

Bridge in Lithuania

Coordinates: 54°54′11″N 23°53′26″E

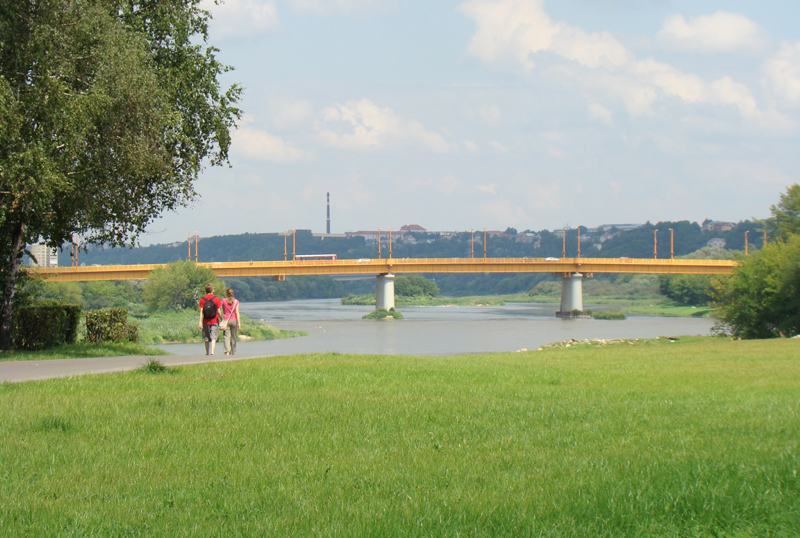
Petras Vileišis Bridge

Petras Vileišis Bridge formerly known as Vilijampolė Bridge is a bridge connecting Kaunas Old Town and Vilijampolė, Lithuania. It is the last bridge over the Neris River before its mouth. Its length exceeds 291 metres, width 14 metres. The bridge was completed during the interbellum period in 1929. The Vilijampolė Bridge across the Neris River received special attention from the Lithuanian rebels during the June Uprising in Lithuania in 1941 as they expected the Germans to enter the city using this bridge. When the Lithuanians got to the bridge, it was already wired by Red Army with explosives. 40 Soviet troops and three armoured vehicles protected the bridge and waited for the right moment to detonate. When the Soviets retreated a bit after facing Lithuanian fire, Juozas Savulionis ran to the middle of the bridge, cut the wires, and thus saved it from destruction. On his way back Savulionis was shot and killed by Soviet fire, becoming one of the first victims of the uprising. It was destroyed in 1944 by Wehrmacht as the Soviet forces were approaching. It was rebuilt in 1948 and renovated in 2008. It was named after Petras Vileišis, an engineer from Interbellum Lithuania.

== Image gallery ==
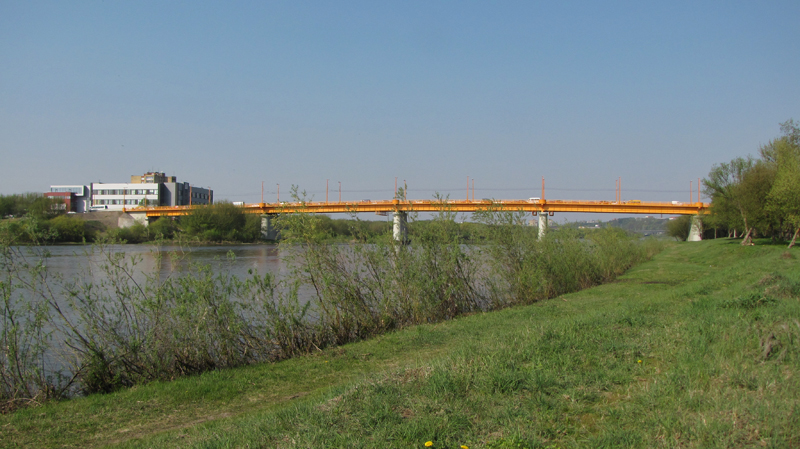
