= Oskar Minkowski =

German physician and physiologist (1858–1931)

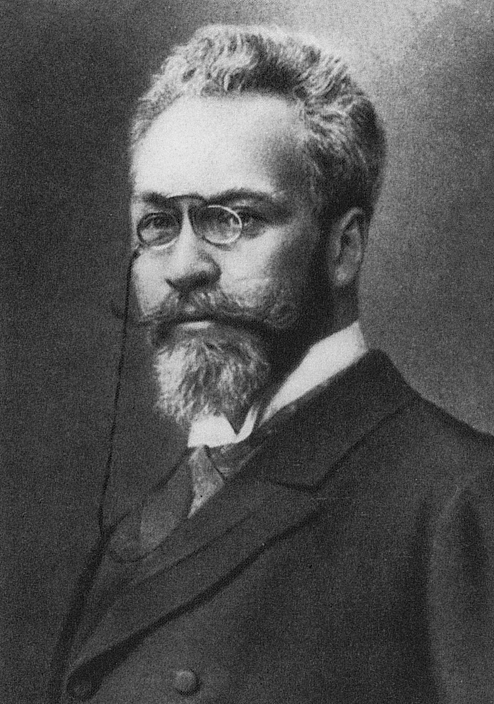
- Born: 13 January 1858; Aleksotas, Kovno Governorate, Russian Empire (now Lithuania)
- Died: 18 July 1931 (aged 73); Mecklenburg-Strelitz, Germany
- Known for: pancreas and diabetes
- Scientific career
- Fields: Diabetology
- Workplaces: University of Breslau

Oskar Minkowski (/mɪŋˈkɔːfski, -ˈkɒf-/; German: [mɪŋˈkɔfski] 13 January 1858 – 18 July 1931) was a German physician and physiologist who held a professorship at the University of Breslau and is most famous for his research on diabetes. He was the brother of the mathematician Hermann Minkowski and father of astrophysicist Rudolph Minkowski.

== Life and career ==
Born in Aleksotas, Kingdom of Poland, of Jewish origin, but later converted to Christianity. Minkowski was the son of Rachel (née Taubmann) and Lewin Boruch Minkowski (1825–1884), a first-guild merchant, who subsidized construction of the choral synagogue in Kovno.

== Discovery of the role of pancreas in diabetes ==
Minkowski worked with Josef von Mering on the study of diabetes at the University of Strasbourg. Their landmark study in 1889 in dogs induced diabetes by removing their pancreas. It was Minkowski who performed the operation and made the crucial link to recognize that the symptoms of the treated dogs were due to diabetes. Thus they were able to indicate that the pancreas contained regulators to control blood sugar; they also provided a model for the study of diabetes. Their work led other doctors and scientists to pursue further research on the relation of the pancreas to diabetes, and ultimately resulted in the discovery of insulin as a treatment for the disease.

- Joseph von Mering, Oskar Minkowski: Diabetes mellitus nach Pankreasextirpation. Centralblatt für klinische Medicin, Leipzig, 1889, 10 (23): 393–394. Archiv für experimentelle Patholgie und Pharmakologie, Leipzig, 1890, 26: 37. It begins with, After removal of the pancreas dogs get diabetes. It starts sometime after the operation and will persist for weeks continuously until their death...

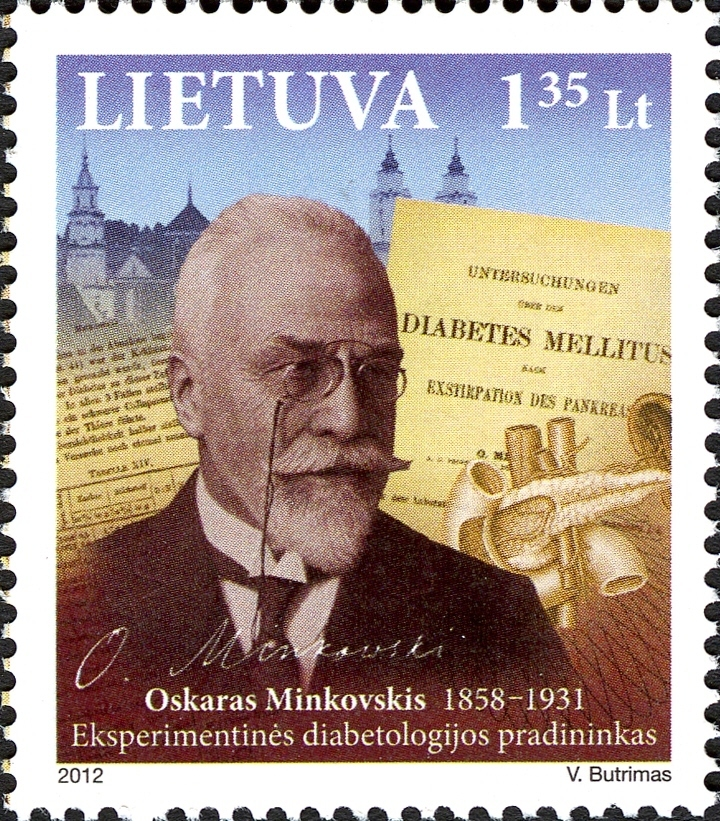
Minkowski on a 2012 Lithuanian stamp

== Minkowski Prize ==
In recognition of the discovery by Minkowski the European Association for the Study of Diabetes annually awards the Minkowski Prize for outstanding original work of a younger investigator in diabetes research.

== See also ==
- Minkowski-Chauffard syndrome
