= Twig Com =

Telecommunications company

Twig Com Ltd.
- Industry: Telecommunications systems
- Founded: 2011
- Headquarters: Salo, Finland
- Products: Personal safety and GPS tracking products
- Website: Twigcom.com

Twig Com Ltd. (formerly Benefon) is a mobile telecommunications company founded in 2011 and headquartered in Salo, Finland. The company develops and manufactures personal safety and GPS tracking products and software for worker protection, telecare, and asset tracking applications. The operation was originally started in 1988 as mobile phone manufacturer Benefon who began research on GPS safety phones in 1995 and launched the first commercial GPS/GSM safety phone, the Benefon Track, in 2000. Twig Com Ltd acquired Benefon's Twig business from GeoSentric OYJ through a purchase agreement signed in January 2011.

== History ==

In 1928, the Nordell & Koskinen radio factory was founded in the Finnish town of Salo. The factory later changed its name to Salora and specialised in shortwave radios, televisions and radio-phones. In 1979, when Salora and Nokia founded a joint company named Mobira, the manufacturing of mobile phones started in Salo. After some time working with in conjunction with Nokia, Jorma Nieminen (who was at the time heading Nokia's mobile phone section) and two colleagues parted ways with Nokia, and decided to start their own company, called Benefon, in 1988.

In 2004, facing financial difficulties, Benefon entered bankruptcy protection and launched a re-organisation program. Benefon's efforts to create a niche market in GPS telematics had met with some success (especially in commercial security markets) but had not been enough for the company to remain viable. Benefon entered a financial partnership with Octagon Holdings LLC and other investors, involving tens of millions of euros of new investment. On June 21, 2005, Benefon CEO Tomi Raita announced that Benefon was out of bankruptcy protection, and that its re-organisation had successfully concluded. In 2006, Benefon launched a new line of mobile phones with inbuilt GPS navigation under the "Twig" brand, including the "Twig Discovery", the "Twig Discovery Pro" and the "Twig Locator".

=== Sale and management buyout ===
In 2007, GeoSolutions acquired Benefon, later changing its name to GeoSentric, OYJ. In December 2011, GeoSentric divested the Twig mobile handset business inherited from Benefon. Twig's management team reportedly acquired ownership for the price of one Euro. Twig Com Ltd acquired the Twig business from GeoSentric. A purchase agreement was signed on 10 January 2011. Twig Com Ltd. "assumed all the liabilities and obligations of the former Benefon's handset business with regards to the transferring business, including its employees and assets".

== Products ==
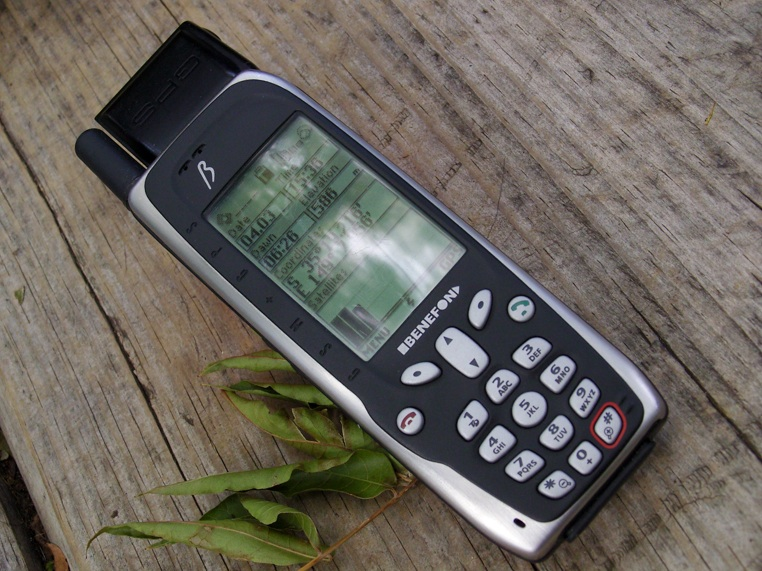
Benefon Esc!

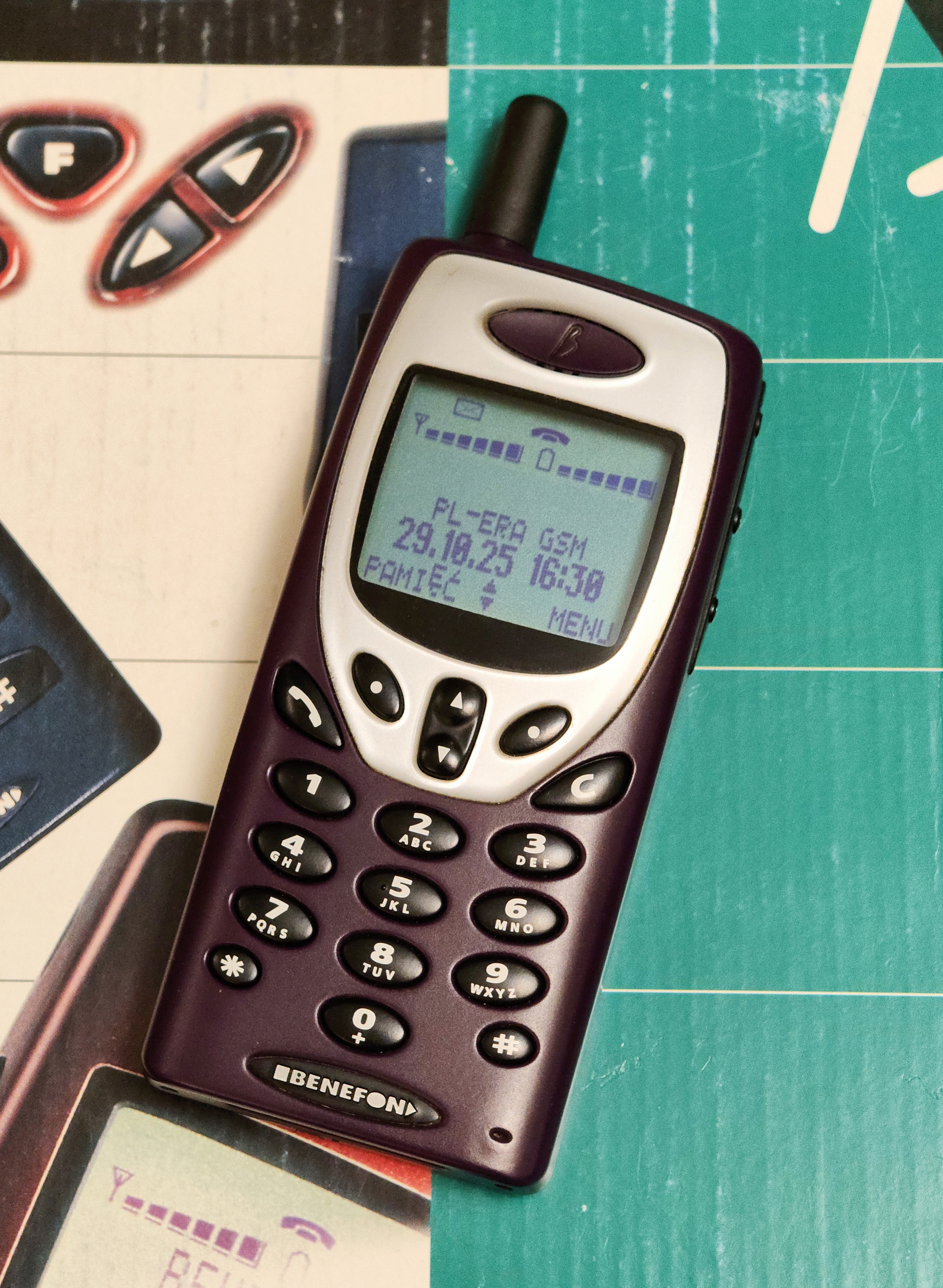
Benefon iO, digital GSM 900 cellular telephone.

In 1996 Benefon introduced the Alfa, Beta and Delta NMT-900 phones to the consumer market. However, by this stage, its former partner Nokia was already bringing to market GSM handsets such as the Nokia 1610. Benefon's first GSM phone was the 1997 Benefon Gamma, and the company continued to release new GSM handsets.

The Benefon ESC!, released in 1999, was introduced and was one of the first cellular devices with a built in GPS.

The Benefon Forte, operated on the NMT-450 standard and remained on the market for eleven years, until 2000. Engineered for tough operating conditions and equipped with a powerful antenna and transmitter, the phone found a niche operating on the edges of networks in industries such as shipping, since higher-frequency GSM coverage does not extend out to the sea.

Other mobile phone products included the Benefon Class that enabled cordless handset use, and the Benefon Smart, available in different colour options.

In 2000 Benefon released a Dual SIM phone Benefon Twin and Benefon Twin+. According to the company, it was the first dual-band GSM phone with two SIM-card slots. Benefon licensed the use of Microsoft Mobile Explorer 2.0 in 1999 to support both HTML and Wireless Application Protocol (WAP).

In response to the European Union's MORE-project (Mobile Rescue Phone), Benefon changed its focus to GSM+GPS mobile telematics equipment. The company launched what it later called "the first mobile phone and a GPS navigator integrated in one product", the Benefon Esc!, in late 1999, followed by the Benefon Track in 2000. The Esc! was splashproof and featured a large, greyscale LCD. Esc! allowed for users to load maps onto the phone, to trace their position and movement, and to call or send their coordinates via SMS to a list of set numbers by setting an "Emergency Key". It also featured a "Friend Find" service, whereby users with Esc! handsets could track each other's locations directly on their handset display. In some markets this feature was implemented online.

Twig Com products include personal safety and GPS tracking devices and software for worker protection, telecare, and asset tracking applications.

- TWIG Protector, a GPS/GSM personal protection and surveillance device intended to protect lone workers in hazardous areas
- TWIG Discovery Pro, a communication device that combines a triple band GSM mobile phone with a GPS receiver and TWIG telematics
- TWIG Locator, a GPS/GSM unit intended for personal protection, asset tracking and surveillance
- TWIG Tracer, an optional application for TWIG Discovery Pro
- TWIG Tracer maps, topographical maps for Tracer applications
- TWIG Web Finder, a Web service that lets users locate their TWIG devices

== Museums ==
Some vintage Benefon models are exhibited in museums such as Communication History Museum in Kaunas.
