= Kaunas Chamber Theatre =

Municipal theatre in Lithuania

Coordinates: 54°53′45″N 23°54′31″E

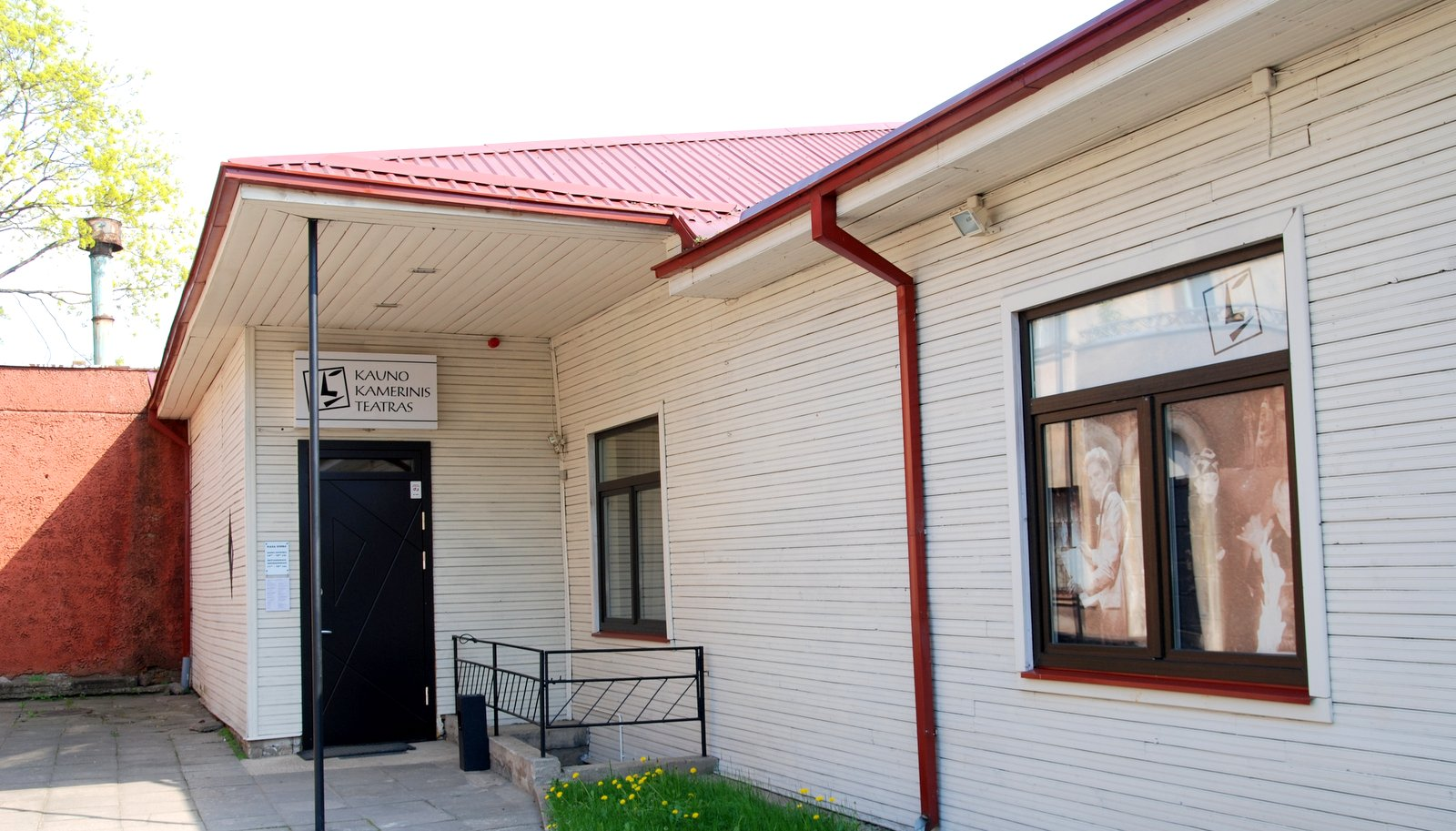
Entrance to Kaunas Chamber theatre

Kaunas city Chamber Theatre (Lithuanian: Kauno kamerinis teatras) is a municipal theatre in Kaunas, Lithuania. The theatre was established in 1976 as Kaunas Youth Musical Studio.[1] Its founder and long-standing director was the Lithuanian actor and opera singer Stanislovas Rubinovas.[2] The theatre obtained the status of a professional theatre in 1986 and was called Kaunas Youth Chamber Theatre. Its name was changed to Kaunas Chamber Theatre in 2005. After Stanislovas Rubinovas death, his son, actor and director Aleksandras Rubinovas, was leading the theatre as artistic director from 2014 till 2016. From April 2016 former municipal budget office Kaunas Chamber Theatre was replaced by the public institution Kaunas City Chamber Theatre. The theatre, in addition to his own productions, also started to represent chamber productions of other Lithuanian theatres more intensively.
