= Church of St. Francis Xavier, Kaunas =

St. Francis Xavier Church
- Šv. Pranciškaus Ksavero (Jėzuitų) bažnyčia
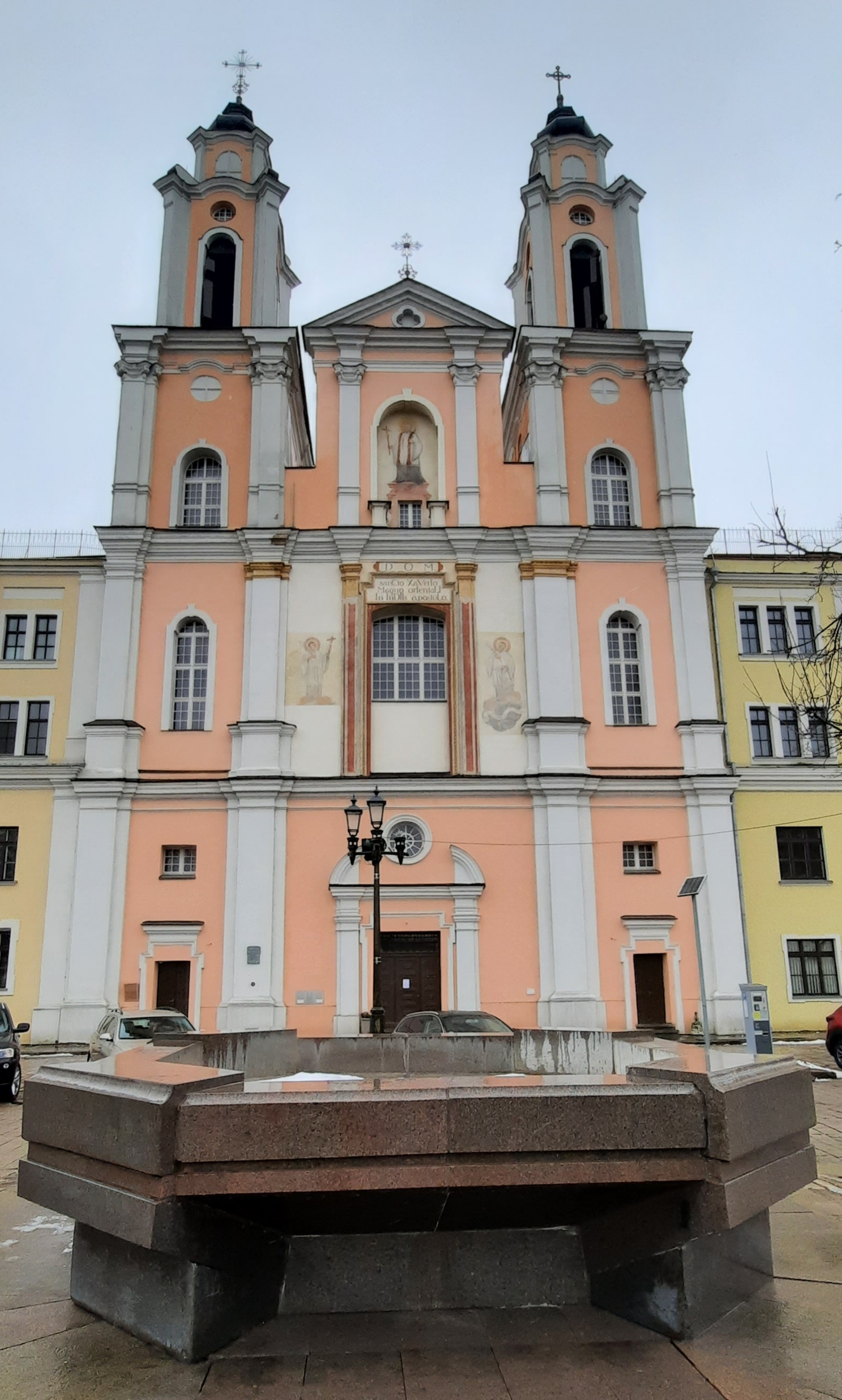
- Main façade from Rotušės square
- St. Francis Xavier Church
- 54°53′45.5″N 23°53′10″E; Location in Kaunas
- Location: Kaunas, Lithuania
- Denomination: Roman Catholic

History
- Status: Collegiate church
- Founder: Pranciškus Milvydas
- Dedication: St. Francis Xavier
- Consecrated: 1720

Architecture
- Architectural type: Church
- Style: Baroque
- Completed: 1720; 306 years ago
- Closed: 1812―1842

Administration
- District: Old Town, Kaunas
- Archdiocese: Roman Catholic Archdiocese of Kaunas

The Church of St. Francis Xavier (Lithuanian: Šv. Pranciškaus Ksavero bažnyčia) is a Roman Catholic church located in the Old Town of Kaunas, Lithuania. The church, dedicated to St. Francis Xavier, was built in the Rotušės square by Jesuits. The Jesuits opened their first residence in Kaunas in 1642 and established a chapel in the House of Perkūnas in 1643. Later, they also founded the first primary school in the city in 1649. The construction of the church started in 1666 and was completed in 1720. The church was consecrated in 1722.

== History ==
In 1642, the Jesuits were gifted a brick house in Kaunas by the brothers Albertas Kojelavičius-Vijūkas, Kazimieras Kojelavičius-Vijūkas, and Petras Kojelavičius-Vijūkas, which was used as a Jesuit residence until 1643, when the chapel of St. Stanislaus Kostka was built. Both were destroyed in 1655 during the war with Russia. In 1660, a new wooden chapel and residence were built, but in 1666, the Jesuits decided to construct a stone church.

The present Baroque church was constructed in 1720 under the auspices of Father Pranciškus Milvydas, with the towers being completed a short time later, in 1725. However, in 1732, a fire devastated the St. Francis Xavier church and adjacent Jesuit structures within the city. The blaze led to the eventual collapse of the church's roof, supporting arches, and tower. Between 1746 and 1751, the tower of the church was reconstructed. Subsequent efforts in 1752 included the construction of a burial vault and the bricklaying of the foundations of the main altar. Between 1753 and 1754, three new stone altars were constructed. The main altar was decorated with marbleizing by the master craftsman Jonas Kerneris. The mouldings and sculptures were executed by the sculptor Antonis Dacratas (Datzrath). By the close of the 18th century, the sanctuary had been adorned with 12 baroque altars.

In 1773 Pope Clement XIV issued Dominus ac Redemptor and the Jesuit Order in Lithuania eventually was forced to disband. Jesuits left Kaunas, and the church was transferred to the Franciscans in 1787. After the partitions of the Polish–Lithuanian Commonwealth, Lithuania was annexed by the Russian Empire. Russian authorities instituted a vigorous policy of russification and closed the church in 1812. In 1842, the former Catholic church was transformed into Russian Orthodox Church and all 11 altars were demolished.

During the World War I, the church was once again damaged by fire. Not long after Lithuania was restored, the Church of St. Francis Xavier was returned to the Jesuit Order in 1923. In 1924, services were resumed and a gymnasium was established. In 1930, the headquarters of the Lithuanian Jesuit Vice-Province was founded. In the aftermath of the World War II, in 1949, the monastery and the church were closed down by the occupying Soviet authorities. The buildings were subsequently utilised for general and technical schools, while the church's interior was converted into a sports hall.

Following the second restoration of Lithuania's independence, the church and the monastery buildings were once again returned to the Jesuits in 1990, and the Jesuit Gymnasium was reestablished in 1991. After the completion of restoration works, the church was reconsecrated on 30 August 1992. In 2015, a project to renovate the façade of the St. Francis Xavier Church was initiated. The restoration of the church's frescoes, featuring a composition of three saints, was completed in December 2016. The frescoes, which adorn the ceiling, depict the three patron saints of the church: St. Francis of Assisi in the middle, St. Stanislaus Kostka on the right and St. Aloysius Gonzaga on the left.

== Gallery ==
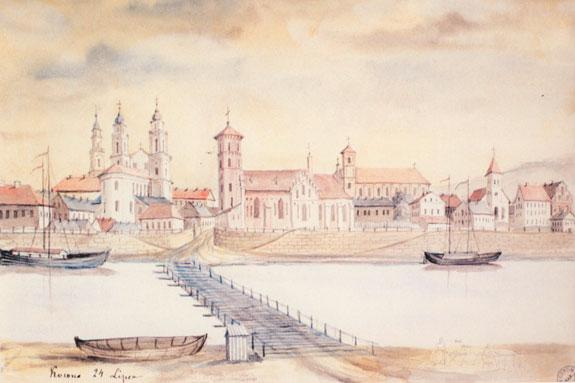
Kaunas Old Town, by Napoleon Orda, 1875

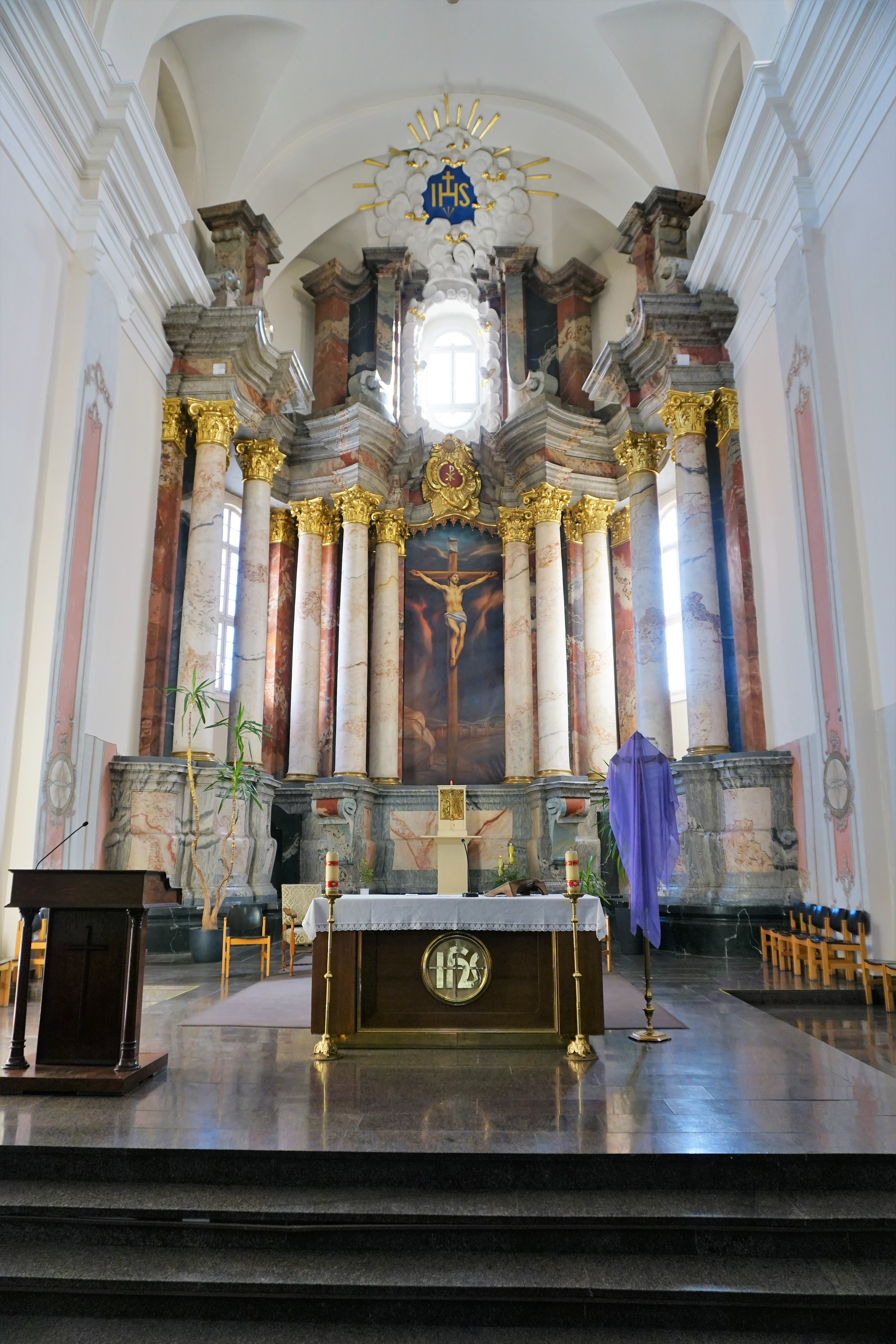
Central altar

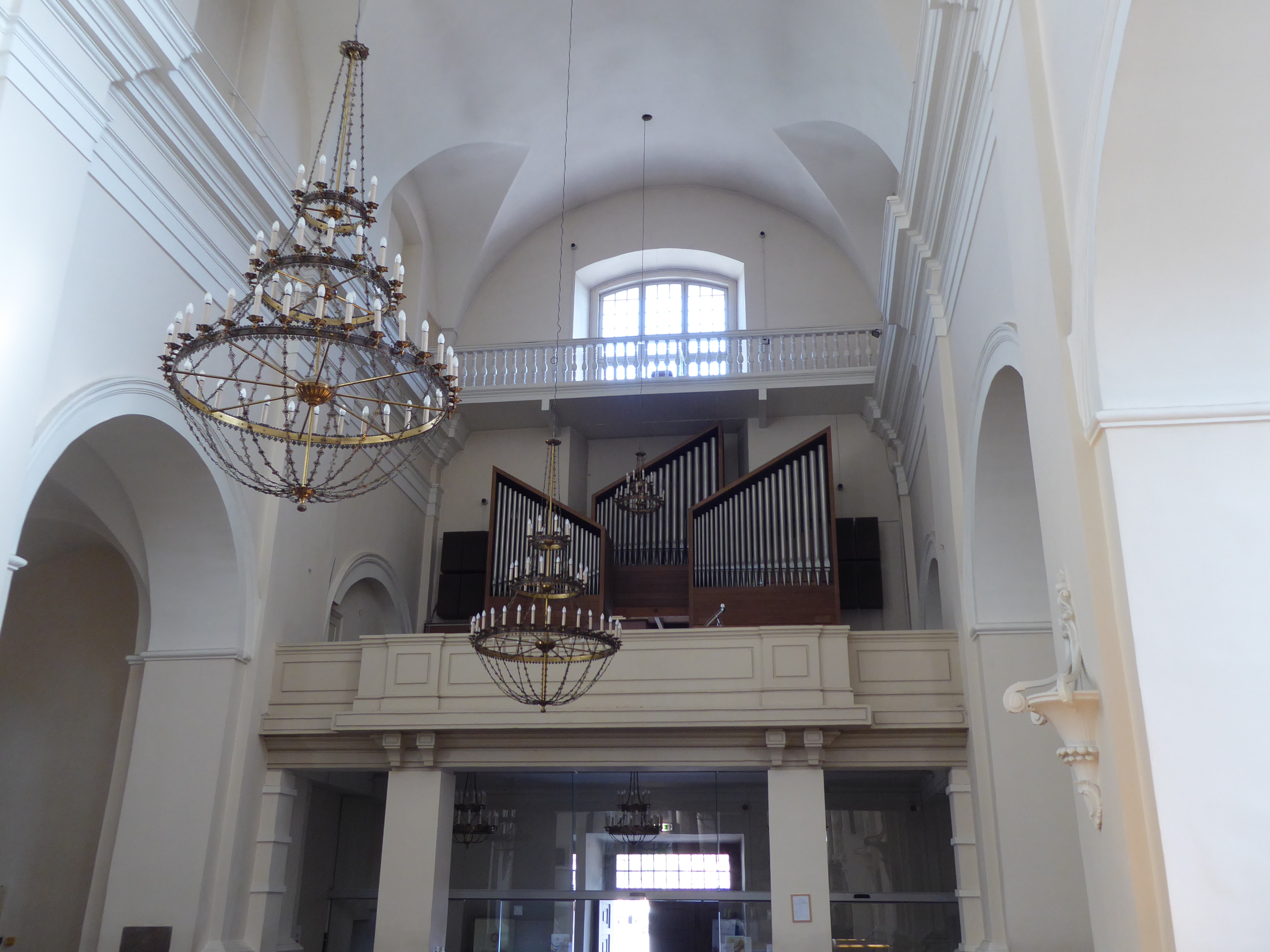
Organ

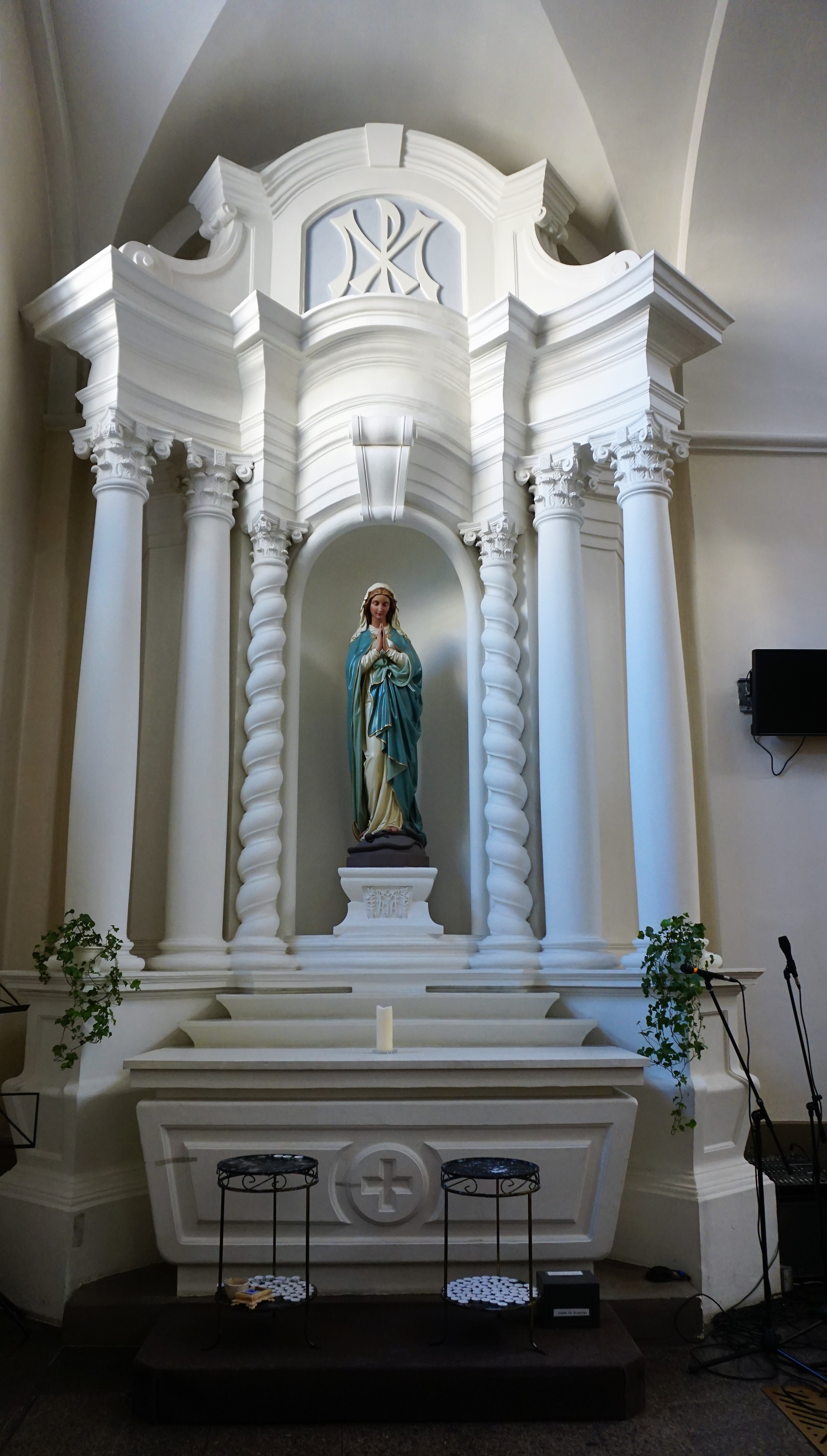
One of the altars

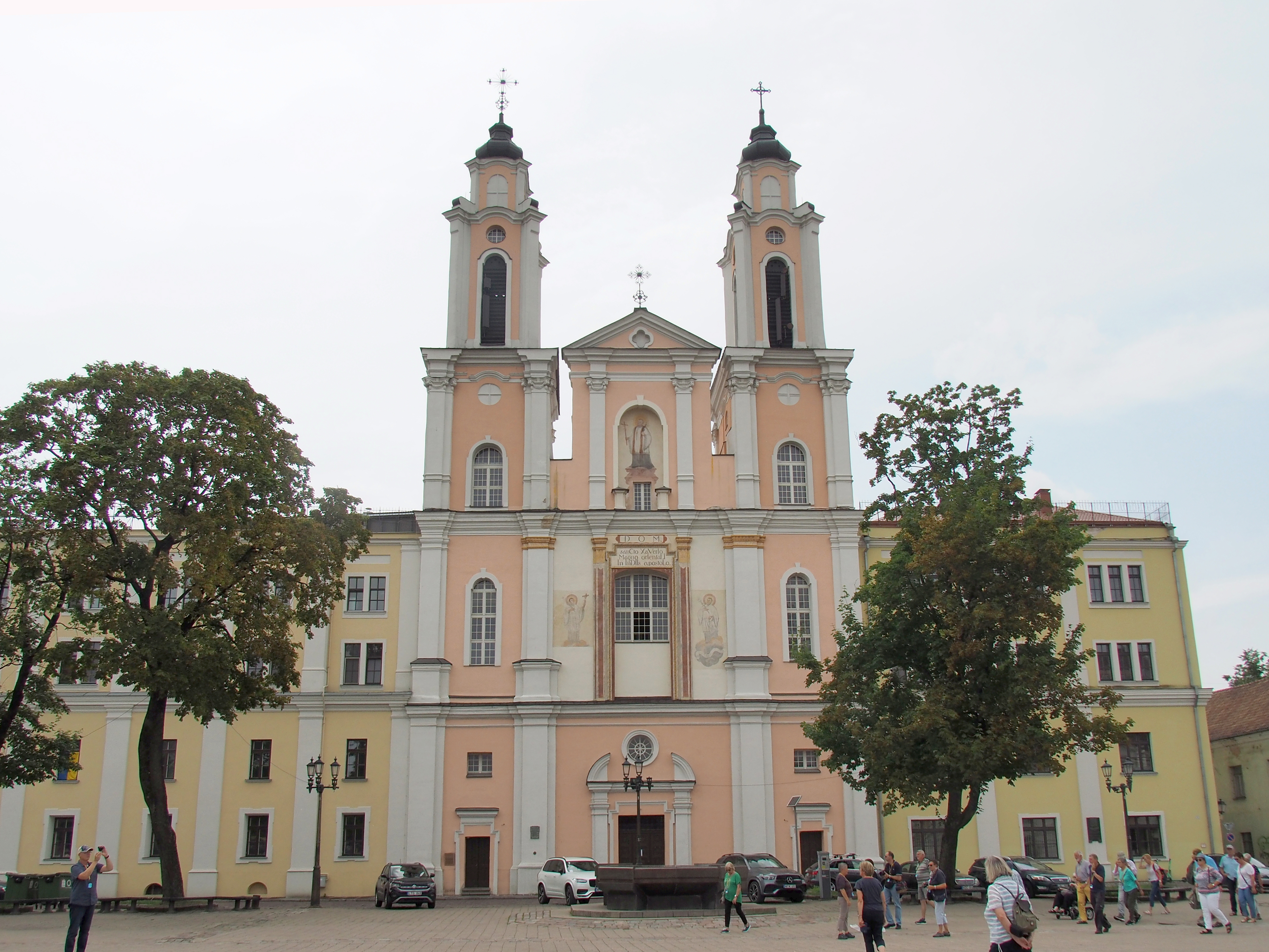
Further view with monastery buildings

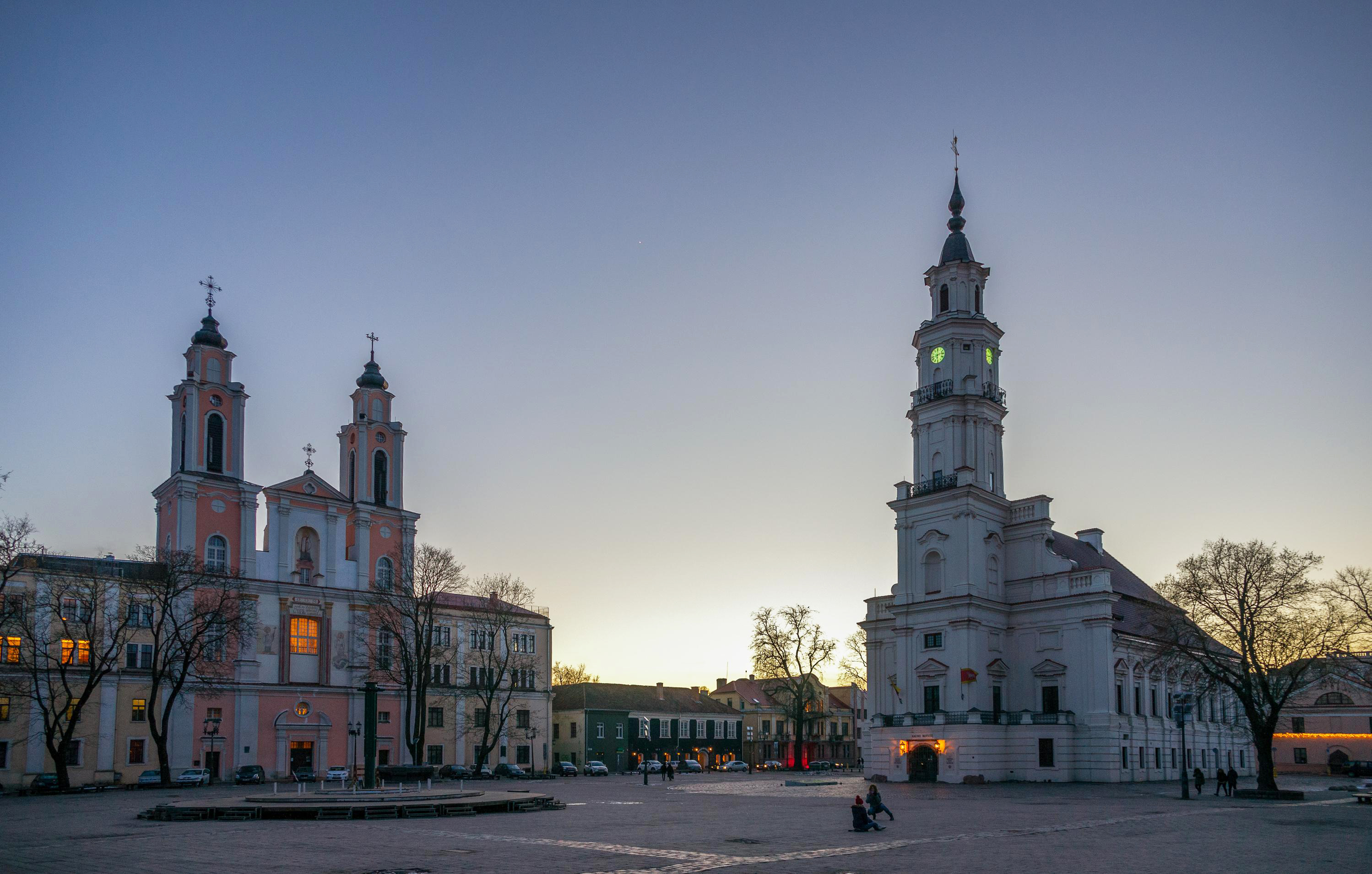
Church of St. Francis Xavier and Kaunas Town Hall

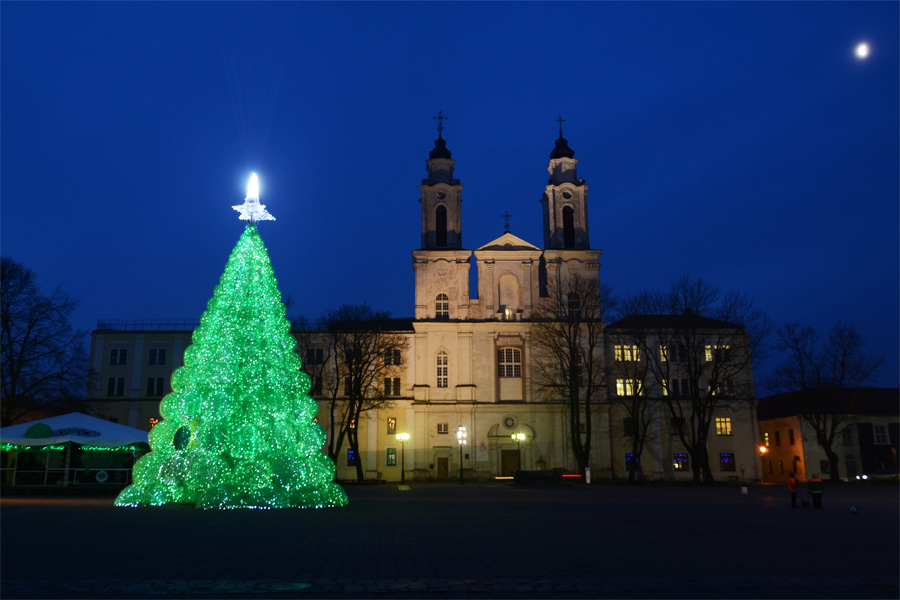
Christmas tree near the Church of St. Francis Xavier

== See also ==
- List of Jesuit sites
