= Church of Vytautas the Great =

- Church of the Assumption of the Blessed Virgin Mary
- Vytauto Didžiojo bažnyčia (Lithuanian)
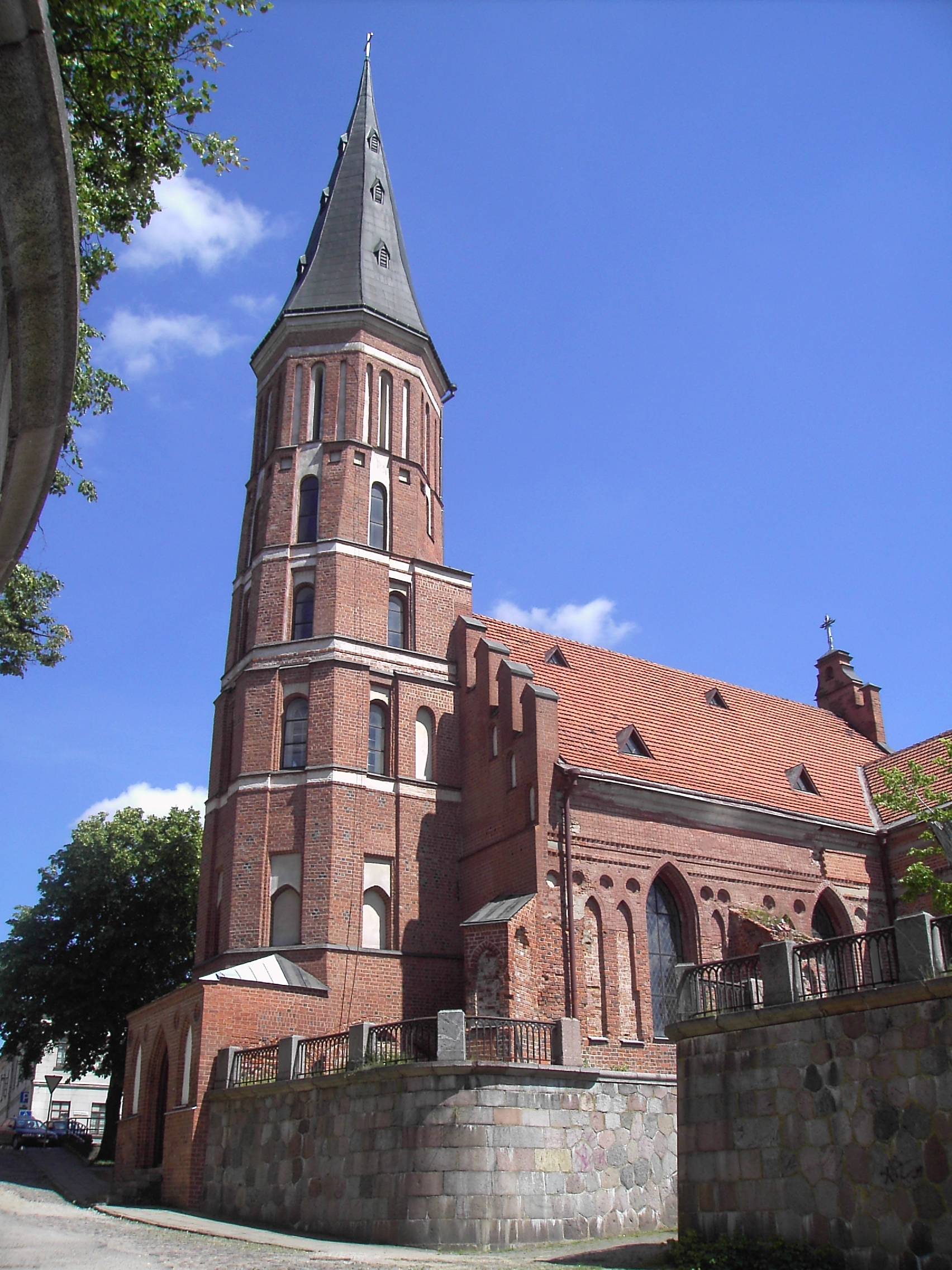
- Church's southern façade
- Church of Vytautas the Great
- 54.8950°N 23.8865°E; Location in Kaunas
- Location: Aleksoto g. 3, 44280 Kaunas
- Country: Lithuania
- Denomination: Roman Catholic
- Website: Official website

History
- Status: Collegiate church
- Founder: Grand Duke Vytautas the Great
- Dedication: Assumption of Mary

Architecture
- Functional status: Active
- Style: Brick gothic
- Groundbreaking: c. 1400
- Completed: 16th century
- Closed: 1845-1853

Administration
- Archdiocese: Metropolitan Archdiocese of Kaunas

Cultural Monuments of Lithuania
- Type: National
- Designated: 2002-10-15
- Reference no.: 825

Church of Vytautas the Great (Lithuanian: Vytauto Didžiojo bažnyčia) or the Church of the Assumption of the Blessed Virgin Mary (Lithuanian: Mergelės Marijos ėmimo į dangų bažnyčia) is a Roman Catholic church in the Old Town of Kaunas, Lithuania, and is the oldest church in the city and an important example of Gothic architecture in Lithuania, having the only Gothic cross-shaped plan (with side chapels) in Lithuania.

== History ==
The Church of the Assumption of the Virgin Mary is the oldest Gothic building in Kaunas, though the foundation documents for the structure are not known to exist (they have either been misplaced or destroyed). According to the Jesuit historian Albertas Kojelavičius-Vijūkas, the church was constructed under the auspices of Vytautas the Great in 1400 as a commendation to the Blessed Virgin Mary for saving his life after a major defeat in the Battle of the Vorskla River, and was subsequently overseen by Franciscan friars invited from Vilnius.

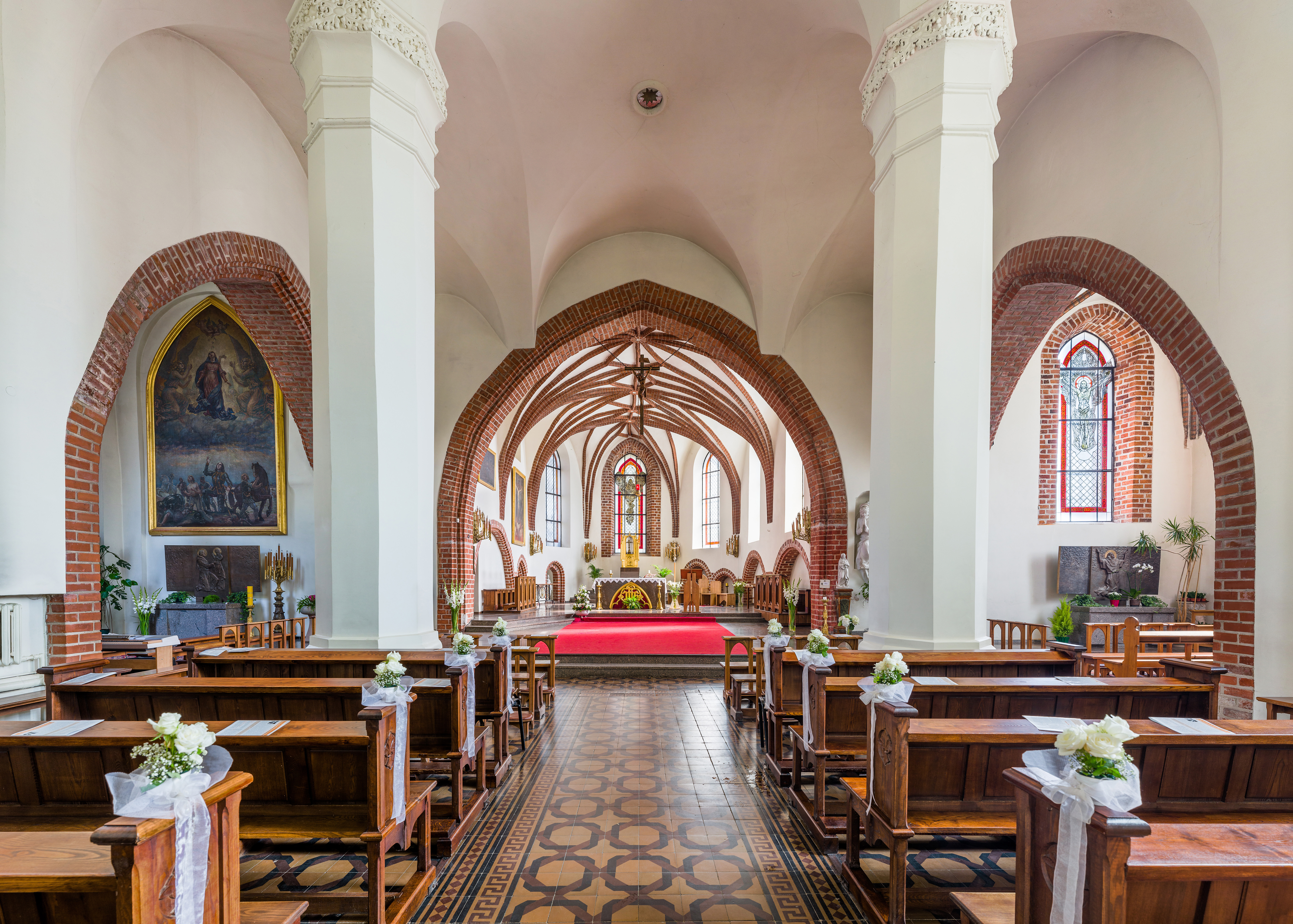
Church interior

The earliest extant documentary reference to the church dates back to 1439. It is assumed that a wooden or stone church was constructed around 1400, which was subsequently replaced by a new brick church, i.e. the present building. The tower was erected at the end of the 15th or beginning of the 16th century.

During the major fires that afflicted Kaunas in 1603, 1624 and 1668, the church, situated away from the conflagrations and on the banks of the Nemunas river, was likely to have sustained minimal damage when compared with other structures in the city. Nevertheless, it was subsequently almost destroyed by the Russian army in 1655 during the war between the Tsardom of Russia and the Polish–Lithuanian Commonwealth. In 1669, a brick monastery was erected in the vicinity, comprising three two-storey blocks.

At the beginning of the 18th century, the church was once again severely damaged during the Great Northern War, and in 1812, precisely one hundred years later, the Grande Armée, which had occupied Kaunas, established an armoury in the church. Subsequently, the armoury was set alight as the French army retreated after the failed French invasion of Russia, resulting in the complete destruction of the church interior. In 1819, the church underwent further restoration, initiated by the Franciscan Abbot, Grigalius Golickis, which included the construction of new vaults and the paving of the floor with bricks. After the Commonwealth was partitioned, the Grand Duchy of Lithuania came under Russian rule, and as part of a rigorous policy of consolidating Orthodoxy and Russification, the church was closed in 1845 and the monastery was abolished. Following a period of abandonment, the sanctuary was converted into a winter Orthodox church between 1850 and 1853, at which time it was renamed St. Nicholas's Church.

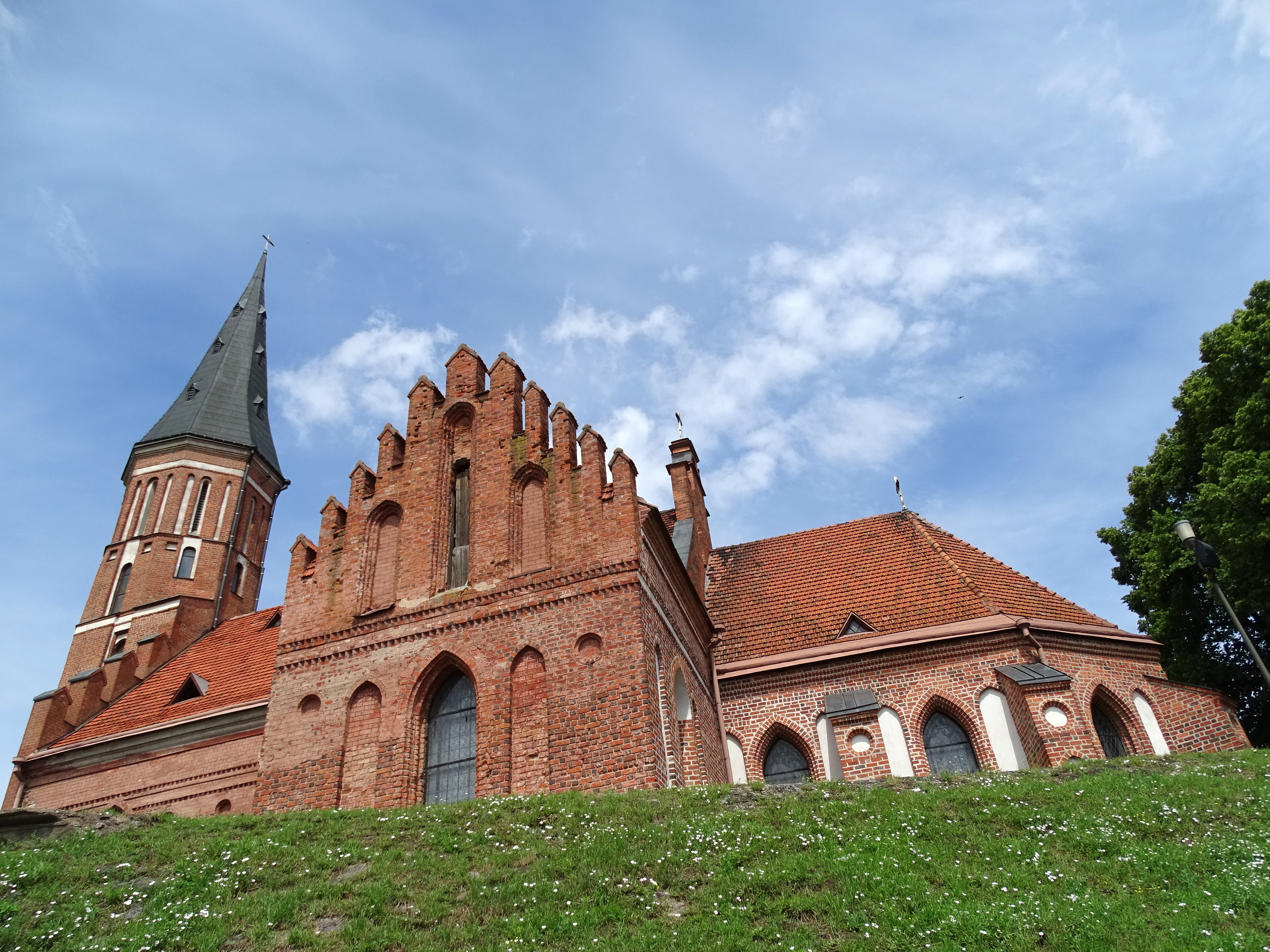
View of the church from below

The church's location on the banks of Nemunas River frequently resulted in flooding during the spring months, as evidenced by a water level inside the church exceeding 70 cm in 1829. A plaque affixed to the north wall of the tower, adjacent to the main church door, bears the inscription '24 March 1946, water level 2.90 m,' thus providing a direct record of the high water level experienced during that period

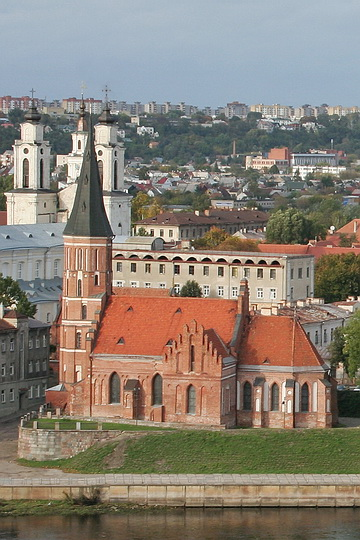
Church within the city of Kaunas

During the World War I, the Imperial German Army captured Kaunas in 1915, and the church's roof was torn off. It was then used as a warehouse, and when the Germans retreated, only the blackened and cracked walls remained standing. On 18 April 1919, the Vytautas the Great Church was returned to the Catholic faith. Since 1920, the church has been under the governance of the Rector and Canon Juozas Tumas-Vaižgantas, who undertook the project of renovating the church. On 15 August 1920, the church was consecrated by Prelate Aleksandras Jakštas-Dambrauskas and underwent major renovation works in 1931–1938, and again in 1978–1982. A marble plate dedicated to the Lithuanian Siberian Battalion, now lost, was put in the church in 1920. After the death of Tumas-Vaižgantas in 1933, he was buried in a crypt in the churchyard.

The restoration work initiated by Tumas-Vaižgantas was not completed until 1990. In 1978, under the direction of the architect Stefanija Čerškutė, work continued on the architectural survey and partial restoration of the building. Based on an image of the church in a 17th-century engraving by Tomasz Makowski, the tower spire was restored in 1982. During the restoration works, a new organ was installed and the vestibule of the sacristy was added. In 1990, the interior of the church was subject to significant changes, including the installation of a polished stone floor in the chancel and the addition of a new altar table. Unfortunately, the oldest original interiors of the church, dating back to the Gothic, Renaissance and Baroque periods, have not survived. The decor and furnishings of the current interior date from the 1920s.

On 20 September 2019, a bronze sculpture of Tumas-Vaižgantas by Gediminas Piekuras was unveiled and consecrated in the churchyard.

== Architecture ==
The church was constructed in Gothic style and is an example of the Lithuanian Brick Gothic architecture. The church layout of the Latin cross is unique in the Lithuanian Gothic. Over the years the ground level around the church has been raised significantly and the façades became lower; to compensate for this, the windows were shortened and the side portals were removed. The bell tower was added later and has probably been used to guide ships navigating the Neman River.
