= House of Perkūnas =

Building in Kaunas, Lithuania

Coordinates: 54°53′44″N 23°53′10″E

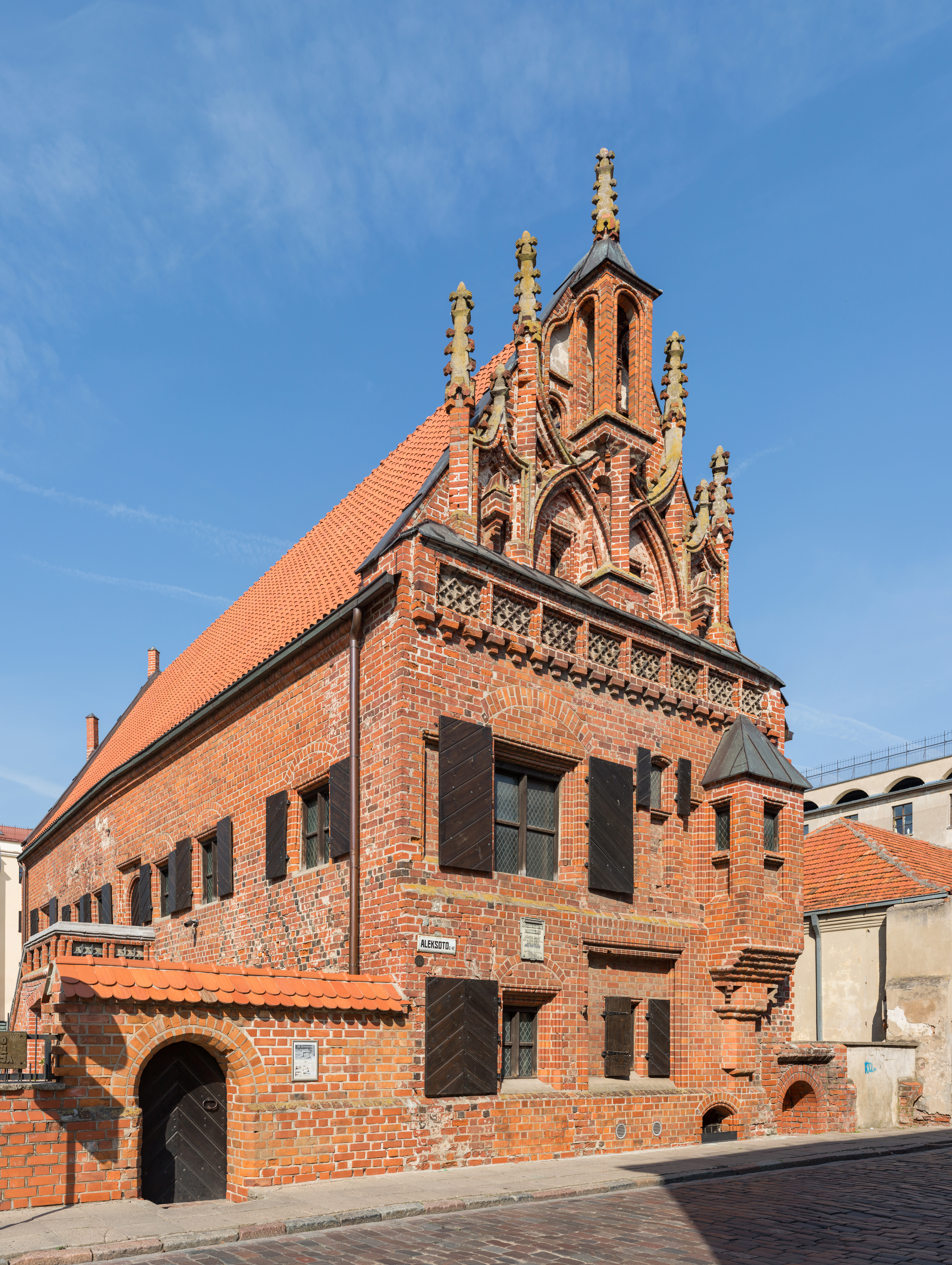
House of Perkūnas

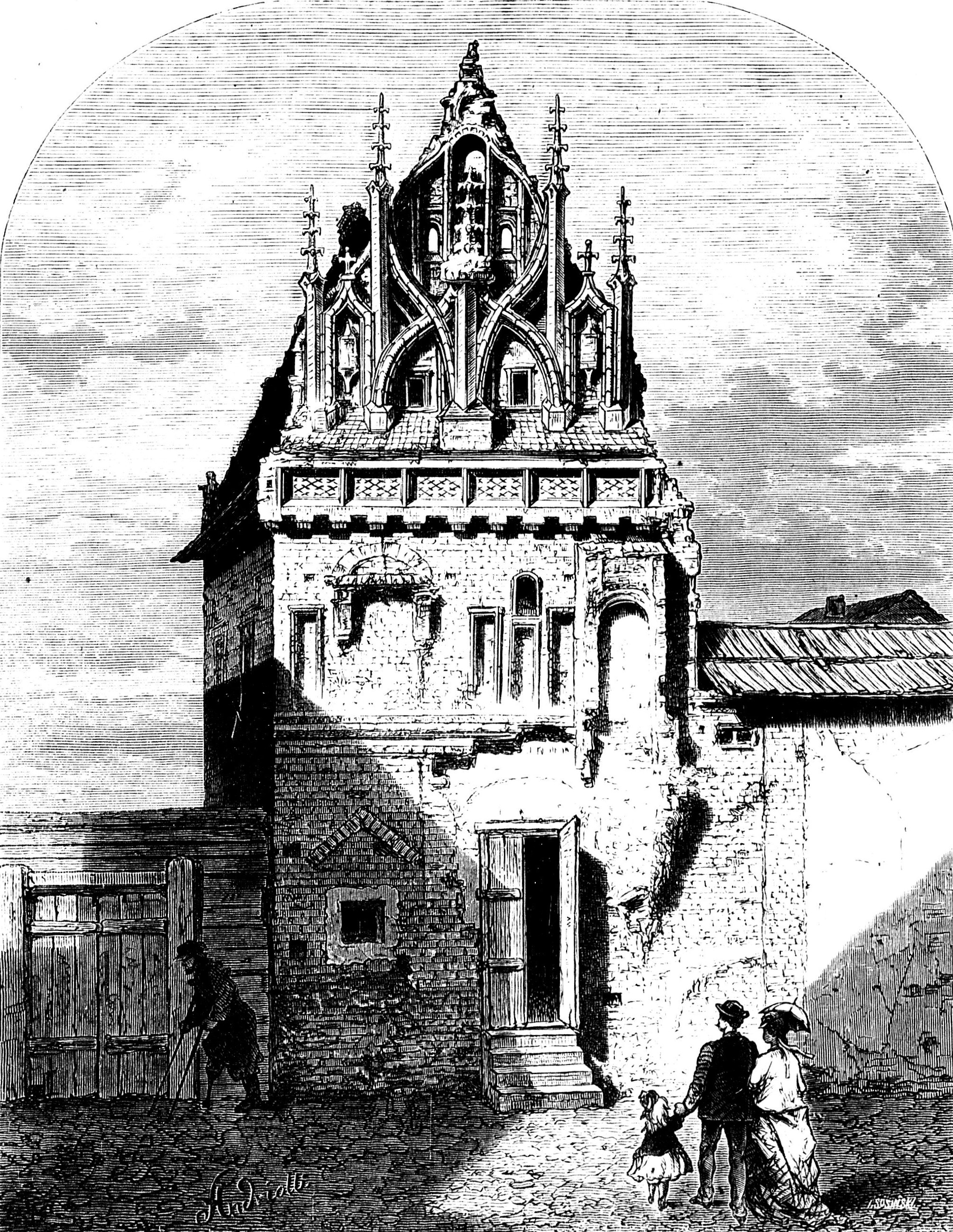
House of Perkūnas in 1895

The House of Perkūnas is one of the most original and Gothic secular buildings, located in the Old Town of Kaunas, Lithuania. Originally built by Hanseatic merchants and served as their office from 1440 until 1532, it was sold in the 16th century to the Jesuits who had established a chapel there in 1643. The Jesuits have also completed the Church of St. Francis Xavier at the Town Hall Square in 1722.

The ruined house was rebuilt in the 19th century and served as a school and theatre, which was attended by Polish poet Adam Mickiewicz. At the end of the 19th century it was renamed the "House of Perkūnas", when a figure, interpreted by the romantic historians of that time as an idol of the Baltic pagan god of thunder and the sky Perkūnas was found in one of its walls. Today, the house of Perkūnas once again belongs to the Jesuits and houses a museum of Adam Mickiewicz.

Lithuanian historian, theologian and translator Albert Wijuk Kojałowicz was born in the house.

The House of Perkūnas was included into the Registry of Immovable Cultural Heritage Sites of the Republic of Lithuania in 1996.

== See also ==
- Gothic architecture in Lithuania
- List of Jesuit sites

== Sources ==
- Szulakowska, Urszula (2018). Renaissance and Baroque Art and Culture in the Eastern Polish-Lithuanian Commonwealth (1506-1696). Cambridge Scholar Publishing. p. 324. ISBN 978-1-5275-1135-4.
