= Lithuanian Siberian Battalion =

Siberian Lithuanian Battalion of Vytautas the Great
- Vytauto Didžiojo Sibiro Lietuvių batalionas
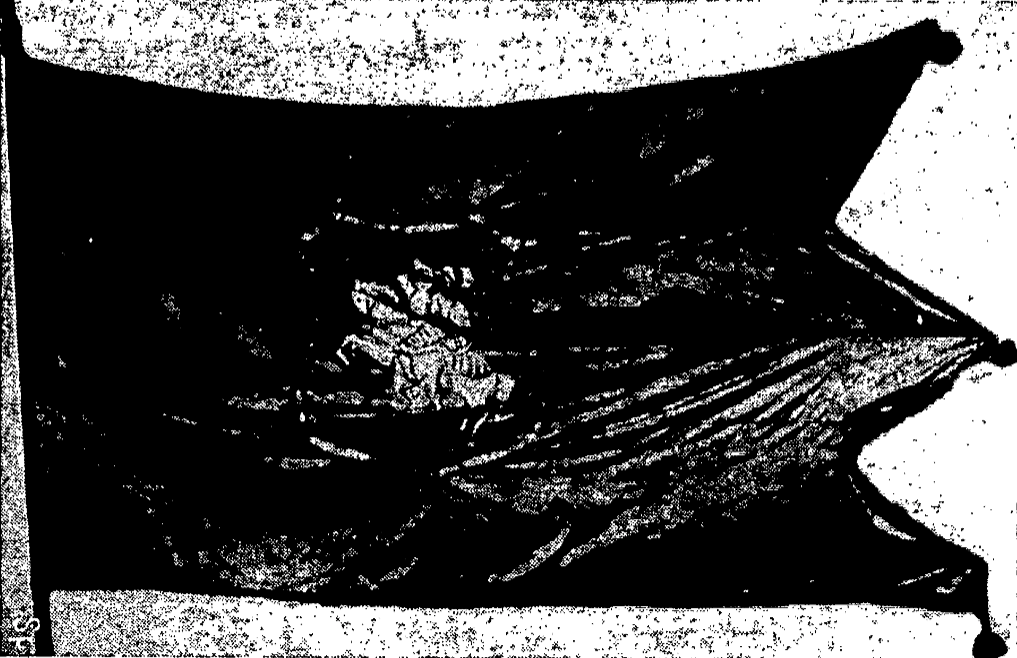
- Flag of the Lithuanian Siberian Battalion, c. 1919
- Active: August 1918 – November 1919
- Disbanded: November 24, 1919
- Country: (Russia) Russian State (1918–1920)
- Branch: Russian Army (1919)
- Type: Infantry
- Size: 13 officers, 416 NCOs and soldiers (November 1919)
- Part of: Polish 5th Siberian Rifle Division

The Lithuanian Siberian Battalion (Lithuanian: Lietuvių Sibiro batalionas) or the Siberian Lithuanian Battalion of Vytautas the Great (Lithuanian: Vytauto Didžiojo Sibiro lietuvių batalionas) was a Lithuanian military unit established in August 1918 during the Russian Civil War as the 7th Company of the 1st Polish Rifle Regiment, which later grew into the Lithuanian battalion. The unit was named after Vytautas the Great.

== Origin ==
The Lithuanian Bureau of Siberia, established in April 1918, originally addressed the Provisional Siberian Government of Omsk for them not to mobilize Lithuanian soldiers. The motion, signed by chairman V. Gačionis, secretary J. Makrickis, and second lieutenant Petras Linkevičius argued that mobilization of conscripts and veterans of Polish and Lithuanian nationality to a foreign army may result in "their extermination in the Russian army". However, the Entente (mostly France and Great Britain) ordered the creation of national units due to mistrust of the provisional government. Some Lithuanian organizations of Siberia agreed to the notion, popular amongst Lithuanian soldiers, that a central military committee should be established. However, the idea was never realized by them.

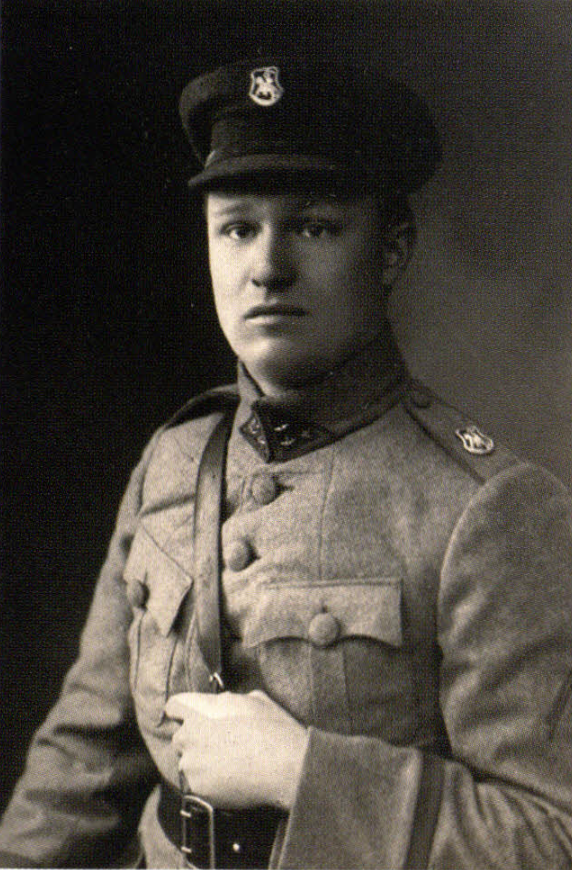
Petras Linkevičius was responsible for organizing and leading the battalion

== Formation of the 7th Company ==
In the summer of 1918, a Lithuanian committee established in Chelyabinsk accepted a resolution to create a Lithuanian military unit; it successfully negotiated support from military units of the Entente and proposed for Henryk Suchenek-Suchecki that a uniquely Lithuanian unit should be split and formed. According to the agreement, the 7th Lithuanian Company (led by Petras Linkevičius) subordinate to the 1st Polish Rifle Regiment was established on 19 August in Buguruslan. The company at first consisted of 3 officers and 116 soldiers. Soldiers of the company would wear Lithuanian-themed colors, distinguishing them from their Polish allies.

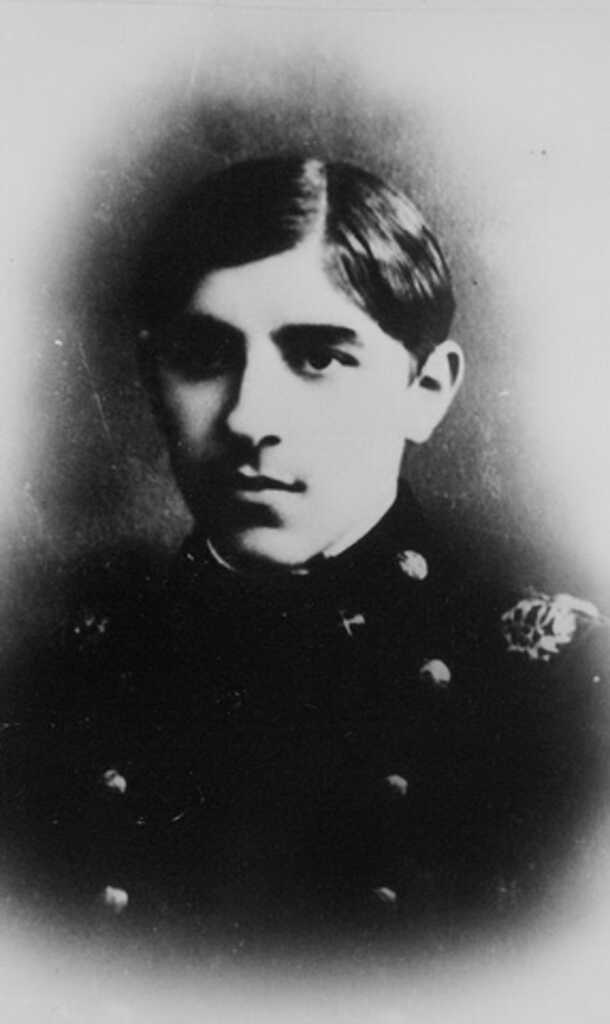
Steponas Maleris, a battalion officer that died in battle in 1918

As part of the White Army, the company fought against Bolshevik forces from August to December 1918. Occasionally, it fought independently without Polish support. On 11 November, the company fought at Verkhny Sardyk, covering retreating Polish forces. It also fought at the village of Glumilovka on 3 December, being the first to reach the strategically important city of Belebey later on the same day. On 6 December, the company fought its last battle near the Urals. In the process, 1 soldier died and 16 were wounded (two of whom were officers). The company was later deployed in Minyar and Novonikolayevsk.

In January 1919, further organization of the company was hindered by a resolution accepted by the second Siberian-Lithuanian convention in Irkutsk. The majority of the attendees voted against the formation of a Siberian-Lithuanian army. Officer Petras Linkevičius, in accordance with the resolution, began to secretly and slowly demobilize his company. To avoid mobilization, Lithuanians would explain that they were subordinate to the Polish units, or alternatively, joined the units themselves.

== Formation of the battalion ==
On 27 May 1919, Lithuanian officers received permission from the Novonikolayevsk Lithuanian National Council to form a sole Lithuanian battalion. Poruchik Petras Linkevičius was once again made responsible for its formation. At that time, it consisted of 140 soldiers and 5 officers. Three infantry companies, one machine gun and farm company, as well as communications and mounted scout teams were formed. In November 1919, around 460 soldiers were part of the battalion. It actively fought against Bolshevik partisans and guarded railways. On occasion, the battalion was educated about Lithuanian culture and military discipline.

However, after the White Army under Alexander Kolchak began to lose, Entente forces evacuated. As the military situation worsened, Bolshevik sentiment increasingly grew in the battalion. The battalion was eventually ordered to stay in the Cherepanovo station to cover retreating Entente soldiers. On 24 November 1919, a Bolshevik coup supported by the Bolshevik partisans took place. On 9 December 1919, five officers and three soldiers were shot without trial. The rest of the battalion's soldiers were forcefully included in the Red Army's 312th Infantry Regiment. Lithuanian soldiers attempted to escape the formation, with the majority of them returning to Lithuania.

In 1920, a marble commemorative plate was uncovered in the Church of Vytautas the Great.
