= Kauno Miesto Diena =

Cultural event in Kaunas, Lithuania

Coordinates: 54°53′50″N 23°52′50″E

Days of Kaunas City (Lithuanian: Kauno miesto dienos) is an annual series of cultural events to celebrate the anniversary of Kaunas, Lithuania. The festival celebrates the expanded privileges of the city granted in 1463 by Grand Duke Casimir IV Jagiellon. The festival takes place over three days at the end of May, and involves folk art fairs, concerts and other performances from professionals as well as community groups.

== History ==
The festivities mark 20 May 1463, when Grand Duke Casimir IV Jagiellon renewed and expanded the privileges of the city. The oldest original privilege is kept in Saint Petersburg archives and its copy is kept in the Town Hall of Kaunas. The main events of the festival, including folk art fairs and concerts, take place in the streets and squares of the Old Town of Kaunas at the end of May. The festival includes professionals and community group performances.

The events take place over several days (three days in 2025), and have a budget of 500,000 Euros. The event provider is selected by tender each year. In 2017–2019, that company was Medusa Concert, and the company selected in 2025, Lietuvis, had previously been responsible for the public Christmas tree display in Kaunas. A main event takes place at a stage set up in the middle of Kaunas Santaka Park Stadium. One of the events celebrates the river, and involves sailing on the Neris and Nemunas rivers, and mooring at certain places on the river banks to celebrate the culture.

The 2020 Days of Kaunas City festival was cancelled due to the restrictions necessary to control the COVID-19 pandemic.
