= Gothic architecture in Lithuania =

Lithuania is not the very centre of Gothic architecture, but it provides a number of examples, partly very different and some quite unique.

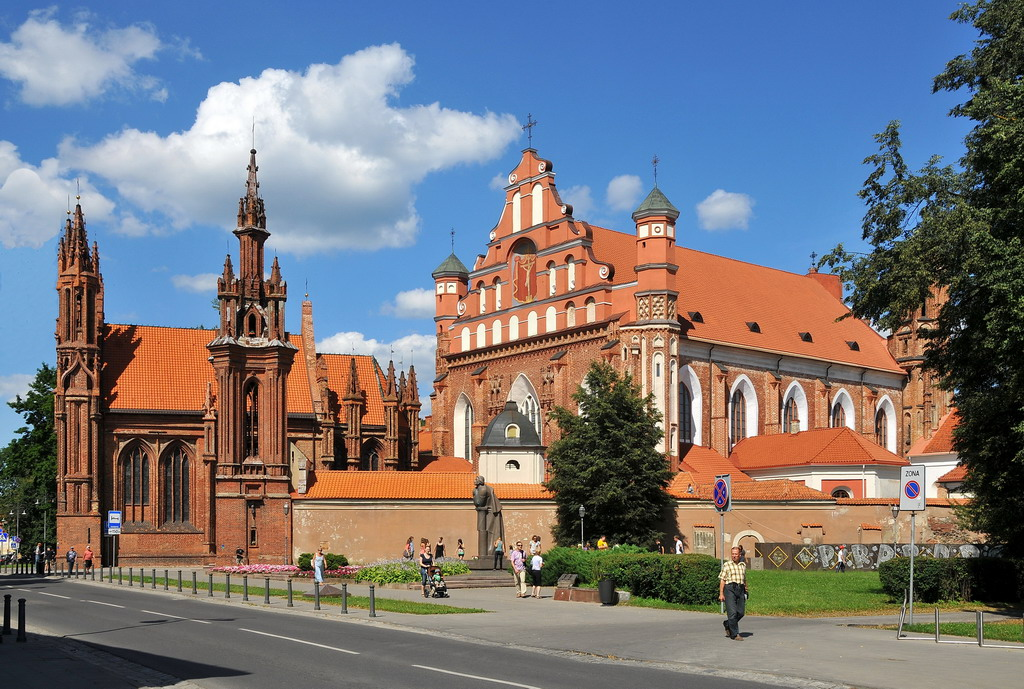
The Monastery of St. Francis and St. Anne's church in Vilnius

== Conditions ==
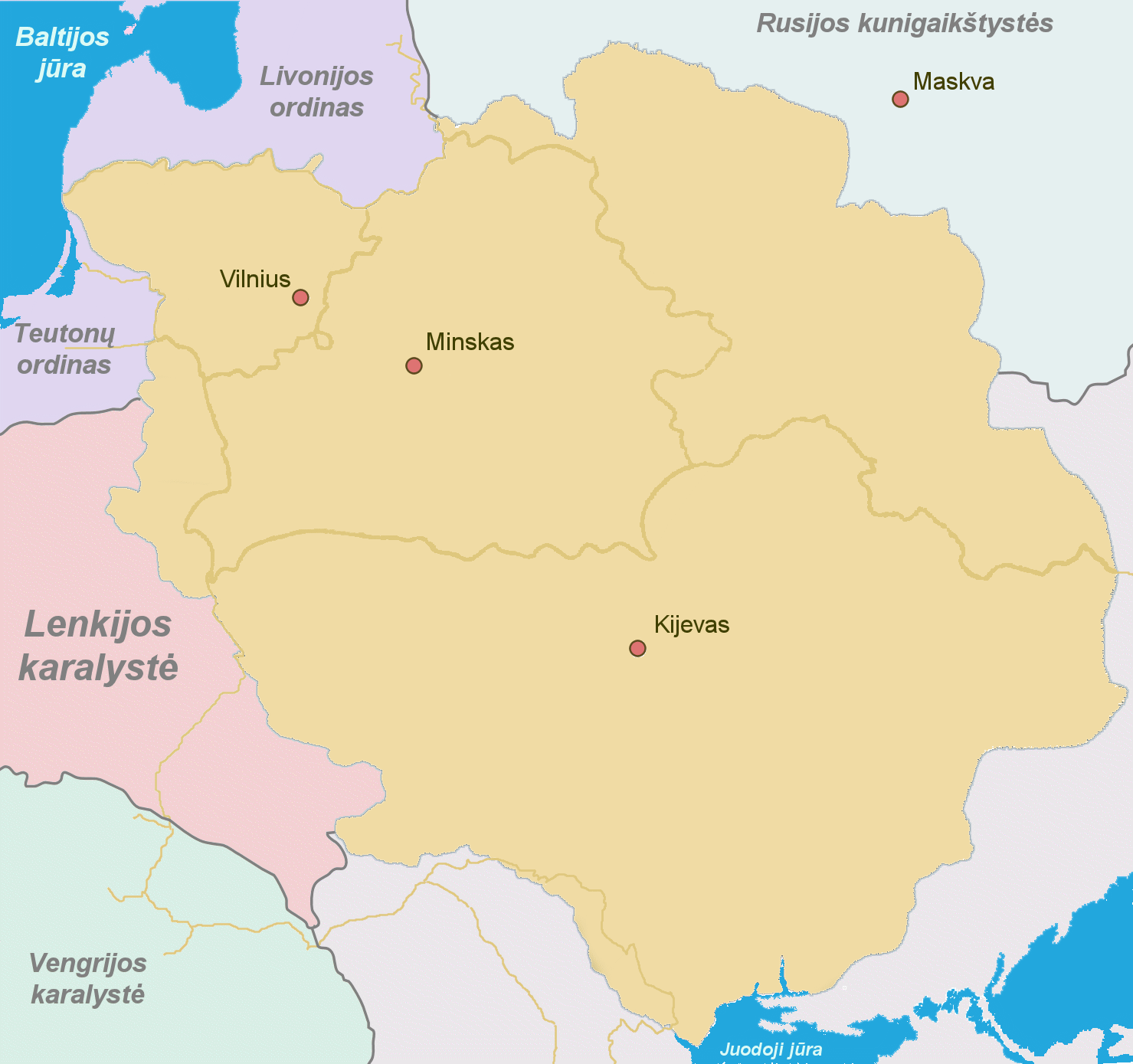
Lithuania during the reign of Vytautas the Great, with modern-day borders superimposed

Lithuania, situated at the border of Greek and Roman Church had developed by the defence of its paganism, especially against the Teutonic Order to become a state and in the 14th century a major power. The territory of nowaday's republic, except Lithuania Minor, which was ruled by the Teutonic Order, was the Lithuanian speaking part of the Grand Duchy of Lithuania, with its Slavic and Orthodox majority of subjects. The centre of power of this large state lay among Kaunas, Trakai and Vilnius.

The marriage of Grand Duke Jogaila and the Queen of Poland Jadwiga began the personal union of Lithuania and Poland. After the Battle of Grunwald in 1410 and by the Treaty of Melno in 1422 the attacks of the Teutonic Order ceased. After the Second Peace of Thorn, the Order was not any more a serious competitor in the region.

== Buildings ==
=== Castles with hard walls ===
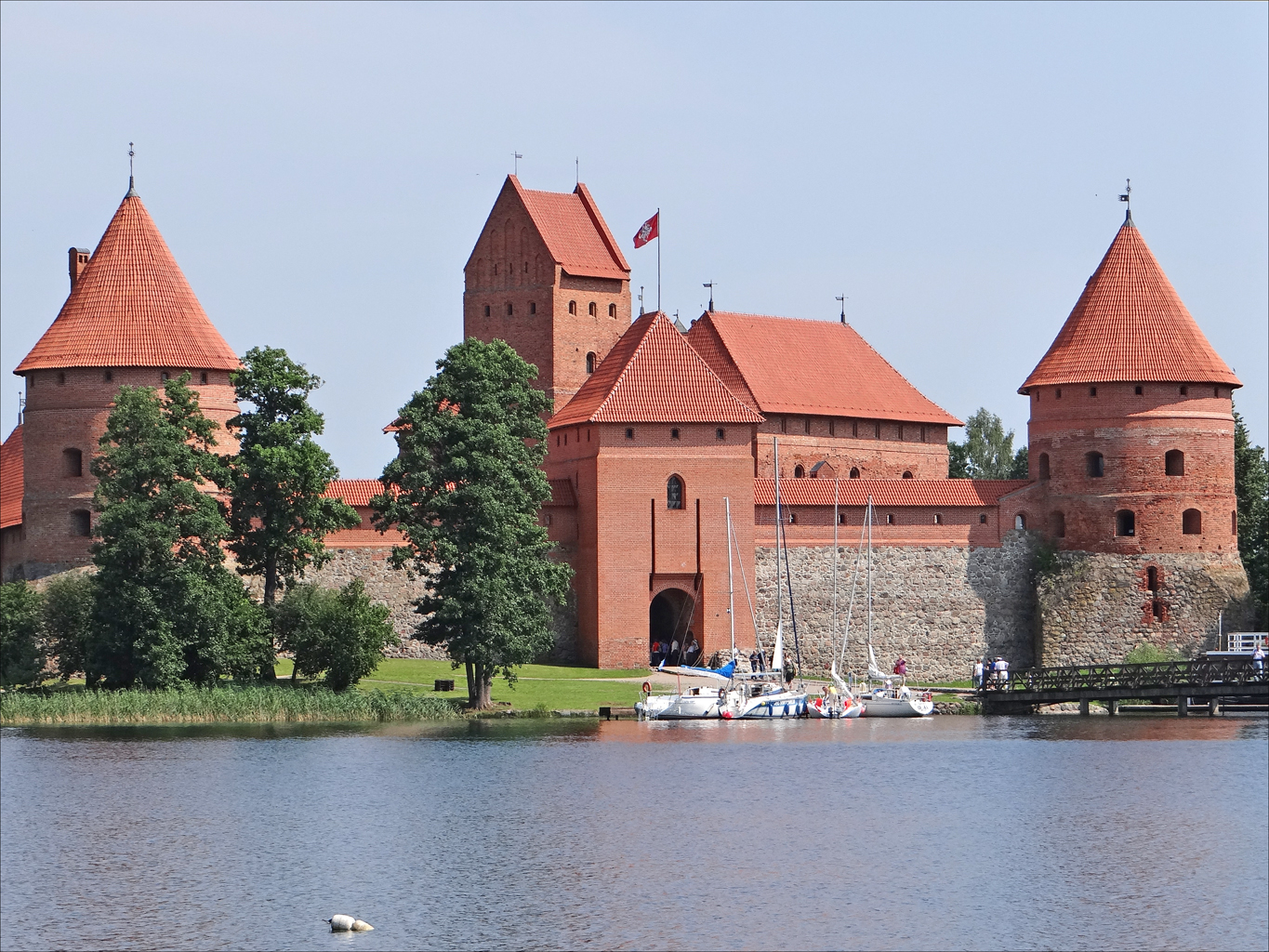
Trakai Island Castle, as rebuilt in the 1970s

Castles built of stones and bricks, dates of the first complete building after wooden precursors:

- Kaunas Castle, built in the mid 14th century, explored by Teutonic Knights in 1361 and destroyed in 1362, in 1384 once more conquered by the Order and reconquered by the Lithuanians,
- Trakai Peninsula Castle, 1350–1377,
- Trakai Island Castle, Fortifications built in the second half of the 14th century, palace after 1410,
- Medininkai Castle, 1392, after mid 15th century residential
- Gediminas' Tower in Vilnius, completed 1409.

Almost all Lithuanian medieval castles and fortifications were built of wood and earth.

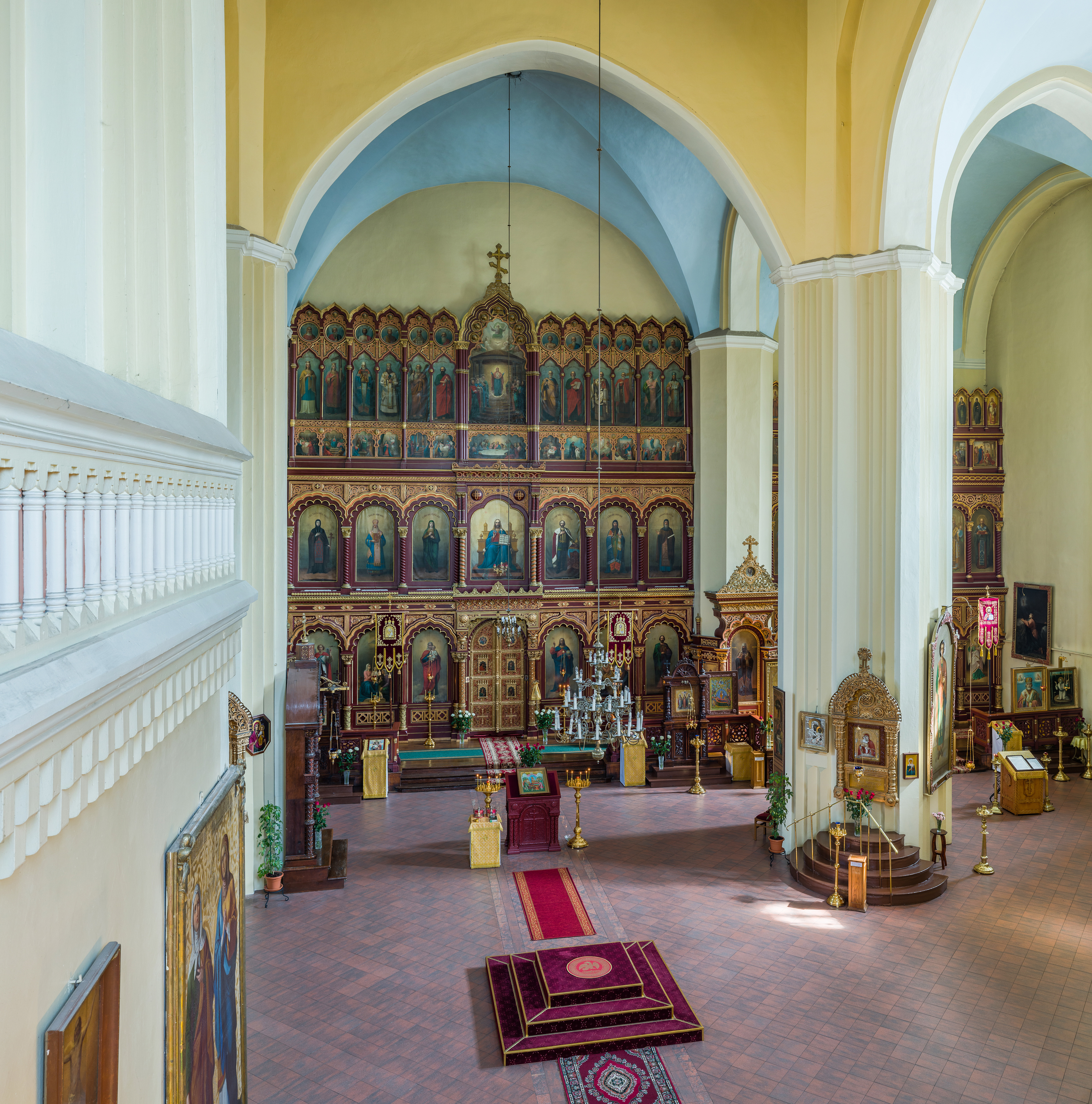
Orthodox Cathedral of the Theotokos, Vilnius

=== First churches ===
==== Orthodox cathedral of Vilnius ====
The oldest church in Lithuania, built from bricks, is the Orthodox Cathedral of the Theotokos, Vilnius. It was constructed in 1346, when the Renaissance style had not yet arrived in central Europe, and in the Grand Duchy only the Slavic population was Christian. The roofs and design of the outer walls underwent some changes during the course of centuries. Today, the outer appearance is Neo-Byzantine, and most of the walls are plastered.

==== Brick Gothic ====
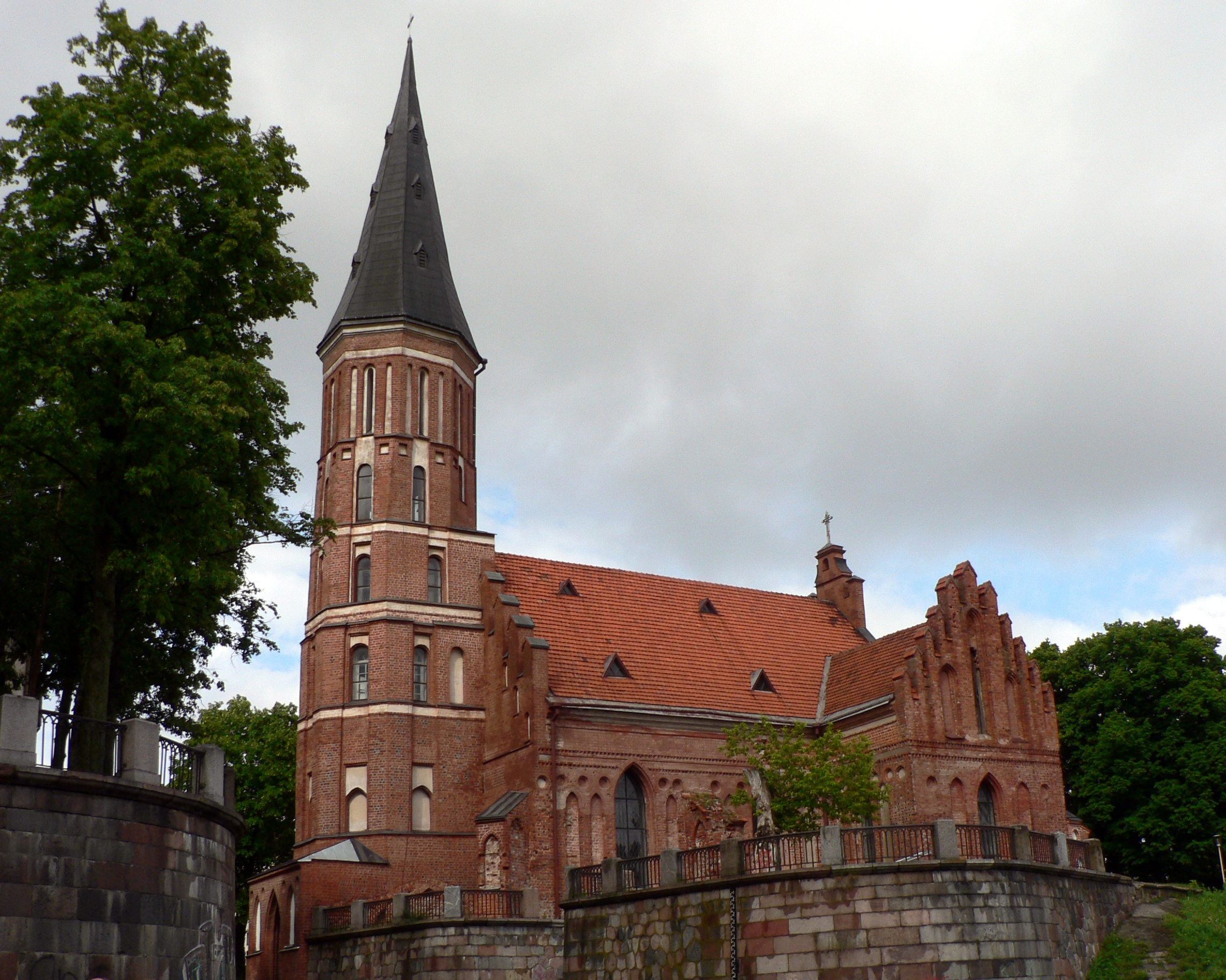
Vytautas the Great Church, Kaunas

After Jogaila had been baptized a Catholic, the country officially became Catholic, and churches were built also for the Grand Duchy's Lithuanian population. Soon the most important churches were erected in Brick Gothic:

- Saint Nicholas Church in Vilnius, 1387
- Vytautas' the Great Church in Kaunas, c. 1400
- St George's Church in Kėdainiai, 1403
- Kaunas Cathedral Basilica, 1410, rebuilt several times and redesigned in Baroque style
- Franciscan Church of the Assumption of Mary in Vilnius, after a wooden precursor of 1387 in bricks since 1410, destroyed several times by fire, since 1671–1675 mainly Baroque.

=== Late Gothic ===
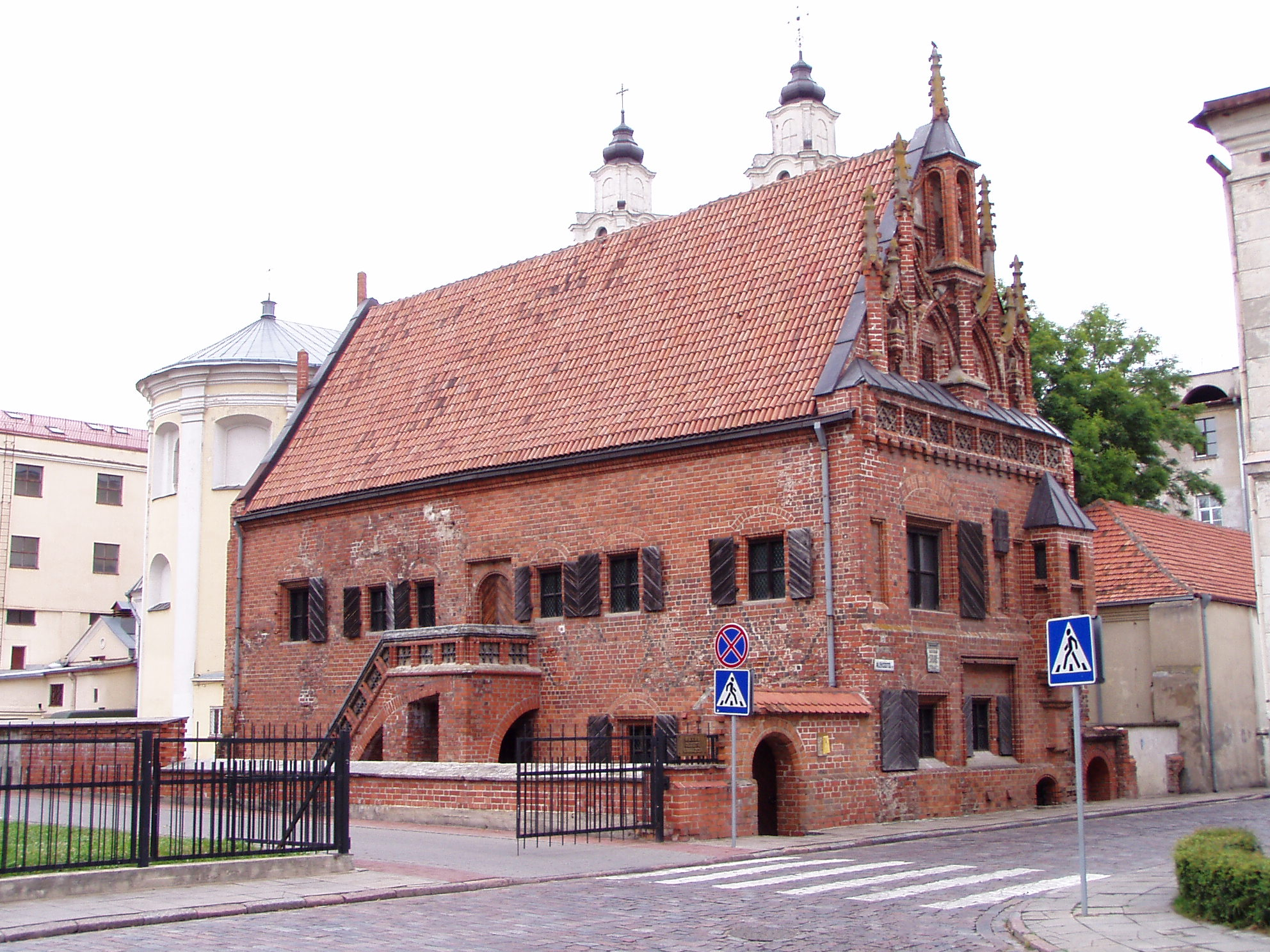
"House of Perkūnas", Kaunas

==== Flamboyant style ====
In the late Gothic period, two exceptional buildings were built in Lithuania, following the abundant French Flamboyant style, but realized in bricks.

- The House of Perkūnas was built in the mid 15th century as a trading post of the Hanseatic League and had that function till 1532. Afterwards it was used by the Society of Jesus. The present name is derived from a small picture that was found at the wall and was considered an image of a Baltic thunder god by romantic historians.
- Church of St. Anne, Vilnius, 1495 - 1500.
