= Verkhny Sardyk =

Verkhny Sardyk Верхний Сардык
- Selo
- Location within Bashkortostan Location within Russia
- Coordinates: 54°38′N 53°57′E
- Country: Russia
- Region: Bashkortostan
- District: Tuymazinsky District
- Time zone: UTC+5:00

Verkhny Sardyk (Russian: Верхний Сардык; Bashkir: Үрге Сәрҙек, Ürge Särźek) is a rural locality (a selo) in Tatar-Ulkanovsky Selsoviet, Tuymazinsky District, Bashkortostan, Russia. The population was 406 as of 2010. There are 11 streets.

== Geography ==
Verkhny Sardyk is located 26 km northeast of Tuymazy (the district's administrative centre) by road. Nizhny Sardyk is the nearest rural locality.
