= Albert Wijuk Kojałowicz =

Lithuanian historian, theologian, and translator

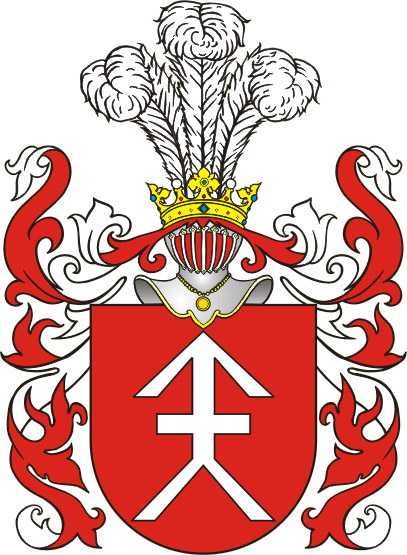
Kościesza coat of arms

Albert Wijuk Kojałowicz (also Wojciech Wijuk Kojałowicz, Lithuanian: Albertas Kojelavičius-Vijūkas, Vaitiekus Vijūkas-Kojalavičius; Latin: Albertus Koialovicius-Wijuk; 1609–1677) was a Lithuanian historian, theologian and translator. He was a devoted Jesuit and religious polemicist, interested in genealogy and heraldry. He served as a censor, bishops advisor and Deputy Chancellor of Lithuania.

== Biography ==
Albert and his brother Casimir (Kazimieras Kojelavičius-Vijūkas) were born in the House of Perkūnas in Kaunas (or Romainiai according to other sources) to a poor Lithuanian noble family. They bore Kościesza coat of arms, but without a cross-bar. He studied rhetoric, philosophy and theology in which mastered title of doctor in 1645. Later he was appointed as a professor of Alma Academia et Universitas Vilnensis Societatis Iesu, teacher of logic, physics, metaphysics and ethic. Together with his brothers he joined Jesuit order and founded its colleges in Kaunas, Vilnius and Polatsk. In 1653 he became rector of Vilnius Academy. He died on 6 October 1677 in Vilnius.

Wijuk Kojałowicz was famous for his rhetoric talent and research in the Lithuanian history. He is considered one of the best and most productive historical writers of the 17th century. Among his forty publications most important is "Historiae Lituanae", which was the first full research on the history of Lithuania.

== History of Lithuania ==
Wijuk Kojałowicz was devoted to the Lithuanian history and his "Historiae Lituanae" is considered, next to Maciej Stryjkowski's "Kronika Polska, Litewska, Żmódzka" and Alexander Guagnini's "Sarmatiae Europaeae Descriptio", as one of the most important studies of history of Lithuania from the mid-seventeenth century. It was used as main source for Lithuanian history until the 19th century.

The study continued the tradition of Lithuanian Chronicles by glorifying the heroic past of the Grand Duchy of Lithuania, by voicing the patriotic sentiments and by encouraging Lithuanian nobles to protect the territorial integrity of their fatherland.

Wijuk-Kojałowicz also focused on the imperfection of human memory. Memory is, according to him, a defective instrument, with time it tends to remember incorrectly, incompletely, or not at all. The technology of human memory, in Wijuk-Kojałowicz's view, is always uncertain and doubtful, even the written testimony is bound to mutate and to be distorted. Kojałowicz's implied that the goal of history is nothing else but to preserve memory of all things past. The communal or collective memory is firmest when it is written down:

But all this will be recounted better and more comprehensively for the future generations by the history of the times past, I will only touch upon them in order to show for the future that I was able to publish my history of Lithuania only with the support of Your Grace. There is no doubt that the person who is a celebrated defender of the Lithuanian state must also be a patron of a history of Lithuania..."

In the foreword of the first volume of this work entitled "An opportunity to write the history of Lithuania", he admitted that he had not just translated Stryjkowski's history but had revised it "according to the requirements and laws of a written treatise...". According to Wijuk-Kojałowicz, Stryjkowski's history, that was written in Polish was not accessible to foreign readers, and it also broke rhetorics and history principles in many places. Because of his critical stance towards Stryjkowski's "Kronika..." Wijuk-Kojałowicz revised it so, that it would teach the young not only the history of their country, but also the Latin language. His goal, as he admitted himself, was to rewrite Stryjkowski's history in Latin according to the rhetoric principles and historical truth. Kojałowicz's history moved away from metaphorical representation favored by Stryjkowski toward a more balanced description. He replaced Stryjkowski's metaphorical style of historical writing preoccupied with analogy and thereby closer to poetry with a rhetoric focused on the mechanics of telling a linear story.

Despite his critical attitude, Wijuk-Kojałowicz's History of Lithuania reiterated Stryjkowski's chronological and factual errors. As in "Kronika...", the death dates of the Lithuanian Grand Dukes Algirdas and Gediminas were incorrect, and the names of Algirdas's sons and uncles were mixed up. The change of places and names, confused in the course of many centuries, sometimes obscured the truth so that it became impossible to distinguish between truth and the fiction for the states were formed during barbarian times when there were no writers. Because of such reasons there remained very few stories about the origins and customs of the Lithuanians, and thus many widespread stories are questionable or false. Kojałowicz was skeptical about the possibility of history written sine ira et studio, without anger and without preconception, without affection and hatred.

Wijuk-Kojałowicz described the Polish–Lithuanian Commonwealth as a state consisting of two states, the Kingdom of Poland and the Grand Duchy of Lithuania, and two nations, the Lithuanian and Polish, which were supposed to have equal rights. He extensively described the Union of Lublin which was, in his opinion, a significant event in the history of the Grand Duchy. The Lithuanian nobles were convinced that they needed this union but its conditions had to guarantee and preserve the dignity of the Lithuanian state and Lithuanian nation:

Beyond doubt they wanted the union, but they expected it not to violate the dignity of the state, not to change offices and courts, laws and privileges, customs and finally the borders of the Grand Duchy of Lithuania.

In his history, Wijuk-Kojałowicz did not fail to record the continuous rivalry between the Lithuanians and Poles for their rights and privileges and their constant distrust of each other.

Wijuk-Kojałowicz regarded the religion as the most important attribute of national belonging. According to him, neither ethnicity nor language distinguished Lithuanians from Ruthenians but their different creed. Roman Christianity became a definitive composite of a noble's identity. Wijuk-Kojałowicz wrote that:

A sovereign must appoint to high offices, posts and public duties only a person of the Roman creed, infidels and even some Christians who refuse to be subject to the authority of the Roman Pope must be excluded. Privileges of the whole noble estate must not be applied to those who do not recognize the Catholic religion and do not obey the Pope.

In Kojałowicz's works, the nation was, first of all, imagined as a community with common interests and a shared past. His ideas about the historical nation were not only a reflection of cultural forces in the state, they were instrumental in forging popular imagination of the historical community of the Grand Duchy. The word "nation" (natio), which he often used, was expressed as a problematic ambivalence in imagining and fictionalizing the community of Lithuania.

== Bibliography ==
- "Colloquia Theologi cum Politico de electione prudenti unios verae Christianae religionis, sub nomine sui discipuli" Vilnius 1640
- "Primum Societatis Jesu annum secularem Vilnae solennibus feriis celebratum" Vilnius 1640
- "Compendium Ethicae Aristotelicae" Vilnius 1645
- "Oculus ratione correctus, sux refutatio demonstrations ocularis de Vacuo" Vilnius 1648
- "Decem modi colendi Beatissimam Virginem in ejus imagine Lauretana" Vilnius 1648
- "De vita et morbius P. Laurentii Bartlii S. J." Vilnius 1648
- "Miscellanea rerum ad statum ecclesiasticum in Magno Lithuaniae Ducatu pertinentia" (Synthesis of history and contemporaneity of Christianity in Lithuania) Vilnius 1650
- "Historiae Lituanae" (History of Lithuania) (dedicated to the Sapieha family)
  - vol.1 "Historiae Lithuanae pars prior, de rebus Lithuanorum ante susceptam Christianam religionem conjunctionemque... cum regno Poloniae" 1650 Gdańsk
  - vol.2 "Historiae Lithuanae pars altera a conjunctione cum Regno Poloniae ad unionem corum Dominiorum libri octo" 1669 Antwerp
- "De rebus gestis anno 1648 et sequenti contra Cosacos Zaporovios rebelles" Vilnius 1651
- "Instructio circa casus reservatos ad usum cleri Dioecisis Vilnensis" Vilnius 1651
- "Fasti Radziviliani compendio continentes gesta Ducum Radziwił" Vilnius 1653, (sponsored and dedicated to Janusz Radziwiłł)
- "Colloquia Theologi cum Ministro, de dissidiis in rebus fidei inter Catholicos et Calvinistas" "O niektorych roznicach wiary, ktore między katholikami y ewangelikami zachodza : theologa z ministrem rozmowy ku przestrodze tak katholikow iako y ewengelikow" (About some differences in faith, which are between Catholics and evangelist: theologian with minister conversation to aware as Catholics as well as evangelists) Vilnius 1653
- "Instructionum Rhetoricarum partes duae" Vilnius 1654
- "Rerum in M. D. Lithuaniae per tempus rebellionis Russicae gestarum commentarius etc.", 1655
- "Compendium Vitae Alphonsi Rodriquez Soc. Jesu ex Hispanico" Vilnius 1656
- "Colloquia Theologi cum Dissidente in Religione, de sincero, et non adulterato usu Sacrae Scripturae ad probandos artieulos fidei" Kalisz 1667
- "Modi Sexaginta Sacrae Oratonis Varie formandae" Antwerp 1668
- "Panegyrici Heroum, varia antahac manu sparsi, in anum collecti" Vilnius 1668
- "Soli polique decus Sagittae Wołowicianae Ladislao Wołowicz Palatino Witebski" Vilnius 1669
- "Kazania o męce Pańskiej, opus posthumum" Vilnius 1675
- "Herbarz Rycerstwa W.X. Litewskiego tak zwany COMPENDIUM O Klejnotach albo Herbach ktorych Familie Stanu Rycerskiego W Prowincyach Wielkiego Xiestwa Litweskiego Zazywaja" (An Armorial of the Knighthood of the Grand Duchy of Lithuania which is called COMPENDIUM, in which the Coats of Arms or Heraldry of the Noble Families of the Grand Duchy of Lithuania are Explored), Kraków 1897.
- "Herbarz szlachty Wielkiego Ksiestwa Litewskiego zwany NOMENCLATOR" (An Armorial of the Nobility of the Grand Duchy of Lithuania which is called NOMENCLATOR), Kraków 1905.
