= Town Hall, Kaunas =

Town Hall of Kaunas
- Kauno rotušė (Lithuanian)
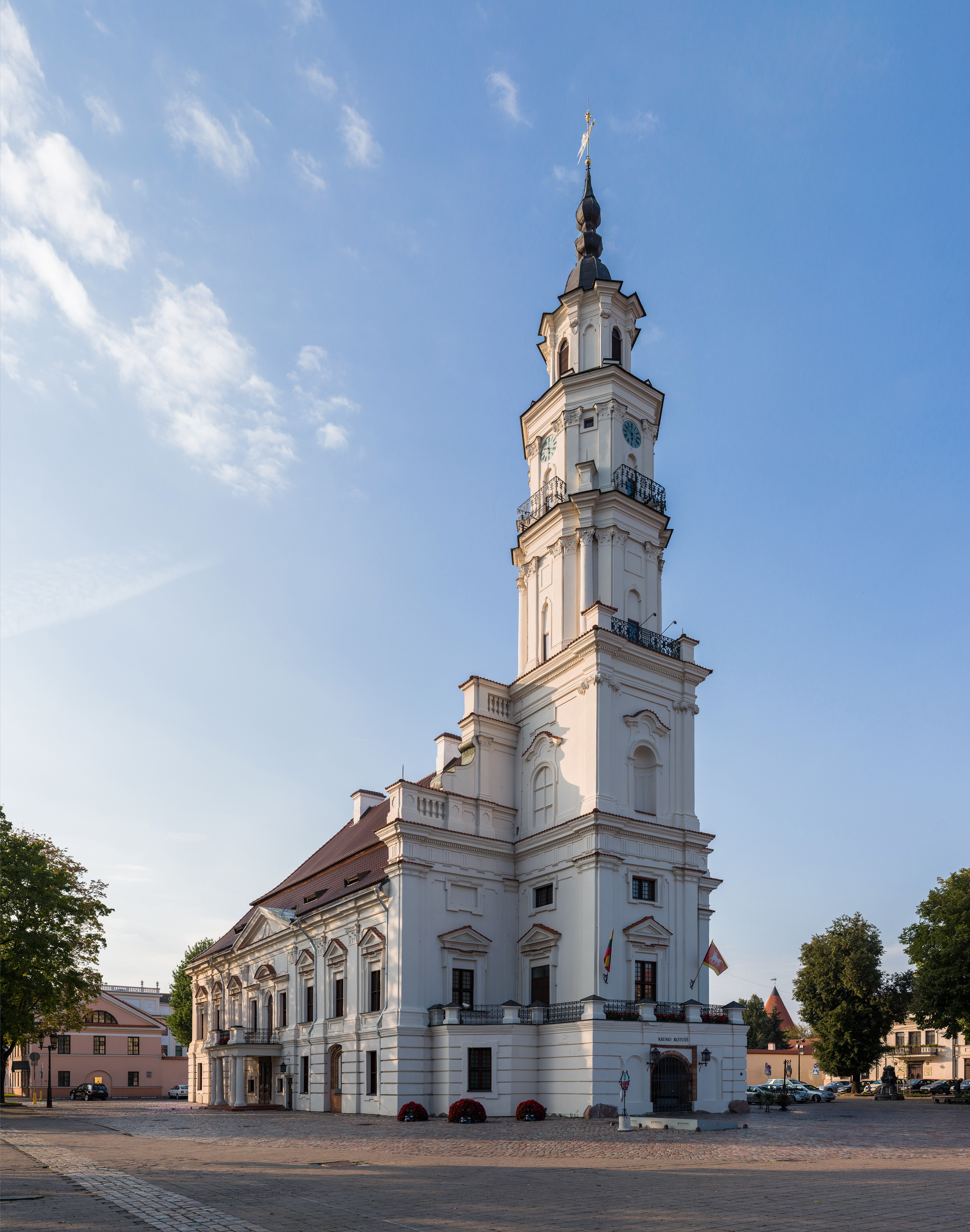
- Main and southern façade seen from Rotušės Square

- Location within Lithuania
- 54°53′48″N 23°53′08″E
- Location: Rotušės a. 15, LT-44279 Kaunas

History
- Built: 1542
- Rebuilt: 17th century and 18th century

Site notes
- Architectural styles: Baroque and Classical Revival
- Governing body: Kaunas City Museum
- Website: kaunomuziejus.lt

Cultural Monuments of Lithuania
- Type: National
- Designated: 3 October 2003
- Reference no.: 1029

The Town Hall of Kaunas (Lithuanian: Kauno rotušė) is the former Town hall of the Kaunas city government. Today, the building houses a branch of Kaunas City Museum and a wedding hall. Town hall stands in the middle of the Rotušės Square at the heart of the Old Town, Kaunas, Lithuania. The structure dates from the 16th century and reflects the architecture of the Polish–Lithuanian Commonwealth.

== History ==
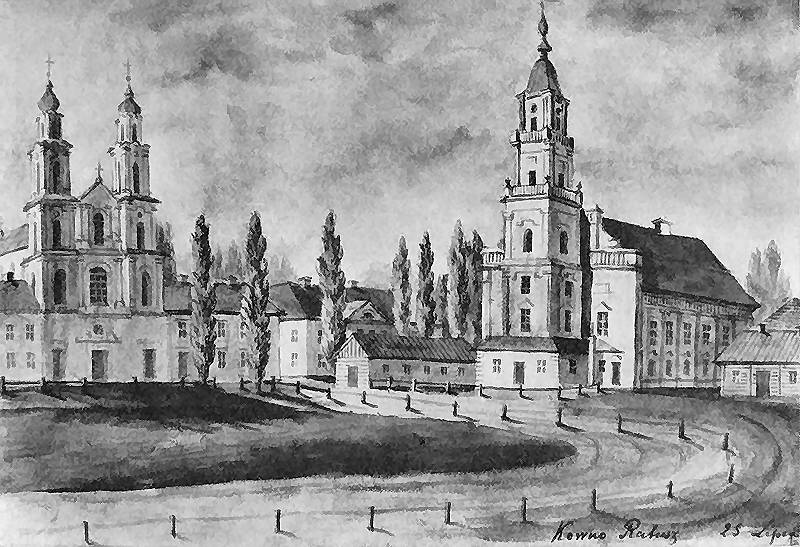
The Town Hall (19th century, Napoleon Orda)

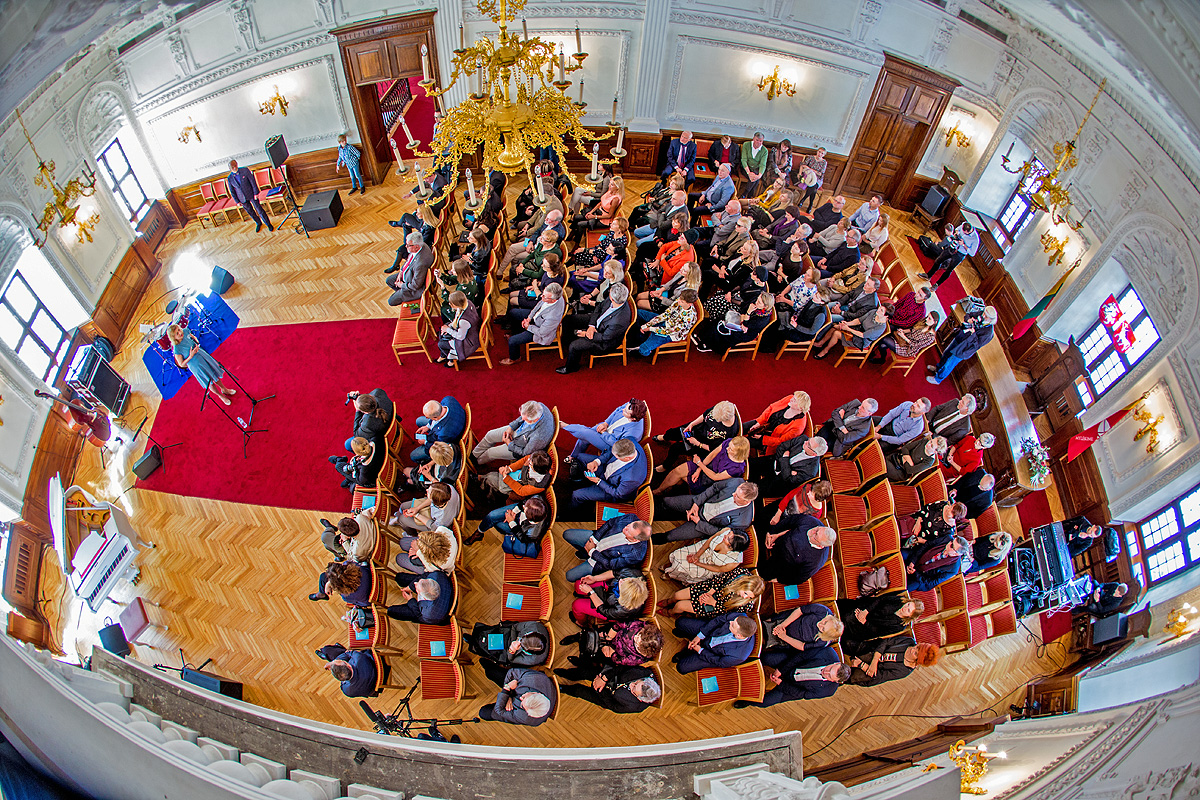
Interior (2018)

The Town Hall is distinguished by its slenderness and grace. Its tower of height of 53 meters is the highest in the old city. Present Town Hall located in the square was not the first in Kaunas. The previous one was destroyed by the fire.

The construction of Kaunas town hall started in 1542. At first it was a one-storey building with not daubed facade and vaulting cellars. In the 16th century the first floor was built and the eight storey tower was built in the east of the building. The ground floor was adjusted for trading and prison guards, the first floor - for trial, magistrate, treasure, archive and office. Cellars were used to store the goods. The cellars of the tower were used as a prison.

In the year 1638 the renaissance reconstruction was made. In the year 1771 -1775 the second reconstruction was made by architect Jan Mattekier. He rebuilt the part of building, which was demolished in the 17th century, replanned the premises and added additional floor to the tower. He decorated the town hall with baroque and classicism style decorations, rebuilt the pediment and erected there the sculptures of Grand Dukes of Lithuania (they survived only until the 19th century).

In the year 1824 the town hall was used as the premises of the orthodox church and later - ammunition storage.

In the year 1836 the town hall was reconstructed again. The residence for Russian tsars was made there.

From the year 1862 and 1869 there was The Kaunas town club, Russian club, firemen office and Russian theatre.

In the year 1869 Kaunas municipality was established in the Town hall. In the year 1944 it was replaced by the archive and in the year 1951 the archive was replaced by Kaunas technical institute.

In 1973 the Wedding Hall (marriage registration office) was opened in the ground and first floor of Town hall. The cellars were used by a Ceramics museum. The same year reconstruction damaged the building a lot.

In the year 2005 the last reconstruction was made, some of damage was eliminated and the Town hall was painted this time not with white color, but with ivory.

Kaunas Town hall is called "The white swan". Today it is used for the wedding ceremonies, official welcome of city guests, signing of agreements and official events. It features a historical museum of the city mayor, and stores the most important attributes of the city used in ceremonies – a great city key, a mayor’s mark (a gilded chain), samples of the city’s coats of arms and flags, a ceremonial master’s sign and a traditional bell, and the historic flag of the temporary capital city of 1930. The city’s guest book is stored in the Town Hall, and currently has over 350 entries, among them greetings by four kings and queens, three dukes, twelve presidents, Pope John Paul II, cardinals, mayors of other European cities and other famous people.

In 2018, historical Lithuanian symbol Columns of Gediminas, dating to the 17th century, were uncovered and restored on one of the town hall's walls.
