= List of hospitals in Lithuania =

Here is a list of hospitals in Lithuania.

- Jonava Hospital - Jonava
- Kėdainiai Hospital - Kėdainiai
- Tauragė Hospital - Tauragė
- Raseiniai Hospital - Raseiniai
- Druskininkai Hospital - Druskininkai
- Vilkaviškis Hospital - Vilkaviškis
- Marijampolė Hospital - Marijampolė
- Prienai Hospital - Prienai
- Visaginas Hospital - Visaginas
- Panevėžys Hospital - Panevėžys
- Šiauliai Hospital - Šiauliai
- Rokiškis Psychiatric Hospital - Rokiškis
- Rokiškis District Hospital - Rokiškis
- Klaipėda Sailor's Hospital - Klaipėda
- Republican Hospital of Klaipėda - Klaipėda
- Klaipėda University Hospital - Klaipėda
- Hospital of Lithuanian University of Health Sciences Kaunas Clinics - Kaunas
- Kaunas Hospital of the Lithuanian University of Health Science - Kaunas
- Kazys Grinius Hospital - Kaunas
- Vilnius University Children's Hospital- Vilnius
- Vilnius University Hospital Santaros Klinikos - Vilnius
- Republican Vilnius Psychiatric Hospital - Vilnius
- Republican Vilnius University Hospital - Vilnius
- Vilkpėdė Hospital - Vilnius
- Vilnius City Clinical Hospital - Vilnius
- Vilnius City Mental Health Center - Vilnius
- St. Roch's Hospital - Vilnius
- Kardiolita - Vilnius
