= Museum of the History of Lithuanian Medicine and Pharmacy =

Museum in Kaunas, Lithuania

- Lietuvos medicinos ir farmacijos istorijos muziejus

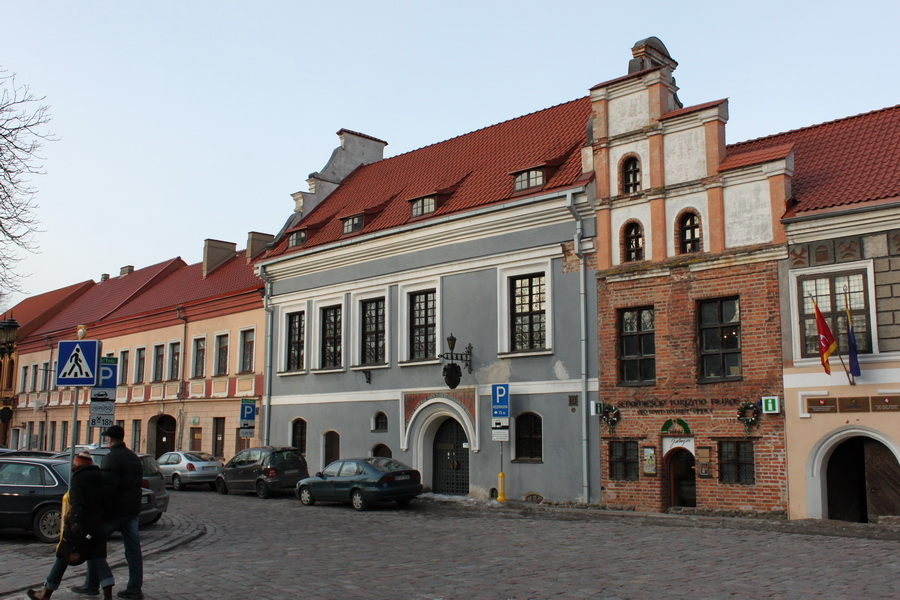
- Museum building, in Rotušės Square, Kaunas
- Interactive fullscreen map
- Former name: Lithuanian Museum of the History of Pharmacy and Institute
- Established: 1975; 51 years ago
- Location: Kaunas, Lithuania
- Coordinates: 54°53′50″N 23°53′15″E
- Type: Medical museum
- Collection size: 28 600
- Founders: Habil. dr. Alfonsas Kaikaris and Habil. dr. Eduardas Tarasevičius
- Director: Tauras Antanas Mekas
- Owner: Lithuanian University of Health Sciences
- Website: www.lndm.lt

The Museum of the History of Lithuanian Medicine and Pharmacy (Lithuanian: Lietuvos medicinos ir farmacijos istorijos muziejus) is a medical and pharmacy history museum located in a restored 16th-century building at the Town Hall Square in the Old Town of Kaunas, Lithuania. The Museum functions as a department of the Lithuanian University of Health Sciences, with a remit encompassing the collection, protection, display, scientific research and popularisation of museum values. The museum also organises lectures and practical classes for university students.

It moved to its current location in 1987, although its history dates to 1936. Alfonsas Kaikaris (1922–1997), a professor of pharmacy, is credited as the founder of the museum; his personal collection formed the basis of its holdings. The Lithuanian Pharmacists' Union worked to collect materials as well. It is sponsored by Kaunas University of Medicine.

The museum's permanent collection consists of the belongings of Lithuanian doctors, pharmacists and hospitals, along with medical and pharmaceutical implements and documents. Temporary exhibitions commemorate prominent doctors' and pharmacists' anniversaries. The exhibits include dental equipment along with displays of archaic medications such as Erektosan (a herbal version of Viagra), love potions, Venus Hair Potion, and Caput Mortuum (a medieval male vitality booster and epilepsy treatment composed of dead heads).

== Exhibits ==
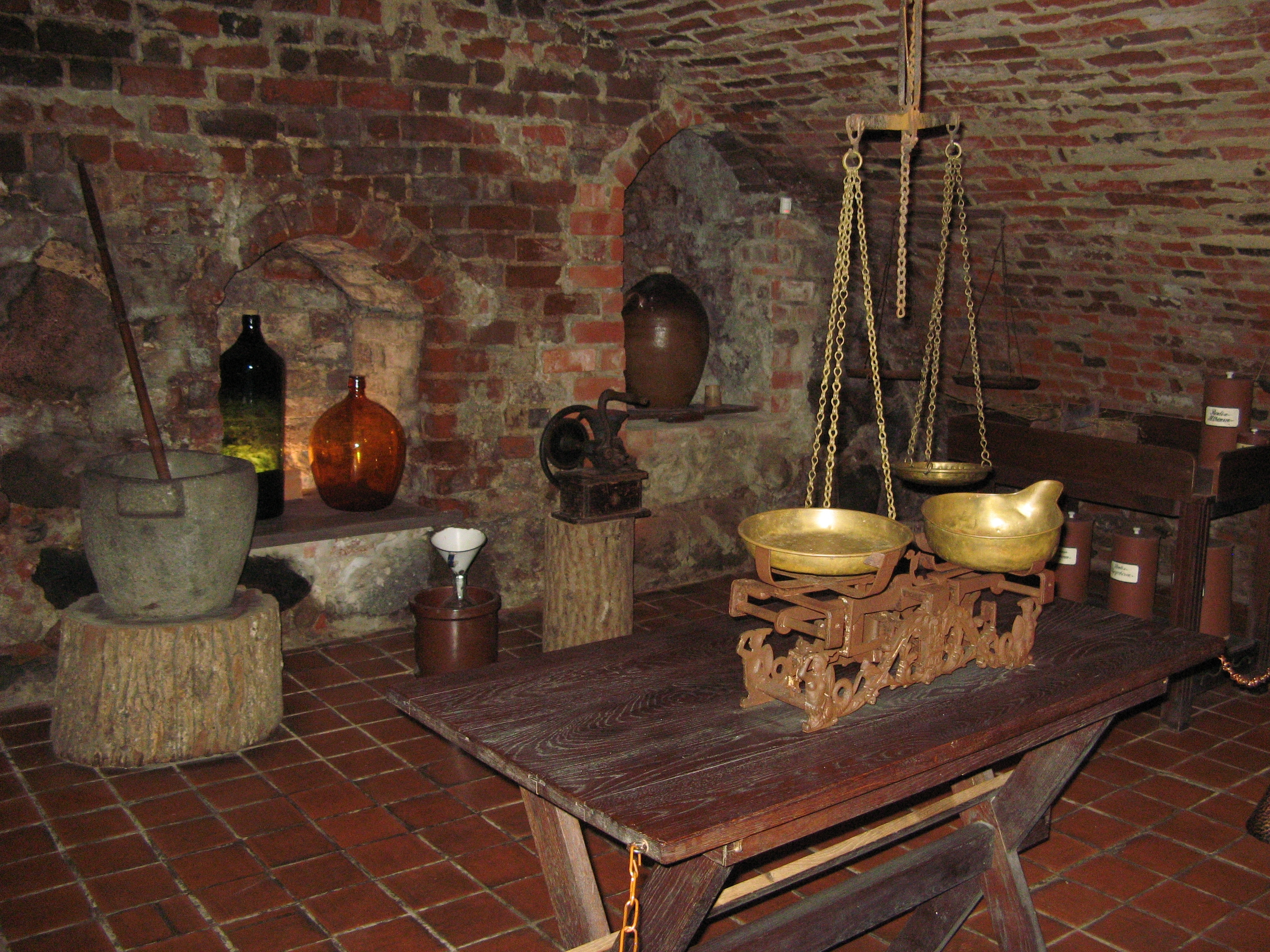
Museum interior

The museum's expositions depict a late 19th-century Lithuanian town pharmacy with an exposition of traditional medicine and pharmacy. The museum consists of an officina (prescription room), a Koktorija, a "Material" room, a laboratory, and a basement.

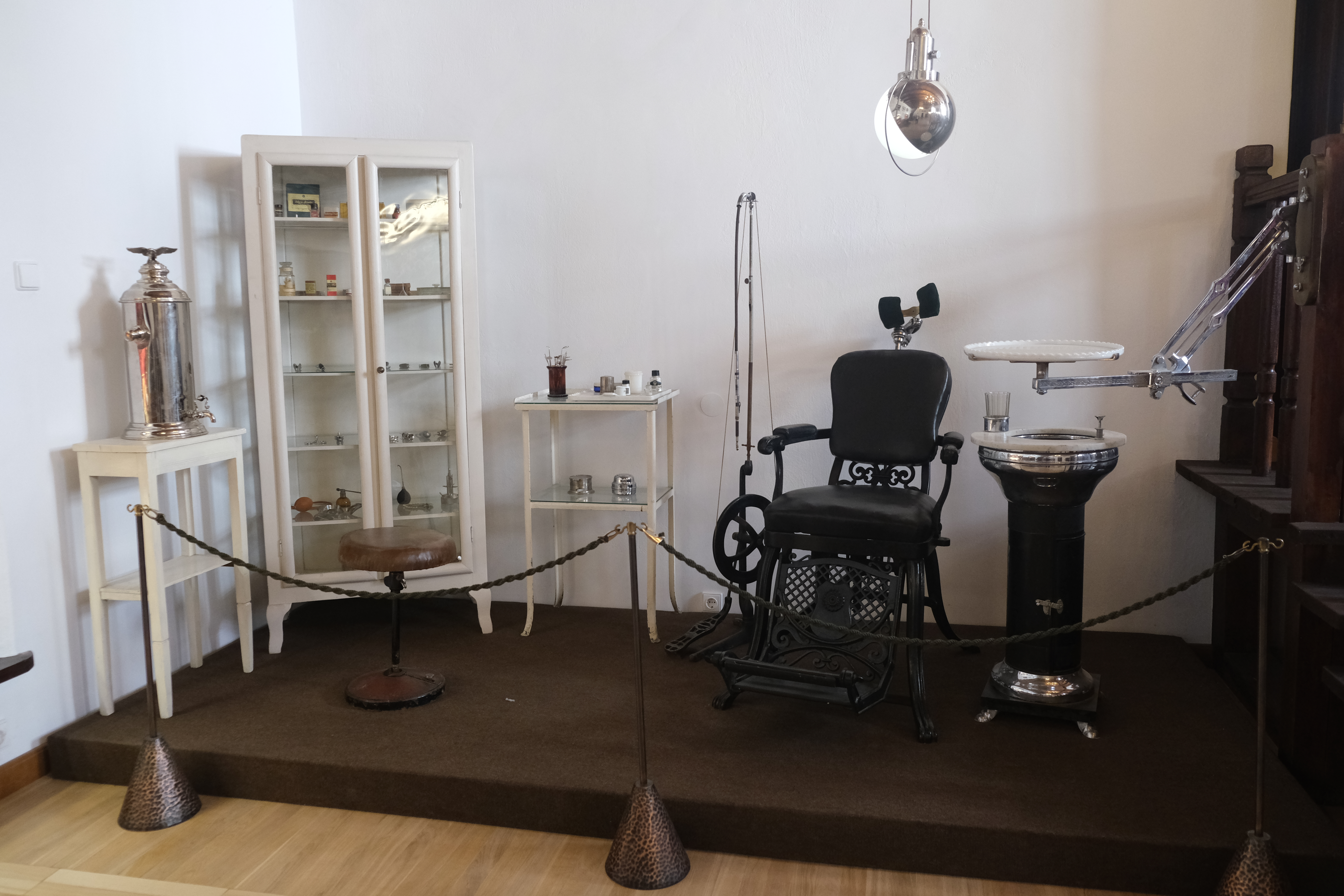
Historical cabinet of a dentist

- The oficina, or prescription room. This room was used to receive visitors and to sell pharmaceutical products and medicines. In Lithuania, pharmacy owners furnished their pharmacies as elegantly as possible in order to attract visitors and gain their trust.The museum's oficina preserves the medieval medicinal recipes - the elixir of youth and beauty recommended for women, "Syrup of Venus for Smoothing Hair" ("Syrupus Adianthi Capillorum Veneris"), and for men, "Elixir of Long Life" ("Elixir ad longam vitam")
- Koktorija (from Latin coquere - to cook, boil, dry). This room was used for making infusions and decoctions, washing and drying dishes and distilling water. The museum's koktorija exhibits instruments and apparatus used in the pharmacies of Lithuanian towns and villages between the end of the 19th and the beginning of the 20th centuries.
- "Material" room. This is the room with stocks of medicinal materials. Poisonous and potent substances were also stored in this room.
- Laboratory. Until the second half of the 19th century, the larger town pharmacies used to produce the various preparations they needed. The museum exhibits a steam line for the production of galenic formulations used in the pharmacy laboratory of the Kaunas Red Cross Hospital. Other machines were used in the chemical-pharmaceutical laboratory Sanitas between 1922 and 1950.
- Basement. The cellars of pharmacies used to store medicinal substances that required a lower temperature - oils and various fats. Larger cellars were also used for some processing operations, such as the crushing of raw materials and the production of ointments.
- The second floor halls display exhibits on the development of pharmacy in interwar Lithuania, the medicines used at that time, and the further development of pharmacy in the country.

== See also ==
- History of pharmacy
- History of medicine
