= Gymnasium of Lithuanian University of Health Sciences =

- Lietuvos sveikatos mokslų universiteto gimnazija
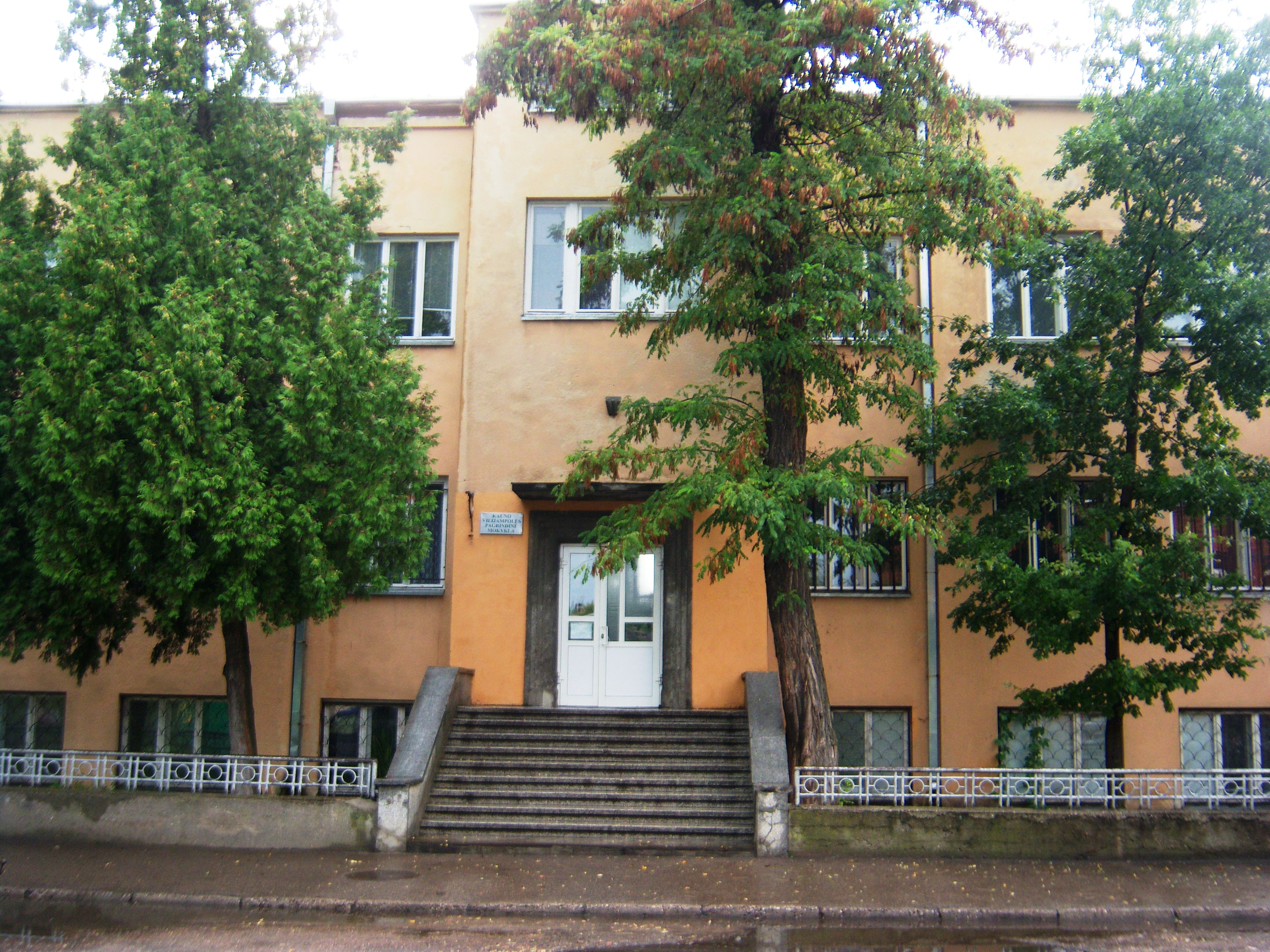

Location
- Seredžiaus g. 4 Kaunas, 47182; Lithuania
- 54°54′27″N 23°52′44″E

Information
- Established: 6 March 2013
- Founder: Lithuanian University of Health Sciences
- Director: Arūnas Bučnys
- Teaching staff: 49
- Grades: 5-12
- Gender: mixed
- Enrollment: 620
- Language: Lithuanian
- Colour
- Affiliations: Lithuanian University of Health Sciences
- Website: lsmugimnazija.lt

The Gymnasium of Lithuanian University of Health Sciences is a private school in the Vilijampolė district of Kaunas, Lithuania. It is owned by the Lithuanian University of Health Sciences.

== History ==
On 20 December 2012, Kaunas city municipality decided to transfer the building of the liquidated Vilijampolė school to the Lithuanian University of Health Sciences. On 6 March 2013, the school was legally registered. In the spring of 2013, the school building went under reconstruction. On 1 September 2013, the school was opened. In September 2015 Secondary school of Lithuanian University of Health Sciences was accredited as Gymnasium of Lithuanian University of Health Sciences.
