= Lithuanian University of Health Sciences =

Public university in Kaunas (2010-)

Coordinates: 54°53′39″N 23°54′59″E

- Lietuvos sveikatos mokslų universitetas
- Motto: Salus Pro Patria
- Motto in English: Health for the Fatherland
- Type: Public
- Established: 2010; 16 years ago
- Affiliations: EUA
- Rector: Rimantas Benetis
- Administrative staff: 1,107
- Students: 6,283
- Location: Kaunas, Lithuania
- Campus: Urban
- Colours
- Website: www.lsmuni.lt

University rankings

Regional – Overall
- QS Emerging Europe and Central Asia: 115 (2022)

Lithuanian University of Health Sciences (Lithuanian: Lietuvos sveikatos mokslų universitetas, LSMU) is a medical school in Kaunas, Lithuania. The present-day Lithuanian University of Health Sciences is a consolidation of two institutions of higher education, Kaunas University of Medicine and the Lithuanian Veterinary Academy. It uses the Hospital of Lithuanian University of Health Sciences Kaunas Clinics and the Kaunas Red Cross Hospital as teaching hospitals.

== History ==
It was founded in 2010 by merging Kaunas University of Medicine and the Lithuanian Veterinary Academy. In 2013, the Secondary school of Lithuanian University of Health Sciences was established in the Vilijampolė district of Kaunas.

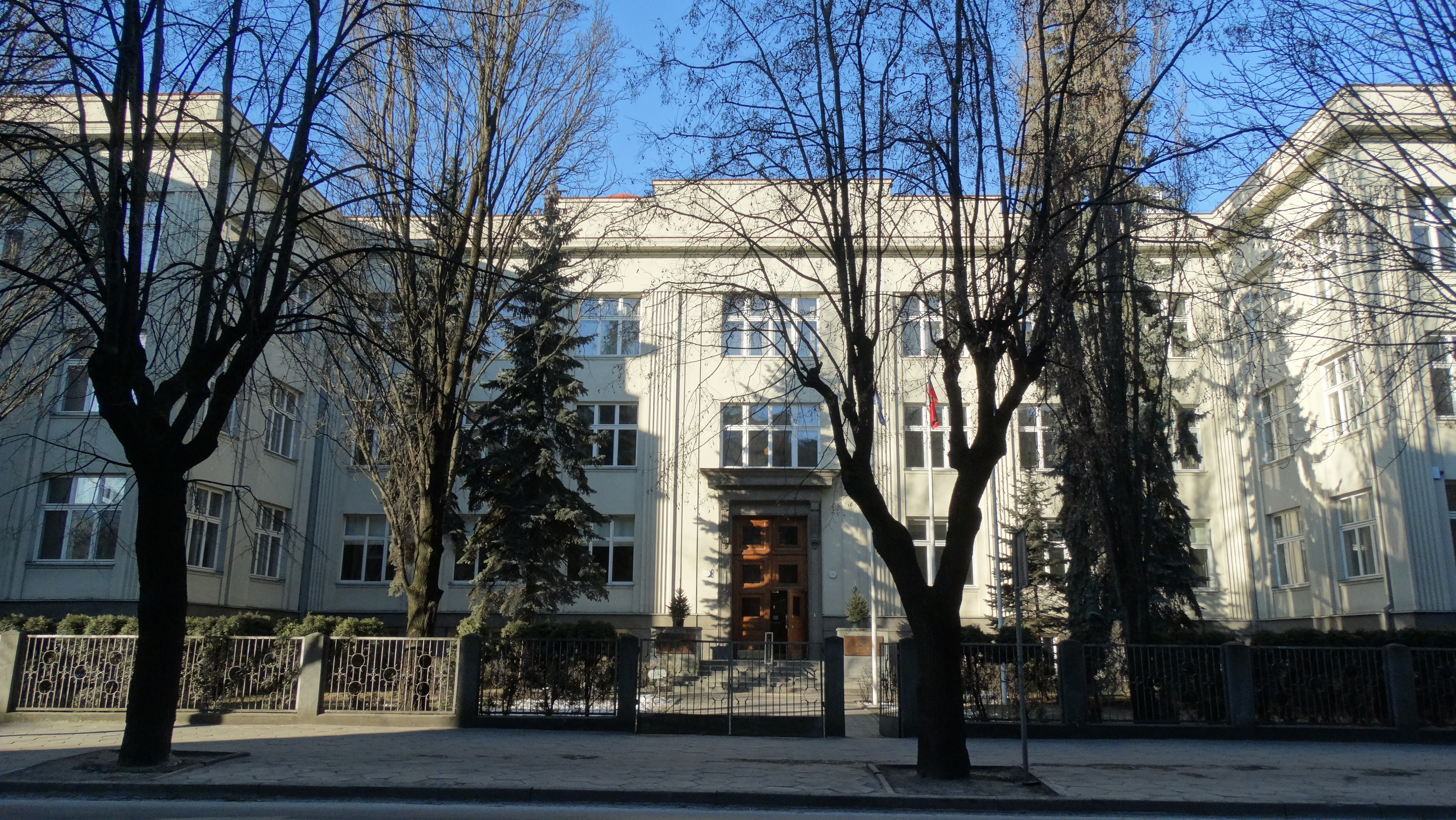
Lithuanian University of Health Sciences Medical Academy main building

Main building of the Hospital of Lithuanian University of Health Sciences Kaunas Clinics

LUHS Library and Information Centre

== Medical Academy ==
Medical Academy of the Lithuanian University of Health Sciences was founded in 1919 and from 1922 it was the Faculty of Medicine of the University of Lithuania. It is located in the center of Kaunas.

In 1950, after the closure of Kaunas University, it was reformed into a separate institution and was known as Kaunas Medical Institute until 1998. From 1998 to 2010 its name was Kaunas University of Medicine. In 2010 university was merged with Lithuanian Veterinary Academy forming the Lithuanian University of Health Sciences. Medical faculties were concentrated to Medical Academy.

The Lithuanian University of Health Sciences Medical Academy has 5 faculties:

- Faculty of Medicine
- Faculty of Odontology
- Faculty of Pharmacy
- Faculty of Nursing
- Faculty of Public Health

== Homeopathy ==
University's own pharmacy manufactures and actively promotes homeopathic medicines. Daiva Majiene, university's professor in medical technology, actively promotes homeopathy with various publications and claims that there are more than 5000 studies which prove homeopathy's effectiveness.

== Veterinary Academy ==
The academy began its history in 1922 as the Veterinary department, under the Faculty of Medicine in Kaunas University. In 1929 the department closed, due to a lack of funds, but was able to re-open in 1936. In the spring of 1943, the LVA, along with other institutions of higher education in Lithuania, was closed. During the postwar period, teaching and administrative staff experienced difficulties stemming from a lack of experienced teachers, text books and electricity. In the spring of 1946, a flood destroyed part of existing laboratories, buildings, and all laboratory animals. The academy recovered; in 1974 a scientific sector was established, and the number of students as well as teaching and scientific staff increased. In 2001 the Lithuanian Veterinary Institute and the Lithuanian Institute of Animal Science were incorporated into the academy's structure. In 2010 the academy was merged with the Kaunas University of Medicine to form the Lithuanian University of Health Sciences. The academy is located in Vilijampolė district, Kaunas.

Teaching facilities at the Veterinary Academy include 12 scientific laboratories, acting under the departments; the Continuing Education Centre; and a library.

Research facilities at the academy include the Milking Training Centre; the Practical Instruction and Research Centre; the Teaching Farm, which issues healthy herd certificates; the Modern Cold Storage Farm (with teaching rooms); Large and Small Animal Clinics; the Laboratory of Livestock Carcass Classification; Mobile Ambulatory Clinics; and 12 research laboratories.

The Lithuanian University of Health Sciences Veterinary Academy has 2 faculties:

- Faculty of Veterinary Medicine
- Faculty of Animal Husbandry Technology

The Faculty of Veterinary Medicine offers three programmes:

- Veterinary Medicine (in Lithuanian and English);
- Veterinary Food Safety (in Lithuanian and English);
- Food Science (Bachelor studies in Lithuanian; Master’s studies in Lithuanian and English).

== Organizations of LUHS ==
The University operates the Museum of the History of Lithuanian Medicine and Pharmacy. Students' Union, KIMSU, Ave vita, SOA, SMD, Choir of LUHS "Neris", LiMSA, Fraternitas Lituanica, Gaja, SFD, VASA, Juventus, Džigūnas, Kupolė.
