= Kaunas Clinics =

Hospital of Lithuanian University of Health Sciences Kaunas Clinics

- Main building of Hospital of Lithuanian University of Health Sciences Kaunas Clinics

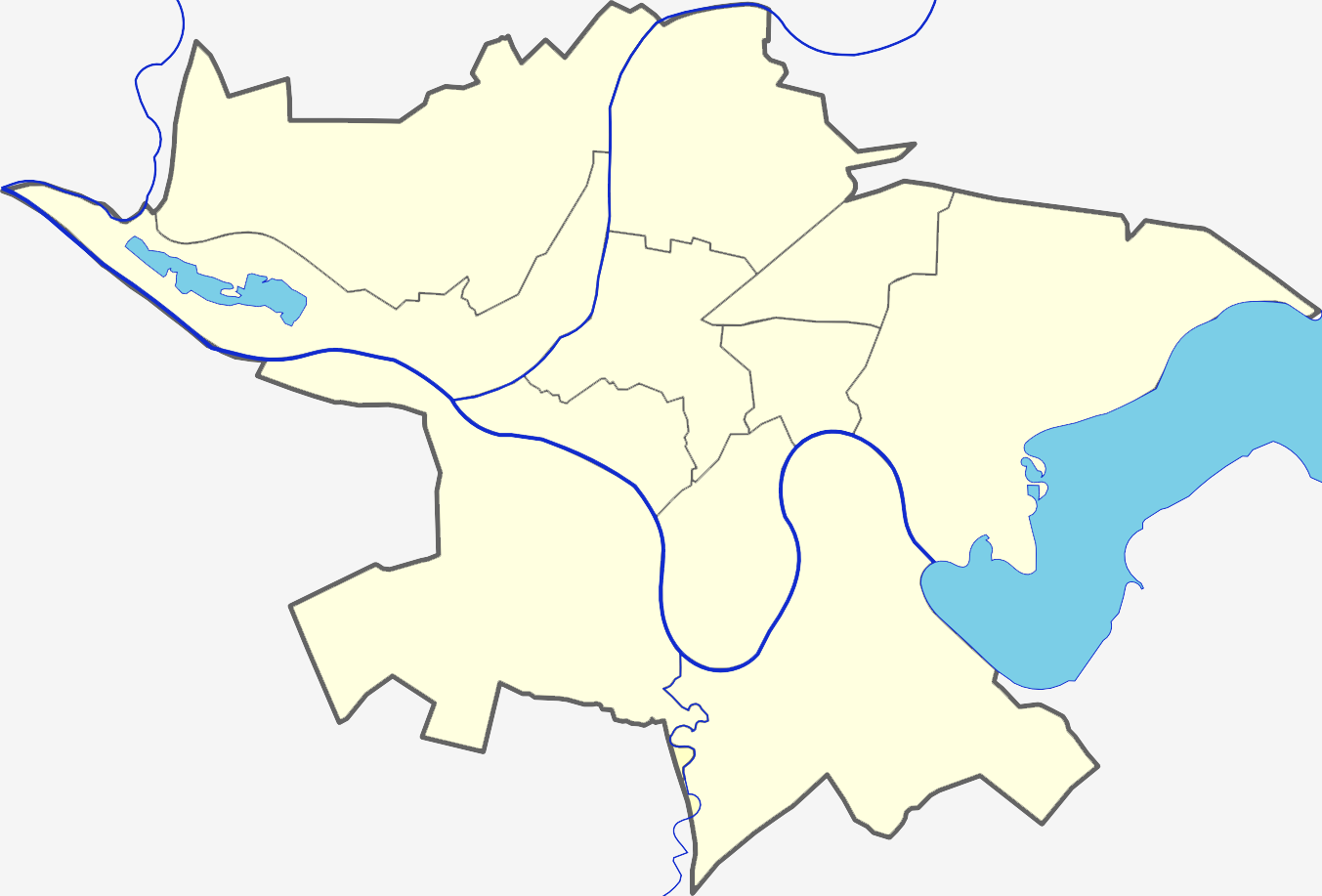
- Location within Kaunas Kaunas Clinics (Lithuania)

Geography
- Location: Kaunas, Lithuania
- Coordinates: 54.918333°N 23.921111°E

Organisation
- Type: Teaching
- Affiliated university: Lithuanian University of Health Sciences

Services
- Emergency department: Level III Trauma and Emergency Center
- Beds: up to 2000

Helipads
- Helipad: Yes

History
- Founded: 1939

Links
- Website: www.kaunoklinikos.lt
- Lists: Hospitals in Lithuania

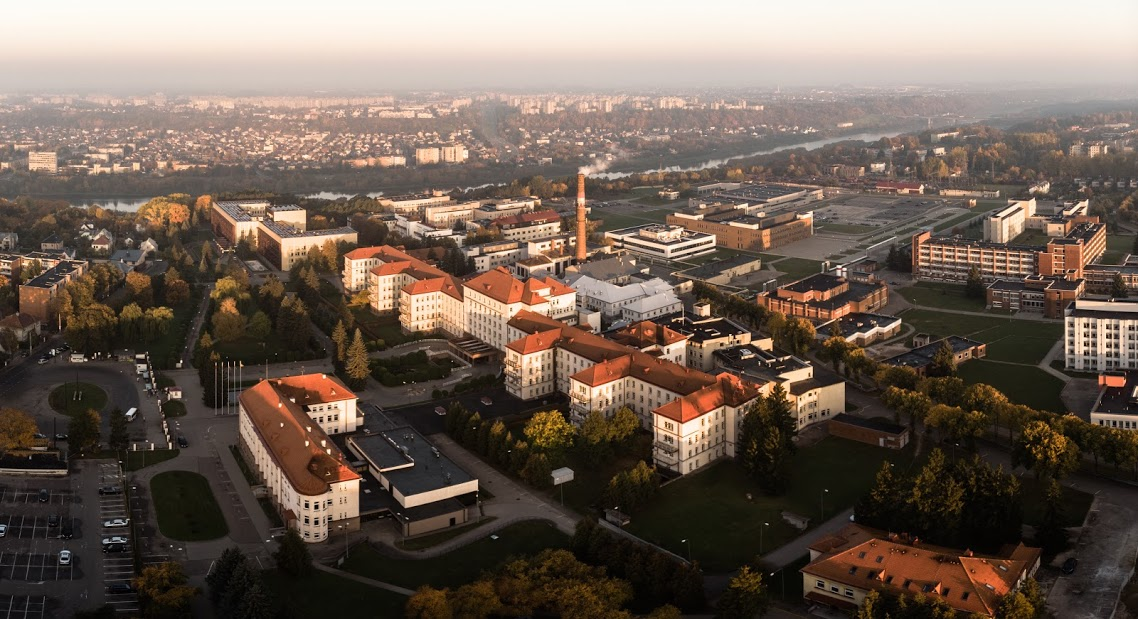
Aerial view of the clinics

Hospital library

Hospital of Lithuanian University of Health Sciences Kaunas Clinics (Lithuanian: Lietuvos sveikatos mokslų universiteto ligoninė Kauno klinikos) is the largest and the most advanced medical institution in Lithuania and Baltic States. The entire hospital complex is 160 thousand square meters over an area of 36 hectares. Within the 15 on-campus buildings, there are 35 departments with different clinical profiles and 15 departments for out patient care. As of 2009, more than 1,200 medical doctors and 2,500 nursing specialists are working at the hospital. Since 2016 the hospital has been governed by habilitated doctor Renaldas Jurkevičius. Kaunas Clinics performs more than 60,000 operations per annum. Since June 29, 2015 it is the only hospital in Lithuania to have highest level (Level 3) Trauma and Emergency Center for both – adult and children. The Kaunas Clinics is capable of performing the most advanced surgeries, including heart transplants. Compared to other hospitals in Europe, Kaunas clinics is distinguished in the fields of vascular surgery, neurosurgery and otorhinolaryngology.

== Name changes ==
- until 1948 – Vytautas Magnus University Clinics
- 1948–1952 – Kaunas Area Clinical Hospital
- 1952–1983 – Kaunas Republican Clinical Hospital
- 1983–1986 – Clinic of the Ministry of Health BMI
- 1986–1990 – Petras Jasinskas Clinic
- 1990–1995 – Kaunas Republican Clinical Hospital
- 1995–2010 – Kaunas University of Medicine Clinics
- since 2010 – Hospital of Lithuanian University of Health Sciences Kauno klinikos

== History ==
Old logo of Kaunas Clinics

During the interwar period, Lithuanian politicians and medical experts perceived a need for a major hospital complex in the area, and gathered to discuss the possibility on February 5, 1936. Soon afterwards the Lithuanian cabinet adopted a resolution to build a hospital near the Seventh Fort. An international competition was held to select the best project. Six different proposals were submitted, two of them from outside Lithuania. The commission chose proposal "XXX", by the French architects Urbain Cassan and Elie Ouchanoff.

The development of the hospital quickly gained momentum. Urbain Cassan met with physicians to gather feedback and hear specific requests and proposals for the arrangement of rooms. These discussions went on for about ten days. The building commission acted in coordination to review the designs and sketches, which resulted in redesigns of, and improvements to, several aspects of the initial proposal. In 1937 the cornerstone was laid, marking the active phase of construction. The work continued until July 1939; it employed several of the newest building technologies. The hospital complex comprised six buildings, covering about 160,000 square meters, including a 75-meter-tall chimney. Its major buildings were linked through tunnels, with a total length of one kilometer. Cork was used as flooring in the corridors so as to minimize disturbances to patients. The hospital opened in 1940.

When Lithuania was occupied during World War II, the hospital was adjusted to meet its new needs. The buildings were redecorated with camouflage colors. After the war the hospital underwent further expansion. In 1967 a medical research and laboratory complex was built, followed in 1972 by an obstetrical and gynaecology center, and a few years an eye-care clinic was added. Between 1976 and 1982 a cardiac clinic and a neurosurgery center were constructed, and gardens were planted.

The University Hospital complex consisted in 2008 of 15 buildings where approximately two thousand patients could be treated simultaneously. On May 7, 2008 Kaunas University Hospital was declared a cultural monument. On June 1, 2012 the new building for the Clinic of Children's Disease was opened. On June 29, 2015 the new highest level (Level 3) Trauma and Emergency Center for adults and children was opened.

== Clinics ==
- Anesthesia
- Cardiology
- Children's diseases
- Children's surgery
- Dental and oral diseases
- Dental and Maxillary Orthopedics
- Ear, nose, and throat
- Emergency medicine
- Endocrinology
- Eye care
- Family medicine
- Gastroenterology
- General surgery
- Genetics and molecular medicine
- Heart, thoracic and vascular surgery
- Hematology
- Infectious diseases
- Intensive care
- Internal diseases
- Laboratory
- Maxillofacial surgery
- Nephrology
- Neonatology
- Neurosurgery
- Neurology
- Obstetrics and Gynecology
- Oncology
- Oral Care and Pediatric Odontology
- Orthodontics
- Orthopedics and Traumatology
- Pathological anatomy
- Pediatric surgery
- Plastic and Reconstructive surgery
- Psychiatry
- Pulmonology and Immunology
- Radiology
- Rehabilitation
- Rheumatology
- Sports medicine
- Skin and Venereal diseases
- Urology
