= Kėdainiai Hospital =

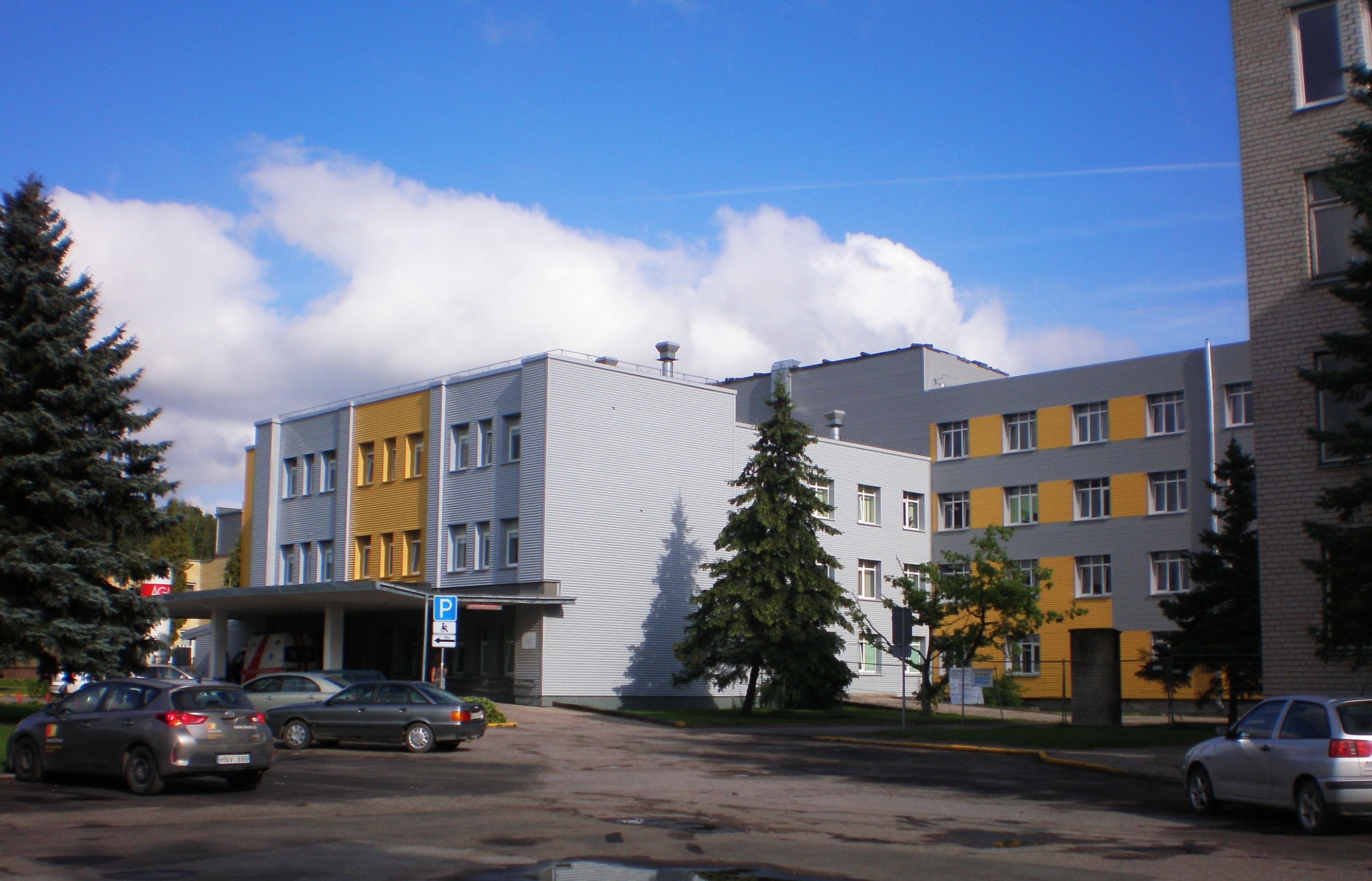

Geography
- Location: Budrio g. 5, Kėdainiai, Lithuania
- Coordinates: 55°18′34″N 23°59′2″E

Organisation
- Type: District, General

Services
- Emergency department: Yes
- Beds: 270

History
- Founded: 16 May 1888
- Demolished: 1944

Links
- Website: www.kedainiuligonine.lt

Kėdainiai Hospital is one of the oldest hospitals in the region, providing general inpatient, outpatient, rehabilitation, medical nursing and support services for the residents of Kėdainiai district in Lithuania.

== History ==
The first hospital in Kėdainiai was established in 1888 with an appointment of Ivanas Eustachovskis as the chief medical doctor. The hospital had 10 beds and was located in a rented house on Didžioji street. The initial tenancy agreement has been concluded for three years, then extended to 12 years at an annual rental fee of 300 rubles.

In 1897 the hospital was relocated to its own wooden building donated by Victoria Totleben in memory of her late husband general Eduard Totleben. Later, the same Victoria Totleben commissioned to build a new hospital built of brick, which opened in 1900 and was named Kėdainiai Eduard Totleben Village Hospital (today the building is occupied by a local Labour Exchange office). The hospital had 40 beds and its own electricity generator, as Kedainiai did not have a constant power supply at the time.

In 1937, now under the local government's initiative, a new 75-bed hospital worth 330,000 litas was built nearby and named the Hospital Palace. However, the joy was short-lived as it was demolished by retreating Nazi army in 1944. Rescued equipment was moved to the Village Hospital, which again served the main hospital's function.

Due to the shortage of beds and poor working conditions, the local government has repeatedly called the Lithuanian Ministers' council asking for funds to rebuild the demolished hospital. Eventually, in 1965 a new 240-bed hospital was built in the new location where it remains today.
