= Kaunas Red Cross Hospital =

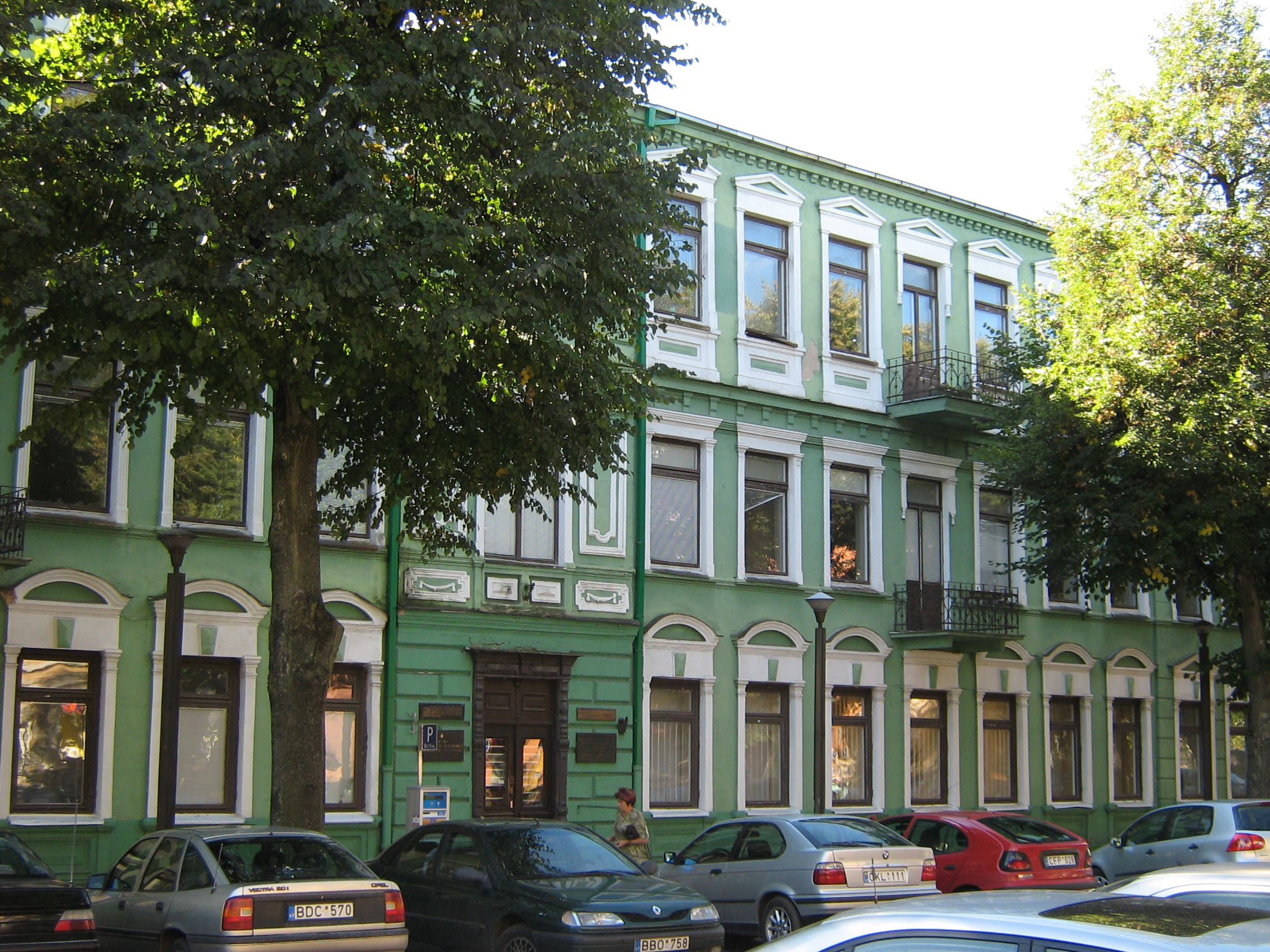

Geography
- Coordinates: 54°53′47″N 23°55′22″E

Organisation
- Affiliated university: Kaunas Medical Institute, Kaunas University of Medicine

History
- Opened: November 29, 1908

Red Cross Hospital in Kaunas is the oldest still functioning hospital in the city and in Lithuania.

== History ==
The Kaunas Red Cross Hospital was founded November 29, 1908.

The Medical Faculty of the Higher Courses (later developed to University of Lithuania) was established around the hospital. Until Kaunas Medical University Clinics was built, it was main hospital of Kaunas. Since 1922, it was the teaching hospital of Vytautas Magnus University. Since the closure of the University in Kaunas in1951, it has become the teaching hospital of Kaunas Medical Institute and Kaunas University of Medicine (since 1982).

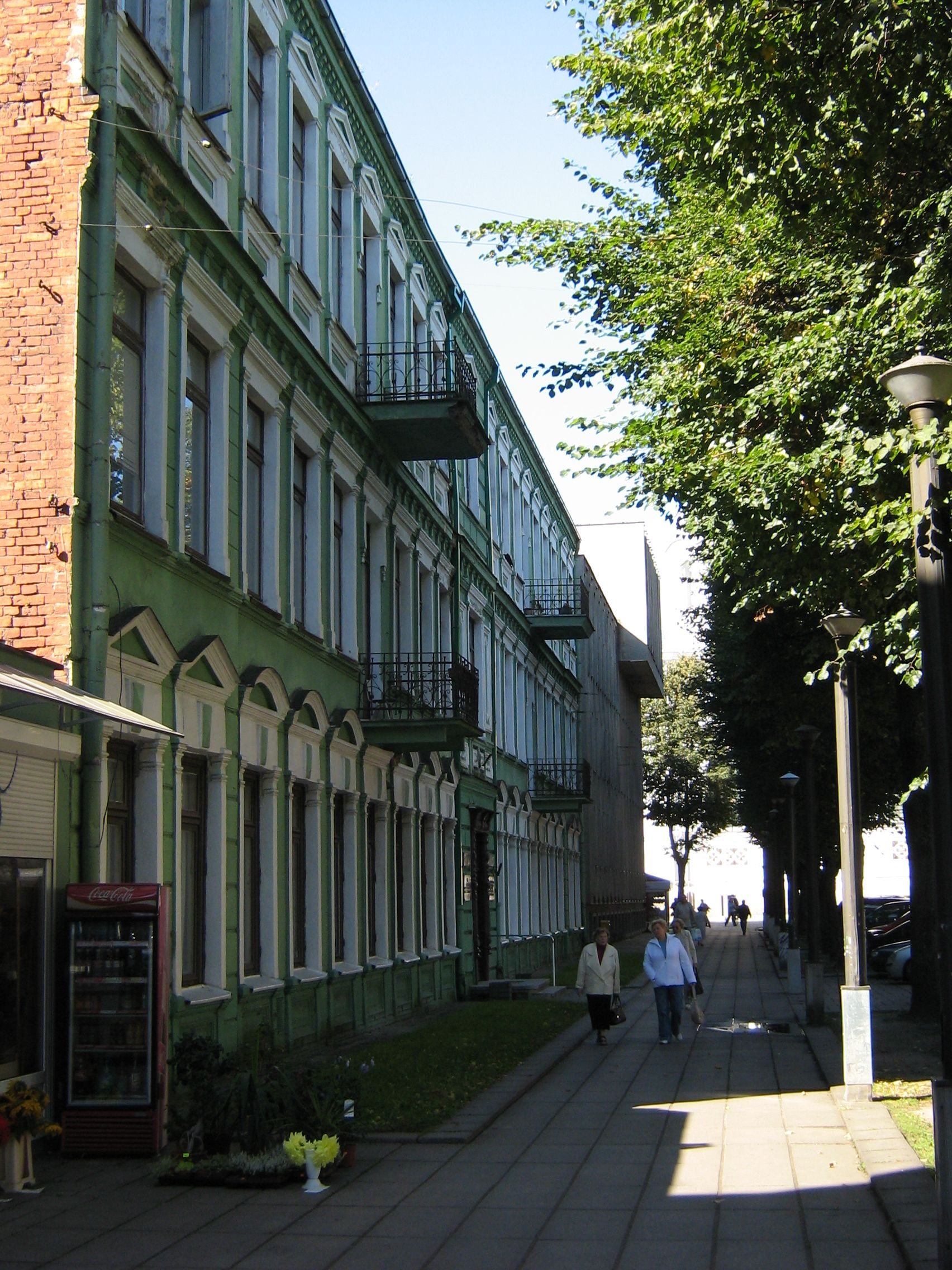
Red Cross Hospital with a view to Nepriklausomybės Square

The hospital is located in the Centras elderate on the corner of Laisvės Alėja and Gediminas street at Nepriklausomybės square.
