= Vilnius University Hospital Santaros Clinics =

- Vilnius University

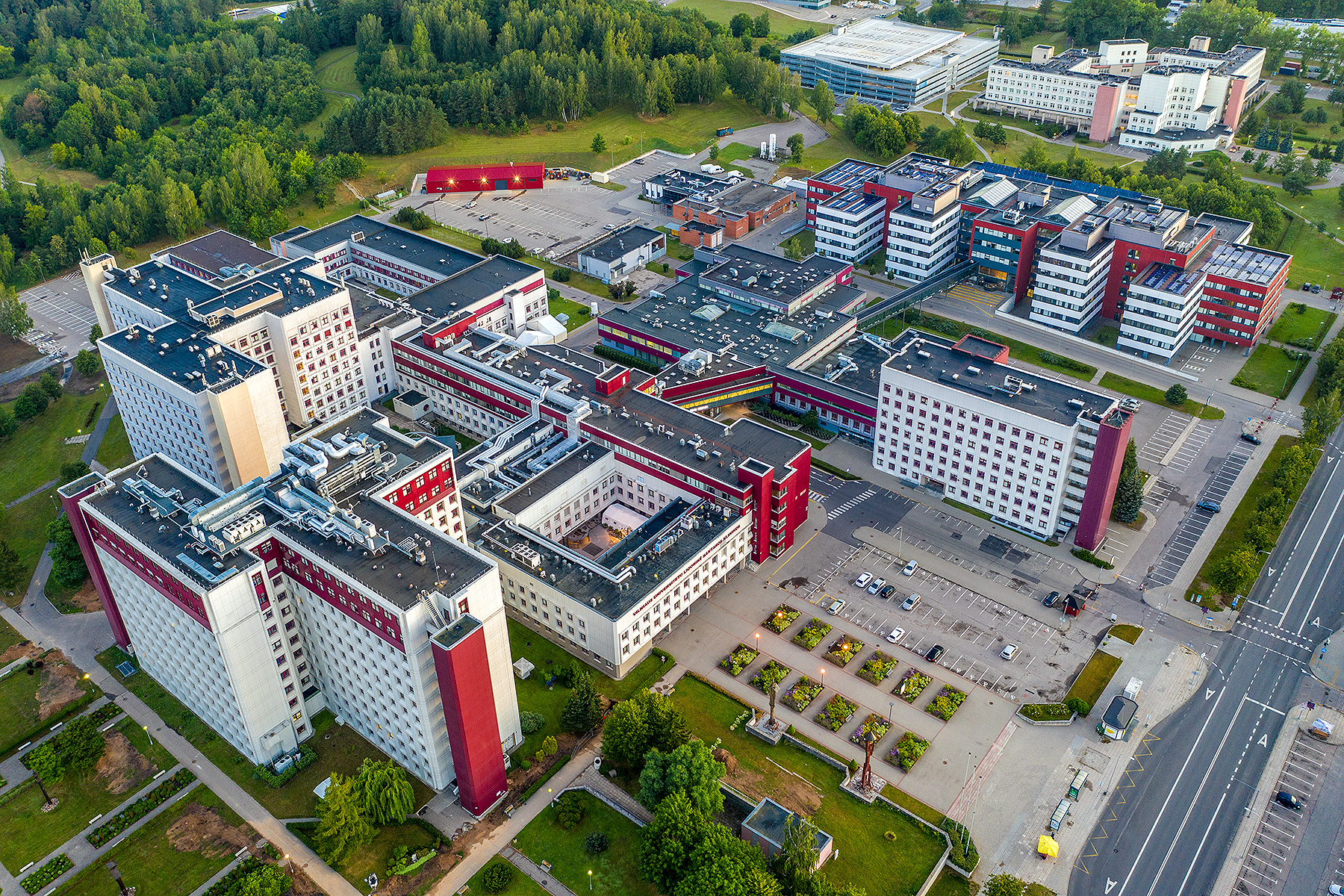
- Campus of Vilnius University Hospital Santaros Clinics

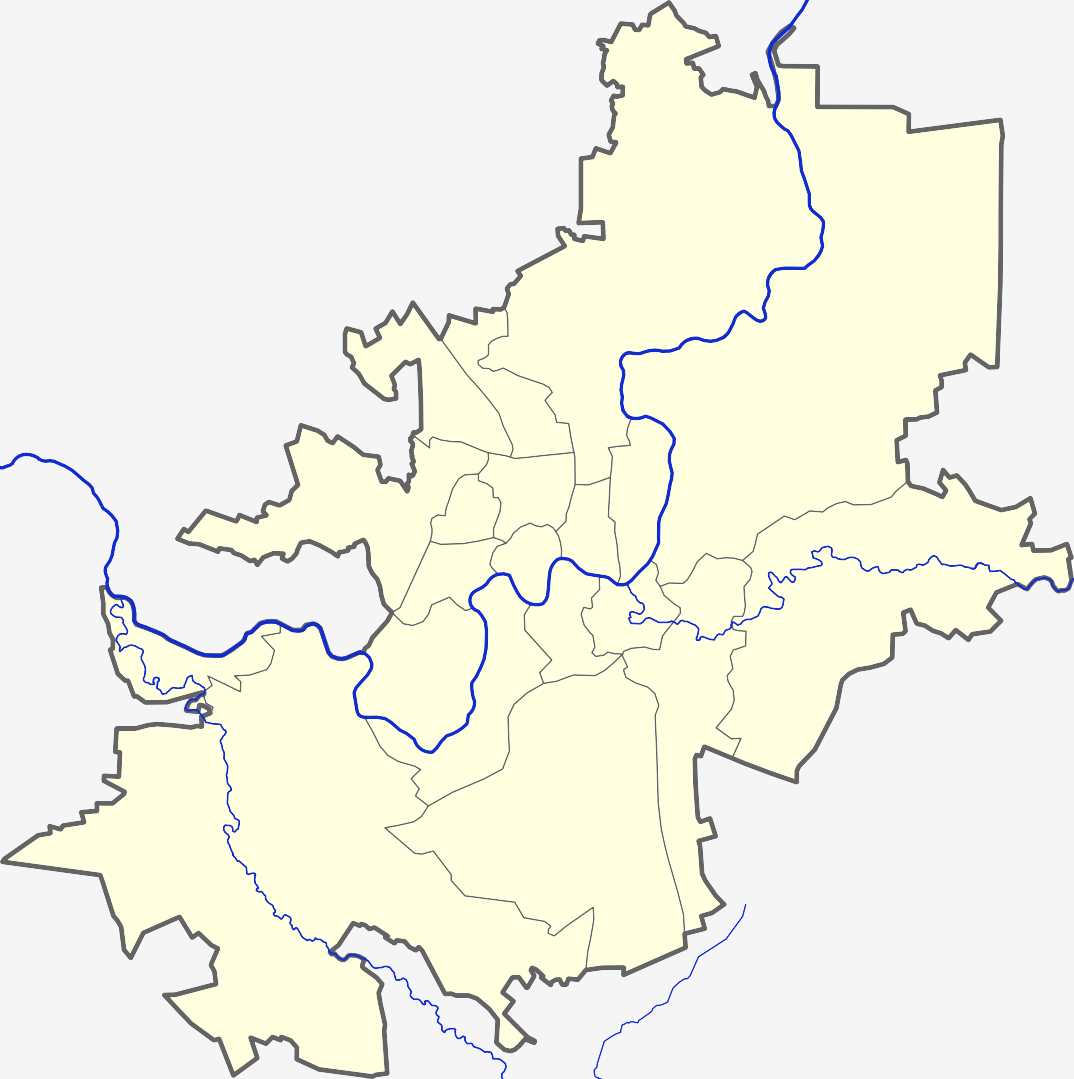
- Location within Vilnius Vilnius University Hospital Santaros Clinics (Lithuania)

Geography
- Location: Santariškių g. 2, LT-08661, Vilnius, Lithuania
- Coordinates: 54°45′7″N 25°16′40″E

Organisation
- Type: Teaching
- Affiliated university: Vilnius University

Services
- Emergency department: Yes

History
- Founded: 1980

Links
- Website: www.santa.lt
- Lists: Hospitals in Lithuania

Vilnius University Hospital Santaros Clinics (Lithuanian: Vilniaus Universiteto ligoninė Santaros klinikos, formerly known as Santariškių Klinikos) in Vilnius, Lithuania is a teaching hospital of the Vilnius University Faculty of Medicine. Santaros Klinikos is co-funded by the Lithuanian Ministry of Health and Vilnius University. It has a staff of 5372 employees, including 1409 medical doctors, 1978 nurses and other highly qualified professionals. More than 370 professors and doctorates and 4 academics are providing assistance to the patients.

== History ==
The Vilnius University Hospital Santaros Klinikos was founded as the Republican Vilnius Clinical Hospital in November, 1980, when the block of therapy and divisions of diagnostics started working. In 1982, the first patients were admitted to the Consultative Out-patient Department, whereas the block of surgery was opened in 1983.

== Centers and departments ==
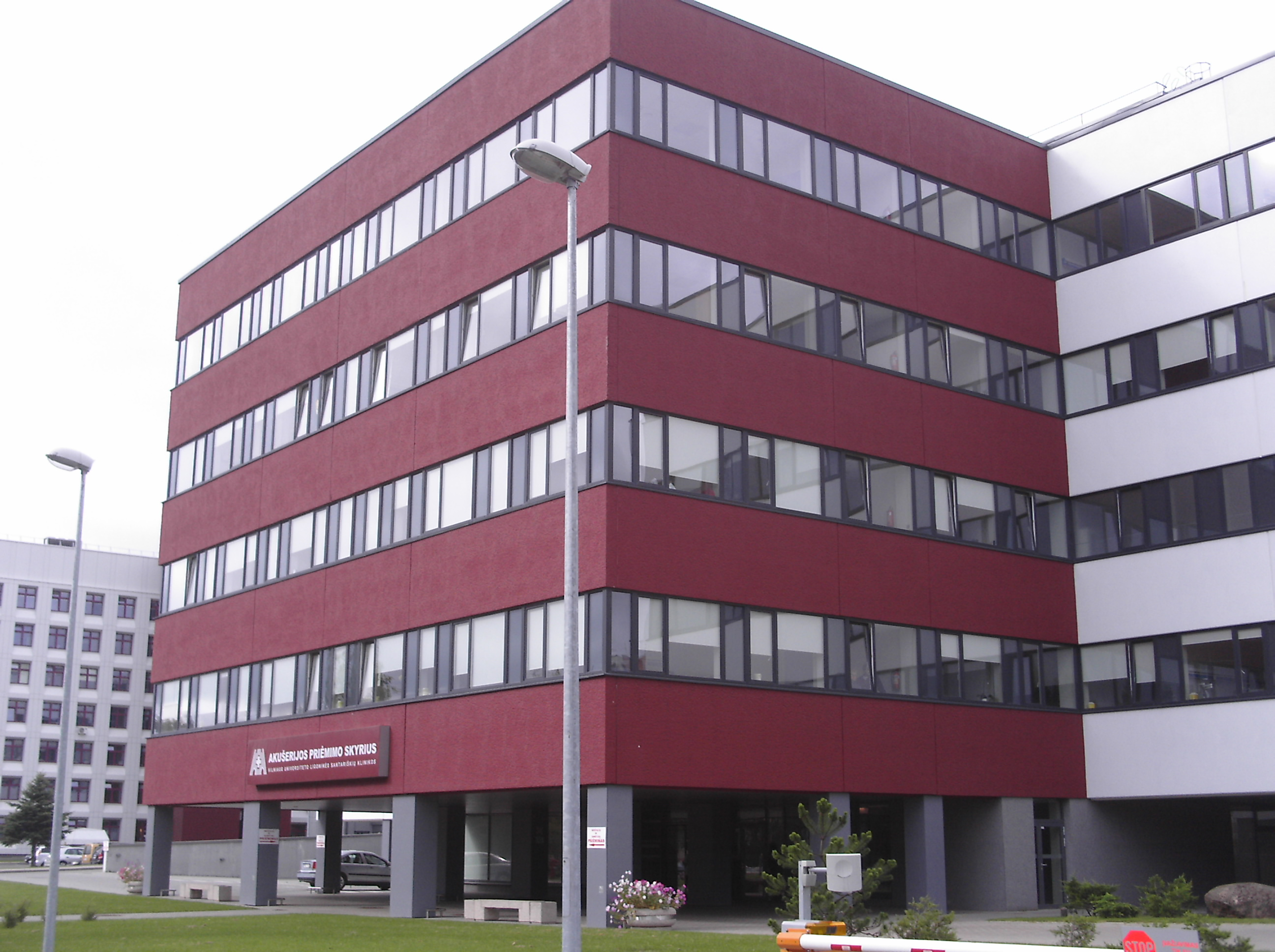
Maternity Unit

The hospital has these centres:

- Centre of Neurology
- Centre of Medical Genetics
- Centre of Abdominal surgery
- Centre of Anaesthesiology, Intensive therapy and Pain Management
- Centre of Family Medicine
- Centre of Hepatology, Gastroenterology and Dietetics
- Centre of Laboratory medicine
- Centre of Nephrology
- Centre of Pulmonary Hypertension Referral
- Centre of Pulmonology and Allergology
- Centre of Rheumatology
- Department of Clinical Pharmacology
- Nursing Study Centre
- Radiology and Nuclear Medicine Centre
- Urology Centre
- Centre of Informatics and Development
