= Yenta =

Jewish given female name; Yiddish term for noblewoman or busybody

Yenta or Yente (Yiddish: יענטע) is a Yiddish woman's given name. It is a variant form of the name Yentl (Yiddish: יענטל), which is thought to be derived from the old Italian word "gentile", which used to mean 'noble' or 'refined', akin to English "genteel".

The name has entered American English only in the form yenta in the senses of "meddler, busybody, blabbermouth, gossip" and is not only used to refer to women. Both the forms yenta and yente are used in Yinglish (Jewish varieties of English) to refer to someone who is a gossip or a busybody.

The use of yenta as a word for 'busybody' originated in the age of Yiddish theatre. During and after World War I, Yiddish-language discs recorded in New York by theatre actors such as Clara Gold and Gus Goldstein portrayed the characters Mendel and Yente Telebende and sold so well that dozens of copycat recordings were made. The popularity continued in the 1920s and 1930s as the humorist Jacob Adler, writing under the pen name B. Kovner for The Jewish Daily Forward, wrote a series of comic sketches featuring the characters, with Yente as a 'henpecking wife'. The popularity of the character led to the name developing its colloquial sense of 'a gossip'.

There is a mistaken belief that the word for a Jewish matchmaker is yenta or yente. In reality a Jewish matchmaker is called a shadchan (שדכן). The origin of this error is the 1964 musical Fiddler on the Roof, in which a character named Yente serves as the matchmaker for the village of Anatevka.

== Notable persons ==
- Yente Serdatzky, Jewish-American Yiddish-language writer.
- Yente (18th-century), Jewish spiritual Hasidic leader
- Rosanne Yente Hertzberger, Dutch microbiologist and politician

== See also ==
- Yentl (disambiguation)
