= Yentl =

Yentl may refer to:

== Given name ==
- A variant of Yenta
- Yentl Schieman from the Yentl en De Boer duo
- Yentl Vandevelde
- Yentl Van Genechten

== Other ==
- Yentl the Yeshiva Boy, short story by Isaac Bashevis Singer in Short Friday and Other Stories (1963)
- Yentl (play), 1975 play by Leah Napolin and Isaac Bashevis Singer based on the short story
- Yentl (film), 1983 American film based on the short story
- Yentl (soundtrack), 1983 soundtrack album to the film
- Yentl syndrome
