= Aleksotas Hill =

Hill in Lithuania

Coordinates: 54°53′29.8″N 23°53′11.5″E

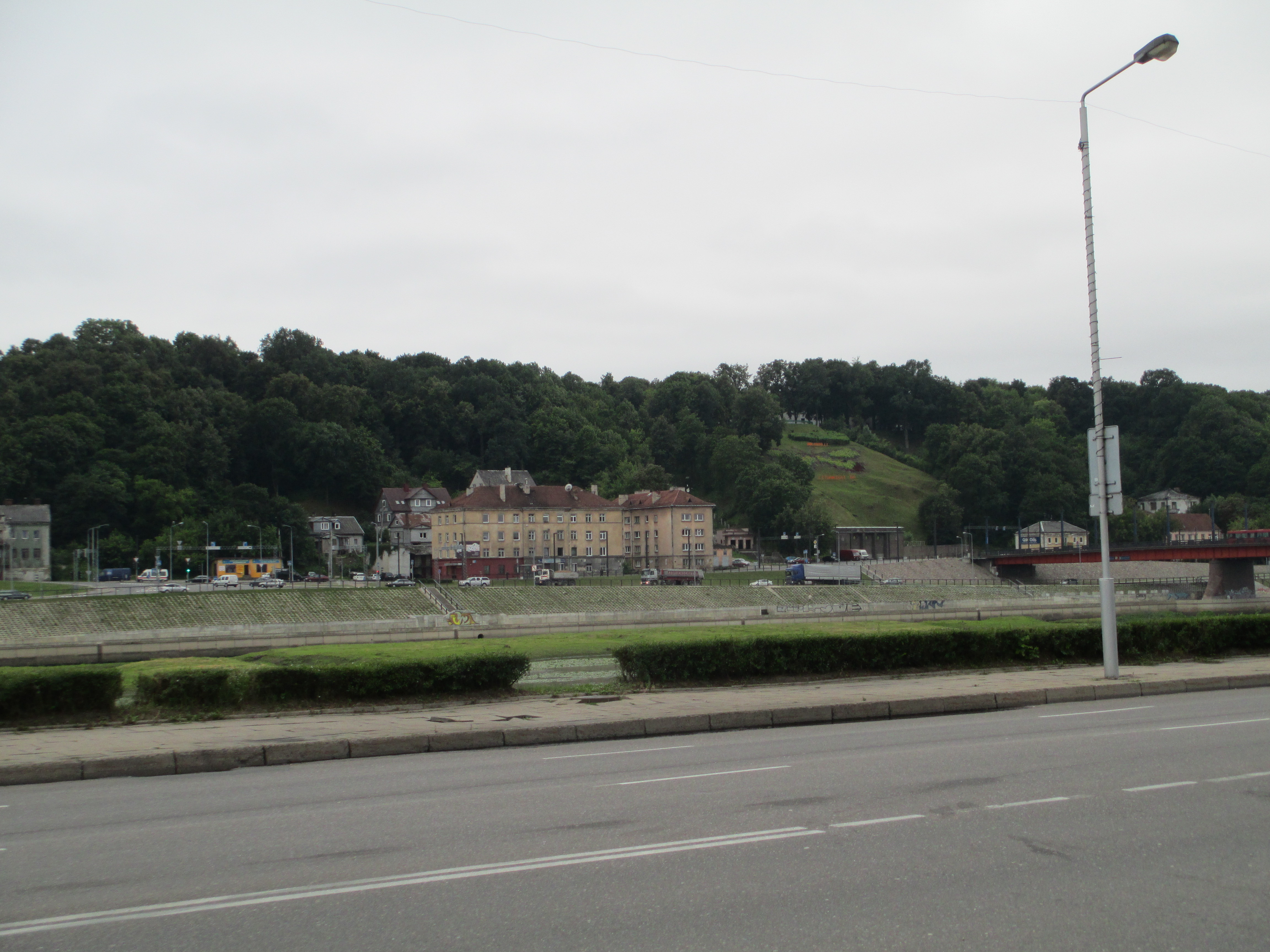
Aleksotas Hill in Kaunas

Aleksotas Hill (Lithuanian: Aleksoto kalnas) is a hill in Kaunas near Nemunas River. There is an observation deck to the Kaunas Old Town which was renovated in 2020 and Aleksotas Funicular.
