= Aleksotas Funicular =

Funicular railway in Kaunas, Lithuania

Coordinates: 54°53′28″N 23°53′13″E

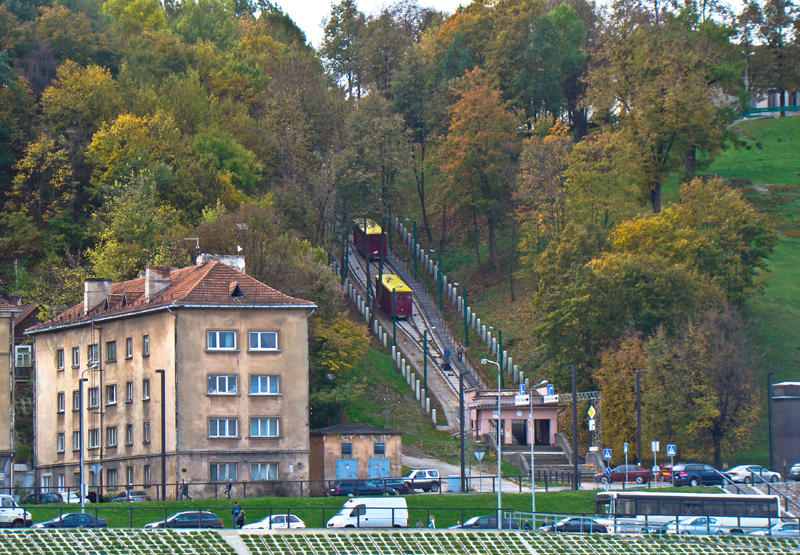

Overview
- Status: In service
- Locale: Kaunas
- Stations: 2
- Website: http://kaunoautobusai.lt/paslaugos/aleksoto-funikulierius/

Service
- Type: Funicular
- Services: 1
- Operator(s): UAB „Kauno Autobusai“
- Rolling stock: 2

History
- Opened: 1935

Technical
- Line length: 132.9 m (436 ft)
- Number of tracks: 1
- Track gauge: 1,000 mm (3 ft 3 3/8 in) metre gauge

Aleksotas Funicular (Lithuanian: Aleksoto funikulierius) is a funicular railway located in Aleksotas elderate of Kaunas, Lithuania. The funicular constructed on the right bank of the Nemunas River was officially opened on 6 December 1935. The track of the Aleksotas funicular remained unchanged. The track has a separation in the centre of the track for carriages to pass. Special automatic brakes were installed in carriages not to let them run down in case of cable damage. The length of funicular is 132.9 metres (436 ft), gradient - 18 degrees. Authentic traction equipment, including the genuine pre-war wagons, wooden seats, and stop platforms of the funicular are still used.

The funicular climbs from the end of the Vytautas the Great Bridge to the Aleksotas hill from where the panorama of the Old Town of Kaunas can be experienced. It was included in the Registry of Immovable Cultural Heritage Sites of the Republic of Lithuania in 1996. Periodic KVT tickets can be used here.

In 2015, the funicular was one of 44 objects in Kaunas to receive the European Heritage Label.

== Image gallery ==
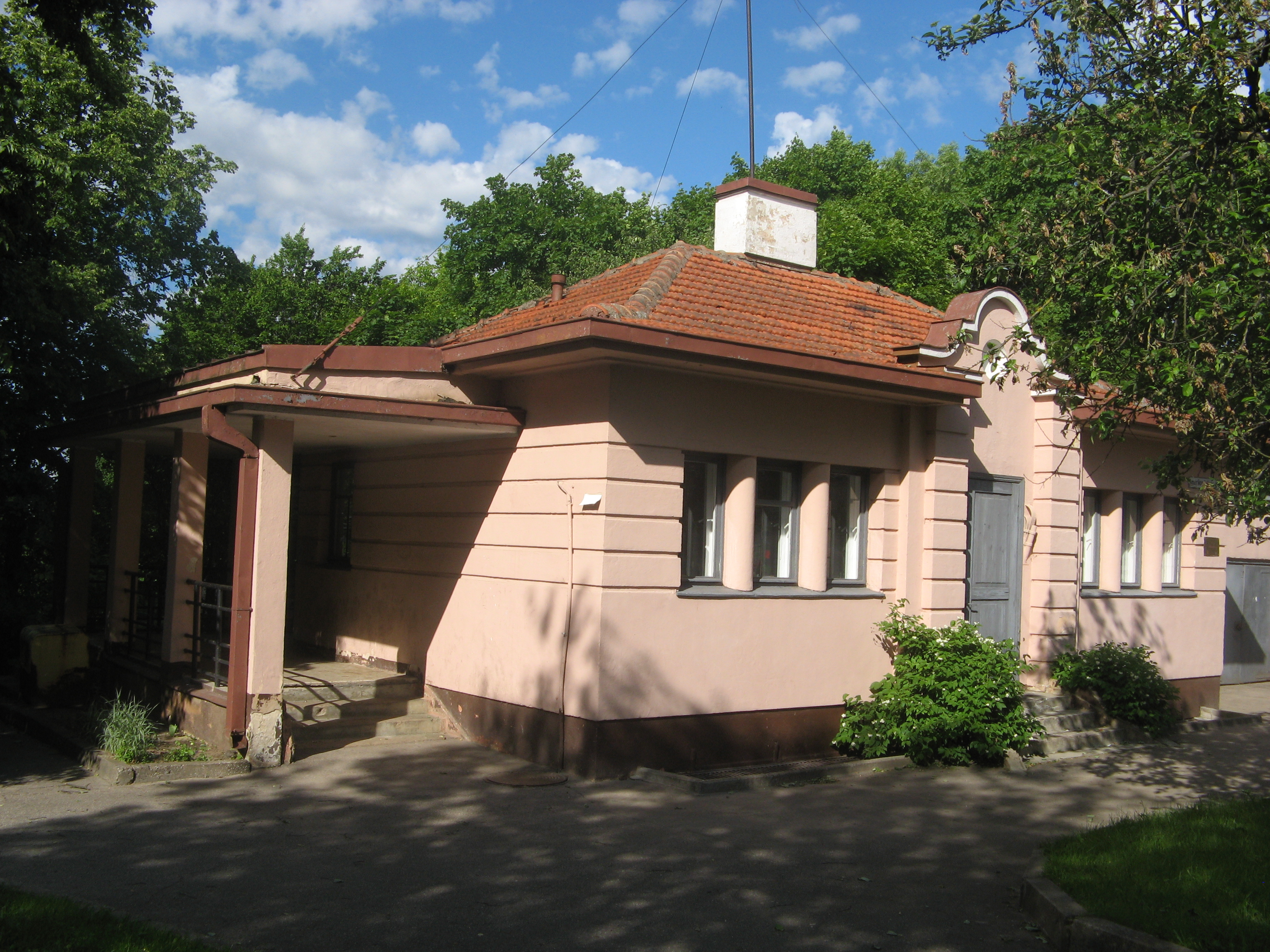
Aleksotas Funicular Railway at the top

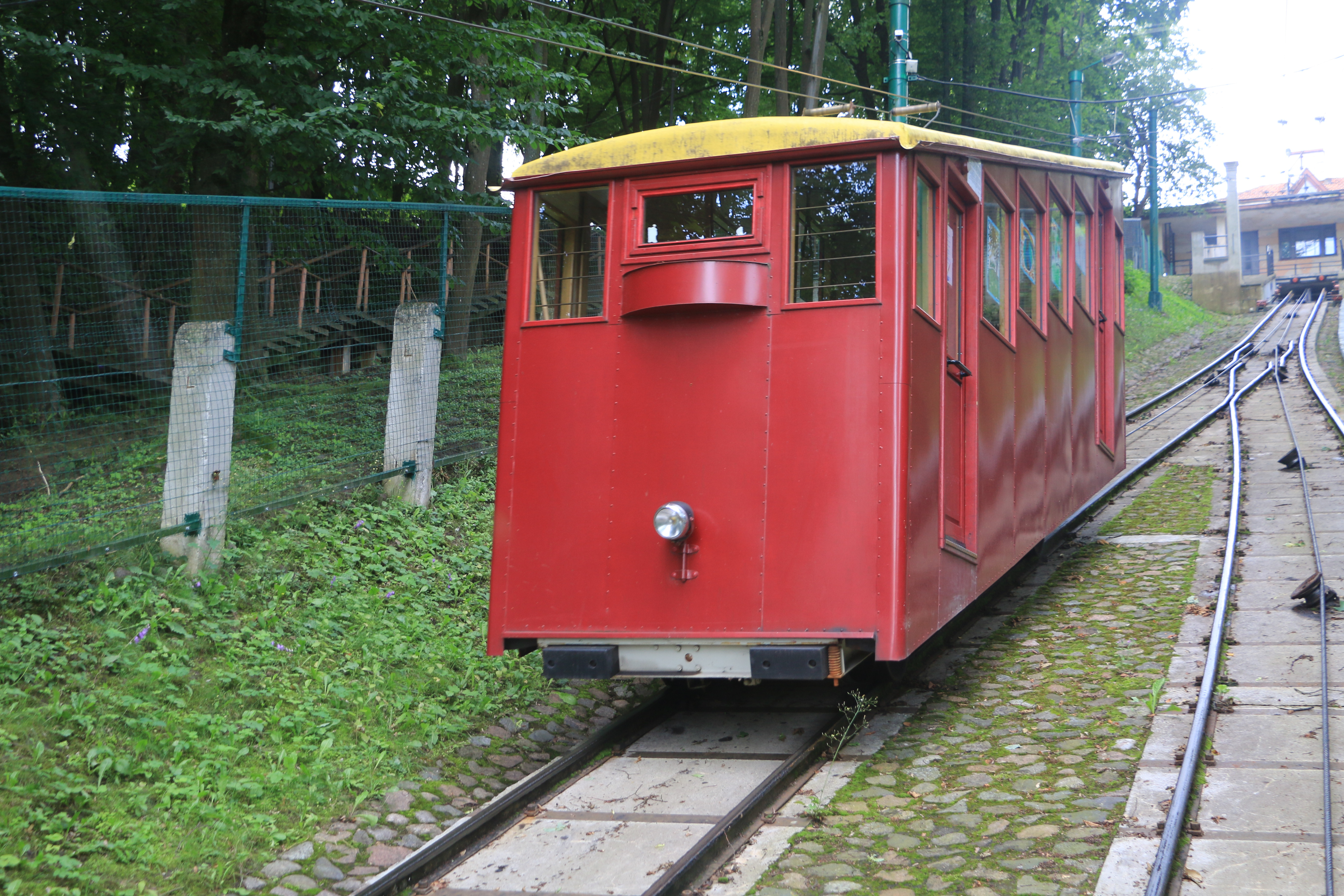
One of the wagons

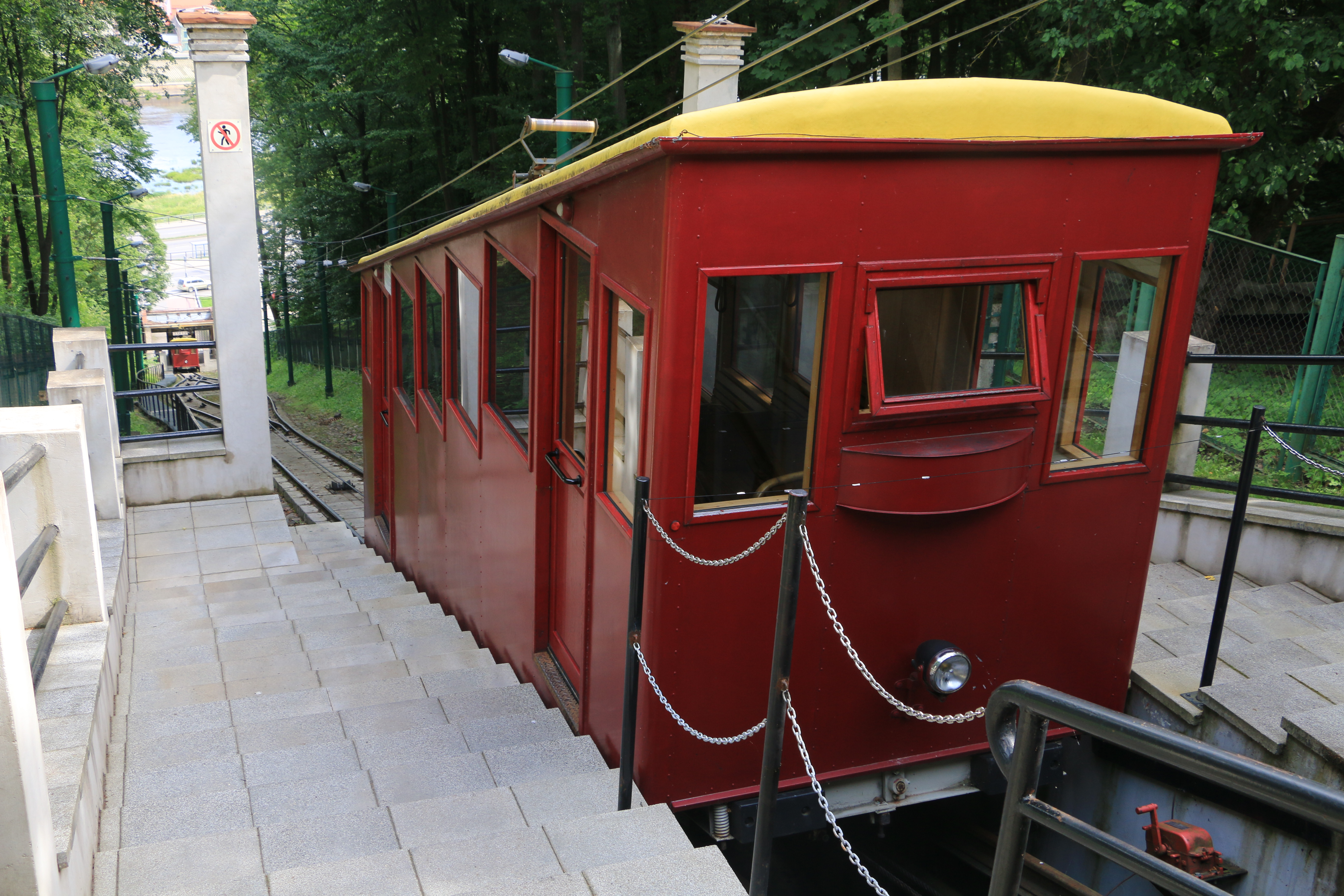
One of the wagons

== See also ==
- List of funicular railways
- Žaliakalnis Funicular Railway completed in Kaunas in 1931
