= Clara Gold =

American actress and recording artist (1888–1946)

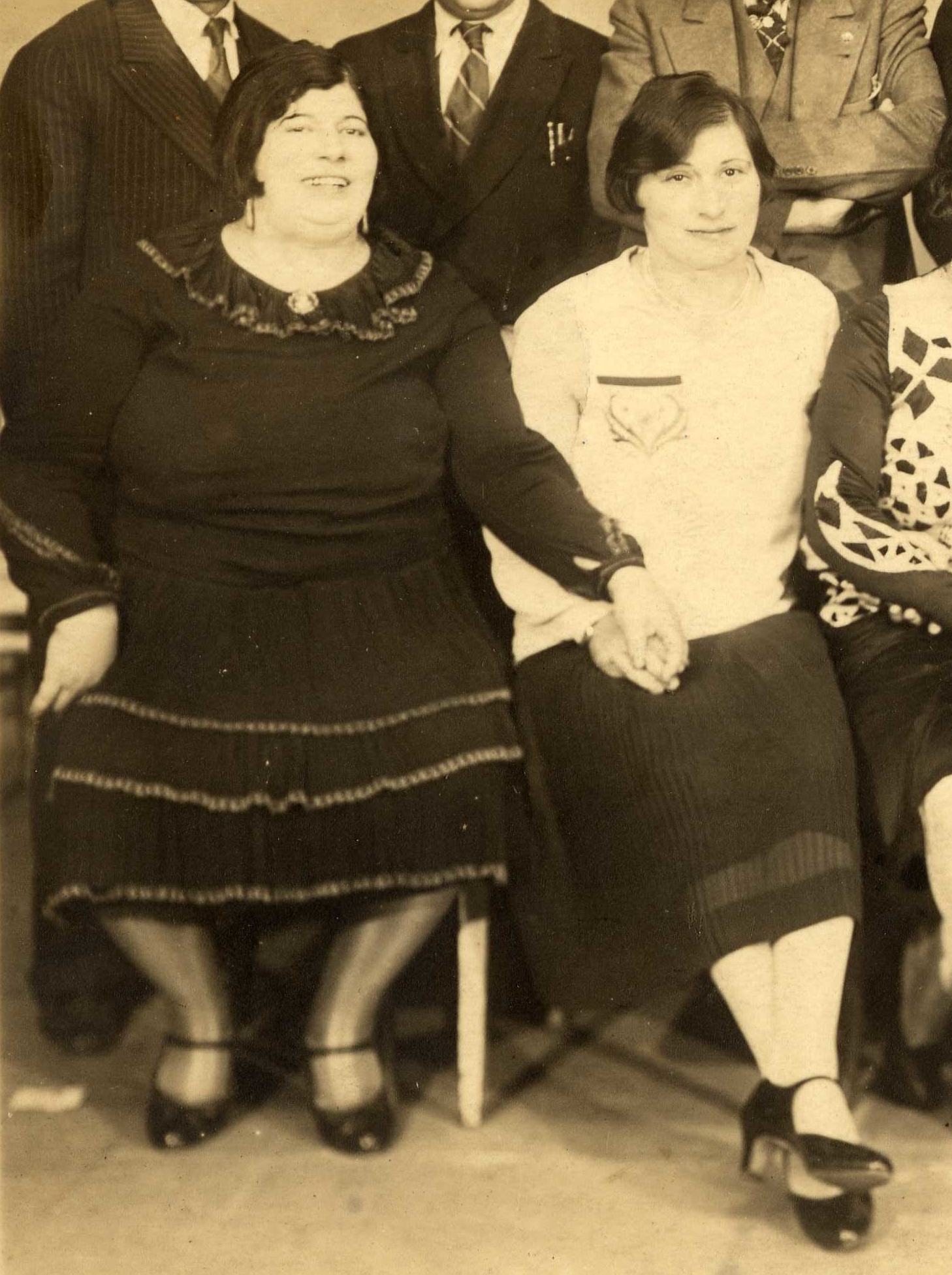
Clara Gold (left) and Bertha Gutentag with Liberty Theatre troupe circa 1927–8

Clara Gold (Yiddish: קלאַראַ גאָלד, 1888–1946) was an American Yiddish theatre actor and recording artist. She recorded more than twenty Yiddish theatre music and comedy discs between 1917 and 1929, usually with comedic partner Gus Goldstein.

== Biography ==
Gold was born in New York City in 1888. Her father was a house painter. Not long after she was born, the entire family moved back to Lemberg, Austria-Hungary (today Lviv, Ukraine). The family returned to the United States when she was thirteen.

She got her start in acting as a chorus girl in the Windsor Theater. She then became a Vaudeville and variety artist at various venues and music halls in New York. When she entered the actor's union she became a character actor on the mainstream Yiddish stage in New York and Philadelphia, including at the Liberty Theatre with Julius Adler and later Anshel Schorr, at the Prospect Theater, and at the Lyric Theatre. According to Pesach Burstein, Gold was illiterate and memorized all of her lines by ear before any new performance.

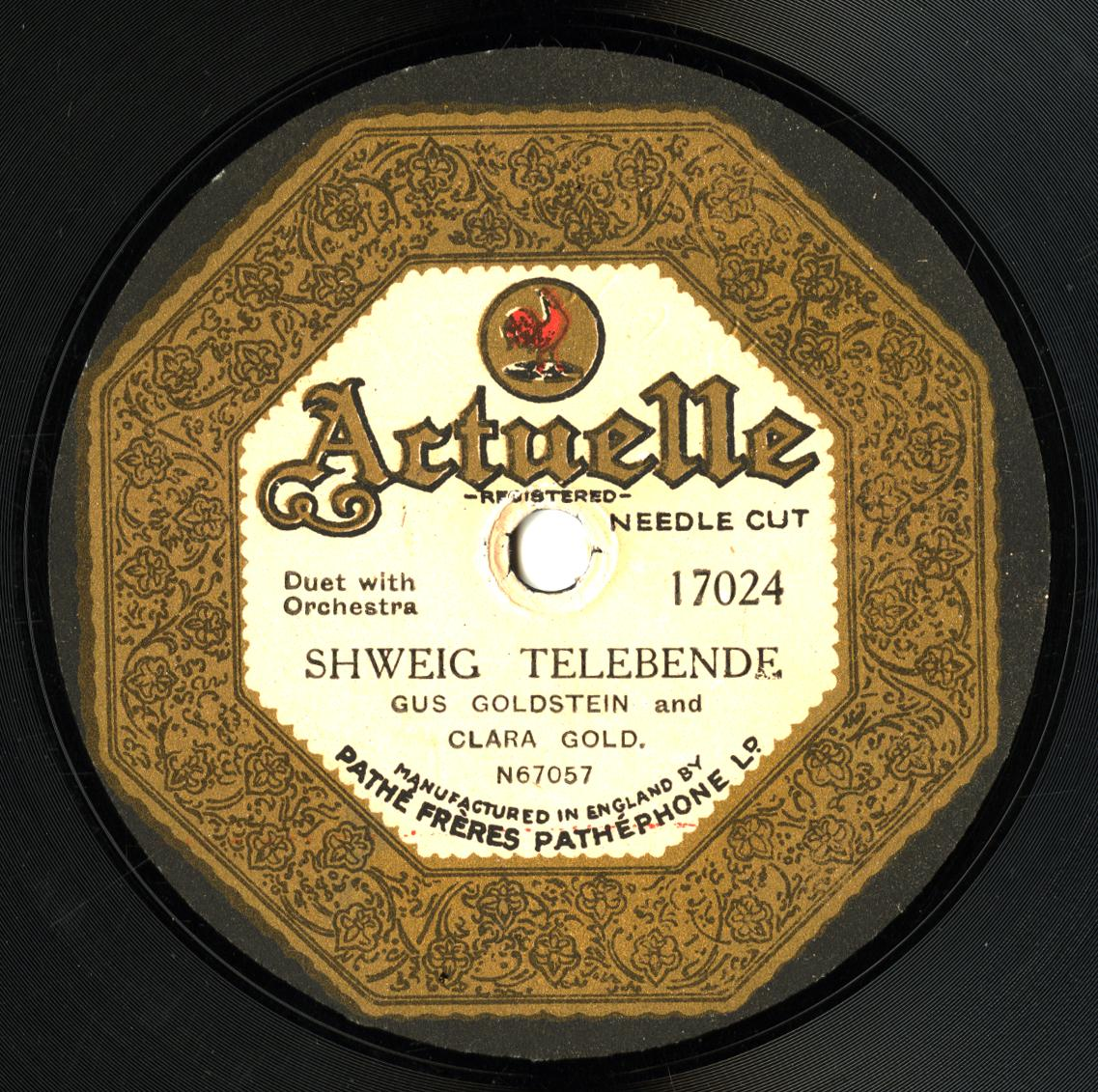
Shweig Telebende disc label c.1924

In 1916 she was invited to Victor Records to make test recordings for them as a solo singer; the disc was not released but she was soon invited back. Starting in 1917, she started making Yiddish-language comedy and theatre discs for Victor and also for Columbia Records. Most of her early recordings were made with actor Gus Goldstein and consisted of scenes featuring the popular Yente Telebende character (the source of the term Yenta, and a character which had previously been played by Bina Abramowitz). In 1919 she also recorded some Yiddish songs arranged by the Klezmer recording artist Israel J. Hochman. In 1922 and 1923 she then made a series of discs with OKeh Records, including some with Goldstein and some as a solo singer. Her final recordings seem to have been with Victor Records in July 1929.

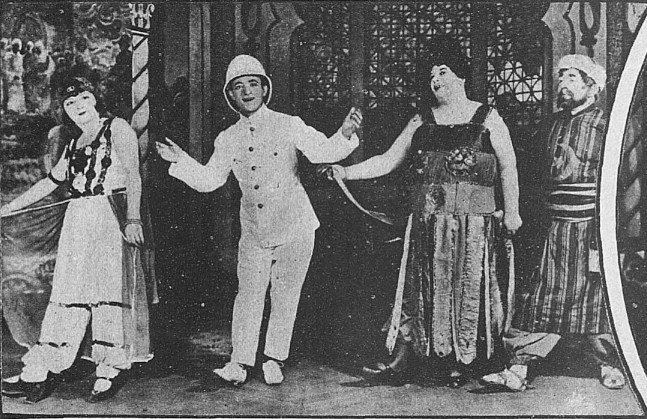
Clara (2nd from right) in a 1925 production of Student Love

In the 1930s, after the general collapse of the recording industry due to the Great Depression, she continued to act on the Yiddish stage. She was in a production at with Nellie Casman at the Odeon Theatre on Clinton Street in 1930. She performed for a time in Detroit in 1931. She was a regular cast member at the Liberty Theater once again under Louis Birnbaum starting in 1932. During the late 1930s and early 1940s she often performed in supporting roles at the Hopkinson Theatre in Brooklyn. She continued to appear on stage during and after the war; her final appearances seem to have been at the Bronx Art Theatre in fall 1946 in Anna Chernak and Sophie Geby's "The Woman that God Forgot".

She died on December 12, 1946. She was buried in the Yiddish Theatrical Alliance section at Mount Hebron Cemetery in Flushing, Queens.
