= Aleksotas Eldership =

Aleksotas
- Eldership
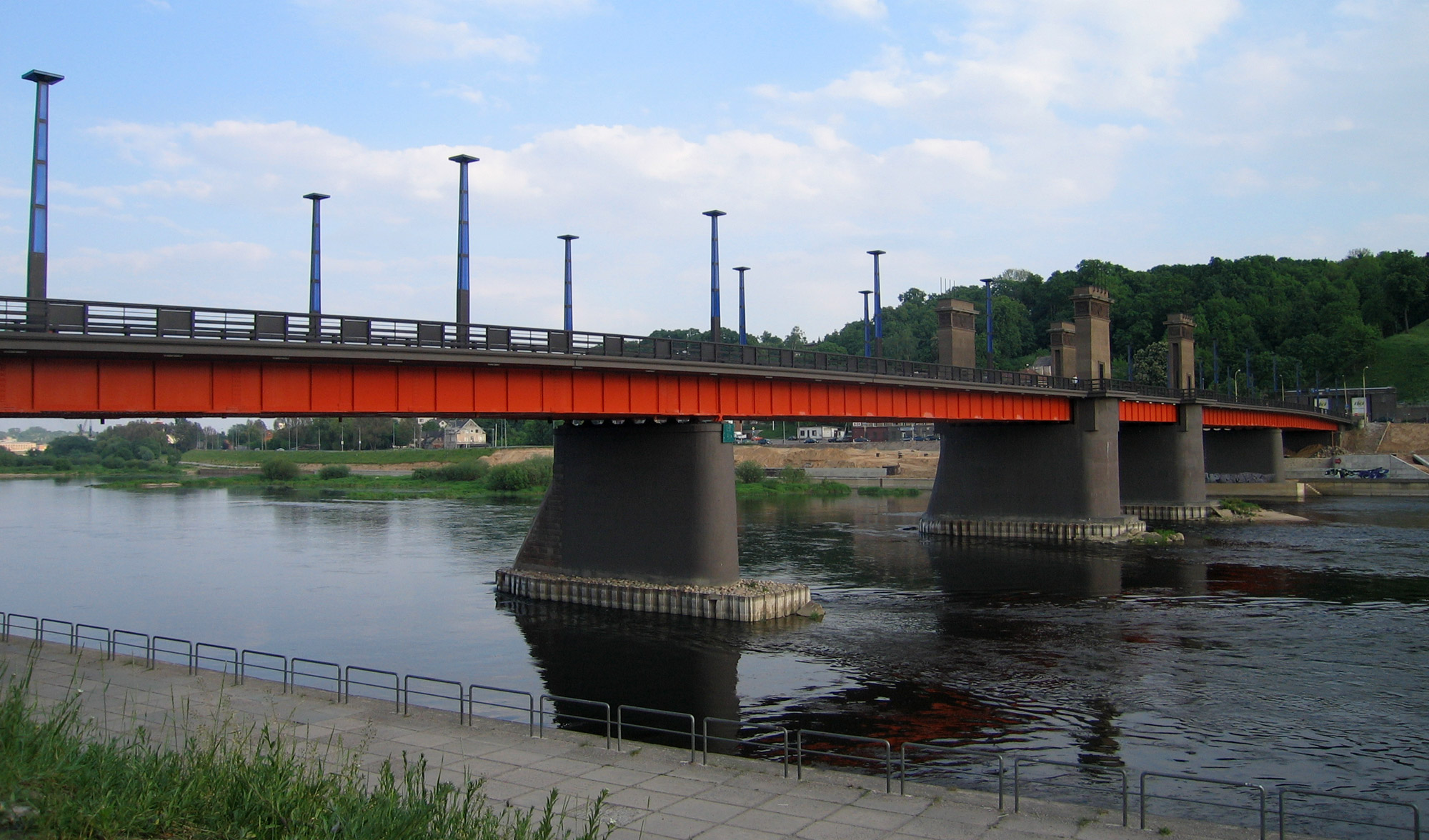
- Vytautas the Great Bridge with view of Aleksotas hill

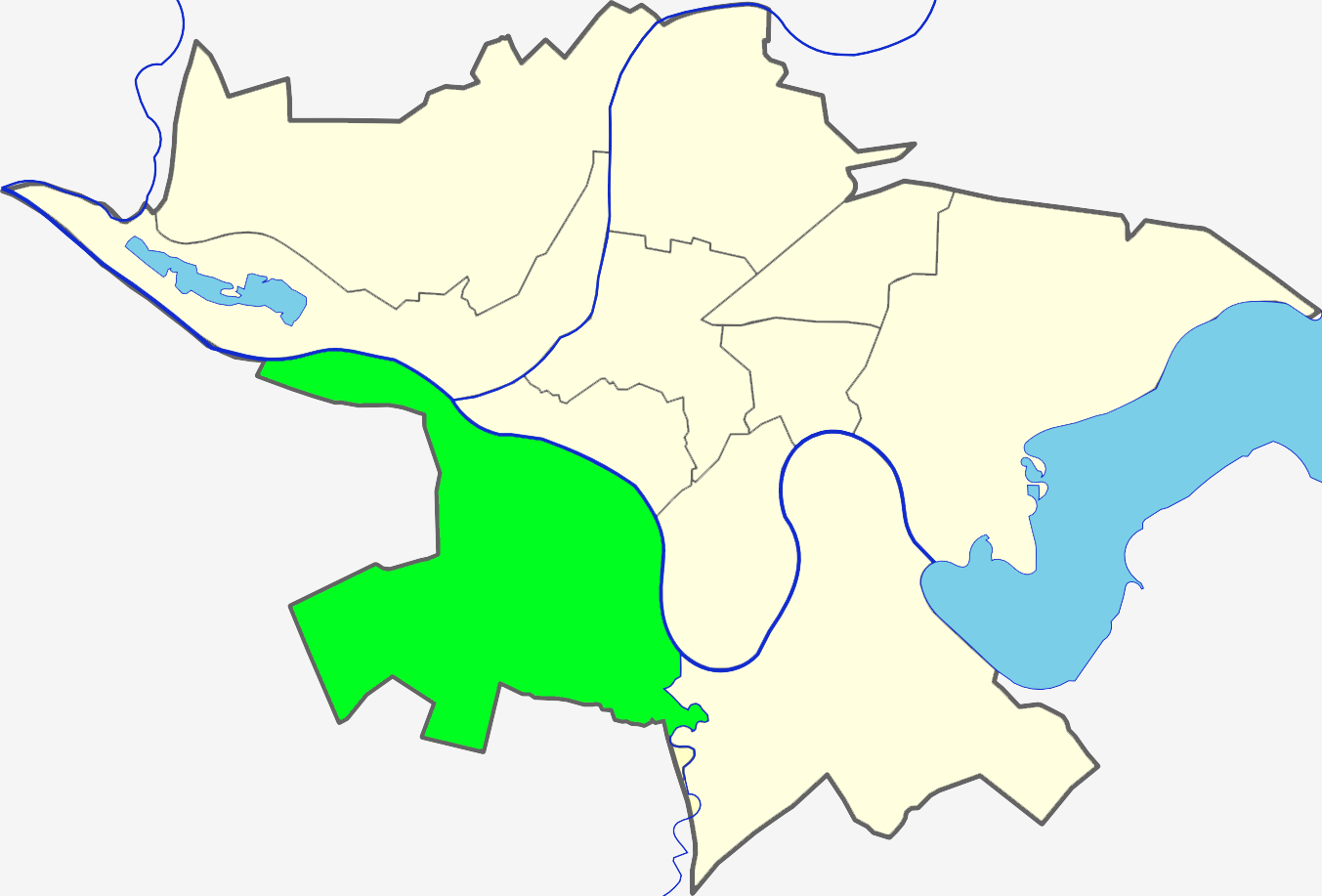
- Location of Aleksotas within Kaunas
- Coordinates: 54°53′N 23°54′E
- Country: Lithuania
- County: Kaunas County
- Municipality: Kaunas city municipality

Area
  - Total: 24 km^{2} (9.3 sq mi)

Population (2021)
  - Total: 21,390
  - Density: 890/km^{2} (2,300/sq mi)
- Time zone: UTC+2 (EET)
  - Summer (DST): UTC+3 (EEST)

The Aleksotas Eldership (Lithuanian: Aleksoto Seniunija) is an eldership in the southern section of the city of Kaunas, Lithuania, bordering the left bank of the Nemunas River. Its population in 2006 was 21,694. The elderate borders Vilijampolė and Centras in the north, Šančiai and Panemunė in the east, Garliava in the south as well as Akademija in the west.

== History ==
There is evidence that during pre-Christian times a pagan shrine was located here. The suburb was founded in 1408, when Vytautas the Great granted the woods that stood here to the city of Kaunas. Until the 16th century it was called Svirbigala, derived from the rivulet Svirbė. The name Aleksotas was used from the 16th century on, and is thought to be derived from the word aleksotai (shipyards) since many Nemunas River transport operations were located there. After the final Partition of the Polish-Lithuanian Commonwealth in 1795, Aleksotas, unlike most of Lithuania, became part of Prussia, until 1807 when Napoleon incorporated it into the Duchy of Warsaw. The village became part of the Kingdom of Poland in 1815. During November Uprising (1830–1831) the insurgent forces used Aleksota hill as artillery post to attack Kaunas, and eventually took the city. In December 1863, large January Uprising forces gathered here, hoping to be able to free Antanas Mackevičius, one of the uprising leaders in Lithuania, who was held imprisoned in Kaunas Old Town, although the attack never happened.

In 1864, it became part of the Russian Empire. However, it retained its old laws (the Napoleonic Code) and persisted in using the Gregorian calendar. A popular joke at the time had it that the Aleksotas bridge was the longest in the world, because it took twelve days to cross (i.e. the difference between the Gregorian and Julian calendars). It was a centre of Marijampolė Uyezd.

In 1918, independent Lithuania was re-established and Aleksotas became an integral part of it. The suburb grew rapidly in the 1920s, after Kaunas became the temporary capital of Lithuania. In 1931 it officially became a part of the City of Kaunas. From 1920 to 1940 many houses, shops, sawmills, and flour mills were built in Aleksotas. Its commercial and industrial facilities included grain storage houses, a glass factory, an Aleksotas Funicular Railway, the first bridge across the Nemunas, and the international S. Darius and S. Girėnas airport. The Physics and Chemistry Institute of Vytautas Magnus University was located here before being destroyed during World War II. The area suffered much damage during World War II. Kaunas Botanical Garden is located in the elderate.

The M. K. Čiurlionis Bridge and Vytautas the Great Bridge link the district to the centre and the old town.

== Notable residents ==
- Oskar Minkowski, diabetes research pioneer
- Hermann Minkowski, mathematician, creator of Minkowski space
- Ona Juodytė-Chadaravičienė, actress
- Wiktor Sukiennicki, Polish lawyer and historian.
- Yente Serdatzky (1877–1962), Yiddish-language writer
