= Žaliakalnis Funicular =

Funicular railway in Kaunas, Lithuania

Coordinates: 54°54′03″N 23°55′03″E

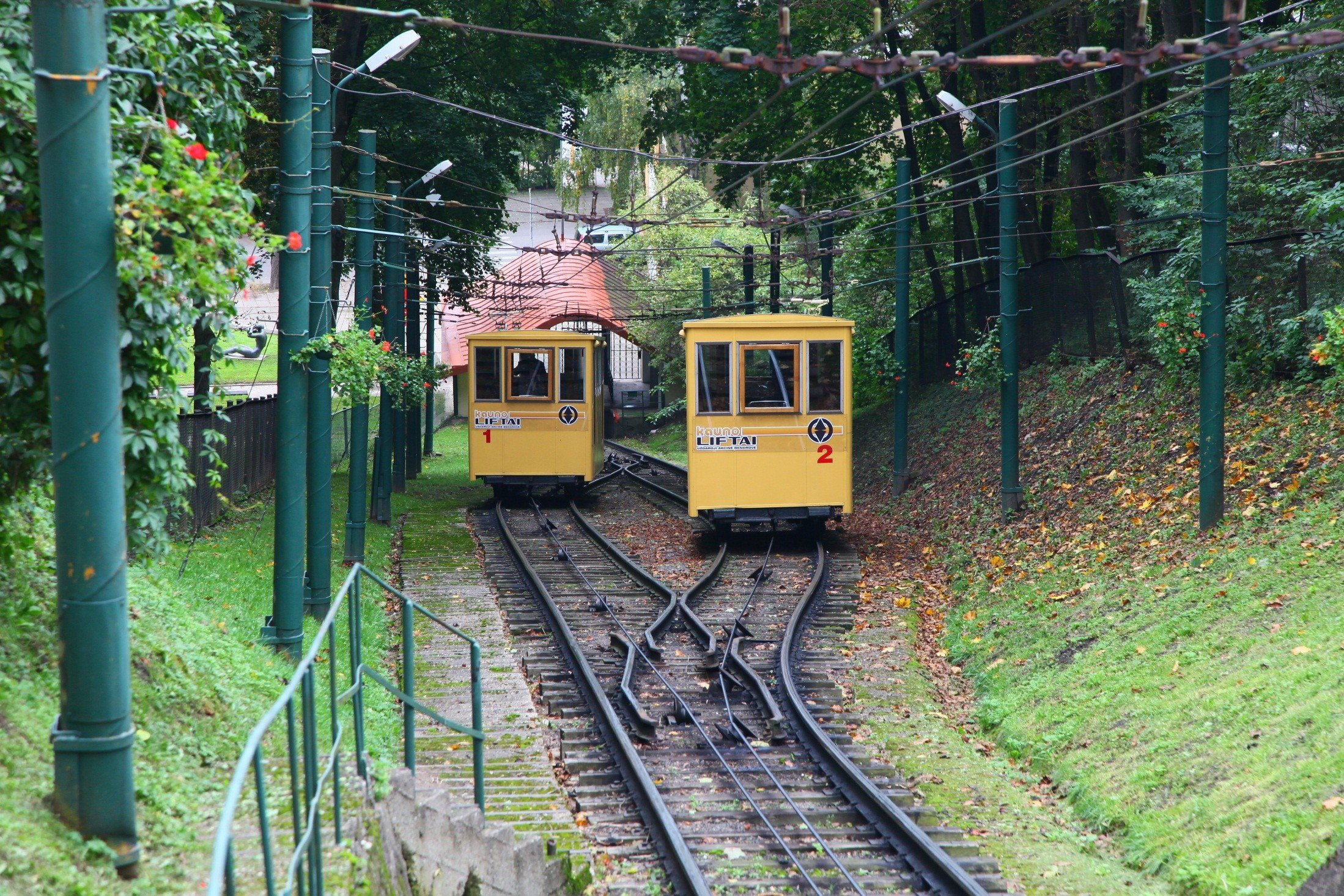
- View from the upper station

Overview
- Status: In service
- Locale: Kaunas
- Stations: 2
- Website: kaunoliftai.lt/funikulierius/

Service
- Type: Funicular
- Services: 1
- Operator(s): UAB „Kauno Autobusai“
- Rolling stock: 2

History
- Opened: 1931

Technical
- Line length: 142 m (466 ft)
- Number of tracks: 1 (excluding one passing loop)
- Track gauge: 1,200 mm (3 ft 11 1/4 in)
- Operating speed: 2 m/s (4.5 mph)

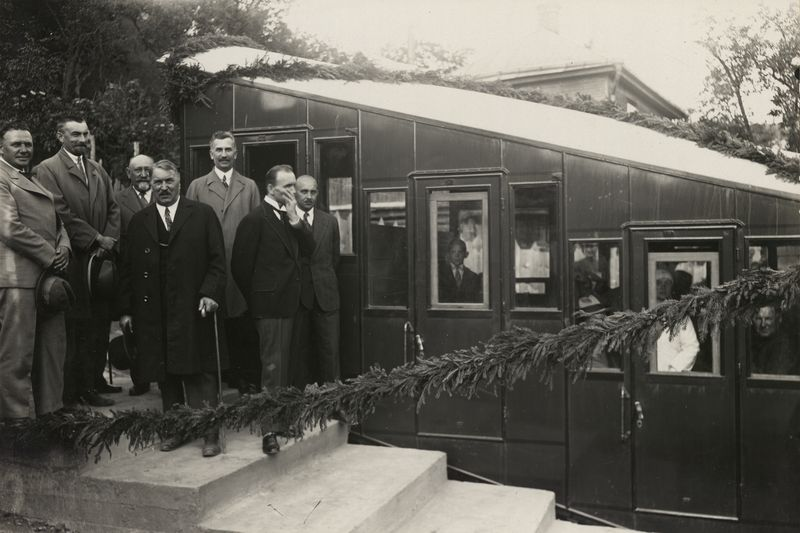
Opening ceremony of the Žaliakalnis Funicular Railway in 1931

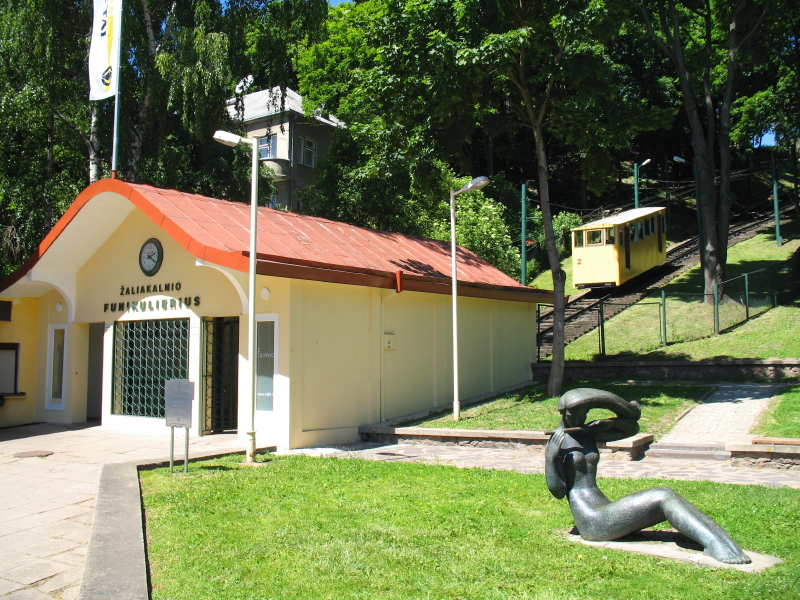
Lower station

Žaliakalnis Funicular (English: Green Hill Funicular) is a funicular railway in Kaunas, Lithuania. Built in 1931, it is the oldest funicular in Lithuania and is among the oldest vehicles of such type in the world still operational. The funicular is made of a wood-paneled coachwork and climbs 142 metres (466 ft) up from behind the Vytautas the Great War Museum to the Basilica of the Resurrection.

Upon the city council decision to improve the communication between the Žaliakalnis neighborhood with city center, the funicular was constructed by engineering firm Curt Rudolph Transportanlagen from Dresden, Germany with electrical equipment from AEG and mechanical parts from Bell Maschinenfabrik, Switzerland. The official opening was on 5 August 1931 with one passenger car, while the second car was only a platform ballasted with stones used to counterbalance the passenger car. The electric overhead power cable and the pantographs of the coaches are only used for lighting and heating of the cars. The upper station housed the electrically driven funicular mechanism in the basement, whilst the lower end of the line did not even have a shelter until 1932.

The funicular succeeded and became very popular transportation for the city inhabitants and guests. It is known that about 5 million passengers were moved using it between 1950 and 1970.

The funicular was renovated between 1935 and 1937. New, larger cars with car bodies from Napoleonas Dobkevičius on underframes from Bell Maschinenfabrik were built, and the lower station was given a proper building.

The Žaliakalnis Funicular Railway was included in the Registry of Immovable Cultural Heritage Sites of the Republic of Lithuania in 1993.

In 2015, the funicular was one of 44 objects in Kaunas to receive the European Heritage Label.

== See also ==
- Aleksotas Funicular Railway completed in Kaunas in 1935
- List of funicular railways
