= Yente Serdatzky =

Russian-born American Yiddish-language writer (1877–1962)

Yenta Serdatzky
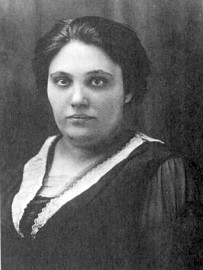
- Born: Yente Raybman; September 15, 1877; Aleksotas, Lithuania
- Died: May 1, 1962 (aged 84)
- Other names: Yenta Serdatsky, Yente Sardatsky, Yenta Serdatski, Jente Serdatzky

Yente Serdatzky (also Serdatsky and Sardatsky; Yiddish: יענטע סערדאַצקי; September 15, 1877 – May 1, 1962) was a Russian-born American Yiddish-language writer of short fiction and plays, active in New York City.

== Early life ==
Serdatzky was born on 15 September 1877 as Yente Raybman in Aleksotas (Aleksat), near Kovno (Kaunas), Lithuania (then in Kovno Governorate, Russian Empire), the daughter of a used furniture dealer who was also a scholar. She received a secular as well as a basic Jewish education, and learned German, Russian, and Hebrew. The family home was a gathering place for Yiddish writers around Kovno, including Avrom Reyzen, and in this way she became acquainted with contemporary Yiddish literature.

== Career ==
Serdatzky worked in a spice shop and ran a grocery store as a young woman. In 1905, the year of the Russian Revolution, she left her family and moved to Warsaw, to pursue her writing. There she joined the literary circle around I. L. Peretz. She had her literary debut with the story "Mirl," published in the Yiddish daily newspaper Der Veg (The Way), of which Peretz was the literary editor. Peretz supported her work, and published further writings by Serdatsky.

In 1906, reunited with her family, Serdatzky emigrated to the United States. After living initially in Chicago, she settled in New York City, where she ran a soup kitchen on the city's Lower East Side. She published short stories, sketches, and one-act plays in Yiddish periodicals including Fraye arbeter shtime (Free Voice of Labor), Fraye gezelshaft (Free Society), Tsukunft (Future), Dos naye Land (The New Land), and Fraynd (Friend). She also published stories regularly in the Forverts (The Forward), and became a contributing editor there.

In 1922, following a disagreement over payment with Forverts editor Abraham Cahan, Serdatzky was dismissed from the staff, though her demands for payment (and the magazine's refusal) dragged into the mid-1930s. She dropped out of the literary scene for years, and supported herself in part by renting rooms. Much later in her life, from 1949 to 1955, she published over 30 stories in Isaac Liebman's Nyu-yorker vokhnblat (New York weekly paper).

Serdatzky's only book publication was Geklibene shriftn (Collected writings), published in New York by the Hebrew Publishing Company, in 1913.

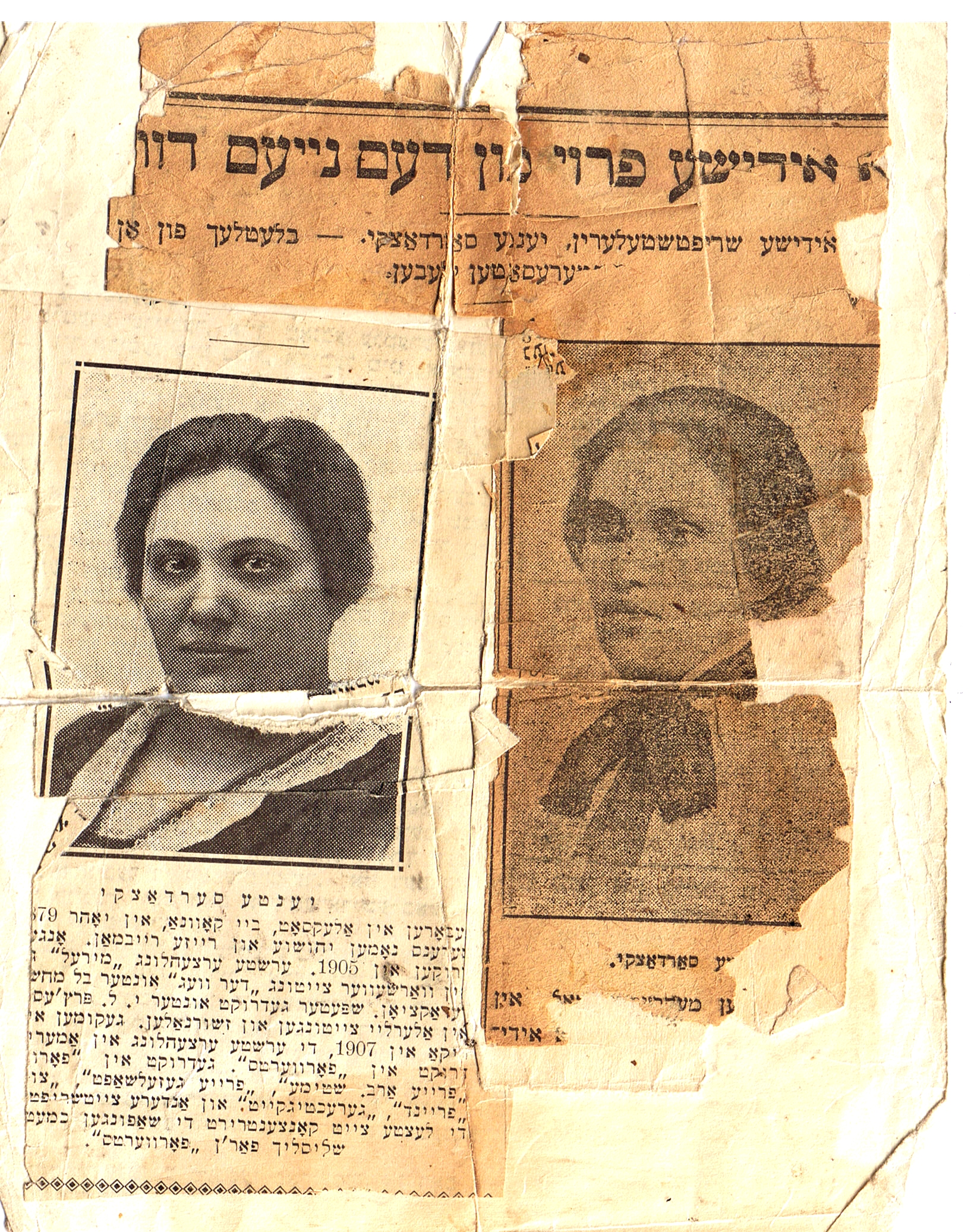
(Untranslated) newspaper clippings about Serdastsky.

== Literary works ==
Yente Serdatzky's literary work was carried out in relation to the social and political upheavals that shaped the writer's own life and informed her approach to literature. Serdatzky's stories engage with topics such as immigrant life, Jewish tradition, the oppression women face in traditional family structures, and the role of women in socialist movements. Much of Serdatzky's work is not collected or anthologized. Her Collected Writings (געקליבענע שריפֿטען) anthology, published in 1913, does not include the pieces that Serdatzky wrote in New York between 1914 and 1922 – the year that she lost access to publishing due to a feud with Abraham Cahan, editor of the Forverts – or any of the work published between 1949 and 1955. This is the only existing Yiddish-language compilation of Serdatzky's work.

Two stories, taken from two distinct periods in Yente Serdatzky's career – "Mirl" (1905) and "Confession" (1913) – serve as particularly illustrative examples of the themes that permeate Serdatzky's work. "Mirl," a semi-autobiographical story written before Serdatzky's immigration to the United States, shows how a young Jewish woman's exposure to socialist ideals opens her eyes to the oppressiveness of her family life, compelling her to seek intellectual freedom in an urban environment that ultimately cannot provide her with the rewarding relationships she craves. "Confession," written long after Serdatzky's immigration to the United States, also questions whether existing political paradigms can meet the needs of women in a manner that provides them with both fulfillment and stability, even as they center the concerns of men. "Confession" transfers Serdatzky's earliest reflections, which appear in "Mirl", to the New York context, by considering how left-wing movements subordinate immigrant women, who are especially susceptible to violence.

Yente Serdatzky's first published story, “Mirl,” thematically parallels the author's personal trajectory as a wife, mother, and revolutionary thinker who left her family and husband in 1905 to pursue her literary career in Warsaw. This story is about a working-class Jewish woman named Mirl, who becomes a wife at eighteen years old to Shmuel, a laborer who is active in left-wing political circles. Before narrating the story of Mirl's life, Serdatzky describes Mirl as the winner of a war, as she has successfully moved to the city of V. after a long struggle. The concept of war becomes a thread throughout the rest of the story. On the one hand, this theme can be understood in the context of the 1905 Russian revolution, which took place in the year that this text was published. On the other, this theme speaks to the battle that takes place within Mirl herself, as she seeks to negotiate her conflicting positions as wife, mother, and intellectual in an environment that stifles her talent. As a young girl, Mirl trusts that her marriage to Shmuel will provide her with a way out of her parents’ home, which is described as a suffocatingly crowded space that restricts her expression and movement alike. Mirl dreams of fully participating in the emerging leftist political conversations that take place between Shmuel and his friends, which she believes are capable of establishing a new, free world.

In spite of her aspirations, the realities of marriage and family life do not allow Mirl to develop her intellectual sensibilities alongside her husband as she dreamed. Since Shmuel does not earn much money as a laborer, Mirl has to devote herself completely to her home and children. While Mirl tries to only think of her family obligations, she is unable to suppress her desire for intellectual stimulation and leaves her family for the city after six years of joyless marriage. However, her life in the city is complicated by the fact that she frequently relocates apartments because she cannot tolerate the sense of alienation that she feels when she sees happy families. Her first landlady speaks about her love for her dead husband and children who live outside of the city. Mirl is unable to connect to the landlady's tender love for her familial memories, as she believes that her children's awareness of her resentment caused them to detest her. After Mirl moves to a new apartment, she nostalgically remembers her own children's faces when she gazes at the landlady's children. Although she tries to turn to her books to distract herself, Mirl cannot focus on reading as she watches the loving interactions between a couple next door and misses Shmuel. She cannot articulate precisely why she felt hatred for her husband and children when she was living with them, but feels that Shmuel poses a barrier to her life path that she had to overcome. Finally, Mirl moves to an apartment owned by a spinster. Although she thinks that this setting will allow her to stop reflecting on her family and dedicate herself to her writing, she fears the loneliness that she senses in the spinster's eyes. For this reason, she starts to look for a new apartment. At the end of the story, Mirl is still incapable of reading her books and does not have a stable residence. She is not able to reconcile her desire to create art with the burden of unfair familial expectations that her intellectual awakening has made her understand and hate. At the same time, she longs for deep relationships with her husband and children that mirror those she encounters in the city. Mirl can be read as the story in which Serdatzky integrates experiences from her own life and the lives of women like her into her work for the first time. This text provides the groundwork for her lifelong attention to the tension between love and intellectual liberation that her fellow female activists confronted.

While Serdatzky wrote "Mirl" prior to her immigration to the United States, "Confession" [װידױ] was published in 1913, years after her immigration to New York, in her Collected Writings [געקליבענע שריפֿטען] anthology. "Confession" marks another phase of Serdatzky's literary production and personal life, in which the transformative revolutionary events that took place in Europe and shaped the idealistic aspirations of the protagonist in "Mirl" are integrated into the life history of the politically disillusioned protagonist in "Confession," who cannot reconcile her desire for love with the harsh reality of life as a working-class immigrant in New York. In terms of its form, "Confession" contrasts with "Mirl" in a significant way, as it structurally and thematically draws upon the connotations of the Hebrew word וִדּוּי, referring to the act of confession in the Jewish religion. Unlike "Mirl," which is focused on the interior life of a single woman, "Confession" recounts the story of a meeting between the narrator and the woman who orally reconstructs the story of her life before her chosen audience. The text takes the form of a monologue given by Mary Rubin, a Jew from Poland who grew up in the former Pale of Settlement and immigrated to New York to escape political persecution after the 1905 Russian revolution. This monologue, or confession, is observed by the narrator (Serdatzky), who is unexpectedly invited to a conversation in Rubin's apartment. While the narrator quietly hopes that she will be met by a relative who will bestow an inheritance on her, she encounters Rubin, a sick woman who feels compelled to confide in her before she dies.

Born into poverty, Rubin had to work from the age of twelve and started to contribute to socialist actions in the years preceding the 1905 Russian revolution. Due to the threat of arrest in light of her forbidden political activities in the Pale, Rubin followed her brothers to America. After her friends marry her intended suitors, Rubin spends years looking for a husband in New York, without success. Rubin describes herself as an enthusiastic reader of romantic stories written in Yiddish who is uninterested in political philosophy, unlike the narrator. A fight between the narrator and Rubin erupts when Rubin admits to going to political meetings in New York with the sole purpose of finding a husband, which the narrator views as a betrayal of the socialist cause. After this disagreement, Rubin admits her desperation for romantic love, which led her to consider having a sexual relationship with a stranger so that she could raise a child by herself. Rubin ultimately retreats from this possibility, choosing to visit to a friend in another city who introduces her to an intellectual named Hyman. While her friend tells her that Hyman has a history of abandoning his girlfriends, Rubin believes in the authenticity of his love for her and supports him financially, in accordance with the changing expectations of women and labor advanced by the socialist thinkers surrounding her. However, Hyman leaves Rubin for another woman in the midst of her illness. At the end of the confession, Rubin asks the narrator what will become of her female friends, as she worries that their destitution might lead them to prostitution or render them vulnerable to other types of sexual exploitation. While a wealthy woman and her friends provide for Rubin as an act of charity, she remains terrified of the economic and social conditions that threaten to consume the lives of immigrants like her. Among other themes, this story exposes how women like Rubin are excluded from the intellectual milieu in New York and exploited by the activists who sideline their concerns.

After publishing "Confession," Serdatzky continued to write stories and plays primarily about immigrant women. As scholars have explained, the Yiddish poet Yankev Glatshteyn argued that the perception of Serdatzky as "angry" led to a lamentable lack of serious engagement with her work and resulted in the financial problems that plagued her life. In "Mirl," "Confession," and her later works, Serdatzky channels women's anger by providing the reader with an understanding of the political, religious, and economic circumstances that disproportionately affected women. At the same time, the testimonial form of stories like "Confession" suggests that storytelling and community between women might provide a path forward.

== Critical reception ==
Abraham Cahan described Serdatzky in 1914 as a successful writer of "tales of real life." The characters in her fiction are often women like herself, immigrants and intellectuals, inspired by left-wing political ideals, while facing disappointment in their everyday lives and relationships. Her stories at times convey a sense of "pervasive loneliness." She was called "The Queen of Union Square" by essayist Sh. Tennenbaum in 1969. Interest in her work revived in the 1990s, and her work remains a topic of interest among feminist scholars of Yiddish literature, and scholars of American immigrant literature and culture.

== Personal life ==
Serdatsky married and had three children. At least three of her sisters also lived in the United States by 1952: Mary Press in Chicago, Yetta Chesney in Los Angeles, and Mollie Hirsch. She died in 1962, aged 85 years.

== Translated works ==
Works by Serdatzky appear in translation in several English-language anthologies:

- Serdatzky, Yente (2001) [1910–1922]. "Unchanged". In Chametzky, Jules; Felstiner, John; Flanzbaum, Hilene; Hellerstein, Kathryn (eds.). Jewish American Literature: A Norton Anthology. W. W. Norton & Company. pp. 150–154. ISBN 9780393048094.
- ——————— (2015) [May 16–17, 1912]. "A Simkhe" [A Celebration]. In Wishnia, Kenneth (ed.). Jewish Noir: Contemporary Tales of Crime and Other Dark Deeds. Translated by Wishnia, Kenneth; Wishnia, Arnold. PM Press. pp. 130–141. ISBN 9781629631578.
- ——————— (2007) [1913]. "Rosh Hashanah". In Bark, Sandra (ed.). Beautiful as the Moon, Radiant as the Stars: Jewish Women in Yiddish Stories – An Anthology. Translated by Cassedy, Ellen. Grand Central Publishing. pp. 157–173. ISBN 9780446510363.
- ——————— (2016) [June 6, 1920]. "The Devoted Cousin". In Glinter, Ezra (ed.). Have I Got a Story for You: More Than a Century of Fiction from The Forward. Translated by Kirzane, Jessica. W. W. Norton & Company. pp. 97–102. ISBN 9780393254853.
- ——————— (2016) [August 1, 1921]. "The Young Widow". In Glinter, Ezra (ed.). Have I Got a Story for You: More Than a Century of Fiction from The Forward. Translated by Kirzane, Jessica. W.W. Norton & Company. pp. 102–107. ISBN 9780393254853.
- ——————— (2016) [January 9, 1922]. "She Waits". In Glinter, Ezra (ed.). Have I Got a Story for You: More Than a Century of Fiction from The Forward. Translated by Kirzane, Jessica. W. W. Norton & Company. pp. 102–107. ISBN 9780393254853.
- (2023) "Unheard", trans. Dalia Wolfson, In Virginia's Sisters: An Anthology of Women's Writing, Aurora Metro Books. ISBN 9781912430789
