= Gus Goldstein =

American actor

- גוסטאַװ גאָלדשטײן
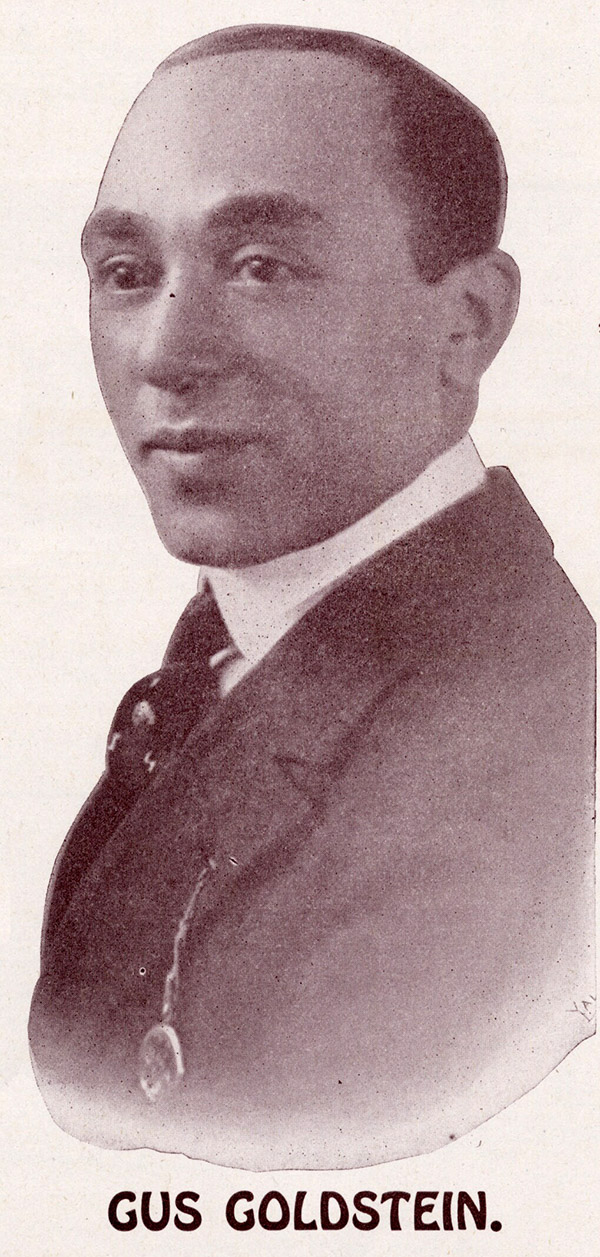
- Born: Gustave Goldstein; June 1, 1882; Iași, Romania
- Died: February 19, 1946 (aged 63); New York
- Occupations: Yiddish-language recording artist; vaudevillian

Gustave "Gus" Goldstein (Yiddish: גוסטאַװ גאָלדשטײן; c. 1882 – February 19, 1946) was a Romanian-born American Yiddish theatre actor, songwriter, vaudevillian, and recording artist. During the boom in Yiddish music recording in the 1910s and 1920s, he recorded dozens of 78-rpm discs of comedy and theatre music for Victor, Brunswick, Emerson, OKeh, and Columbia Records, collaborating with many celebrities of contemporary Jewish music such as Naftule Brandwein, Abe Schwartz, Louis Gilrod, and Clara Gold.

== Biography ==
Goldstein was born in Iași, Romania on June 1, 1882 (although the Leksikon fun yidishn teater gives the year as 1884). His father, Iancu Leib Goldstein, was a house painter, and his mother was named Rebecca (Rifke) Rappaport. Gustave showed an interest in performance and songwriting from a young age, and joined an amateur Yiddish theatre troupe at thirteen. At age fifteen he ran away to Czernowitz (today Chernivtsi in Ukraine) where he supported himself by singing his own compositions in taverns. He then left for Paris, where he performed on the Yiddish stage for a time. He emigrated to New York City, arriving in December 1902. He began to appear on Yiddish vaudeville stages there as well as in Yiddish theatre troupes. In March 1904 he was married to Yetta Plevner, a fellow Romanian Jewish immigrant.

He continued to write his own songs, couplets and skits, many of which were recorded during the boom in Yiddish-language recording of the 1910s. His earliest recordings seem to have been with Victor Records in early 1916; over the next decade he would record at least 70 sides with them, some with other Yiddish comedy figures such as Clara Gold or Anna Hoffman. These consisted of comedic skits, Yiddish theatre music, or imitations of scenes from Eastern European Jewish life involving Badchens and klezmers. His recurring characters Yente and Mendel were featured on many of the discs. His discs sold so well that he recorded for most of the major labels in the New York area. As early as 1917 he also started recording for Columbia Records, often with Clara Gold; that contract seems to have lasted until around 1923. In 1919–20 he recorded for Emerson Records's International division. In 1922 and 1923 he recorded another set of roughly 20 discs for Okeh Records. His final round of recording seems to have a handful of discs been for Brunswick Records in 1927 and 1928, including some records with Alexander Olshanetsky's orchestra. He was also involved in the business side of the record industry; he was assistant manager of foreign language content at Emerson Records in 1920 as well as at Cardinal Records in 1921.

After the collapse of the ethnic recording industry at the end of the 1920s, he returned to Yiddish vaudeville and worked as a singer and comedian during 1930s.

He died on February 19, 1946, in New York.
