= Yente (18th-century) =

Jewish spritiual Hasidic leader

Yente (18th century) was a possibly-legendary Jewish spiritual Hasidic leader. She wore the tallit.

According to legend, she was a disciple of Baal Shem Tov, who declared her to be a prophet. She became a figure of pilgrimage, to whom both men and women came and gave gifts in exchange for gifts and blessings.
