= Yentl en De Boer =

Yentl en de Boer
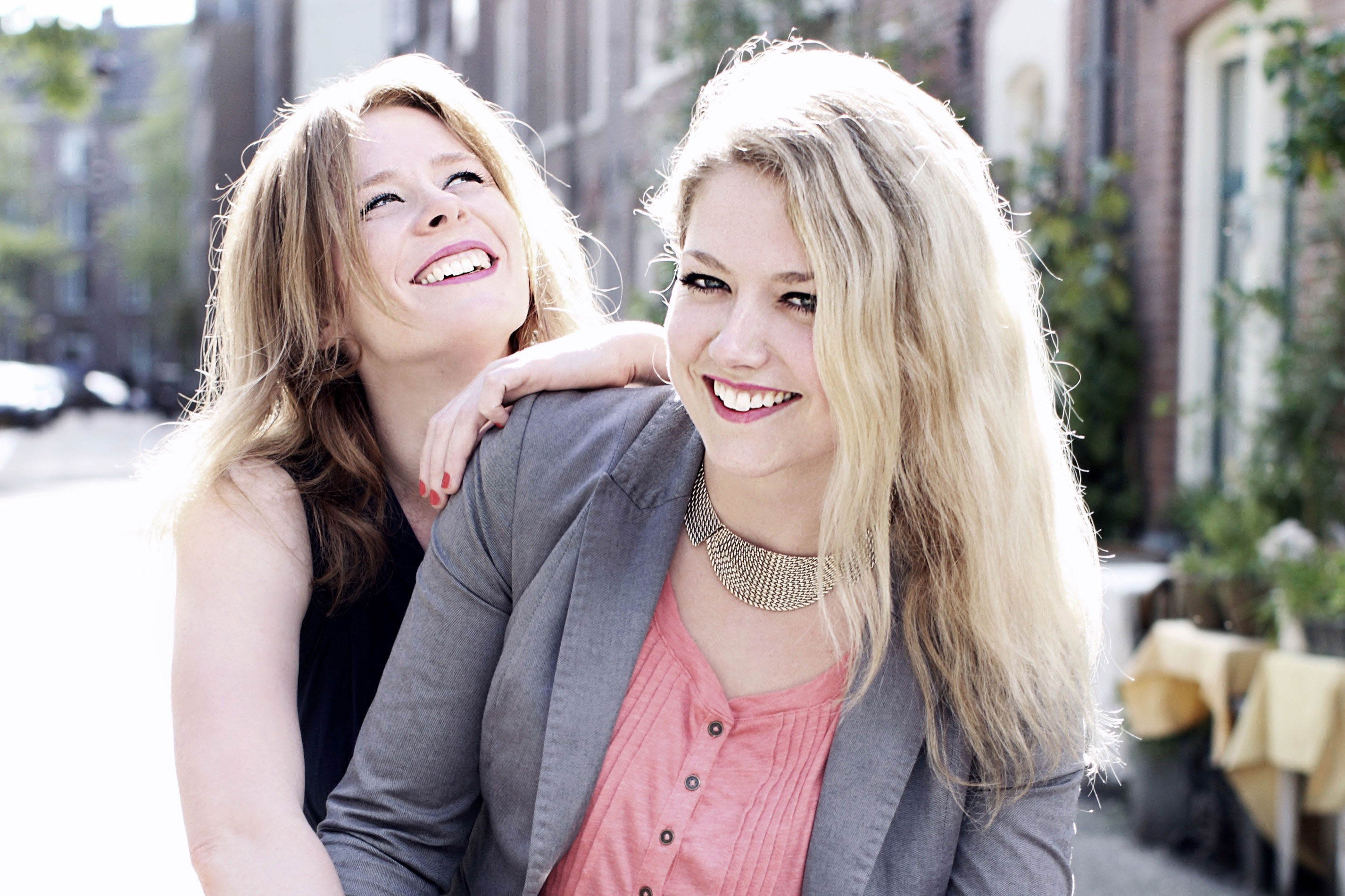
- Christine de Boer (left) and Yentl Schieman (right)

Background information
- Origin: Amsterdam, Netherlands
- Genres: Pop, comedy
- Years active: September 2012 – present
- Members: Yentl Schieman; Christine de Boer
- Website: www.yentlendeboer.nl

Yentl en de Boer is a Dutch cabaret and musical duo, consisting of Yentl Schieman and Christine de Boer. The duo received two Annie M.G. Schmidt Awards, awarded to the best theatrical song of the year: In 2014 for their song Ik heb een man gekend (I knew this guy) and in 2020 for Het is begonnen (It has begun). Earlier on in their career Yentl en de Boer were awarded with the Wim Sonneveld Award and the Audience Award during the Amsterdam Cabaret Festival 2013 (Amsterdams Kleinkunst Festival 2013). Yentl en de Boer are praised for their harmonious vocals and witty lyrics.

== Theatre ==
- 2010: Kom je op ons partijtje?
- 2012: Club Silenzio
- 2013: De Mensen
- 2013: Club Silenzio in SPACE
- 2014: Club Silenzio: The Final Quest
- 2014/2015: De Meisjes
- 2015-2017: De snoepwinkel is gesloten
- 2017/2018: Yentl en de Boer in Concert
- 2018-2019: Magie
- 2020-2022: De Kampvuursessies
- 2022-2024: Modderkruipers
- 2025-2026: Rekhalzen

== Awards ==
- 2012: Fringe Silver Award for Club Silenzio during the Amsterdam Fringe Festival
- 2013: Jury Award (Wim Sonneveld Award) and Audience Award for De Mensen during the Amsterdam Cabaret Festival
- 2015: Annie M.G. Schmidt Award 2014 for the lyrics, composition and performance of the song Ik heb een man gekend
- 2021: Annie M.G. Schmidt Award 2020 for the lyrics, composition and performance of the song Het is begonnen
- 2023: Poelifinario Kleinkunst, awarded to the best Dutch theatre show of the year: Modderkruipers

== Albums ==
- 2014: De Plaat (album)
- 2015: Ik heb een man gekend (single)
- 2016: M'n snoep: Live in Het Concertgebouw (album)
- 2018: Morph
- 2021: Yentl en de Boer de Serie (Music from the Original TV Series) (soundtrackalbum)
- 2022: De Kampvuursessies Live (album)
- 2024: Alles is nog mogelijk (album)
- 2026: De dagen (album)

== See also ==
- Music of the Netherlands
