= Vytautas the Great Bridge =

Bridge in Kaunas, Lithuania

Coordinates: 54°53′37″N 23°53′13″E

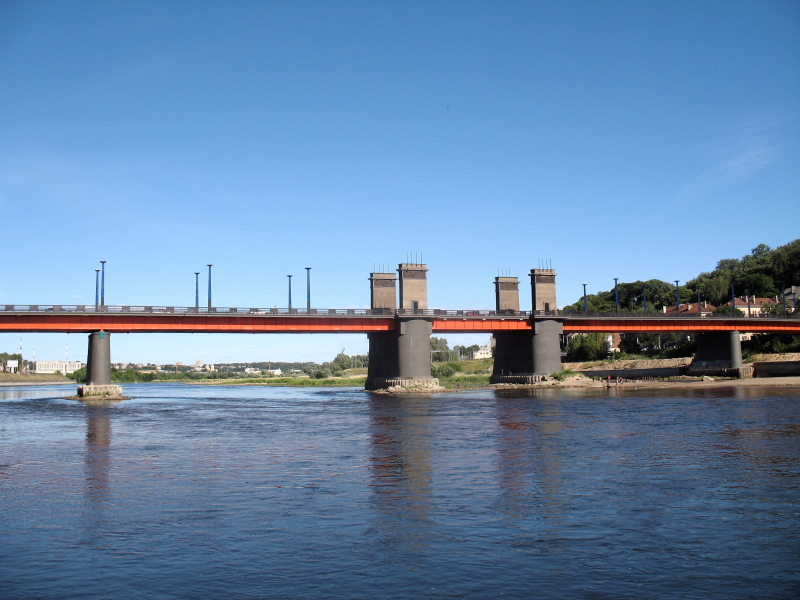
Vytautas the Great Bridge

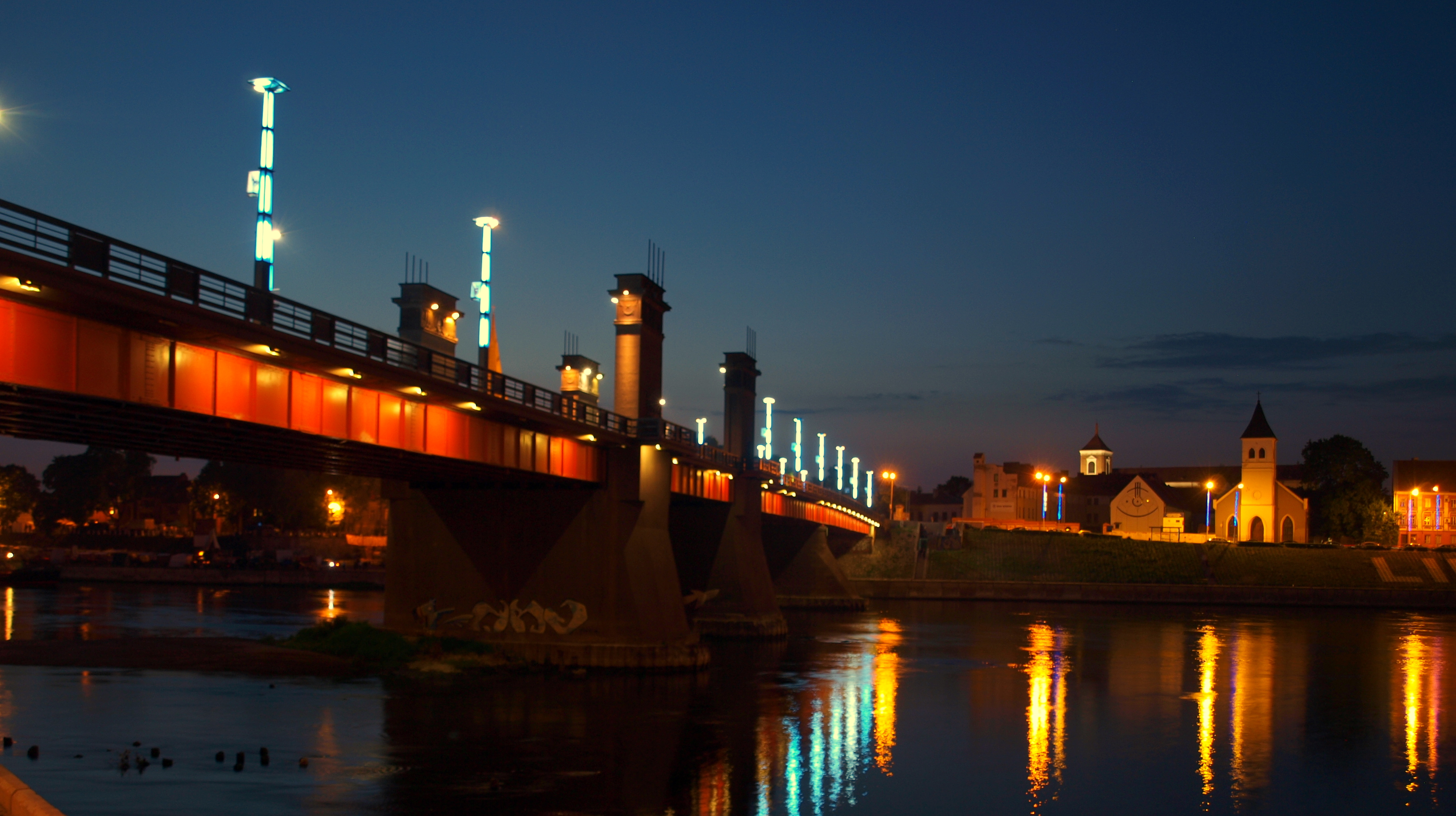
Vytautas the Great Bridge at night

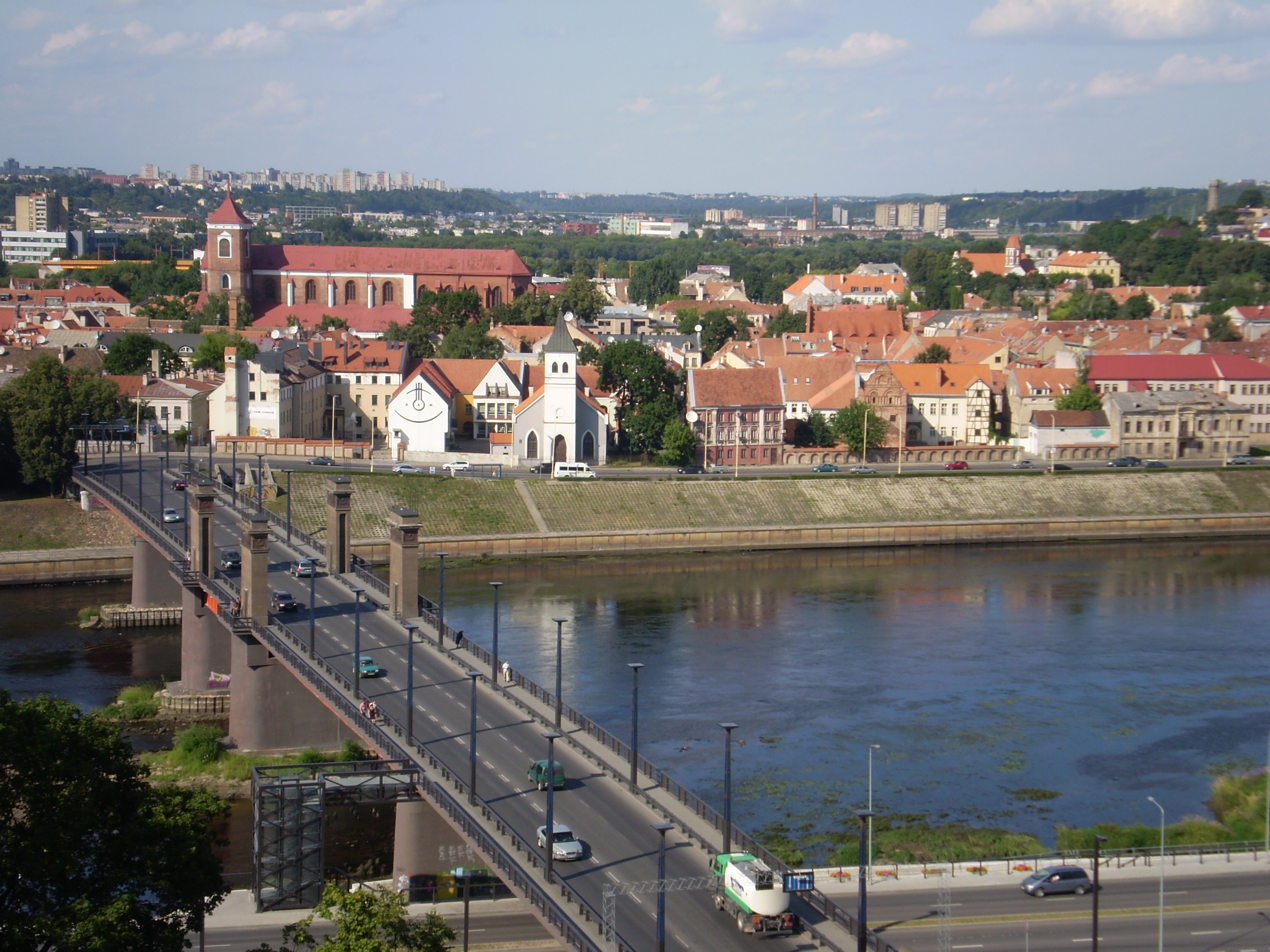
Vytautas the Great Bridge in 2009

Vytautas the Great Bridge, also known as Aleksotas Bridge before 1930 and from 1940 until 23 February 2008, crosses the Nemunas River to connect Aleksotas and Old Town in Kaunas, Lithuania. Its length exceeds 256 meters, and its width is of 16 meters. The means of payment for the building of the bridge was arranged back in 1927. After several stages of competition, Copenhagen-based engineers obtained the rights to build the bridge. Finally, on January 11, 1930, the bridge was completed being named after Grand Duke of Lithuania Vytautas the Great.

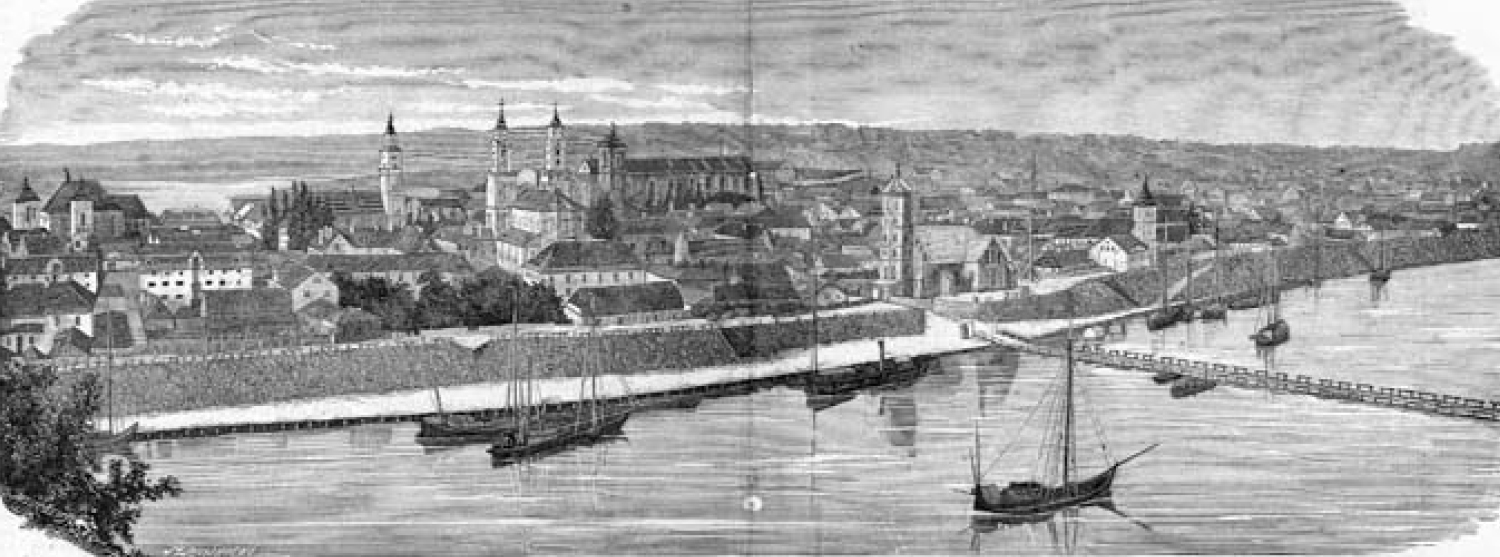
Pontoon bridge in 1873

During World War II, the bridge was blown up twice. Due to the strategic relevance of the city Kaunas, the bridge was rebuilt in 1948 by architect Levas Kazarinskis. In 2005 the bridge underwent a major reconstruction.
