= Yentl Schieman =

Dutch actress, singer and comedian

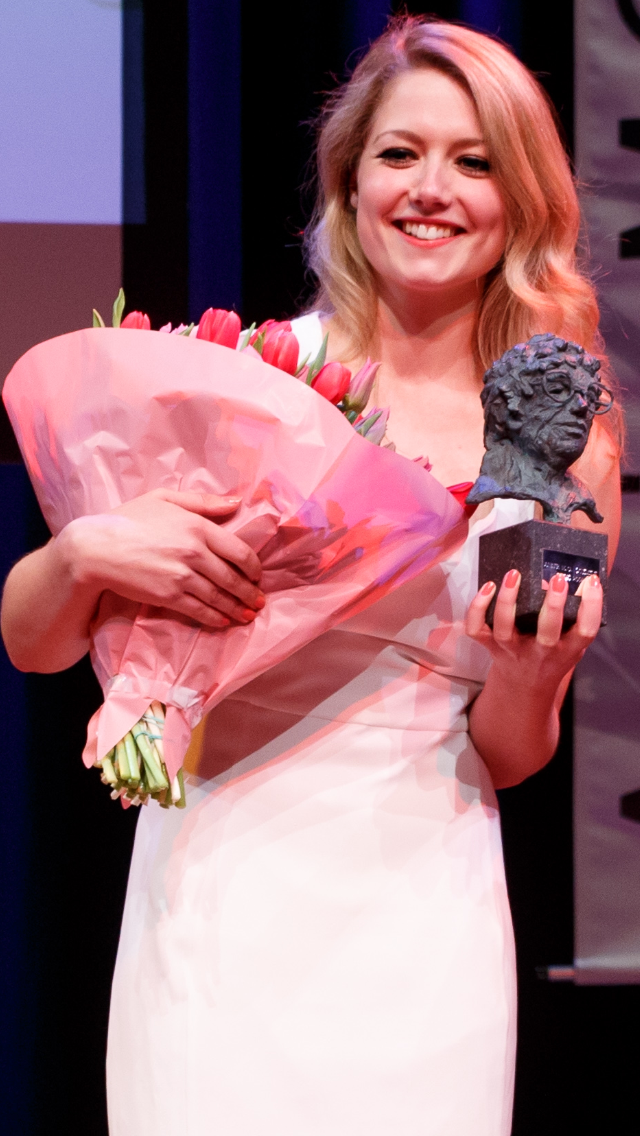
- Yentl Schieman at the 2014 Annie M.G. Schmidt-prize ceremony for the song Ik heb een man gekend by cabaret duo Yentl en de Boer
- Born: May 22, 1986 (age 39); Goes, Netherlands
- Occupations: Actress, singer, cabaret performer
- Years active: 2012–present
- Known for: Yentl en de Boer
- Website: www.yentlendeboer.nl

Yentl Schieman (born 22 May 1986) is a Dutch actress, singer, and cabaret performer. Together with Christine de Boer, she forms the musical cabaret duo Yentl en De Boer.

== Biography ==
Schieman grew up in the village of Kruiningen in Zeeland and moved to Amsterdam at age 18 to pursue a career in theatre. She studied at the Amsterdamse Toneelschool & Kleinkunstacademie, graduating in 2009. In 2012, she and her classmate Christine de Boer founded the cabaret duo Yentl en de Boer, with whom they won both the Wim Sonneveldprijs and the audience award at the Amsterdams Kleinkunst Festival in 2013.

On stage, Schieman appeared in the musical theatre production The Beatles – Here, There and Everywhere, directed by Ruut Weissman, Asterdorp by M-Lab, and De Batavia by Hummelinck Stuurman. Besides her projects with Christine de Boer, she performed her solo piece Omdat ik niet van Sprookjes hou (Because I Don't Like Fairy Tales), directed by Niels van der Laan, and co-created the play Oma with Daan Colijn for production house Bontehond. On television, she appeared in the series Seinpost and A'dam - E.V.A.. Since 2014, she has been part of the singer-songwriter collective Het Nieuwe Lied.

In September 2015, the film De Overkant by Marnix Ruben premiered, based on a short story by Freek de Jonge, with Schieman in the female lead role.

During the 18th edition of the Film by the Sea festival in Vlissingen, Schieman served on the jury chaired by Adriaan van Dis, alongside Saskia Noort, Winnie Sorgdrager, André van Duren, Annelies Verbeke, and Jaap Robben.

In September 2021, the four-part television series Yentl en de Boer de Serie aired on BNNVARA.

In the 2021 film Captain Nova, she played the role of Nova's mother.

In 2023 and 2024, Yentl en de Boer toured theatres with their show Modderkruipers.

== Personal life ==
Schieman is in a relationship with actor Yannick van de Velde, known for Rundfunk. On 26 December 2019, the couple had a daughter.

== Awards ==
- 2013: Jury prize (Wim Sonneveldprijs) and audience prize for De Mensen at the Amsterdams Kleinkunst Festival with Yentl en de Boer
- 2015: Annie M.G. Schmidt-prize 2014 for lyrics, music and performance of the song Ik heb een man gekend (Yentl en de Boer)
- 2021: Annie M.G. Schmidt-prize 2020 for lyrics, music and performance of the song Het is begonnen (Yentl en de Boer)
