= Kaunas =

Second-largest city in Lithuania

- City
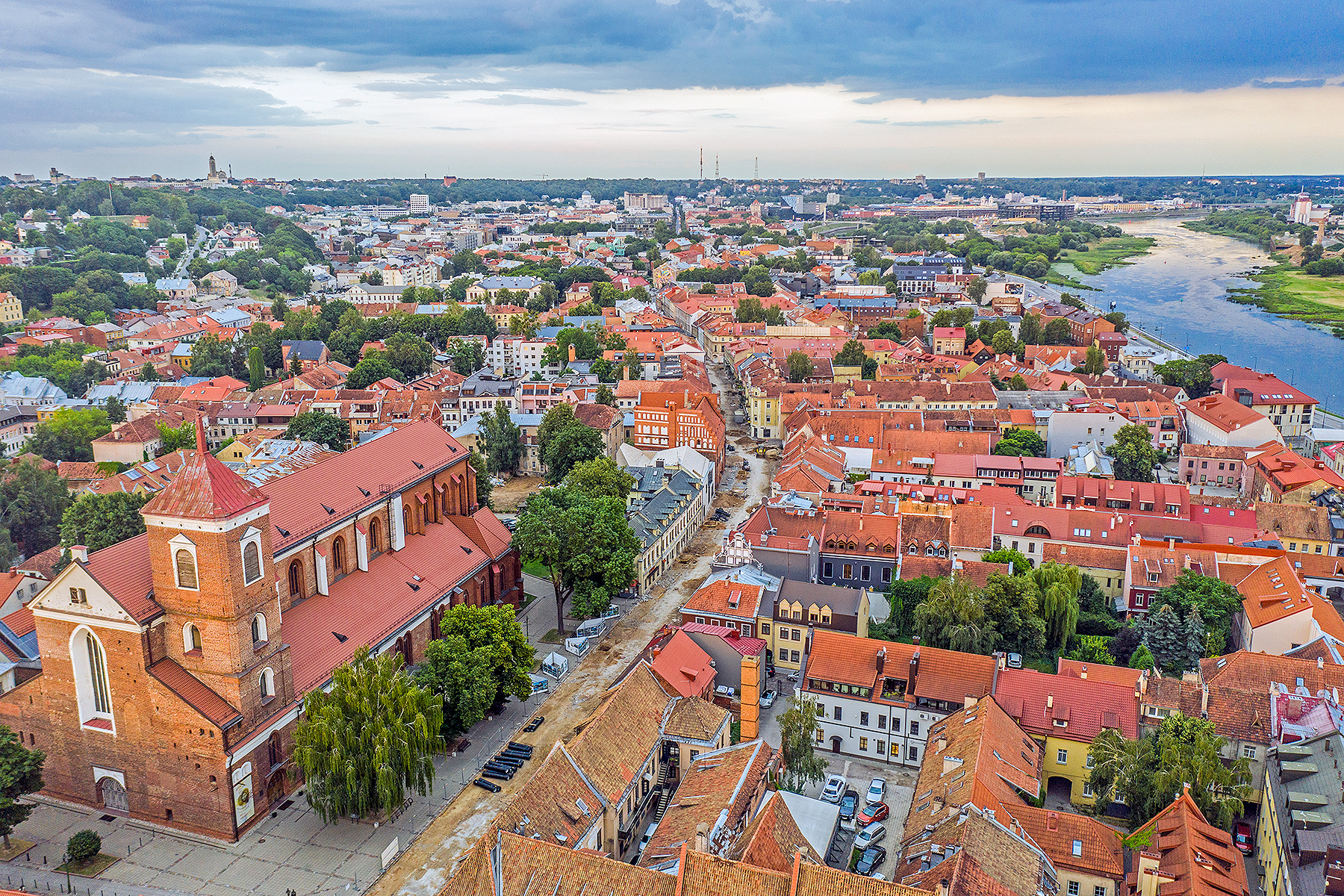
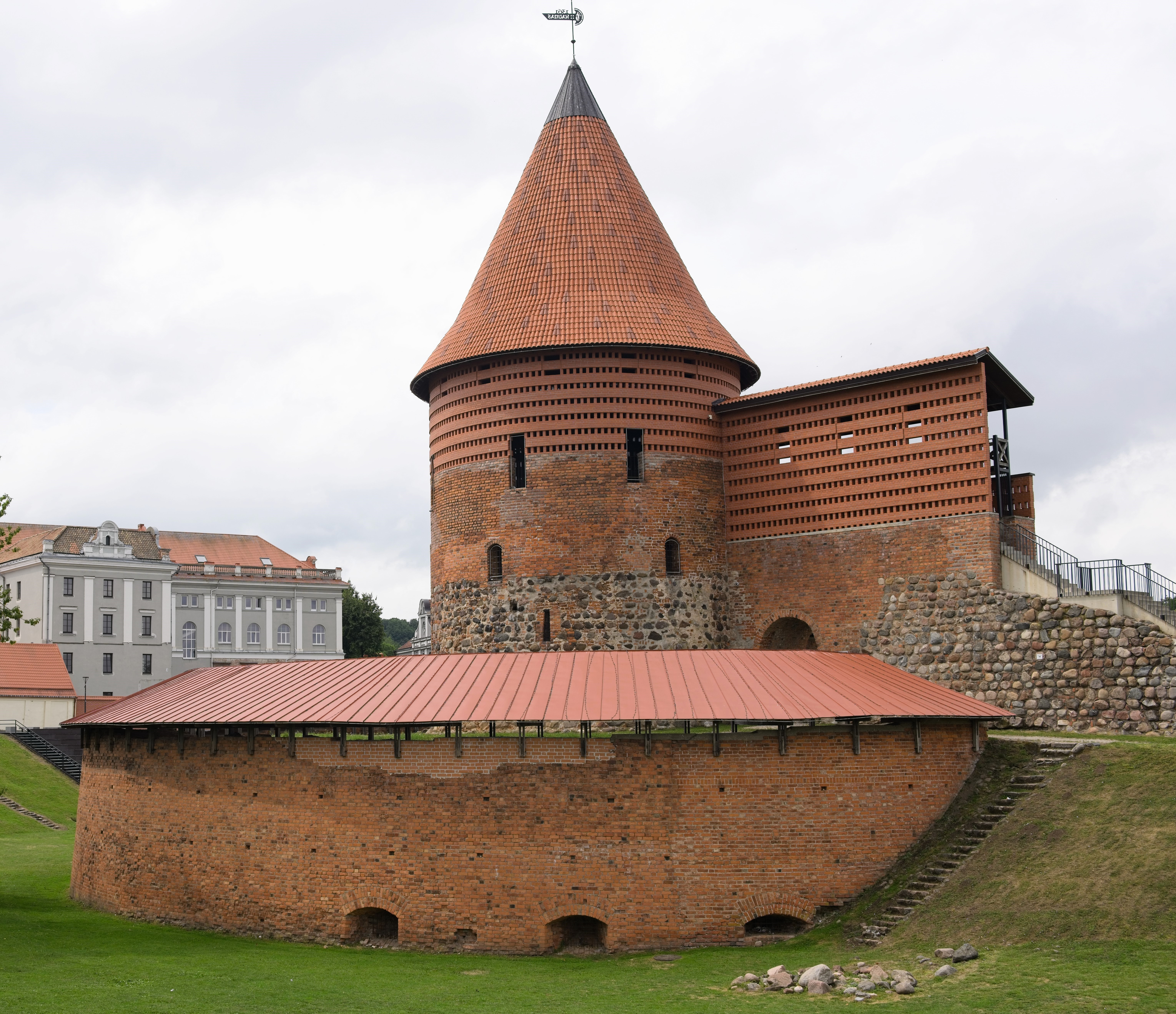
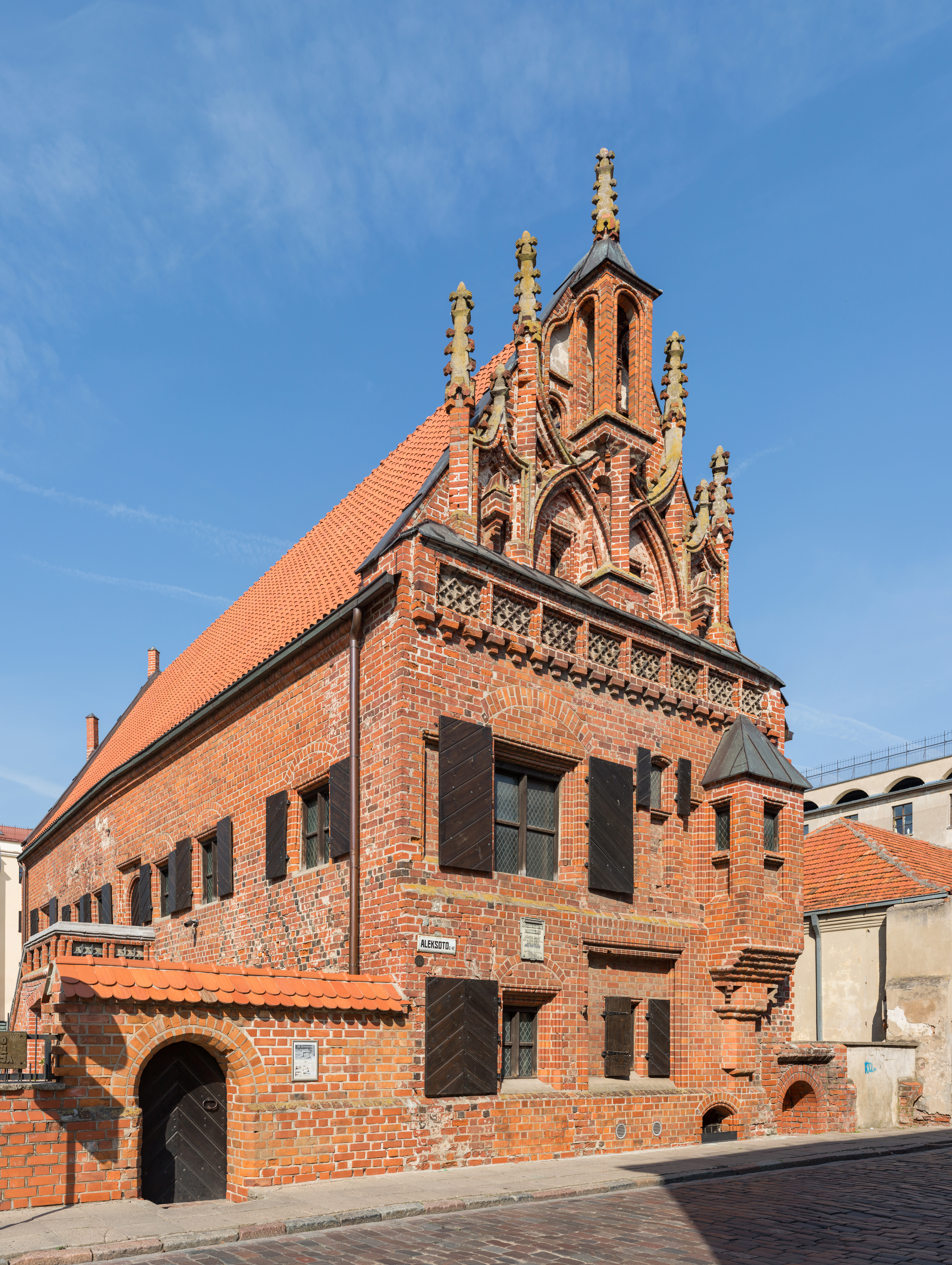
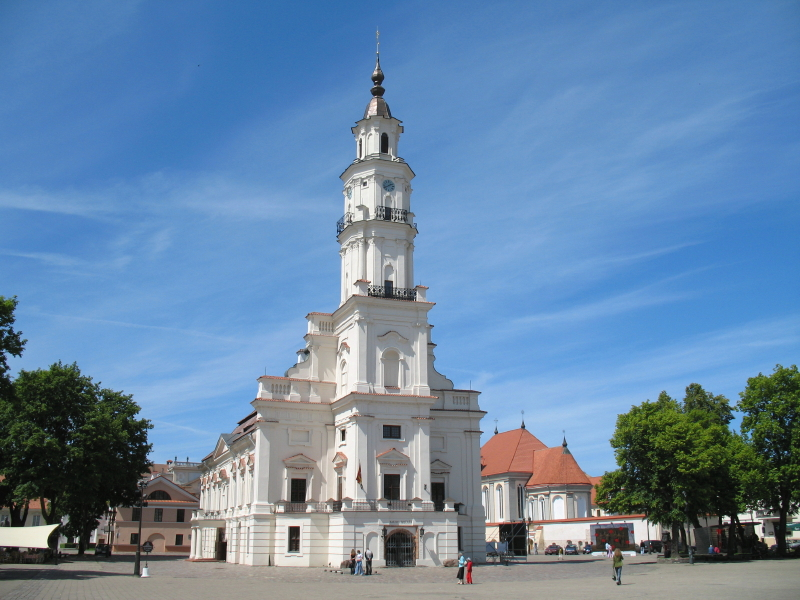
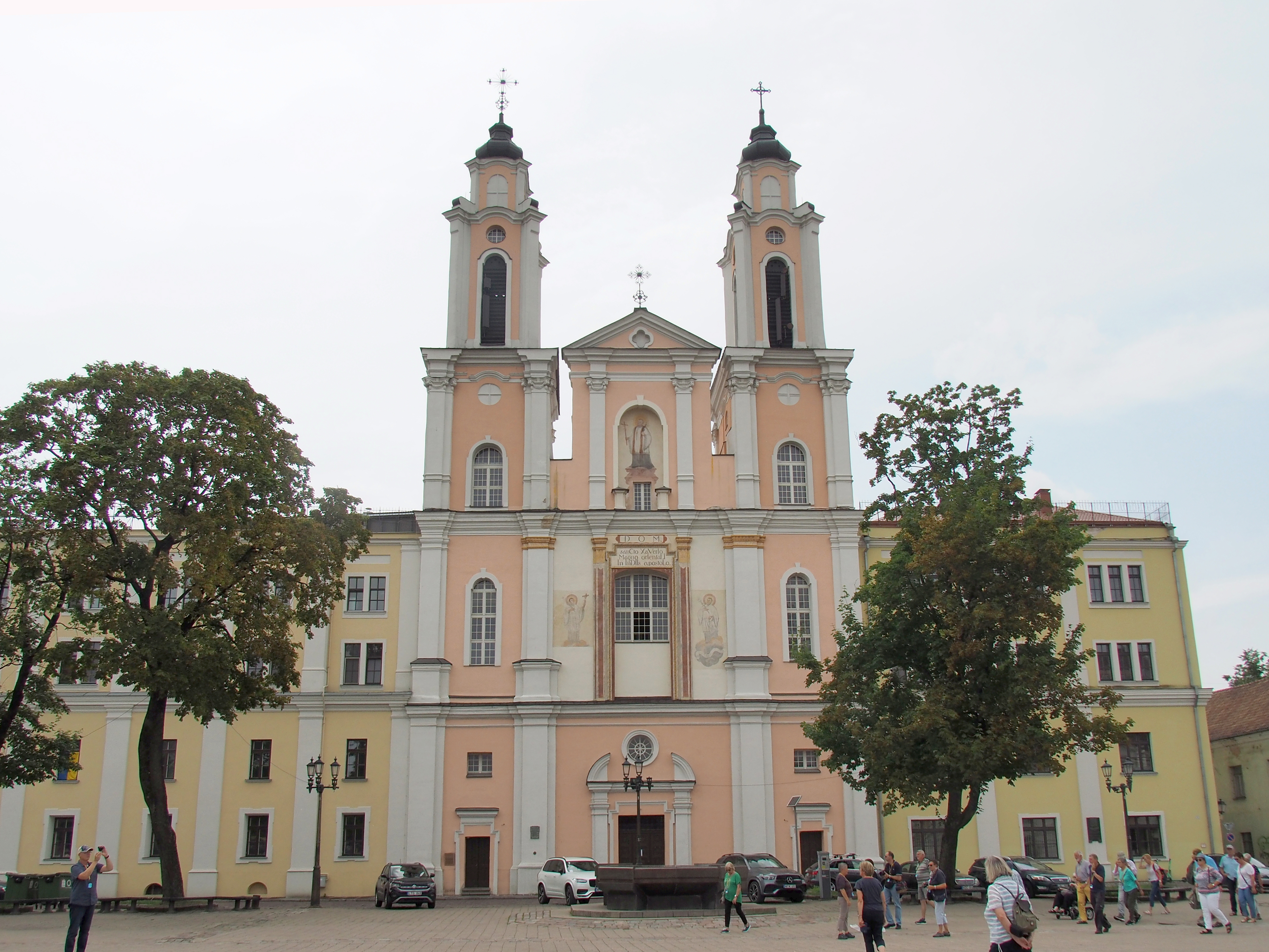
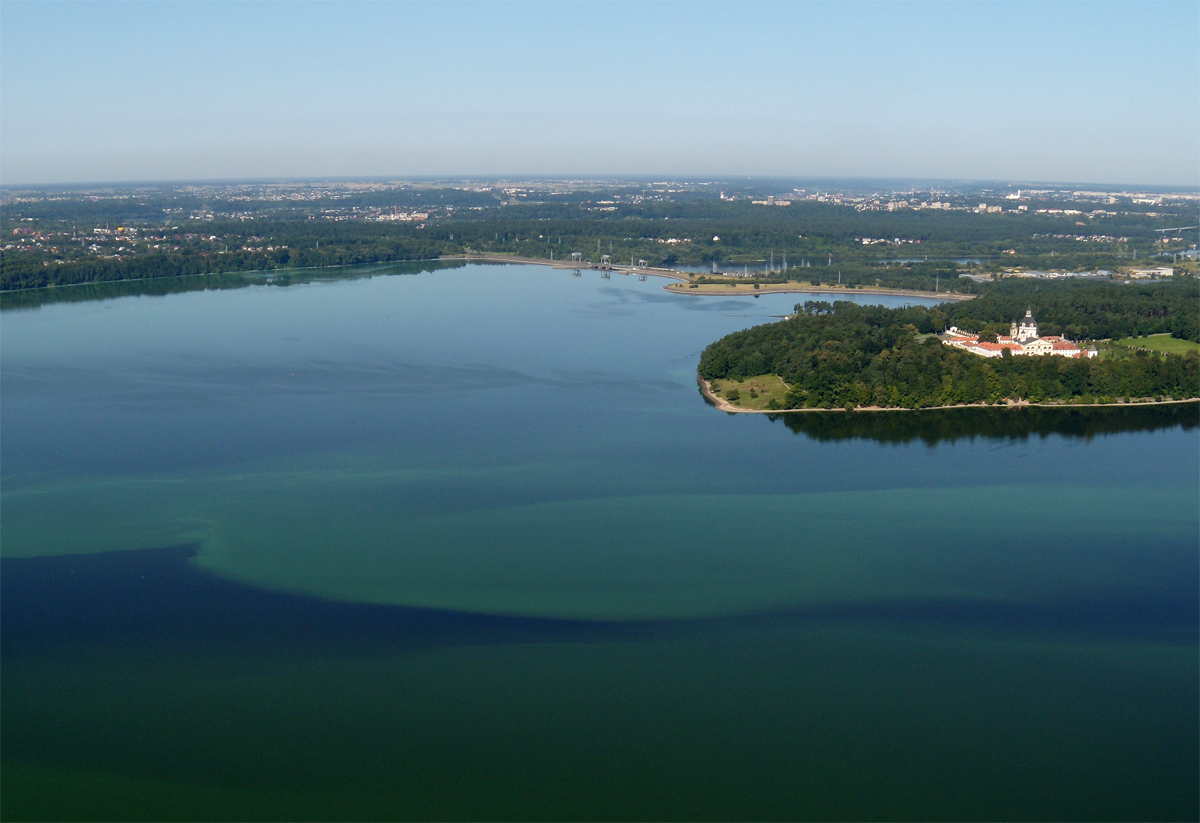
- Kaunas Old Town with Kaunas Archcathedral Kaunas Castle House of Perkūnas Kaunas Town Hall Church of St. Francis Xavier Kaunas Reservoir Pažaislis Monastery

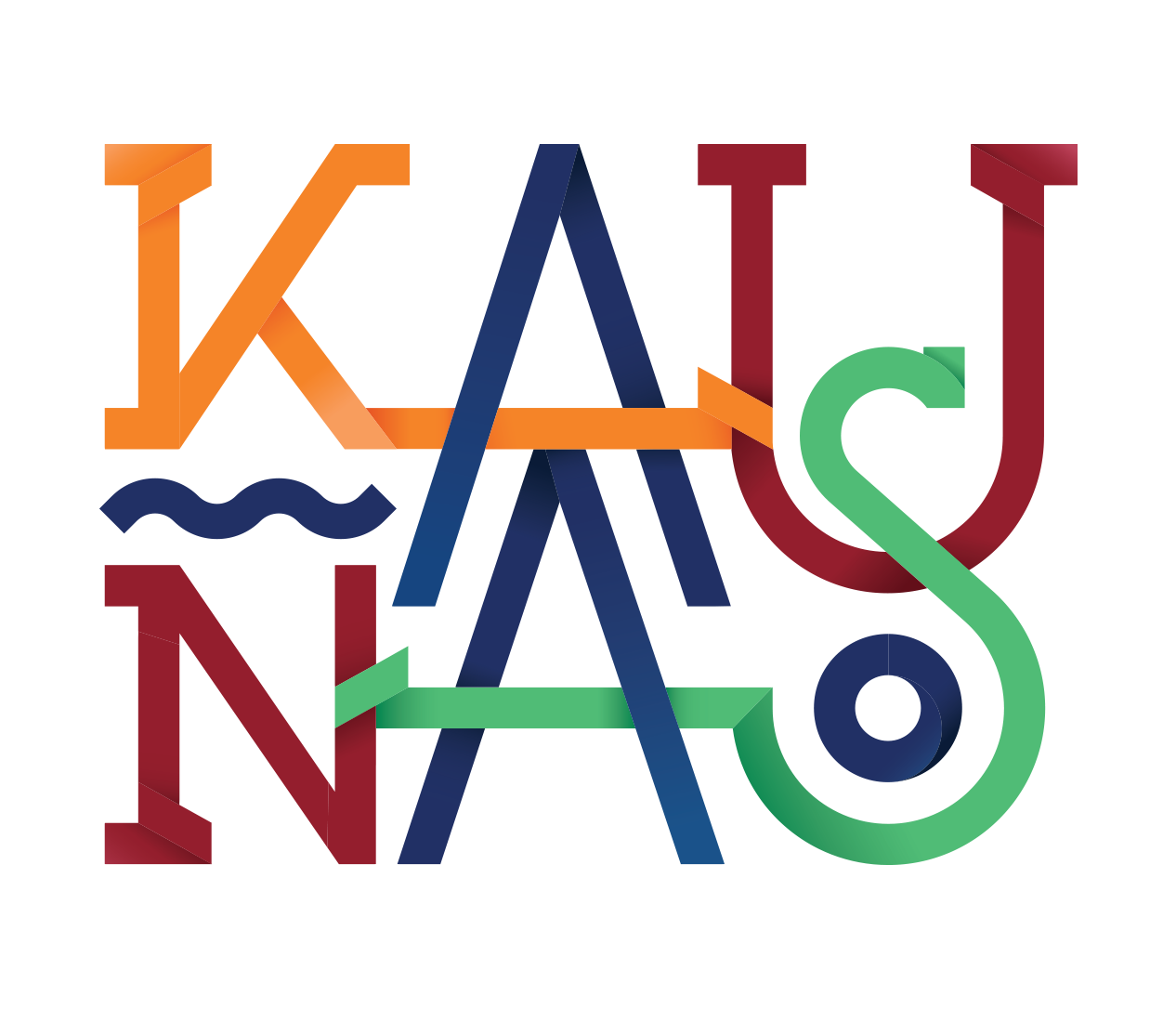
- Flag Coat of arms Brandmark
- Nicknames: Laikinoji sostinė, The Little Paris of interwar
- Motto: Diligite justitiam qui judicatis terram (Latin: Cherish justice, you who judge the earth)
- Interactive map of Kaunas
- Location within Lithuania Location within the Baltics Location within Europe
- Coordinates: 54°53′50″N 23°53′10″E
- Country: Lithuania
- County: Kaunas County
- Municipality: Kaunas city municipality
- Capital of: Kaunas County
- First mentioned: 1361
- Granted city rights: 1408
- Elderships: List: Aleksotas; Centras; Dainava; Eiguliai; Gričiupis; Panemunė; Petrašiūnai; Šančiai; Šilainiai; Vilijampolė; Žaliakalnis

Government
  - Type: Mayor-council government
  - Mayor of Kaunas: Visvaldas Matijošaitis (2015-)

Area
  - City: 157 km^{2} (61 sq mi)
  - Urban: 1,653 km^{2} (638 sq mi)
  - Metro: 8,086 km^{2} (3,122 sq mi)
- Elevation: 48 m (157 ft)

Population (2024)
  - City: 304,198
  - Density: 1,903/km^{2} (4,930/sq mi)
  - Urban: 410,475
  - Urban density: 230/km^{2} (600/sq mi)
  - Metro: 656,417
  - Metro density: 77/km^{2} (200/sq mi)
- Demonym(s): Kaunian(s) (English) kauniečiai (Lithuanian)

GDP (Nominal)
  - Metro: €15.86 billion (2024) (US$17.16 billion)
  - Per capita: €27,000 (2024) (US$29,220.78)
- Time zone: UTC+2 (EET)
  - Summer (DST): UTC+3 (EEST)
- Postal code: 44xxx – 52xxx
- Area code: (+370) 37
- City budget: €0.8 billion (2026)
- Climate: Dfb
- Website: www.kaunas.lt

UNESCO World Heritage Site
- Official name: Modernist Kaunas: Architecture of Optimism, 1919–1939
- Type: Cultural
- Criteria: iv
- Designated: 2023 (45th session)
- Reference no.
- UNESCO region: Europe

Kaunas (/ˈkaʊnəs/; Lithuanian: [ˈkɒʊ̯ˑnˠɐs]) is the second-largest city in Lithuania (after Vilnius), the fourth-largest city in the Baltic states, and an important centre of Lithuanian economic, academic, and cultural life. Kaunas was the largest city and the centre of Kaunas County in the Duchy of Trakai of the Grand Duchy of Lithuania and Trakai Palatinate since 1413. In the Russian Empire, it was the capital of the Kaunas Governorate from 1843 to 1915.

Between 1920 and 1939, when Vilnius was seized and became part of Poland, Kaunas served as the temporary capital of Lithuania. During the interwar period Kaunas was celebrated for its rich cultural and academic life, fashion, construction of countless Art Deco and Lithuanian National Revival architectural-style buildings as well as popular furniture, interior design of the time, and a widespread café culture. The city's interwar architecture is regarded as among the finest examples of European Art Deco and has received the European Heritage Label. This contributed to Kaunas being designated as the first city in Central and Eastern Europe as a UNESCO City of Design, and also to its becoming a World Heritage Site in 2023 as the only European city displaying large-scale urbanization during the interwar period and a range of modernist architecture.

Kaunas was selected as the European Capital of Culture for 2022, together with Esch-sur-Alzette and Novi Sad.

The city is the capital of Kaunas County, and the seat of the Kaunas city municipality and the Kaunas District Municipality. It is also the seat of the Roman Catholic Archdiocese of Kaunas. Kaunas is located at the confluence of the two largest Lithuanian rivers, the Nemunas and the Neris, and is near the Kaunas Reservoir, the largest body of water in Lithuania.

As defined by Eurostat, the population of Kaunas functional urban area is estimated at 391,153 (as of 2021), while according to statistics of Kaunas territorial health insurance fund there are 447,946 permanent inhabitants (as of 2022) in Kaunas and Kaunas district municipalities combined. In addition, the tertiary education institutions of Kaunas attract thousands of students annually.

== Name ==
=== Etymology ===
Kaunas is named "Cavm" on Carta marina from 1539

The city's name is of Lithuanian origin and most likely derives from a personal name, however the exact person is unknown and it is believed that he was the ruler of Kaunas Castle. The personal name Kaunas is derived from an adjective kaunus which means "who likes to fight". Other possible meaning of the name of the city of Kaunas is that it is derived from an old adjective which is not in use anymore and which meant "deep", "low", "located in the valley".

Before Lithuania regained independence, the city was generally known in English as Kovno, the traditional Slavicized form of its name. The Polish name is Kowno [ˈkɔvnɔ], and the names in Belarusian include Koўна (Kowna [ˈkou̯nɐ]) and Каўнас (Kawnas [ˈkau̯nɐs]). The Yiddish name is קאָװנע Kovne, and the names in German include Kaunas and Kauen. On Carta marina from 1539, the city was named Cavm. The city and its elderates also have names in other languages (see Names of Kaunas in other languages and names of Kaunas elderates in other languages).

=== Folk history ===
A 16th-century legend in the Bychowiec Chronicle claims that Kaunas was established by the Romans in ancient times. These Romans were supposedly led by a patrician named Palemon, who had three sons: Barcus, Kunas and Sperus. Palemon fled from Rome because he feared the mad Emperor Nero. Palemon, his sons and other relatives travelled to Lithuania. After Palemon's death, his sons divided his land. Kunas got the land where Kaunas now stands. He built a fortress near the confluence of the Nemunas and Neris rivers and the city that grew up there was named after him. A suburban region in the vicinity is named "Palemonas".

According to historian Teodor Narbutt, the Lithuanians previously worshiped the god Kaunis, whose statue was located in the Kaunas Old Town near the Neman River.

== Coat of arms ==
Great coat of arms of Kaunas

In 1408 Vytautas the Great granted Kaunas the city rights and himself chose the coat of arms of Kaunas with aurochs.

On 30 June 1993, the historical coat of arms of Kaunas city was re-established by a special presidential decree. The coat of arms features a white aurochs with a golden cross between its horns, set against a deep red background. The aurochs was the original heraldic symbol of the city, established in 1400. The heraldic seal of Kaunas, introduced in the early 15th century during the reign of Grand Duke Vytautas, is the oldest city heraldic seal known in the territory of the Grand Duchy of Lithuania. The current emblem was the result of much study and discussion on the part of the Lithuanian Heraldry Commission, and realized by the artist Raimondas Miknevicius. An aurochs has replaced a wisent, which was depicted in the Soviet-era emblem that was used since 1969.

Blazon: Gules, an aurochs passant guardant argent ensigned with a cross Or between his horns.

Kaunas also has a greater coat of arms, which is mainly used for purposes of Kaunas city representation. The sailor, three golden balls, and Latin text "Diligite justitiam qui judicatis terram" (English: Cherish justice, you who judge the earth) in the greater coat of arms refers to Saint Nicholas, patron saint of merchants and seafarers, who was regarded as a heavenly guardian of Kaunas by Queen Bona Sforza.

== History ==
=== Early history ===
According to the archaeological excavations, the richest collections of ceramics and other artifacts found at the confluence of the Nemunas and the Neris rivers are from the second and first millennium BC. During that time, people settled in some territories of the present Kaunas: the confluence of the two longest rivers of Lithuania area, Eiguliai, Lampėdžiai, Linkuva, Kaniūkai, Marvelė, Pajiesys, Romainiai, Petrašiūnai, Sargėnai, and Veršvai sites.

=== Grand Duchy of Lithuania ===
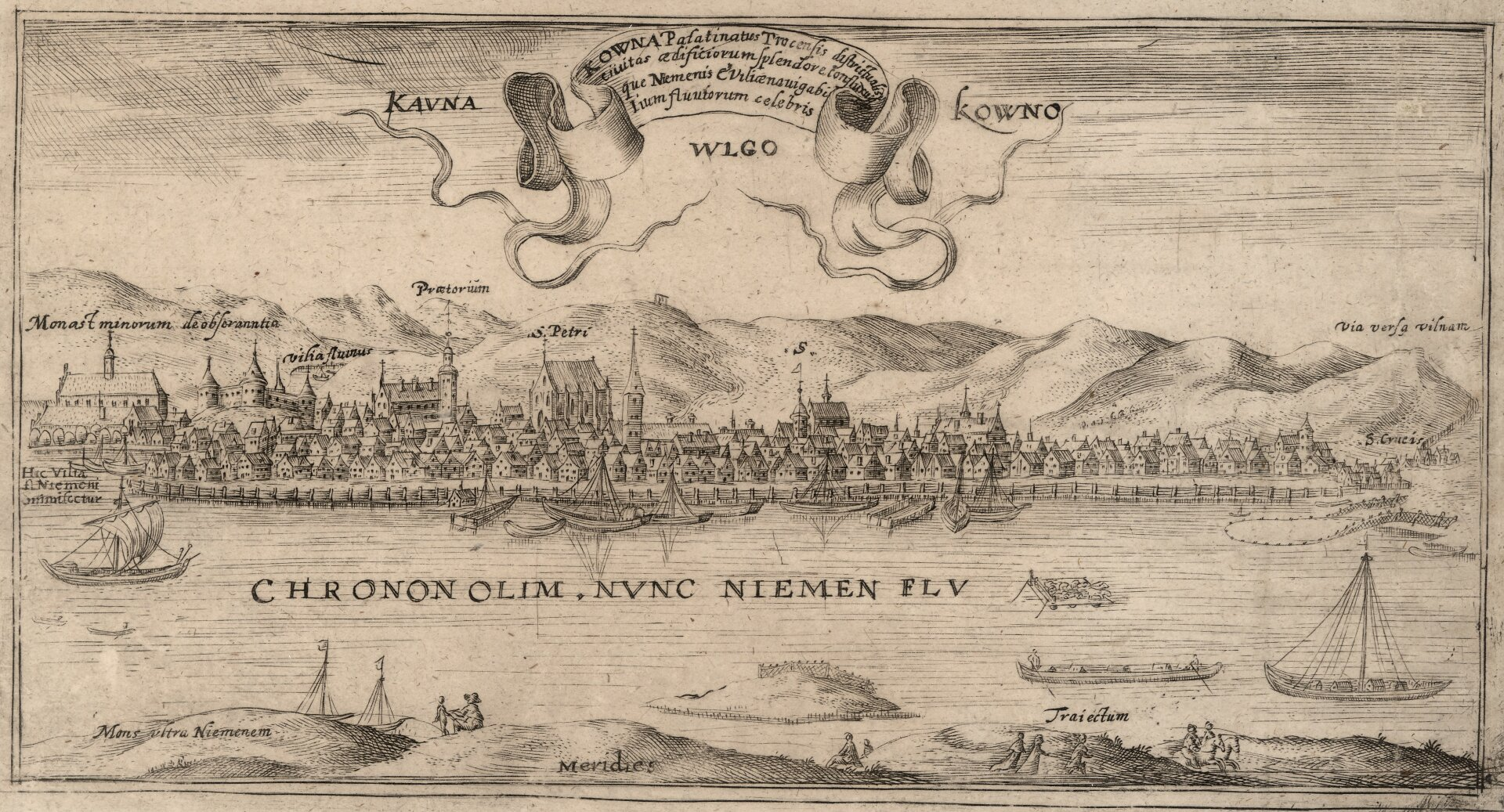
Panorama of Kaunas in 1600 by Tomasz Makowski

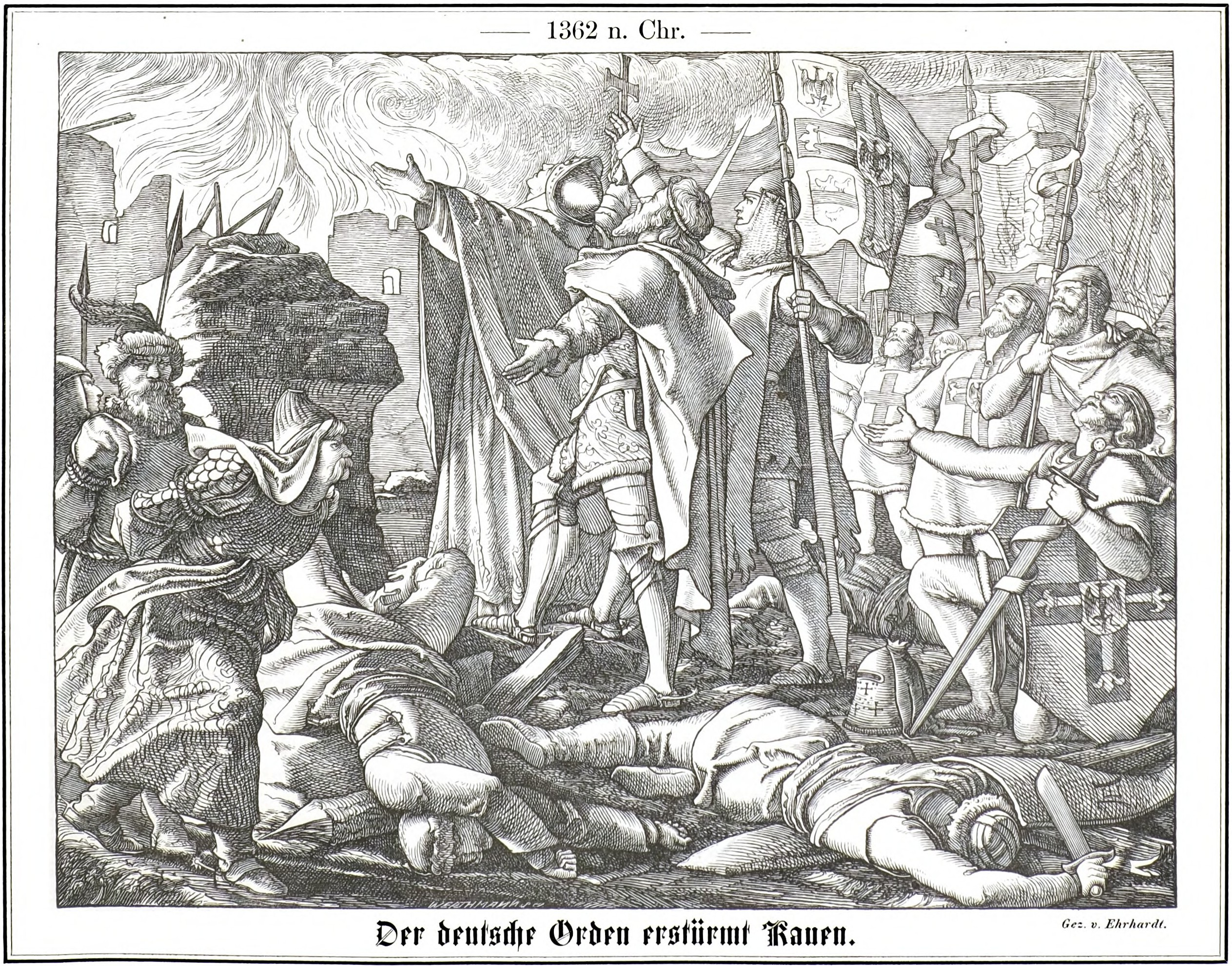
The Teutonic Order storms Kaunas in 1362 (19th century depiction)

A settlement was established on the site of what is now Kaunas Old Town, at the confluence of two large rivers, by at latest the 10th century AD and more settlements developed in the 11th century AD. Kaunas was first mentioned in written sources in 1361 and at the end of the 13th century the brick Kaunas Castle was constructed to defend the residents from attacks by the Teutonic Order. At the time only two brick castles stood near the Nemunas River (in Kaunas and Grodno), which was the main front line of fights between the Crusaders and Lithuanians. Consequently, Kaunas Castle had a strategic importance, as it prevented the Crusaders from intruding deeper into Lithuania and its capital, Vilnius.

In 1362, the castle was captured after a siege of several weeks and destroyed by the Teutonic Order. Lithuanian rulers Kęstutis and Grand Duke Algirdas arrived to help the castle's defenders, but the castle was already surrounded by the fortifications of the Crusaders, and they could only watch the collapse of the castle. Most of the 400 defenders of the castle were killed in action; commander Vaidotas of the Kaunas Castle garrison tried to break through with 36 men, but was taken prisoner. It was one of the largest and most important military victory of the Teutonic Knights in the 14th century against the Grand Duchy of Lithuania.

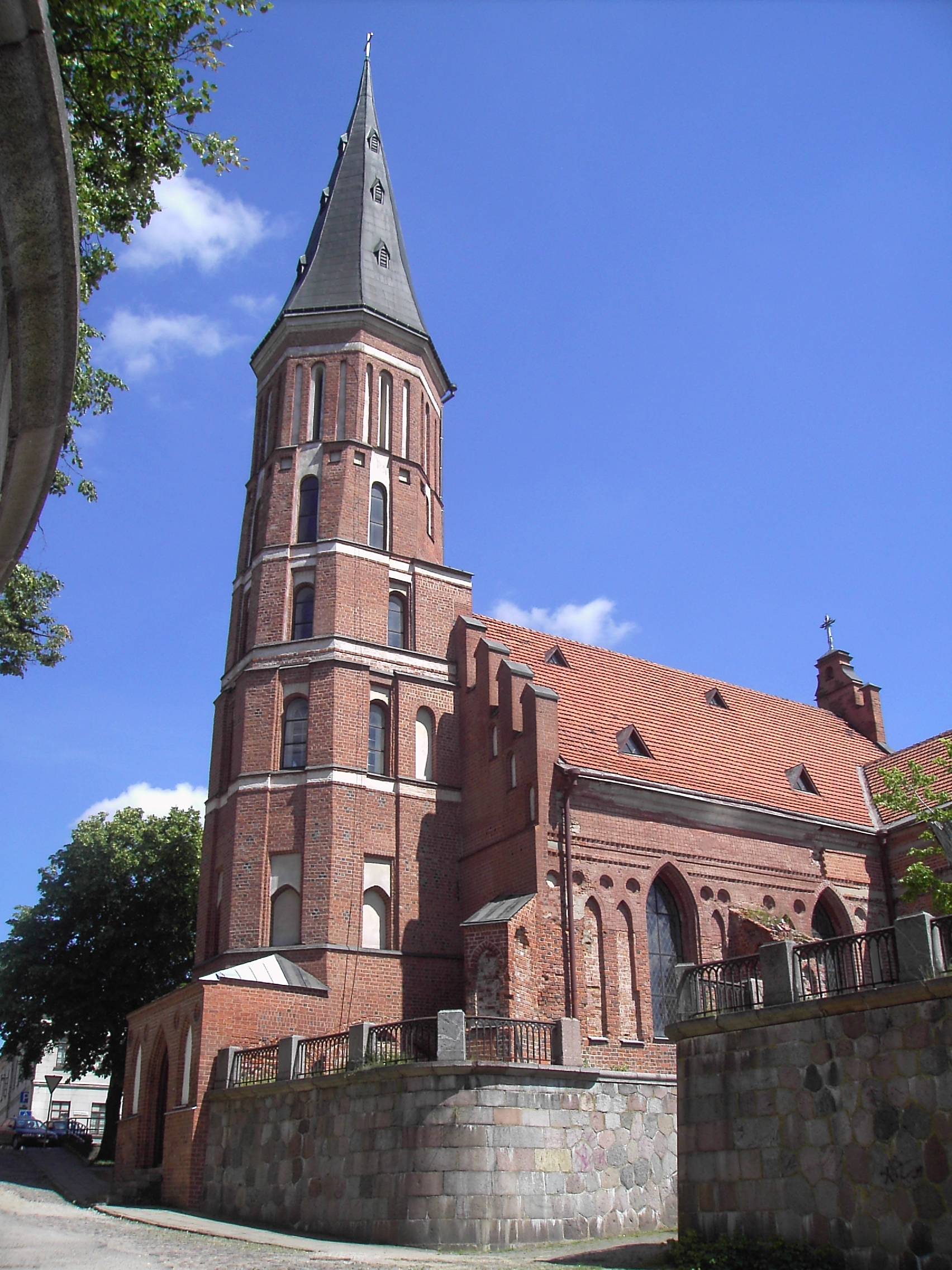
Church of Vytautas the Great, the oldest church in Kaunas, funded by the Grand Duke himself

The Lithuanians constructed a new wooden castle on the island of Virgalė, which stood at the confluence of the Nemunas and Nevėžio rivers; however in 1363 the Crusaders burned the castle. The wooden castle was rebuilt, but in 1368 the Crusaders attacked once again, destroyed the castle and, according to the chronicles, killed 600 pagan defenders, while they themselves suffered only three casualties.

The Lithuanians attempted to rebuild the castle with masonry and higher, wider walls, four flanking towers and a moat, but before its completion the Crusaders attacked in the summer of 1369, expelled the Lithuanians from the island of Virgalė, and with their masonry built Gotteswerder Castle. Gotteswerder Castle was captured after a five-week siege by the Grand Ducal Lithuanian Army, led by Algirdas and Kęstutis, and two wooden castles were built close to it. Nevertheless, the fighting between the Crusaders and the Lithuanians for the area went on until the Lithuanians eventually took control in 1404; it was an important point during the 1409 Samogitian Rebellion and the 1410 war with the Crusaders.

Grand Duke Vytautas the Great funded Church of the Assumption of the Blessed Virgin Mary in Kaunas (the construction was completed in 1400) to show his gratitude to the Virgin Mary for saving him from almost drowning in the river, during the Battle of the Vorskla River, in 1399. Following the Battle of Grunwald in 1410, Kaunas Castle became a residence of the elder of Kaunas, and its military significance decreased.

"After leaving Poseur, I arrived in a large fortified city of Kaunas. It has a very beautiful large castle standing on a cliff of the Nemunas River. Kaunas is twelve miles from Poseur."

— Guillebert de Lannoy description of Kaunas during his trip between 1413–1414.

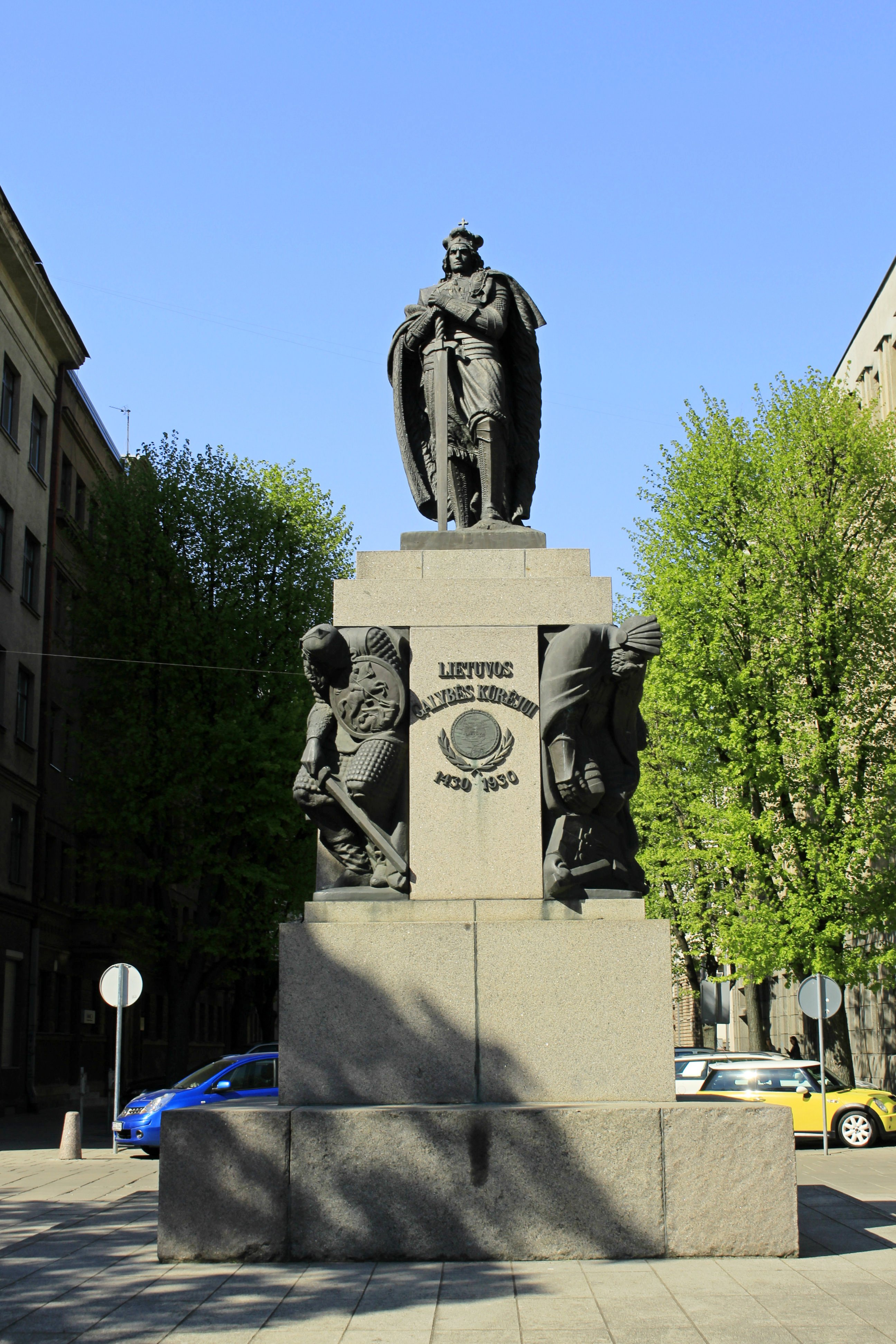
Statue of Vytautas the Great in Kaunas

In 1408, the town was granted Magdeburg rights by Vytautas the Great and in 1413 became the centre of Kaunas Powiat, in Trakai Voivodeship. Moreover, Vytautas ceded Kaunas the right to own the scales used for weighing the goods brought to the city or packed on the site, the wax processing, and woolen cloth-trimming facilities. The power of the self-governing Kaunas was shared by three interrelated major institutions: vaitas (the Mayor), the Magistrate (12 lay judges and 4 burgomasters), and the so-called Benchers' Court (12 persons). Kaunas began to gain prominence, since it was at the intersection of trade routes and a river port. At the time, Kaunas became an important port and centre of trade with Western Europe, thus rapidly growing. In 1441, Kaunas joined the Hanseatic League, and Hansa merchant office Kontor was opened – the only one in the Grand Duchy of Lithuania.

By the 16th century, Kaunas also had a public school and a hospital and was one of the most firmly established towns in the whole country. Furthermore, in the 16th century Grand Duchess Bona Sforza achieved that the Kaunas Eldership should become a property of the Jagiellonian dynasty; starting in 1533, she carried out the Volok Reform.

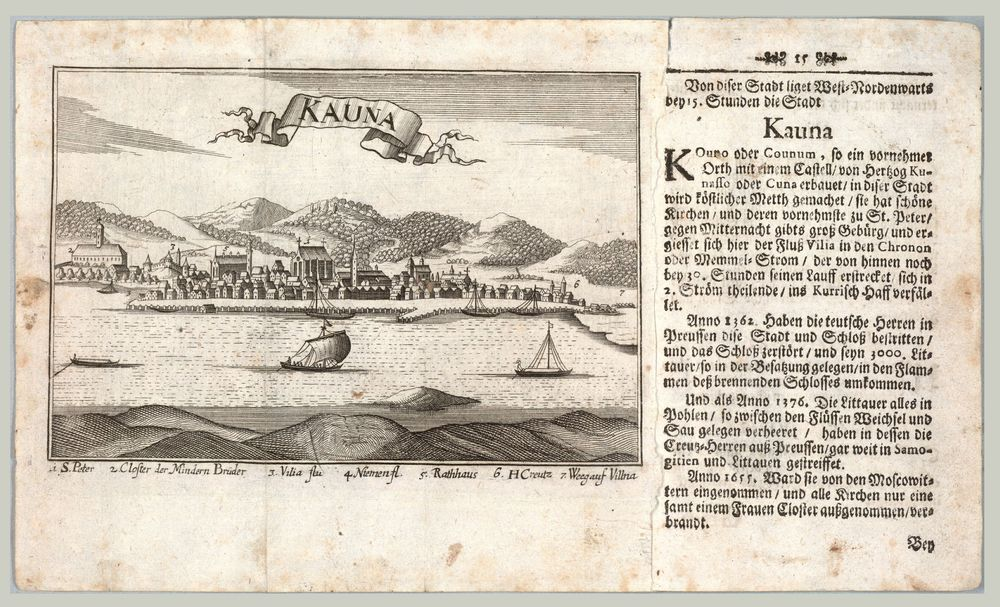
Panorama of Kaunas in 1686 and one of the first descriptions of the city

The late 16th and early 17th centuries saw the greatest period of economic growth in Kaunas, which throughout the city brought the construction of many brick masonry buildings. In the early 17th century, the city's prosperity led to the beginning of the construction of the Wall of Kaunas, which, however, was not completed, due to later wars and economic reasons. In 1665, the Russian army attacked the city several times, and in 1701 the city was occupied by the Swedish Army during the Great Northern War. Bubonic plague struck the area in 1657 and 1708, killing many residents. Fires destroyed parts of the city in 1731 and 1732.

In the first half of the 18th century, the northern wall and two towers of the Kaunas Castle collapsed, due to damage from river water; this led to the abandonment of the castle, and it collapsed into ruins. Subsequently, a jail was established in one part of the castle, in the middle of the 18th century. At the end of the 18th century, the castle was sometimes used to hold meetings of noble families of Kaunas Powiat.

=== Russian Empire ===
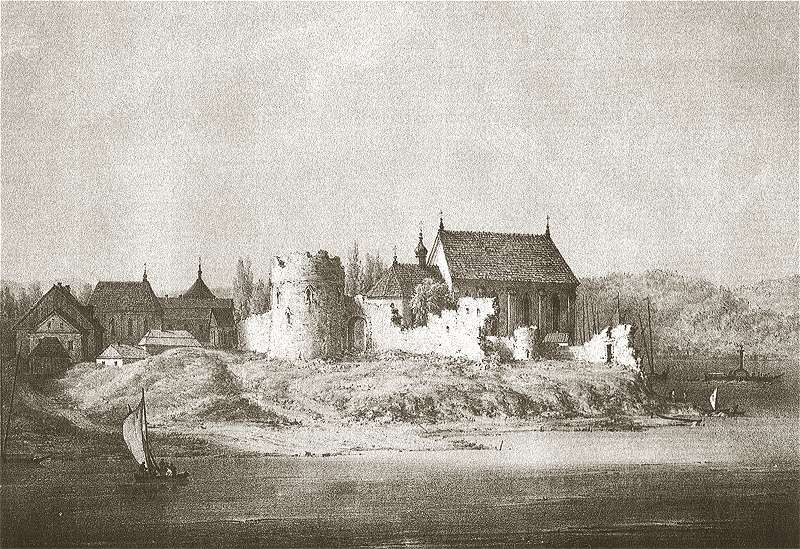
Ruins of the Kaunas Castle with Church of St. George the Martyr in the distance, painted in the 19th century

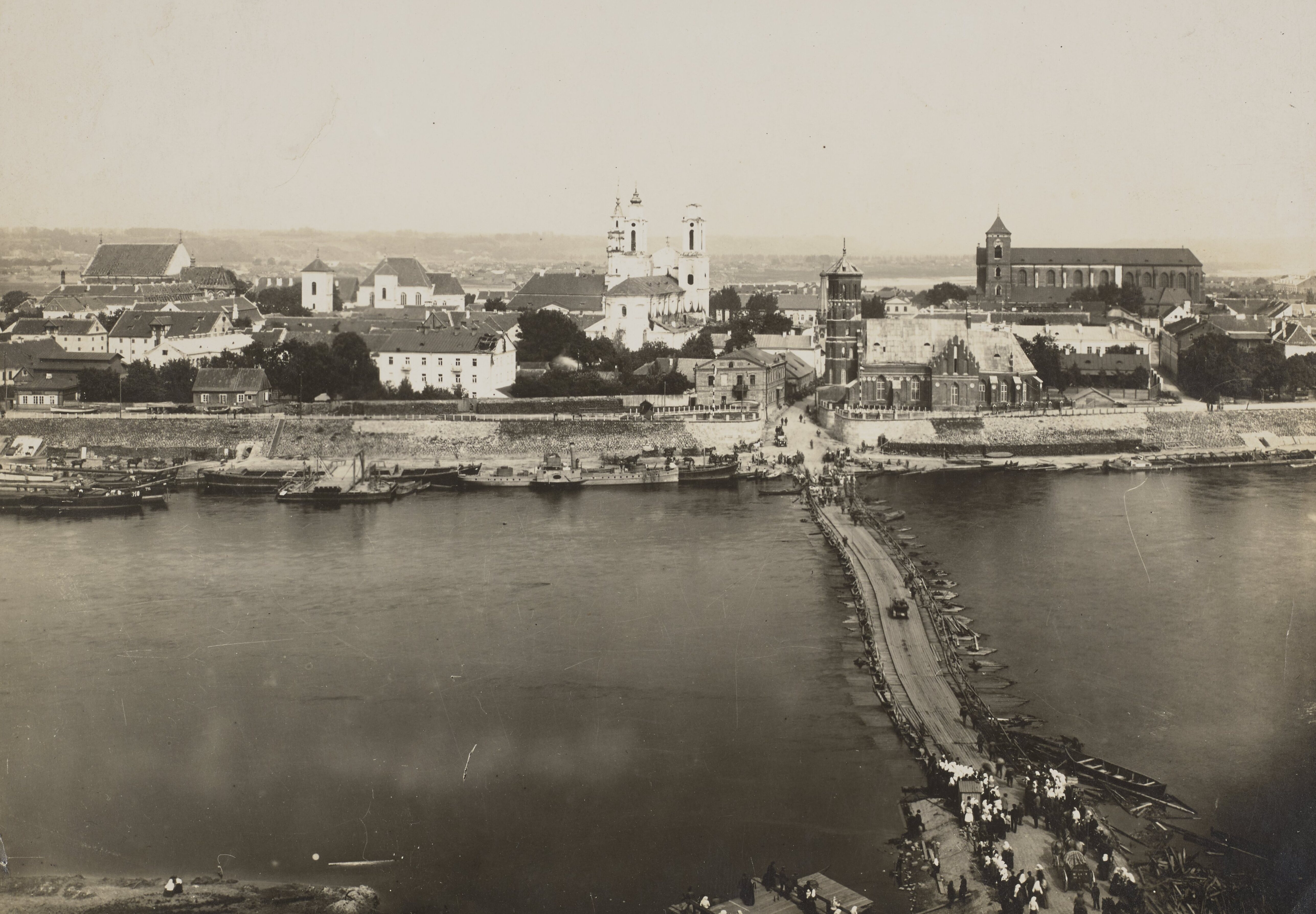
Panorama of Kaunas, ca 1915

After the third and final partition of the Polish–Lithuanian state in 1795, the city was taken over by the Russian Empire and became a part of Vilna Governorate. During the French invasion of Russia in 1812, the Grand Army of Napoleon passed through Kaunas twice, devastating the city both times. A hill fort mound in Kaunas is named Napoleon's Hill.

To prevent possible easy access through the city and protect the western borders of Russia, the Kovno Fortress was built. It is still visible throughout the town.

Kovno Governorate, with a centre in Kovno (Kaunas), was formed in 1843. In 1862, a railway connecting the Russian Empire and Imperial Germany was built, making Kaunas a significant railway hub with one of the first railway tunnels in the Empire, completed in 1861. In 1898 the first power plant in Lithuania started operating.

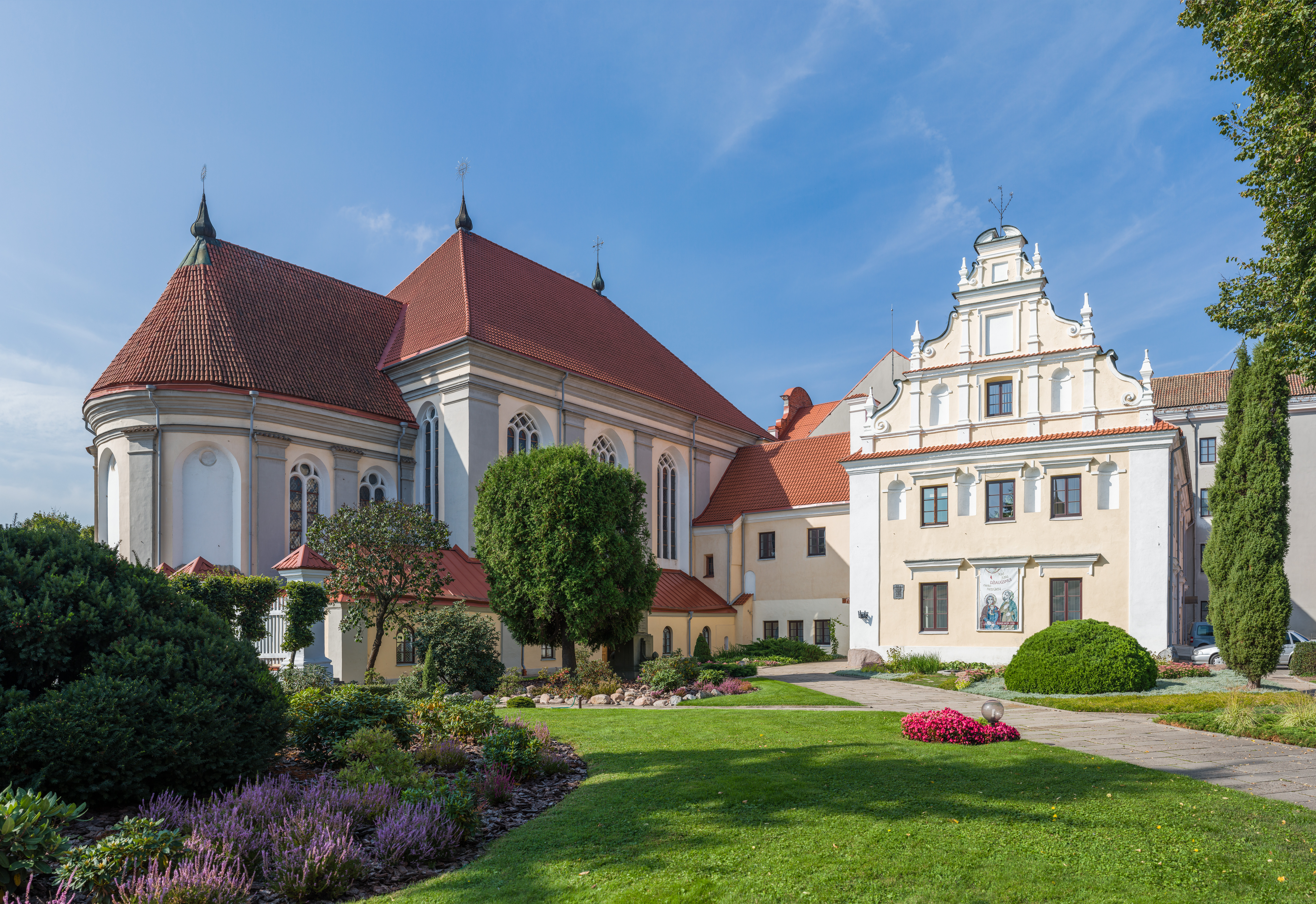
Kaunas Priest Seminary was one of the centres of the Lithuanian National Revival during the Russification era

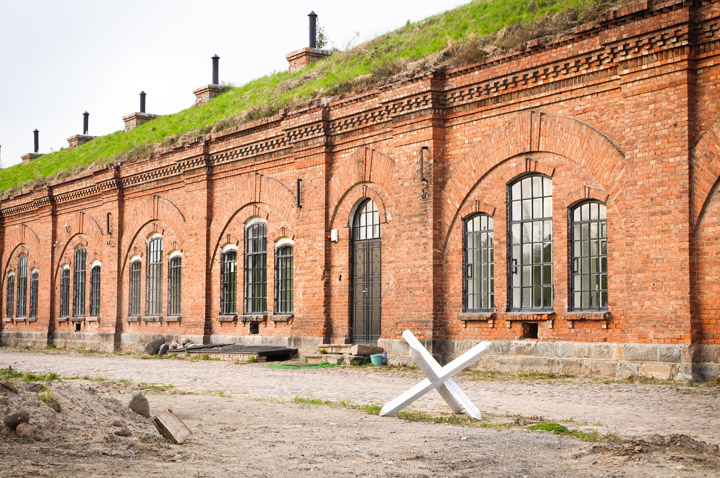
One of the Kaunas Fortress barracks

After the unsuccessful January Uprising in 1863 against the Russian Empire, the tsarist authority moved the Catholic Seminary of Varniai, prominent bishop Motiejus Valančius and Samogitian diocese institutions to Kaunas, where they were given the former Bernardine Monastery Palace and St. George the Martyr Church. Only selected noblemen were permitted to study in the Seminary, with the only exception being peasant son Antanas Baranauskas, who illegally received the nobleman documents from Karolina Praniauskaitė. He began lectures using the Lithuanian language, rather than Russian, and greatly influenced the spirit of the seminarians by narrating about the ancient Lithuania and especially its earthwork mounds. Later, many of the Seminary students were active in Lithuanian book smuggling; its chief main objective was to resist the Russification policy. Kaunas Spiritual Seminary finally became completely Lithuanian when in 1909 professor Jonas Mačiulis-Maironis became the rector of the Seminary, and replaced use of the Polish language for teaching with the Lithuanian language.

Prior to the Second World War, Kaunas, like many cities in Eastern Europe, had a significant Jewish population. According to the Russian census of 1897, Jews numbered 25,500, 35.3% of the total of 73,500. The population was recorded as 25.8% Russian, 22.7% Polish, 6.6% Lithuanian. It established numerous schools and synagogues and were important for centuries to the culture and business of the city.

During the Imperial Russian Army's Great Retreat of World War I, Paul von Hindenburg's German Tenth Army occupied Kaunas in August 1915.

=== Interwar Lithuania ===
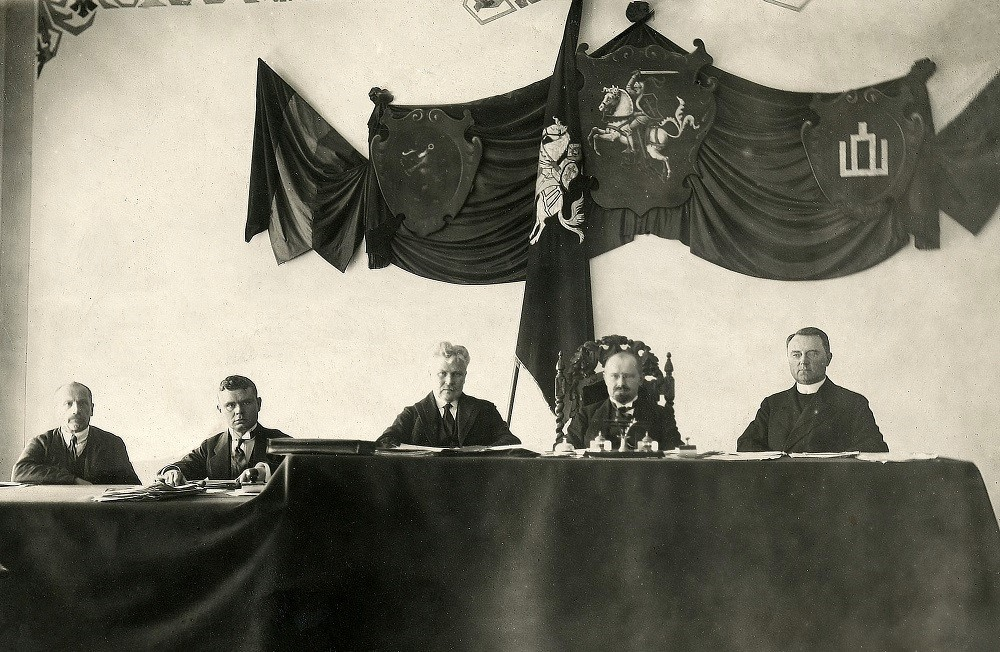
Presidium of the Constituent Assembly of Lithuania in the Seimas Meeting Hall in Kaunas in 1920

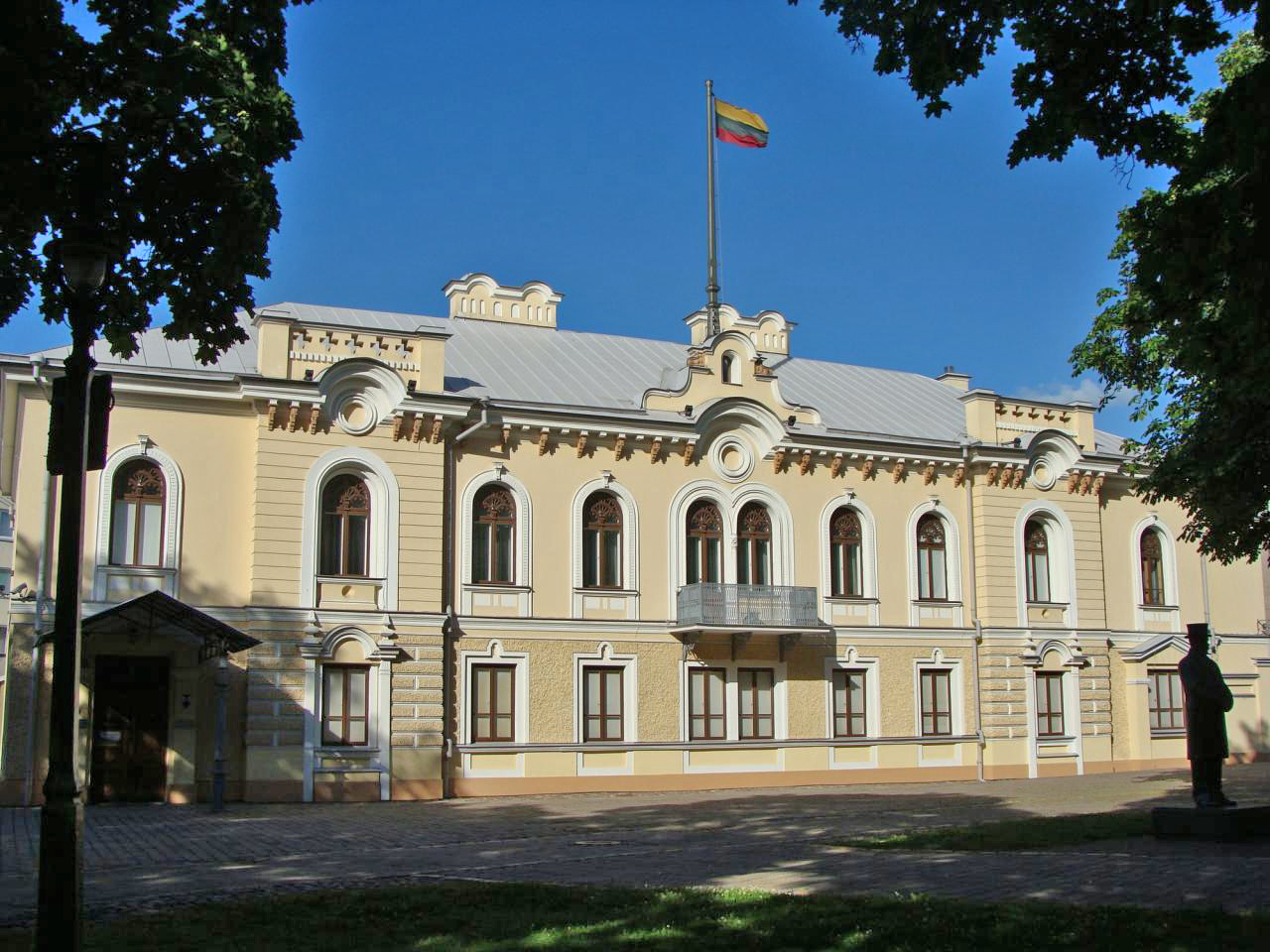
The Historical Presidential Palace

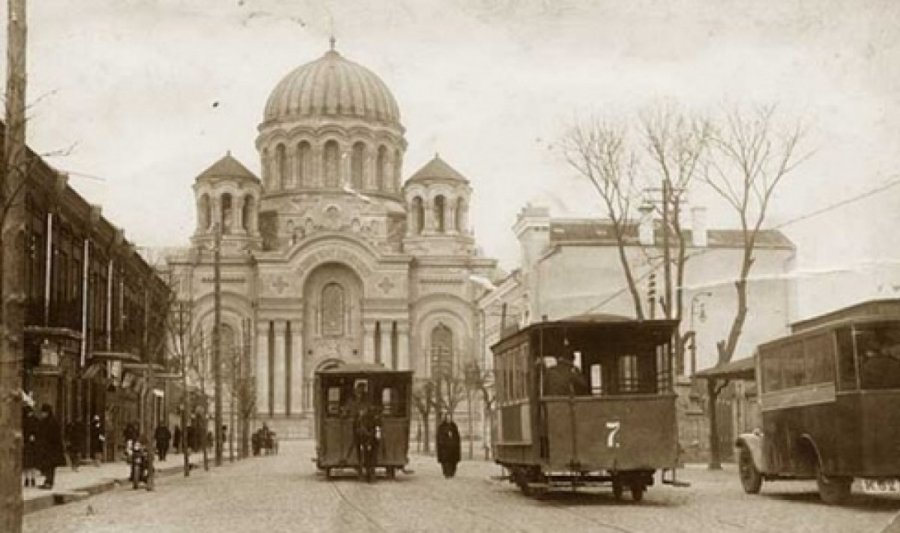
Kaunas early in the interwar period, with horse-drawn trams

After Vilnius was occupied by the Red Army in 1919, the Government of the Republic of Lithuania established its main base in Kaunas during the Lithuanian Wars of Independence. Later, after the capital, Vilnius, had been annexed by the Second Polish Republic, Kaunas became the temporary capital of Lithuania. It held this position until 28 October 1939, when the Red Army handed Vilnius over to Lithuania after its invasion of Poland. The Constituent Assembly of Lithuania first met in Kaunas on 15 May 1920. It passed some important laws, particularly on land reform, on the national currency, and adopted a new constitution. The military coup d'état took place in Kaunas on 17 December 1926. It was largely organized by the military, especially general Povilas Plechavičius, and resulted in the replacement of the democratically elected Government and President Kazys Grinius with a conservative nationalist authoritarian Government led by Antanas Smetona. Shortly afterwards, tension between Antanas Smetona and Augustinas Voldemaras, supported by the Iron Wolf Association, arose seeking to gain authority. After the unsuccessful coup attempt in June 1934, Voldemaras was imprisoned for four years and received an amnesty on condition that he leave the country.

Kaunas Garrison Officers' Club

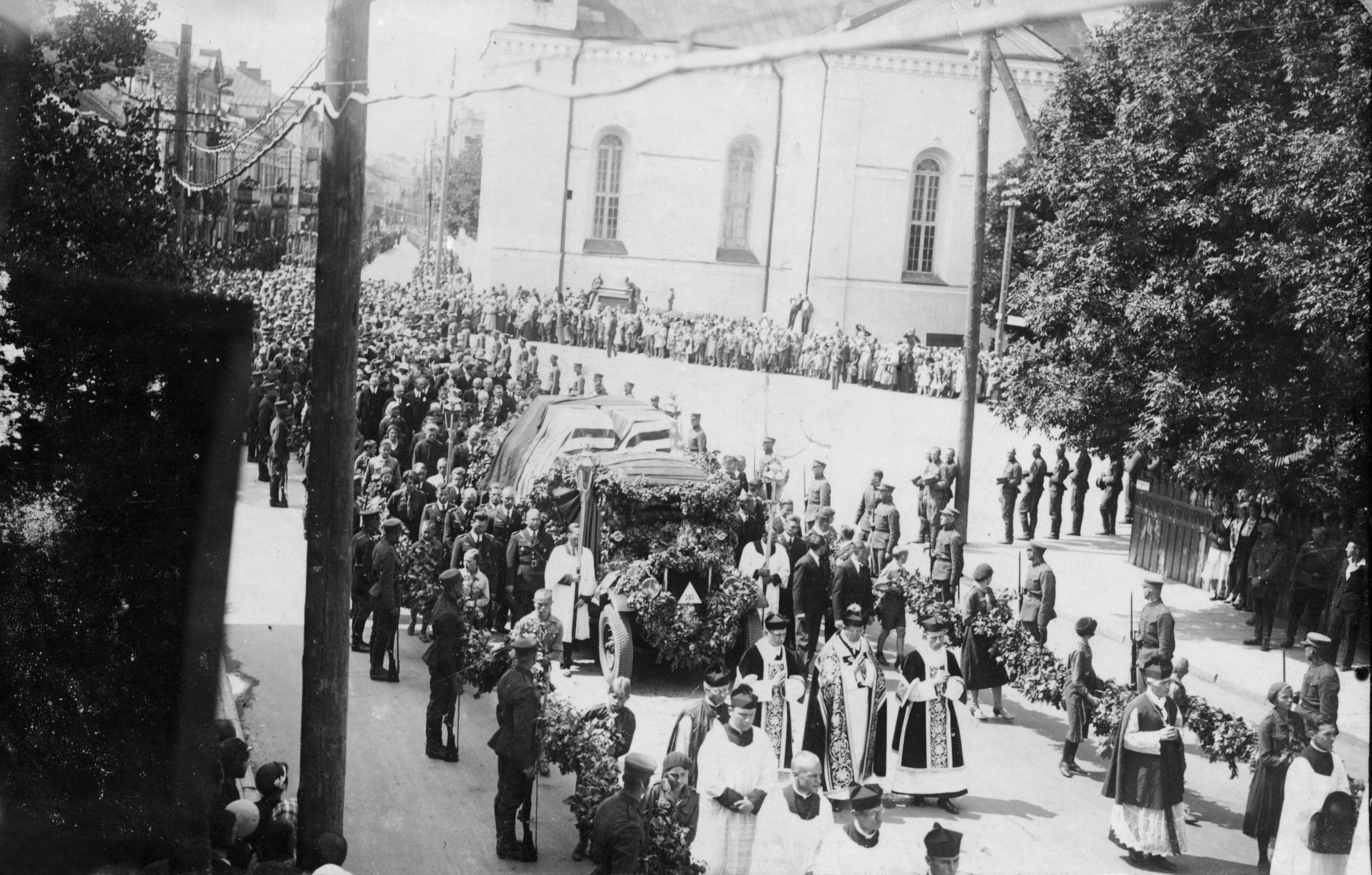
Funeral procession of Lithuanian national heroes – Lituanica pilots Steponas Darius and Stasys Girėnas

During the interwar period, Kaunas was nicknamed the Little Paris because of its rich cultural and academic life, fashion, Art Deco architecture, Lithuanian National Romanticism architectural style buildings as well as popular furniture, interior design of the time and widespread café culture. Economically the interim capital and the country itself also had a Western standard of living with sufficiently high salaries and low prices. At the time, qualified workers there were earning very similar real wages to workers in Germany, Italy, Switzerland and France, the country also had a high natural increase in population of 9.7 and the industrial production of Lithuania increased by 160% from 1913 to 1940. The population of Kaunas increased 8,6 times during the interwar period from ~18,000 to ~154,000 residents.

Between the World Wars, industry prospered in Kaunas, which was the largest city in Lithuania. Under the direction of Mayor Jonas Vileišis (1921–1931) Kaunas grew rapidly and was extensively modernised. A water and waste water system, costing more than 15 million Lithuanian litas, was put in place, the city expanded from 18 to 40 square kilometres (6.9 to 15.4 sq mi), more than 2,500 buildings were built, plus three modern bridges over the Neris and Nemunas rivers. All of the city's streets were paved, horse-drawn transportation was replaced with modern bus lines, new suburbs were planned and built (Žaliakalnis neighbourhood in particular), and new parks and squares were established. The foundations of a social security system were laid, three new schools were built, and new public libraries, including the Vincas Kudirka library, were established. Vileišis maintained many contacts in other European cities, and as a result, Kaunas was an active participant in European urban life.

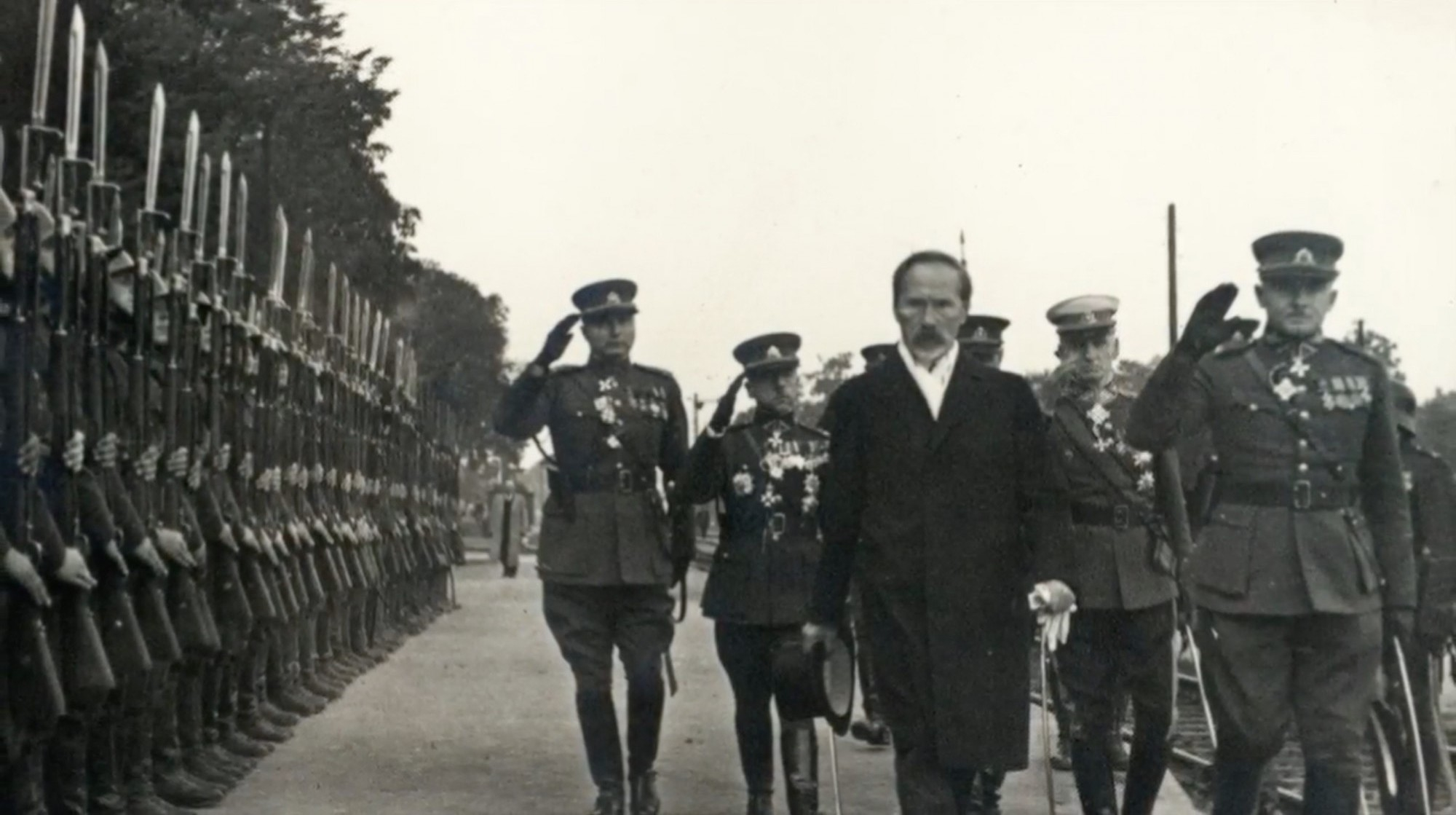
President Antanas Smetona inspects the Lithuanian Army soldiers

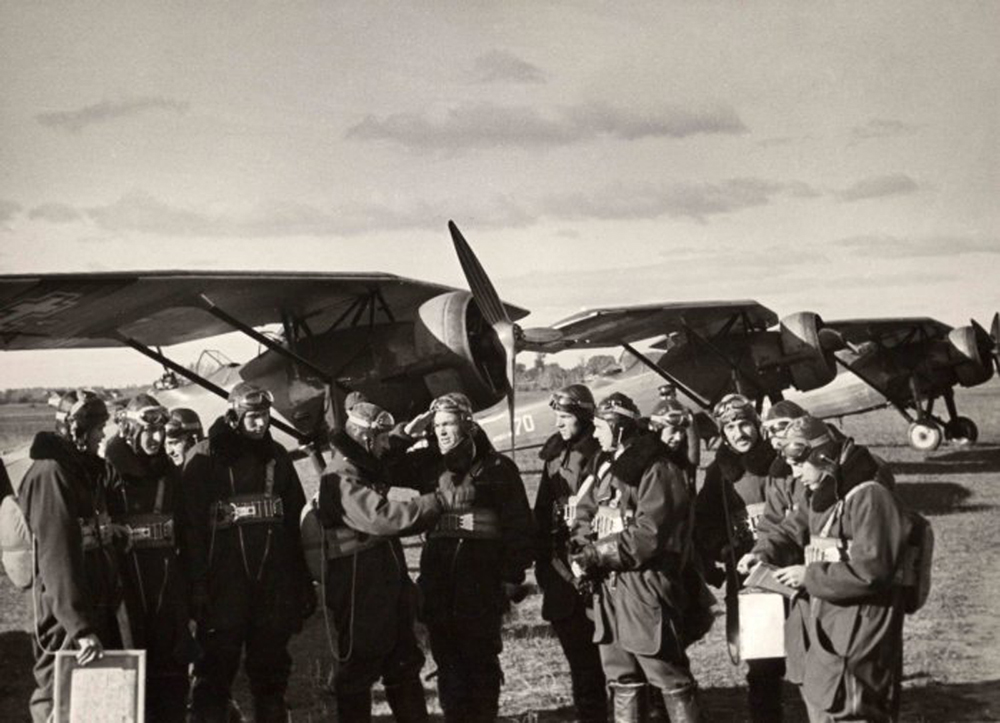
Lithuanian Air Force pilots with their ANBO 41 in Linksmadvaris aerodrome

The city also was a particularly important centre for the Lithuanian Armed Forces. In January 1919, during the Lithuanian Wars of Independence, the War School of Kaunas was established and started to train soldiers who were soon sent to the front to strengthen the fighting Lithuanian Armed Forces. Part of the Lithuanian armoured vehicles military unit was moved to Žaliakalnis, armed with advanced and brand new tanks, including the famous Renault FT, Vickers-Armstrong Model 1933 and Model 1936. In May 1919, the Lithuanian Aircraft State Factory was founded in Freda to repair and to supply the army with military aircraft. It was considerably modernized by Antanas Gustaitis and started to build Lithuanian ANBO military aircraft. The exceptional discipline and regularity caused the Lithuanian Air Force to be an example for other military units. The ANBO 41 was far ahead of the most modern foreign reconnaissance aircraft of that time in structural features, and most importantly in speed and in rate of climb.

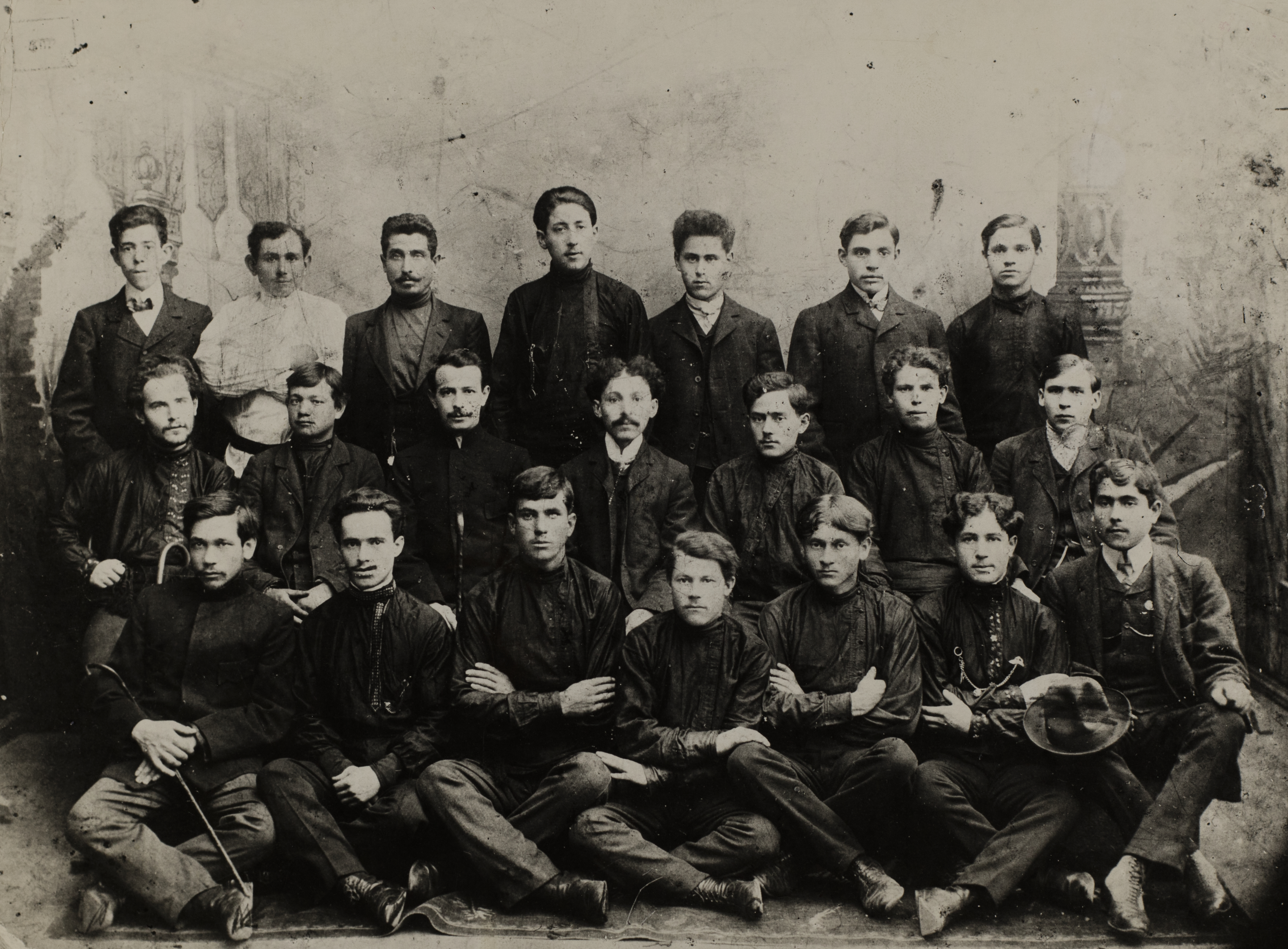
Bund self-defense group in Kaunas c. 1900s

At the time, Kaunas had a Jewish population of 35,000–40,000, about one quarter of the city's total population. Jews made up much of the city's commercial, artisan, and professional sectors. Kaunas was a centre of Jewish learning, and the yeshiva in Slobodka (Vilijampolė) was one of Europe's most prestigious institutes of higher Jewish learning. Kaunas had a rich and varied Jewish culture. There were almost 100 Jewish organizations, 40 synagogues, many Yiddish schools, 4 Hebrew high schools, a Jewish hospital, and scores of Jewish-owned businesses. It was also an important Zionist centre.

As a result of the local government elections in 1919, 30 Poles, 22 Jews, 12 Lithuanians, 6 Germans and 1 Russian were elected to the 71-person Kaunas City Council.

At that time, Kaunas also had a large Polish minority, which by 1919 constituted a majority (42%, compared to 31% for Jews and 16% for Lithuanians). Poles had their own schools, sports clubs (Sparta Kaunas), and press. However, following the 1919 Polish coup attempt and Poland's annexation of Vilnius Region in 1922, the Lithuanian authorities at the time were chauvinistic and blocked the development of both the Polish and Jewish minorities. In 1923, signs in Polish were banned, and in the following years, schools were closed and sports clubs were banned, attacks and pogroms against the Polish population occurred (including in 1926 and 1930), which ended after 1938 when the Polish authorities issued an ultimatum to Lithuania.

Initially prior to World War II, Lithuania declared neutrality. However, on 7 October 1939, the Lithuanian delegation departed to Moscow, where it later had to sign the Soviet–Lithuanian Mutual Assistance Treaty because of the unfavorable situation. The treaty resulted in five Soviet military bases with 20,000 troops established across Lithuania in exchange for Lithuania's historical capital Vilnius. According to the Lithuanian Minister of National Defence Kazys Musteikis, Lithuanian Minister of Foreign Affairs Juozas Urbšys initially told that Lithuanians refused Vilnius Region as well as the Russian garrisons, but the nervous Joseph Stalin replied, "No matter if you take Vilnius or not, the Russian garrisons will enter Lithuania anyway". He also informed Juozas Urbšys about the Soviet–German secret protocols and showed maps of the spheres of influence. Two of the military bases with thousands of Soviet soldiers were established close to Kaunas in Prienai and Gaižiūnai. Despite the takeover of Vilnius, the Presidency and the Government remained in Kaunas.

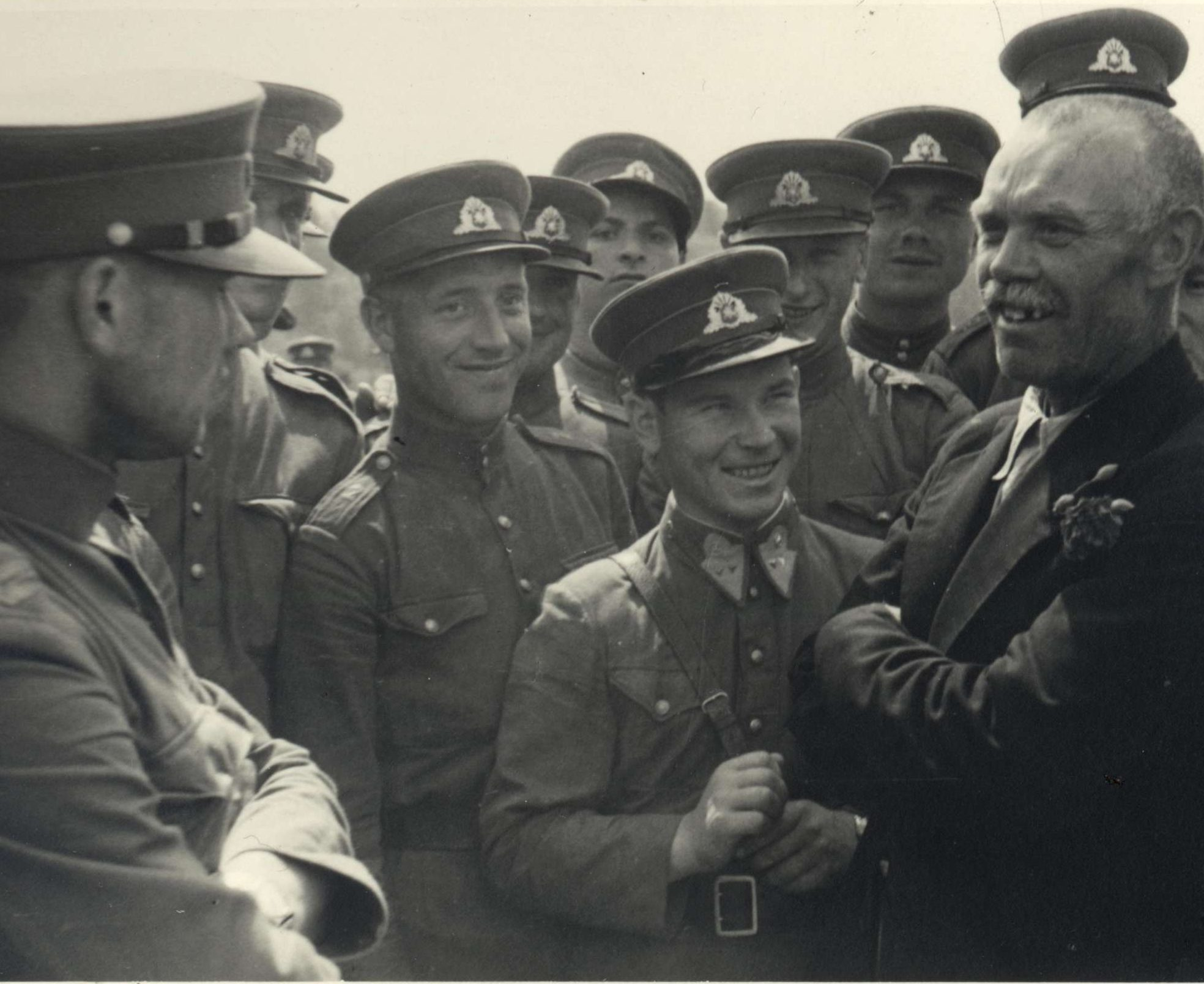
Soviet political leader (without military shoulder straps) and the People's Seimas member (with red rose in his jacket lapel) announces to the Lithuanian People's Army non-commissioned officers that "soon you will become members of the Red Army" in Kaunas, 1940

On 14 June 1940, just before midnight, the last meeting of the Lithuanian government was held in Kaunas. During it, the ultimatum presented by the Soviet Union was debated. President Antanas Smetona categorically declined to accept most of the ultimatum's demands, argued for military resistance and was supported by Kazys Musteikis, Konstantinas Šakenis, Kazimieras Jokantas, however the Commander of the Armed Forces Vincas Vitkauskas, Divisional General Stasys Raštikis, Kazys Bizauskas, Antanas Merkys and most of the Lithuanian government members decided that it would be impossible, especially the previously stationed Soviet soldiers, and accepted the ultimatum. On that night before officially accepting the ultimatum, the Soviet forces executed the Lithuanian border guard Aleksandras Barauskas near the Byelorussian SSR border. In the morning, the Lithuanian Government resigned, and the president left the country to avoid the fate of the Soviets' puppets and in the hope of forming a government-in-exile. Soon the Red Army flooded Lithuania through the Belarus–Lithuania border with more than 200,000 soldiers and took control of the most important cities, including Kaunas where the heads of state resided. The Lithuanian Armed Forces were ordered not to resist, and the Lithuanian Air Force remained on the ground. At the time, the Lithuanian Armed Forces had 26,084 soldiers (of which 1,728 officers) and 2,031 civil servants. While the Lithuanian Riflemen's Union, subordinate to the army commander, had over 62,000 members, of which about 70% were farmers and agricultural workers.

After the occupation, the Soviets immediately took brutal action against the high-ranking officials of the state. Both targets of the ultimatum, Minister of the Interior Kazys Skučas and the Director of the State Security Department of Lithuania Augustinas Povilaitis, were transported to Moscow and later executed. Antanas Gustaitis, Kazys Bizauskas, Vytautas Petrulis, Kazimieras Jokantas, Jonas Masiliūnas, Antanas Tamošaitis also faced that fate, and President Aleksandras Stulginskis, Juozas Urbšys, Leonas Bistras, Antanas Merkys, Pranas Dovydaitis, Petras Klimas, Donatas Malinauskas and thousands of others were deported. Stasys Raštikis, persuaded by his wife, secretly crossed the German border. After realizing this, NKVD started terror against the Raštikis family. His wife was separated from their one-year-old daughter and brutally interrogated at Kaunas Prison, his old father Bernardas Raštikis, three daughters, two brothers and sister were deported to Siberia. Soldiers, officers, senior officers and generals of the Lithuanian Army and LRU members, who were seen as a threat to the occupiers, were quickly arrested, interrogated and released to the reserve, deported to the concentration camps or executed, which made many, trying to avoid that fate, join the Lithuanian partisan forces. The army itself was initially renamed the Lithuanian People's Army but was later reorganised into the 29th Rifle Corps of the Soviet Union.

=== Soviet occupation and June Uprising ===
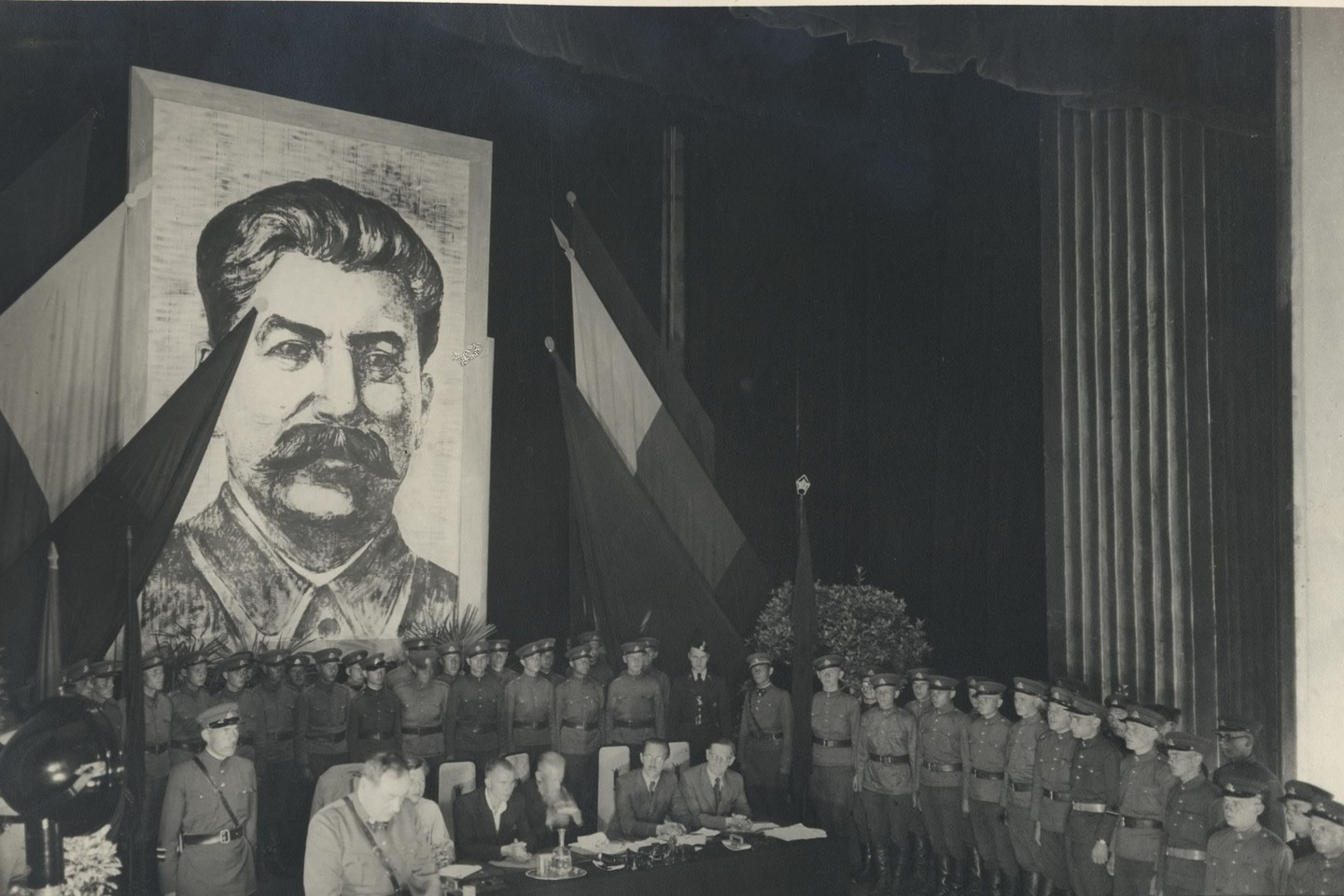
Delegation of the army attending the session of the People's Seimas in Kaunas following the rigged election

In June 1940, the Soviet Union occupied and annexed Lithuania in accordance with the Molotov–Ribbentrop Pact. Vladimir Dekanozov, a Soviet emissary from Moscow, gained effective power in Lithuania. Shortly afterwards, on 17 June 1940 the puppet People's Government of Lithuania was formed, which consistently destroyed Lithuanian society and political institutions and opened the way for the Communist Party to establish itself. To establish the legitimacy of the government and design the plans of Lithuania's "legal accession to the USSR", on 1 July, the Seimas of Lithuania was dismissed, and elections to the puppet People's Seimas were announced. The controlled (passports had imprints) and falsified elections to the People's Seimas were won by the Lithuanian Labour People's Union, which obeyed the occupiers' proposal to "ask" the Soviet authorities to have Lithuania admitted to the Soviet Union.

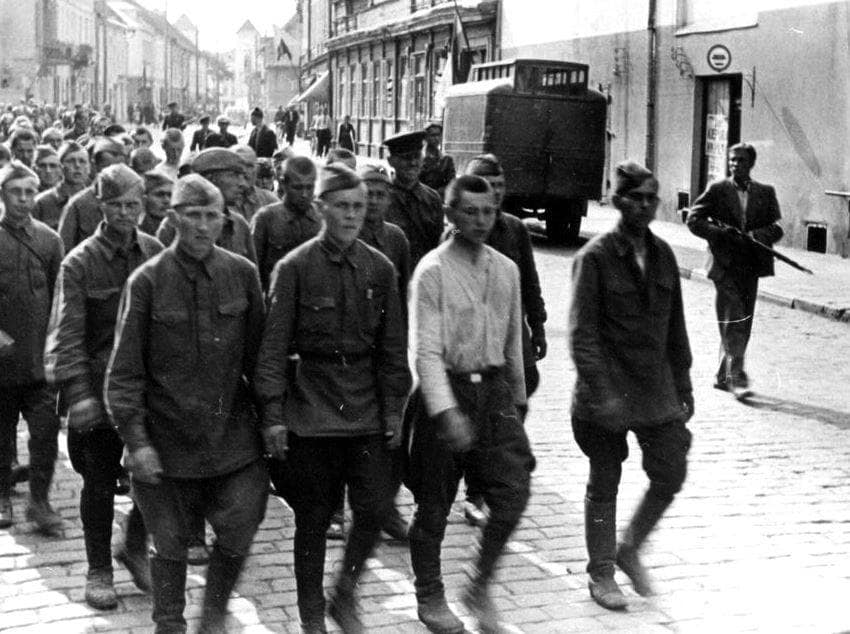
Lithuanian insurgents (LAF) lead the disarmed soldiers of the Red Army in the Vilniaus Street in Kaunas

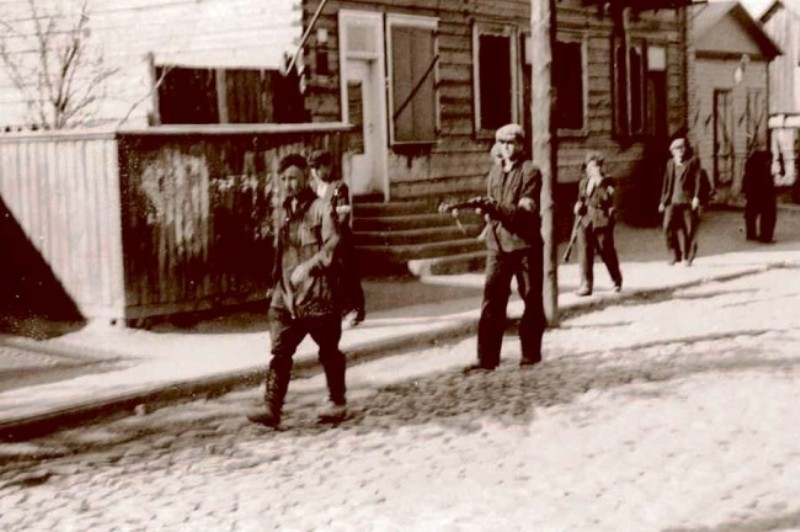
LAF insurgents lead the arrested Commissar of the Red Army in Kaunas

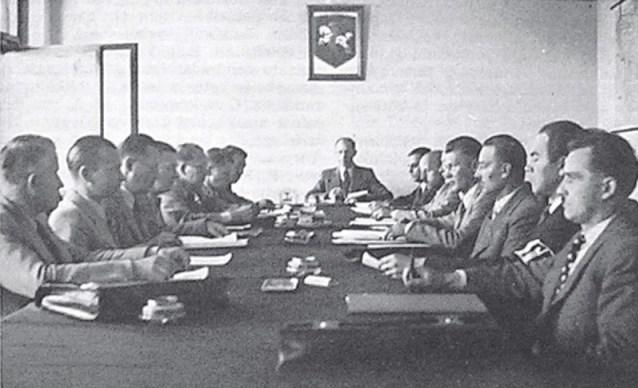
Session of the Provisional Government of Lithuania in Kaunas

After the occupation, the Lithuanian Diplomatic Service did not recognize the new occupiers' authority and started the diplomatic liberation campaign of Lithuania. In 1941, Kazys Škirpa, Leonas Prapuolenis, Juozas Ambrazevičius and their supporters, including the former Commander of the Lithuanian Army General Stasys Raštikis, whose whole family was deported to Siberia, began organizing an uprising. After realizing the reality of the repressive and brutal Soviet rule, in the early morning of 22 June 1941 (the first day when the Nazi Germany attacked the Soviet Union), Lithuanians began the June Uprising, which was organized by the Lithuanian Activist Front, in Kaunas, where its main forces were concentrated. The uprising soon expanded to Vilnius and other locations. Its main goal was not to fight the Soviets but to secure the city from the inside (secure organizations, institutions, enterprises) and declare independence. By the evening of 22 June, the Lithuanians had controlled the Presidential Palace, post office, telephone and telegraph, and radio station. Control of Vilnius and most of the rest of Lithuanian territory was also shortly taken over by the rebels.

Multiple Red Army divisions stationed around Kaunas, including the brutal 1st Motor Rifle Division NKVD responsible for the June deportation, and the puppet Lithuanian Soviet Socialist Republic regime commanders were forced to flee into the Latvian SSR through the Daugava River. The commander of the Red Army's 188th Rifle Division colonel Piotr Ivanov reported to the 11th Army Staff that during the retreat of his division through Kaunas "local counterrevolutionaries from the shelters deliberately fired on the Red Army, the detachments suffering heavy losses of soldiers and military equipment". About 5,000 occupants were killed in Lithuania.

On 23 June 1941 at 9:28 am Tautiška giesmė, the national anthem of Lithuania, was played on the radio in Kaunas. Many people listened to the Lithuanian national anthem with tears in their eyes. From Kaunas radio broadcasts, Lithuania learned that the rebellion was taking place in the country, the insurgents took Kaunas and the Proclamation of the Independence Restoration of Lithuania and the list of the Provisional Government were announced by Leonas Prapuolenis. The message was being repeated several times in different languages. The Provisional Government hoped that Nazi Germany would re-establish Lithuanian independence or at least allow some degree of autonomy (similar to the Slovak Republic), was seeking the protection of its citizens and did not support the Nazis' Holocaust policy. However, the Provisional Government did little to stop the anti-Jewish violence encouraged by the Nazis and the anti-Semitic leadership of the Lithuanian Activist Front.

Minister of National Defence General Stasys Raštikis met personally with the Wehrmacht generals to discuss the situation. He approached the Kaunas War Field Commandant General Oswald Pohl and the Military Command Representative General Karl von Roques by trying to plead for him to spare the Jews, but they replied that the Gestapo is handling those issues and that they could not help. Furthermore, in the beginning of the occupation, the prime minister of the Provisional Government of Lithuania, Juozas Ambrazevičius, convened the meeting in which the ministers participated together with the former President Kazys Grinius, Bishop Vincentas Brizgys and others. Ministers expressed distress at the atrocities being committed against the Jews but advised only that "despite all the measures which must be taken against the Jews for their Communist activity and harm done to the German Army, partisans and individuals should avoid public executions of Jews". According to the Lithuanian-American Holocaust historian Saulius Sužiedėlis, "none of this amounted to a public scolding which alone could have persuaded at least some of the Lithuanians who had volunteered or been co-opted into participating in the killings to rethink their behavior." Lithuanian police battalions formed by the Provisional Government were eventually enlisted by the Nazis to help carry out the Holocaust.

In the first issue of the daily Į laisvę (Towards Freedom) newspaper, the Independence Restoration Declaration was published, which had been previously announced on the radio. It stated that "The established Provisional Government of revived Lithuania declares the restoration of the Free and Independent State of Lithuania. The young Lithuanian state enthusiastically pledges to contribute to the organization of Europe on a new basis in front of the whole world innocent conscience. The Lithuanian Nation, exhausted from the terror of the brutal Bolsheviks, decided to build its future on the basis of national unity and social justice." and signatures.

On 24 June 1941, tank units of the Red Army in Jonava were ordered to retake Kaunas. The rebels radioed the Germans for assistance. The units were bombed by the Luftwaffe and did not reach the city. It was the first coordinated Lithuanian–German action. The first German scouts, lieutenant Flohret and four privates, entered Kaunas on 24 June and found it in friendly hands. A day later the main forces marched into the city without obstruction and almost as if they were on parade.

=== German occupation and murder of Jews ===
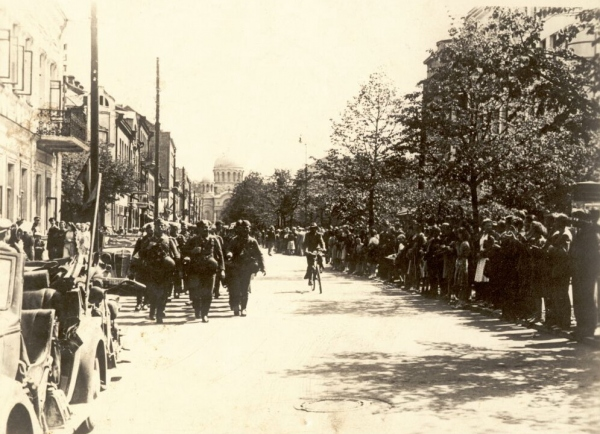
Wehrmacht soldiers marching through the Liberty Avenue in Kaunas

On 26 June 1941 the German Oberkommando der Wehrmacht ordered the rebel groups to disband and disarm. Two days later Lithuanian guards and patrols were also relieved of their duties. In July, the Tilsit Nazi Gestapo agent Heinz Gräfe stated to Stasys Raštikis that the Provisional Government was formed without German knowledge and was unacceptable to the Germans, and that the current Provisional Government should be transformed into a National Committee or Council under the German military authority. The Nazi Germans did not recognize the new Provisional Government, but they did not take any action to dissolve it. The Provisional Government, not agreeing to continue to be an instrument of the German occupiers, disbanded itself on 5 August 1941 after signing a protest for the Germans action of suspending the Lithuanian Government powers. Members of the Provisional Government then went as a body to the Garden of the Vytautas the Great War Museum, where they laid a wreath near the Tomb of the Unknown Soldier in the presence of numerous audience. The Sicherheitsdienst confiscated the pictures of the wreath-laying ceremony, thinking that it could be dangerous for the German occupation policy in Lithuania.

On 17 July 1941, the German civil administration was established. The government's powers were taken over by the new occupiers. Nazi Germany established the Reichskommissariat Ostland in the Baltic states and much of Belarus, and the administrative centre for Lithuania (Generalbezirk Litauen) was established in Kaunas, ruled by Generalkommissar Theodor Adrian von Renteln.

=== Jewish community of Kaunas ===
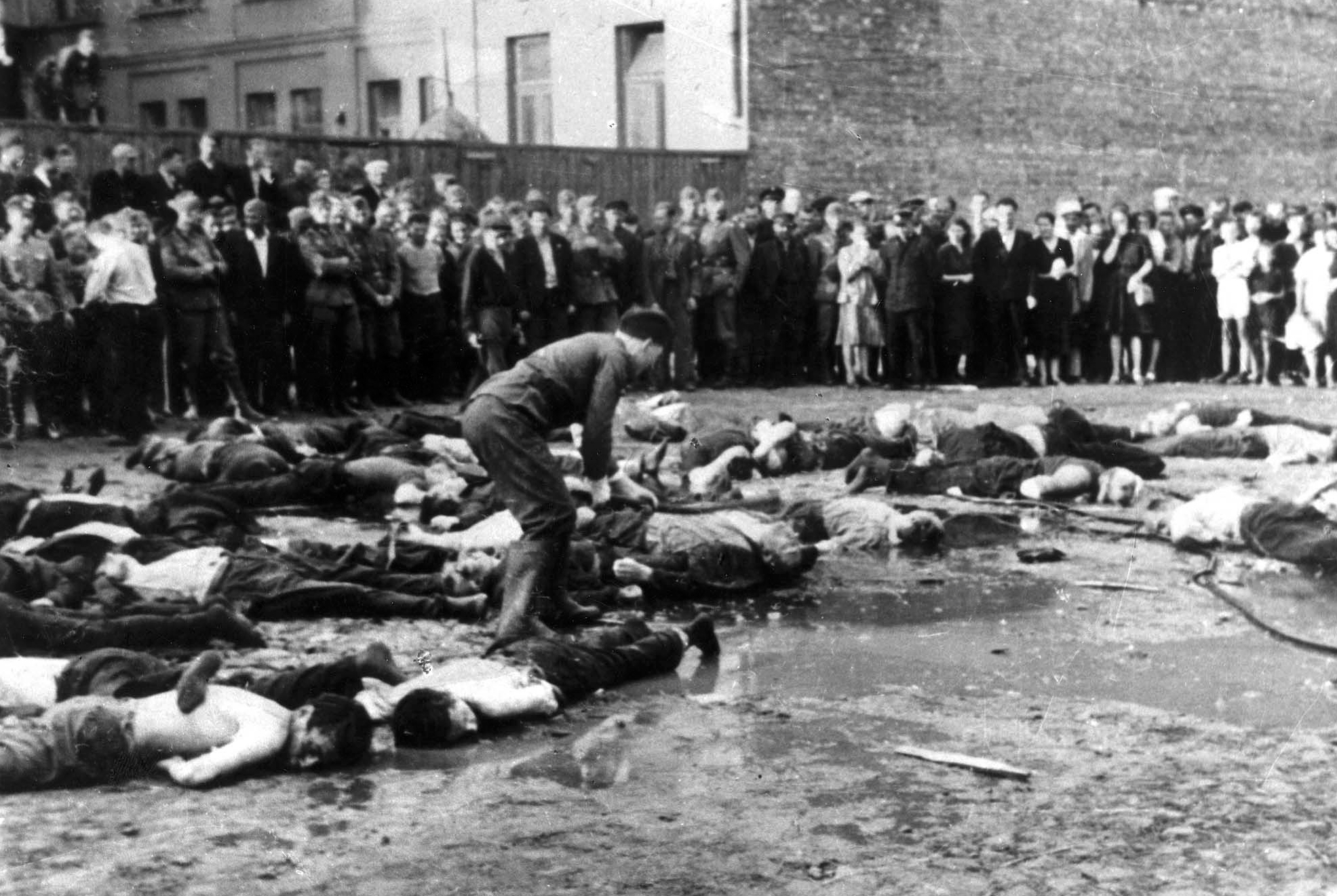
Massacre of Jews in Lietūkis Garage, June 1941, Lithuania, part of the Kaunas pogrom

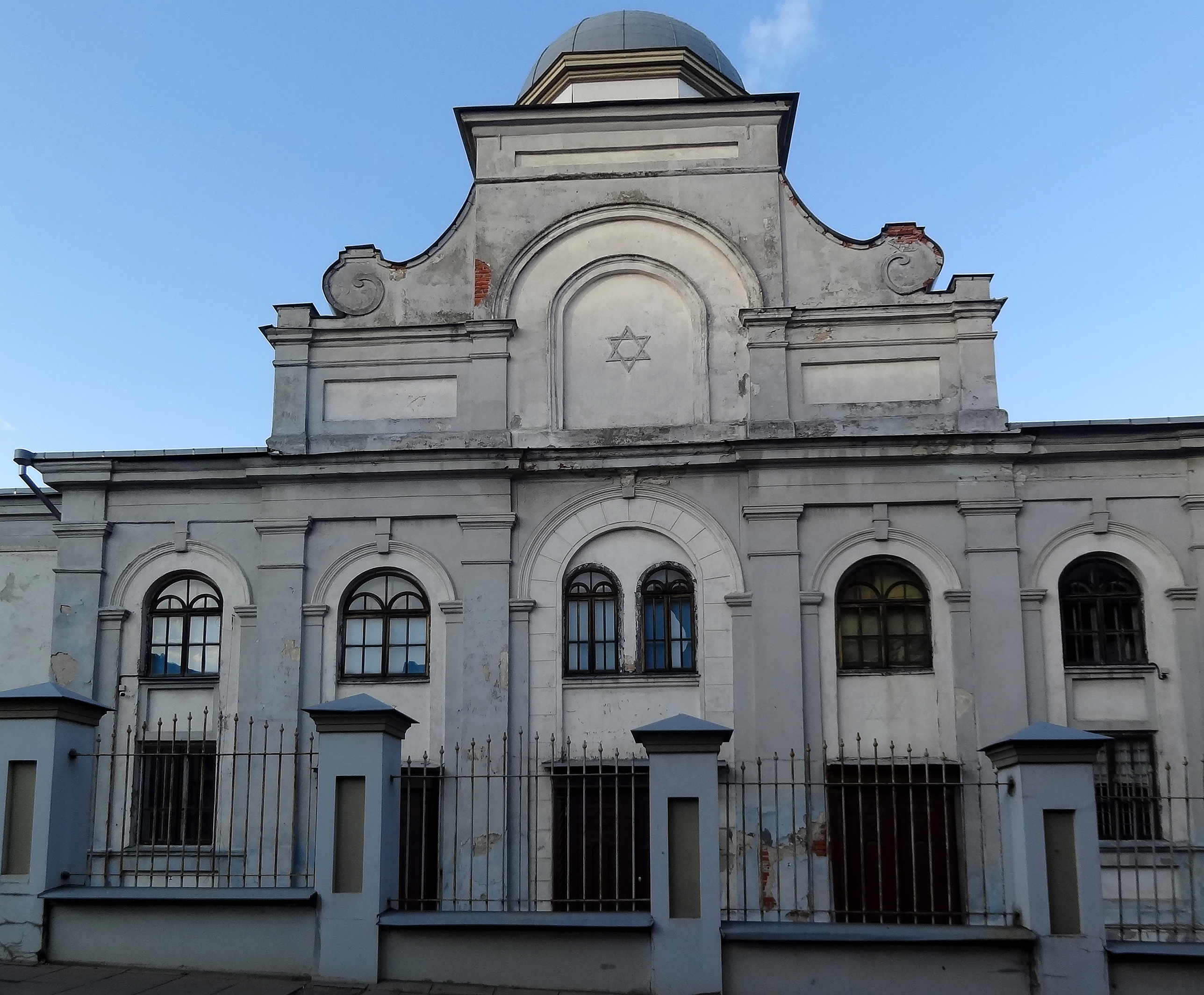
Façade of the Kaunas Choral Synagogue

Jews began settling in Kaunas in the second half of the 17th century. They were not allowed to live in the city, so most of them stayed in the Vilijampolė settlement on the right bank of the Neris river. Jewish life in Kaunas was first disrupted when the Soviet Union occupied Lithuania in June 1940. The occupation was accompanied by arrests, confiscations, and the elimination of all free institutions. Jewish community organizations disappeared almost overnight. Soviet authorities confiscated the property of many Jews, while hundreds were exiled to Siberia.

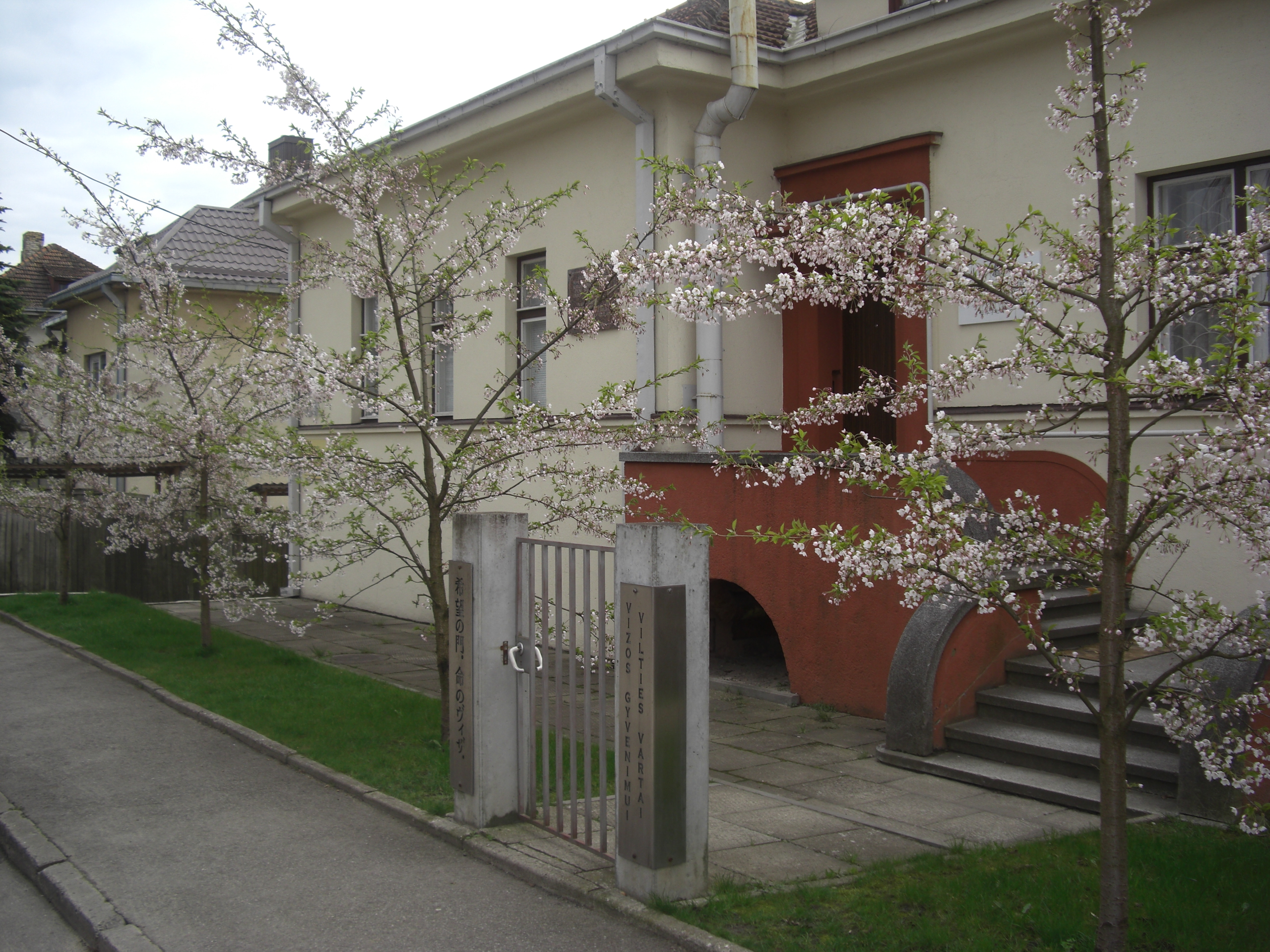
Chiune Sugihara House in Kaunas

As the Second World War began, there were 30,000 Jews living in Kaunas, comprising about 25% of the city's population. When the Soviet Union took over Lithuania in 1940, some Jewish Dutch residents in Lithuania approached the Dutch consul Jan Zwartendijk to get a visa to the Dutch West Indies. Zwartendijk agreed to help them and Jews who had fled from German-occupied Poland also sought his assistance. In a few days, with the help of aides, Zwartendijk produced over 2,200 visas for Jews to Curaçao. Then refugees approached Chiune Sugihara, a Japanese consul, who gave them a transit visa through the USSR to Japan, against the disapproval of his government. This gave many refugees an opportunity to leave Lithuania for the Russian Far East via the Trans-Siberian Railway. The fleeing Jews were refugees from German-occupied Western Poland and Soviet-occupied Eastern Poland, as well as residents of Kaunas and other Lithuania territories. The Sugihara House, where he was previously issuing transit visas, currently is a museum and the Centre For Asian Studies of Vytautas Magnus University.

Following Hitler's invasion of the Soviet Union on 22 June 1941and the fleeing of Soviet forces the anti-Communists, encouraged by the anti-Semitic leadership of the Berlin-based Lithuanian Activist Front (LAF), began to attack Jews, blaming them for the Soviet repressions, especially along Jurbarko and Kriščiukaičio streets. The LAF's manifesto-type essay "What Are the Activists Fighting for?" states: "The Lithuanian Activist Front, by restoring the new Lithuania, is determined to carry out an immediate and fundamental purging of the Lithuanian nation and its land of Jews ...". Nazi authorities took advantage of the Lithuanian TDA Battalions and established a concentration camp at the Seventh Fort, one of the city's ten historic forts, and 4,000 Jews were rounded up and murdered there.

=== Pogroms in Kaunas ===
The Kaunas pogrom was the largest single massacre of Jewish people living in Kaunas that took place in a single day, 29 June 1941. Over 9200 people, including men, women and children were murdered. Prior to the construction of the Ninth Fort museum on the site, archaeologists unearthed a mass grave and personal belongings of the Jewish victims. The Ninth Fortress has been renovated into a memorial for the wars and is the site where nearly 50,000 Lithuanians were killed during Nazi occupation. Of these deaths, over 30,000 were Jews.

=== Soviet administration ===
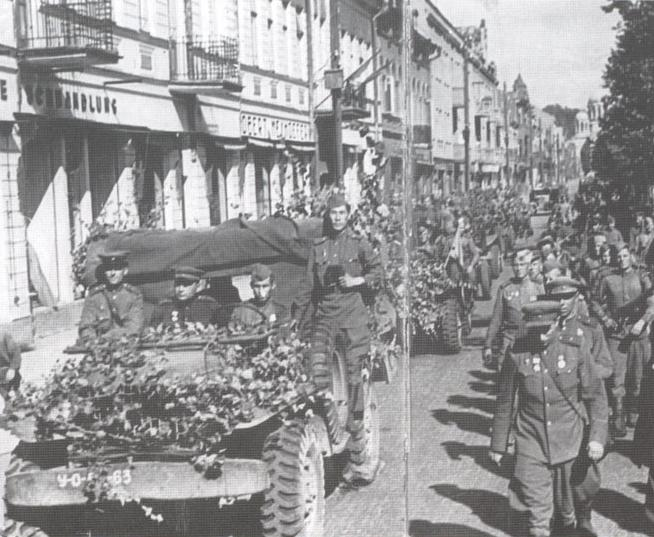
Soldiers of the Red Army in the Liberty Avenue during the World War II

Beginning in 1944, the Red Army began offensives that eventually led to the reconquest of all three of the Baltic states. Kaunas was captured on 1 August 1944 and this led to the continuation of Soviet repressions. Kaunas again became the major centre of resistance against the Soviet Union. From the very start of the Lithuanian partisans war, the most important partisan districts were based around Kaunas. Although guerrilla warfare ended by 1953, Lithuanian opposition to Soviet rule did not. In 1956 people in the Kaunas region supported the uprising in Hungary by rioting.

On All Souls' Day in 1956, the first public anti-Soviet protest rally took place in Kaunas: citizens burned candles in the Kaunas military cemetery and sang national songs, resulting in clashes with the Militsiya.

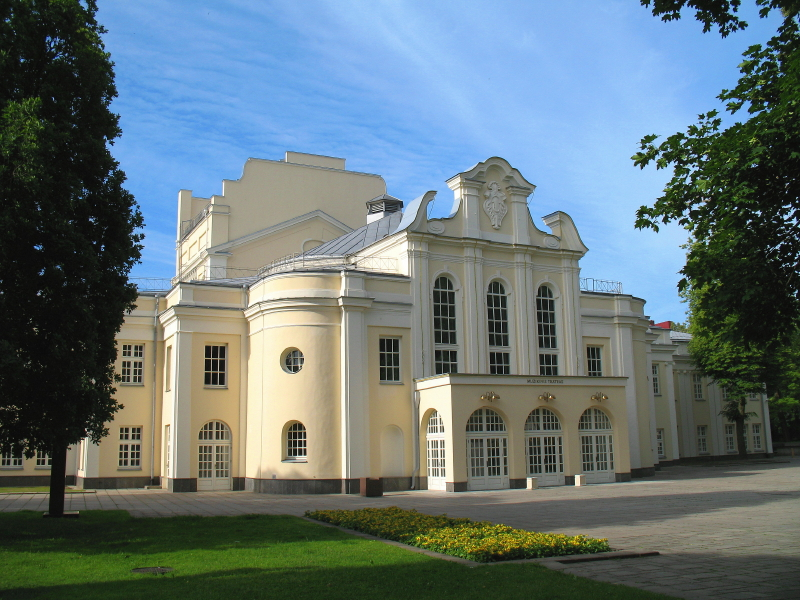
Romas Kalanta self-immolated close to Kaunas State Musical Theatre protesting against the Soviet regime

On 14 May 1972, 19-year-old Romas Kalanta, having proclaimed "Freedom for Lithuania!", immolated himself in the garden of the Musical Theatre, after making a speech denouncing the Soviet suppression of national and religious rights. The event broke into a politically charged riot, which was forcibly dispersed by the KGB and Militsiya. It led to new forms of resistance: passive resistance all around Lithuania. The continuous oppression of the Catholic Church and its resistance caused the appearance of the Chronicle of the Catholic Church in Lithuania. In strict conspiracy, Catholic priest Sigitas Tamkevičius (now the Archbishop Metropolitan of Kaunas) implemented this idea and its first issue was published in the Alytus district on 19 March 1972. The Kronika started a new phase of resistance in the life of Lithuania's Catholic Church and of all Lithuania fighting against the occupation by making known to the world the violation of the human rights and freedoms in Lithuania for almost two decades.

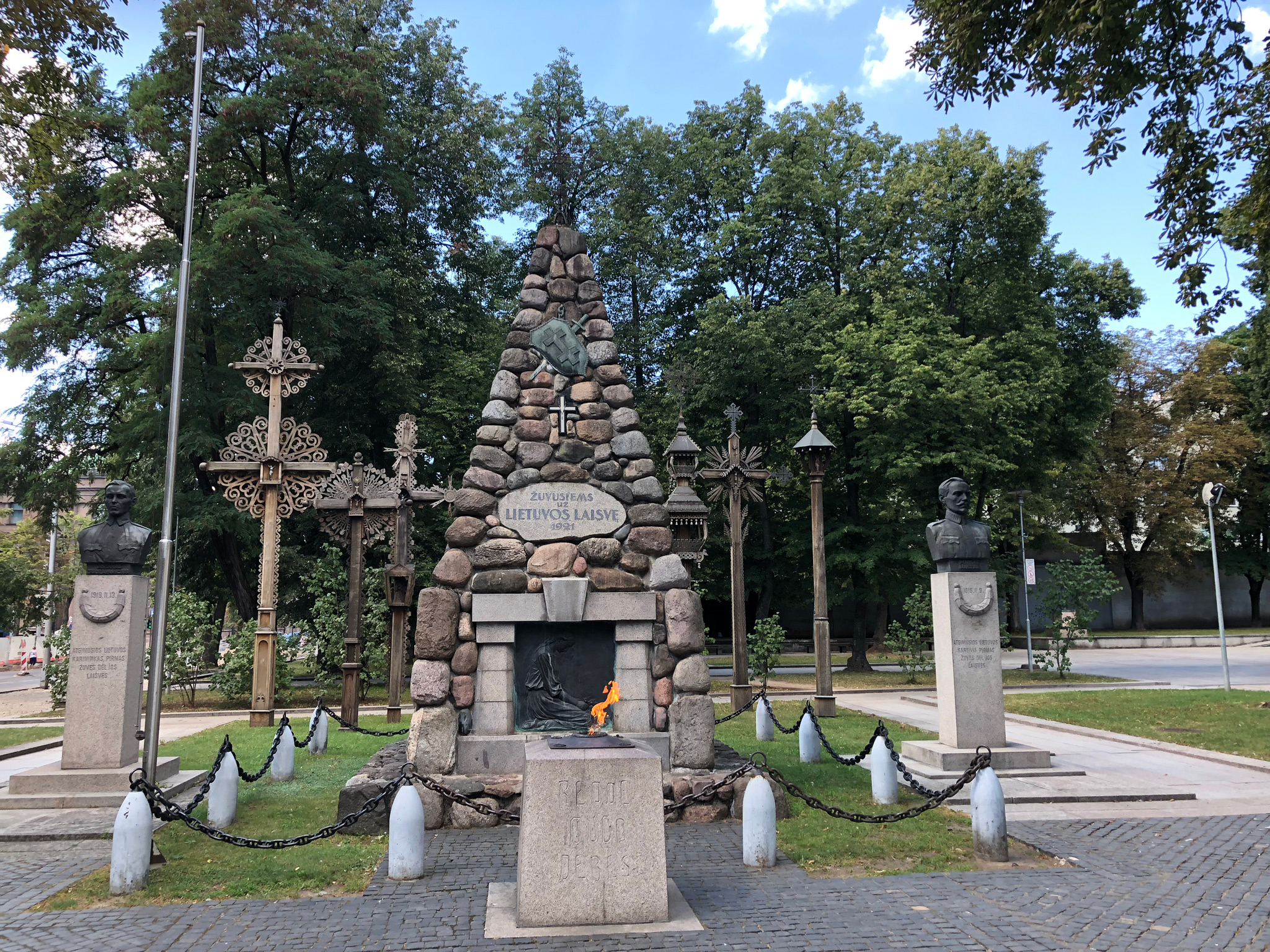
Monument in the Vienybės aikštė (Unity Square) with an eternal flame, dedicated to those who died for Lithuania's freedom

On 1 November 1987, a non-sanctioned rally took place near the Kaunas Archcathedral Basilica, where people gathered to mark famous Lithuanian poet Maironis's 125th-birthday anniversary. On 10 June 1988, the initiating group of the Kaunas movement of Sąjūdis was formed. On 9 October 1988, the Flag of Lithuania was raised above the tower of the Military Museum. Kaunas, along with Vilnius, became the scene of nearly constant demonstrations as the Lithuanians, embarked on a process of self-discovery. The bodies of Lithuanians who died in Siberian exile were brought back to their homeland for reburial, and the anniversaries of deportations as well as the important dates in Lithuanian history began to be noted with speeches and demonstrations.

On 16 February 1989 Cardinal Vincentas Sladkevičius, for the first time, called for the independence of Lithuania in his sermon at the Kaunas Cathedral. After the services, 200,000 persons gathered in the centre of Kaunas to participate in the dedication of a new monument to freedom to replace the monument that had been torn down by the Soviet authorities after World War II.

=== Restored independence ===
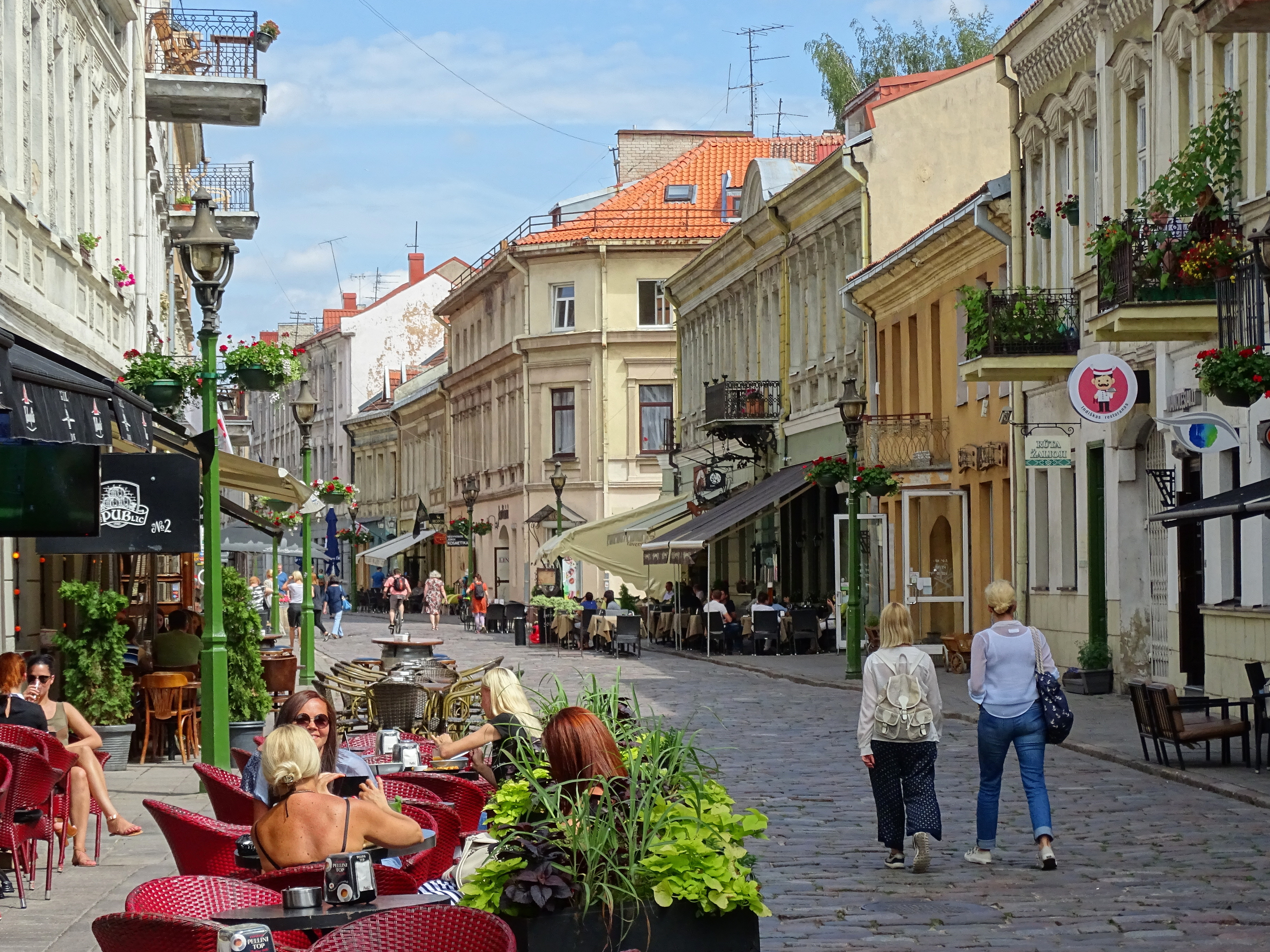
Cafés in the Kaunas Old Town

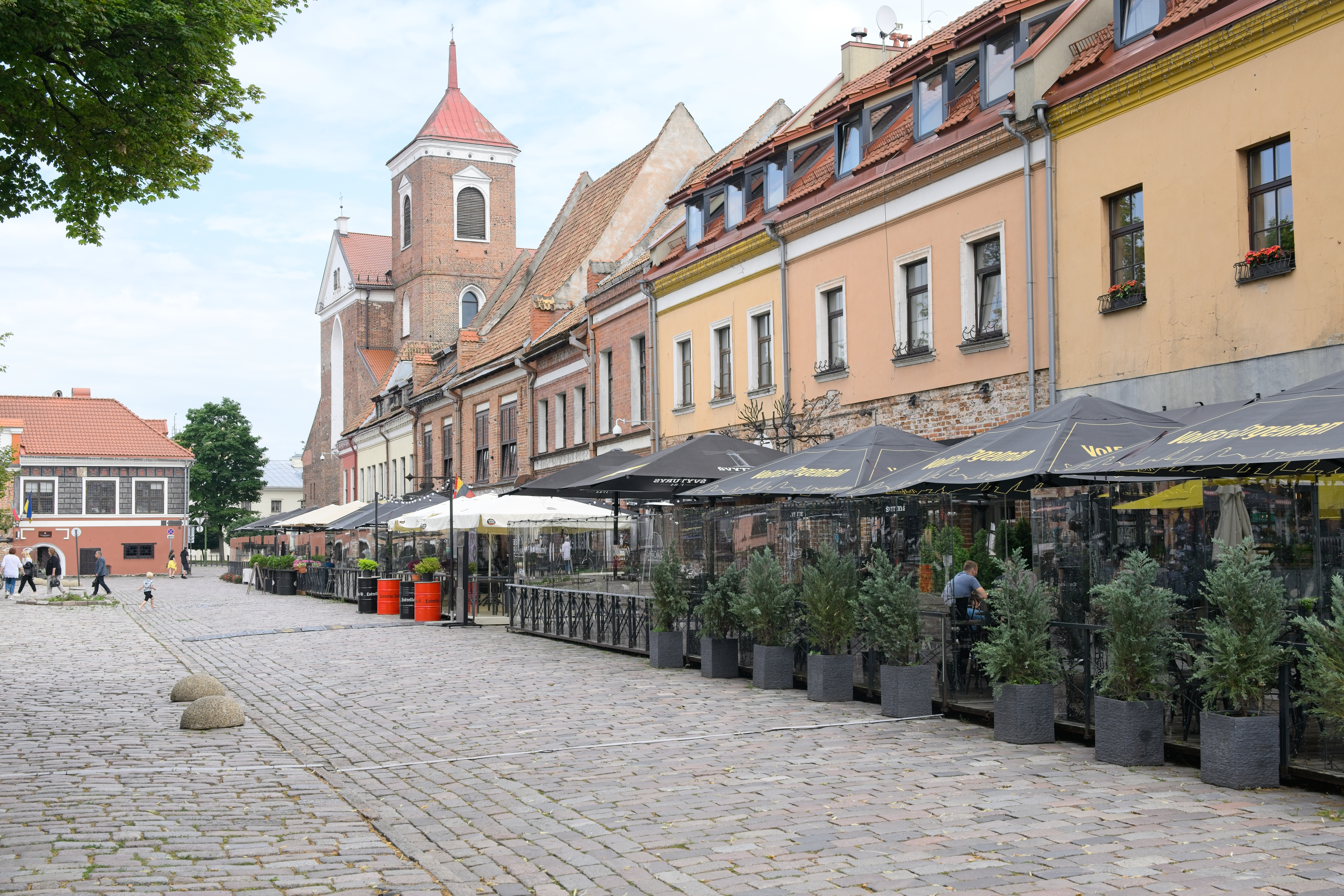
Kaunas Town Hall Square

After World War II Kaunas became the main industrial city of Lithuania; it produced about a quarter of Lithuania's industrial output.

After the proclamation of Lithuanian independence in 1990, Soviet attempts to suppress the rebellion focused on the Sitkūnai Radio Station. They were defended by the citizenry of Kaunas. Pope John Paul II said Holy Mass for the faithful of the Archdiocese of Kaunas at the Kaunas Archcathedral Basilica and held a meeting with the young people of Lithuania at the S. Darius and S. Girėnas Stadium, during his visit to Lithuania in 1993. Kaunas natives Vytautas Landsbergis and Valdas Adamkus became the head of state in 1990 and, respectively, in 1998 and 2004. One of the most visible symbols of the post-Soviet transition is the unfinished Hotel Britanika, a late-Soviet high-rise partially constructed in the 1980s that remained abandoned for decades after independence. Since the restoration of independence, substantially improved air and land transport links with Western Europe have made Kaunas easily accessible to foreign tourists.

Kaunas is famous for its basketball club, Žalgiris, which was founded in 1944 and was one of the most popular nonviolent expressions of resistance during its struggle with the CSKA Moscow. In 2011, the largest indoor arena in the Baltic states was built and was named Žalgiris Arena. Kaunas hosted finals of the EuroBasket 2011.

In March 2015, Kaunas's interwar buildings received the European Heritage Label.

On 29 March 2017, Kaunas was named European Capital of Culture of 2022.

On 28 September 2017, the winner of the M. K. Čiurlionis Concert Centre architectural competition was announced and the centre was planned to be completed by 2022, close to the Vytautas the Great Bridge.

On 18 September 2023, Kaunas's interwar modern architecture was included in the list of the UNESCO World Heritage Sites.

== Geography ==
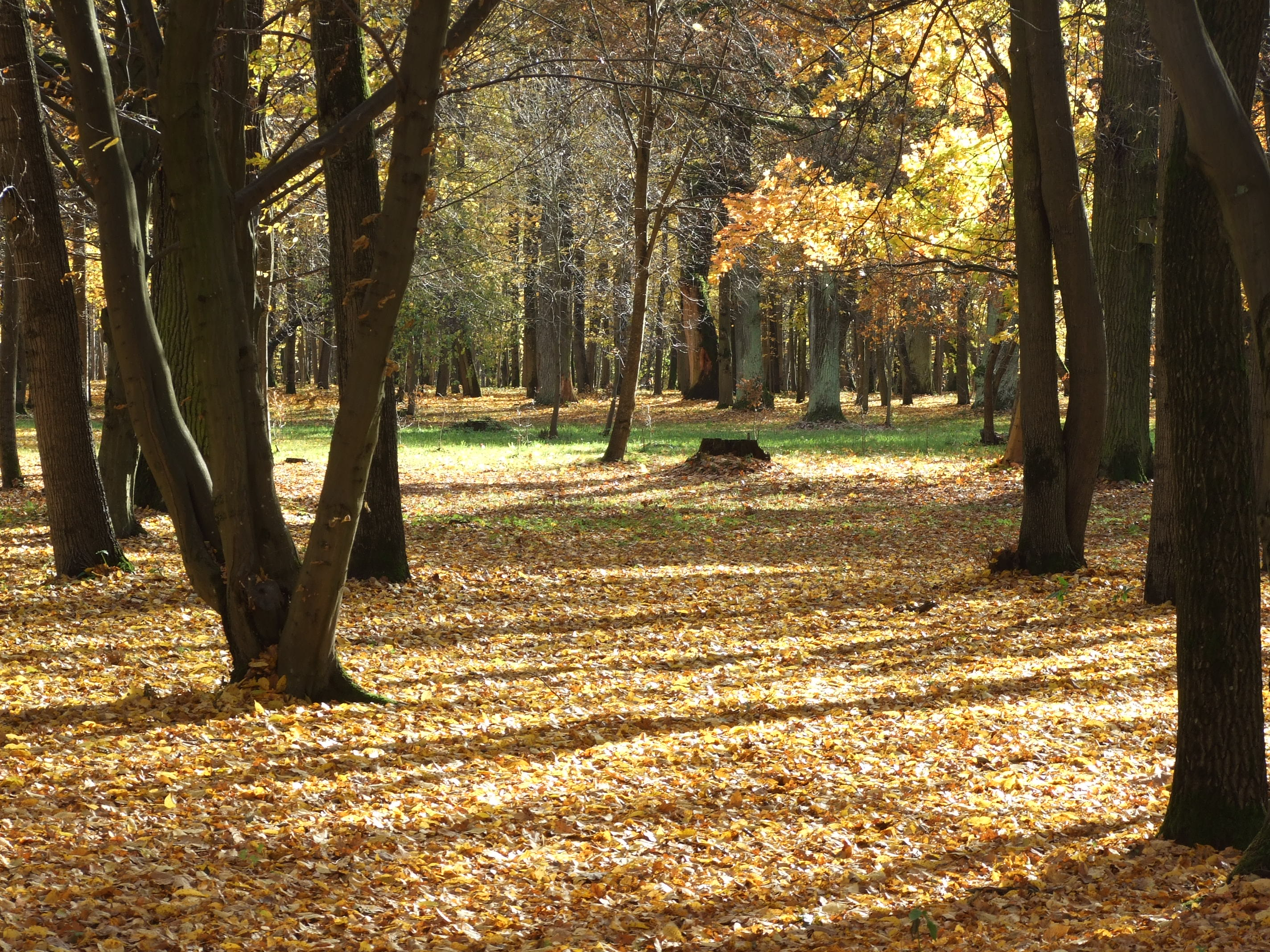
Ąžuolynas is the largest urban stand of mature oaks in Europe (ranging in age from 100 to 320 years old), and a very popular recreational destination

Vienybės aikštė (Unity Square) after the 2017–2020 redevelopment, which is the first project in Lithuania to win the prestigious iF Design Award

The city covers 15,700 hectares. Parks, groves, gardens, nature reserves, and agricultural areas occupy 8,329 hectares. The city follows in suit of the country and is lowland. Kaunas is known for its landscape complexes of rivers and stream valleys as the city is located at the confluence of Neris and Nemunas rivers.

In Kaunas there are 16 urban parks (Ąžuolyno, A.Šančių ąžuolynas, Dainavos, Draugystės, Kalniečių, Santakos, Vilijos, Nepriklausomybės, Santarvės, Marvos dvaro, Girstupio, Gričiupio, Kovo 11-osios, Neries krantinės, Antakalnio g., Sargėnų dvaro) which total territory is 1080 hectares. Moreover, there are three forest parks (Panemunės, Kleboniškio, Lampėdžių), three landscape reserves (Jiesios, Veršvos, Nevėžio), one regional park (Kauno Marios Regional Park), five teriological reserves, and one ornithological reserve.

In Kaunas and its surrounding area there are 43 mineral deposits that are suitable for extracting: anhydrite and gypsum, sand and gravel, freshwater limestone, clay, chalk marl, peat, and mineral water.

== Administrative divisions ==
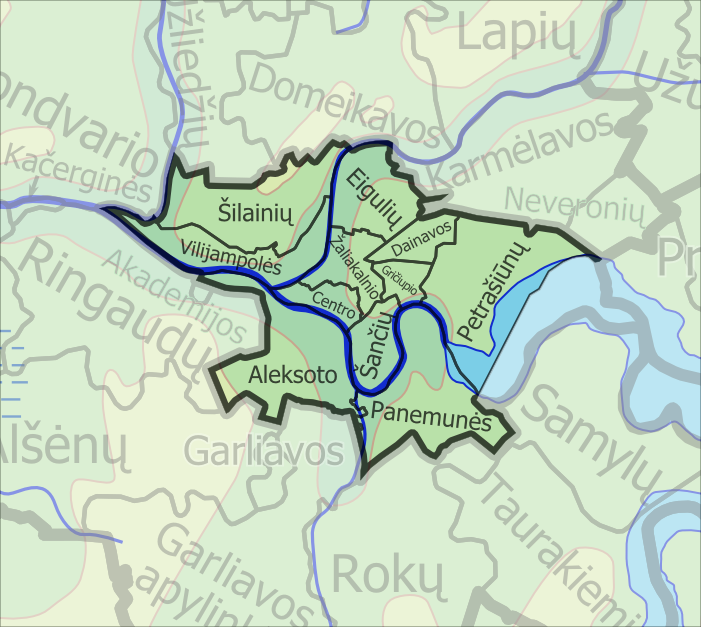
Elderships of Kaunas

Kaunas is divided into the following elderships:

Eldership	Area	Population (2021)	Population density (per km^{2})
Aleksotas	24 km^{2} (5,930.53 acres; 9.27 sq mi)	21,390	890
Centras	4.6 km^{2} (1,136.68 acres; 1.78 sq mi)	14,356	3,100
Dainava	5.3 km^{2} (1,309.66 acres; 2.05 sq mi)	53,053	10,000
Eiguliai	14.5 km^{2} (3,583.03 acres; 5.60 sq mi)	39,371	2,700
Gričiupis	3.8 km^{2} (939.00 acres; 1.47 sq mi)	23,894	6,300
Panemunė	24.8 km^{2} (6,128.21 acres; 9.58 sq mi)	14,888	600
Petrašiūnai	28.5 km^{2} (7,042.50 acres; 11.00 sq mi)	12,835	450
Šančiai	7.4 km^{2} (1,828.58 acres; 2.86 sq mi)	18,954	2,600
Šilainiai	25.3 km^{2} (6,251.77 acres; 9.77 sq mi)	55,125	2,200
Vilijampolė	14.4 km^{2} (3,558.32 acres; 5.56 sq mi)	23,687	1,600
Žaliakalnis	7.4 km^{2} (1,828.58 acres; 2.86 sq mi)	21,200	2,900

== Climate ==
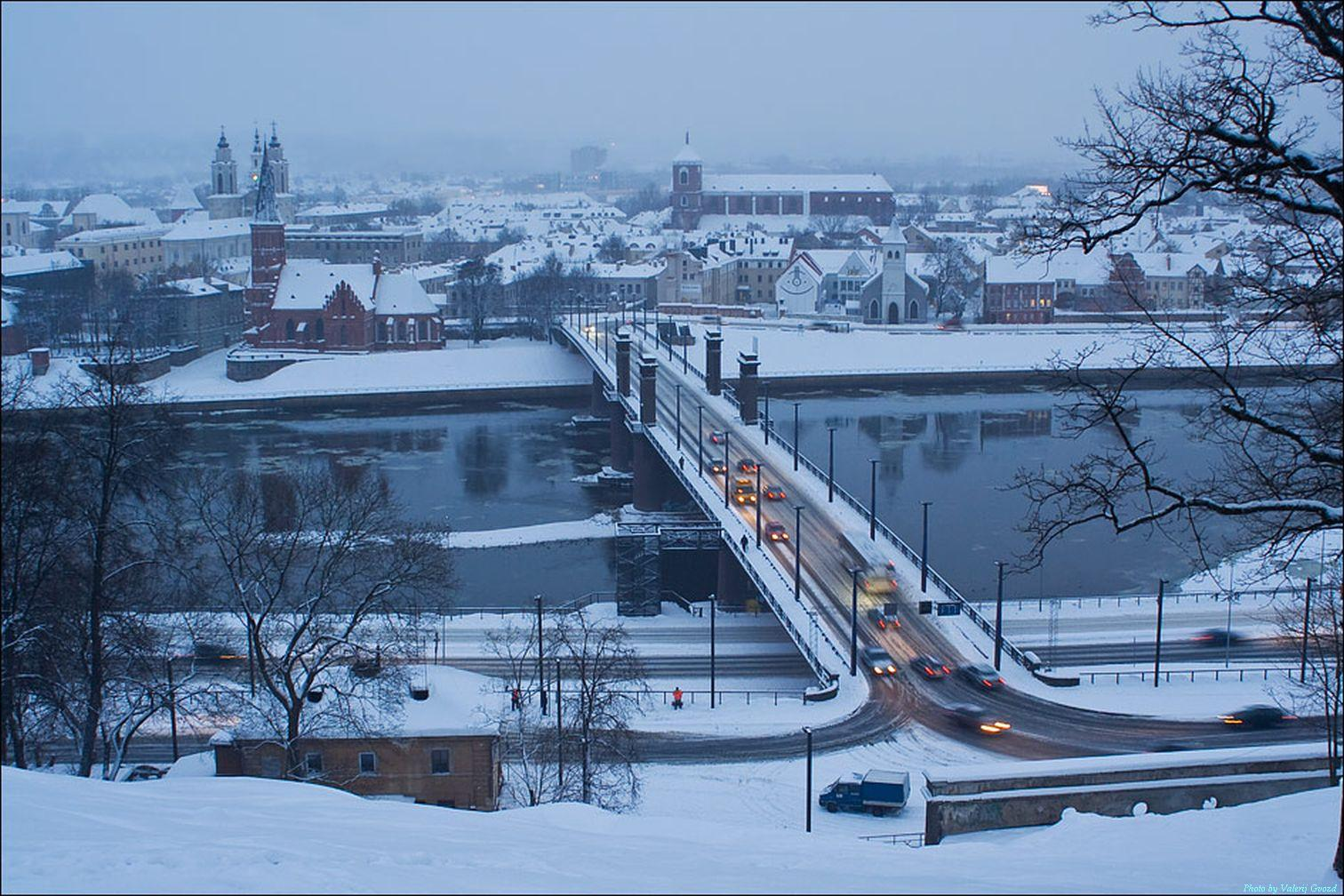
Snowy winter landscape in Kaunas

Kaunas has a humid continental climate (Köppen climate classification Dfb) with an average annual temperature of approximately 7 °C (45 °F).

Despite its northern location, the climate in Kaunas is relatively mild compared to other locations at similar latitudes, mainly because of the Baltic Sea. Because of its latitude, Kaunas has 17 hours of daylight in midsummer but only around 7 hours in midwinter. The Kazlų Rūda Forest, west of Kaunas, creates a microclimate around the city, regulating humidity and temperature of the air, and protecting it from strong westerly winds.

Summers in Kaunas are warm and pleasant with average daytime high temperatures of 21–22 °C (70–72 °F) and lows of around 12 °C (54 °F), but temperatures could reach 30 °C (86 °F) on some days. Winters are relatively cold, and sometimes snowy with average temperatures ranging from −8 to 0 °C (18 to 32 °F), and rarely drop below −15 °C (5 °F). Spring and autumn are generally cool to mild temperature wise.

Climate data for Kaunas (1991–2020 normals, extremes 1901-present)
Month	Jan	Feb	Mar	Apr	May	Jun	Jul	Aug	Sep	Oct	Nov	Dec	Year
Record high °C (°F)	13.9 (57.0)	14.8 (58.6)	23.8 (74.8)	28.6 (83.5)	31.4 (88.5)	34.6 (94.3)	34.9 (94.8)	35.3 (95.5)	33.3 (91.9)	23.9 (75.0)	16.7 (62.1)	11.1 (52.0)	35.3 (95.5)
Mean maximum °C (°F)	5.8 (42.4)	6.3 (43.3)	12.8 (55.0)	22.5 (72.5)	26.5 (79.7)	28.2 (82.8)	30.7 (87.3)	30.5 (86.9)	25.3 (77.5)	18.3 (64.9)	11.4 (52.5)	6.7 (44.1)	32.0 (89.6)
Mean daily maximum °C (°F)	−0.8 (30.6)	0.3 (32.5)	5.0 (41.0)	12.9 (55.2)	18.7 (65.7)	21.7 (71.1)	23.5 (74.3)	23.5 (74.3)	17.9 (64.2)	10.9 (51.6)	4.7 (40.5)	0.7 (33.3)	11.6 (52.9)
Daily mean °C (°F)	−3.5 (25.7)	−2.9 (26.8)	1.2 (34.2)	7.6 (45.7)	13.0 (55.4)	16.3 (61.3)	18.0 (64.4)	17.8 (64.0)	12.9 (55.2)	7.2 (45.0)	2.6 (36.7)	−1.2 (29.8)	7.5 (45.5)
Mean daily minimum °C (°F)	−6.1 (21.0)	−6.0 (21.2)	−2.1 (28.2)	2.8 (37.0)	7.5 (45.5)	11.0 (51.8)	13.0 (55.4)	12.8 (55.0)	8.8 (47.8)	4.2 (39.6)	0.6 (33.1)	−3.3 (26.1)	3.8 (38.8)
Mean minimum °C (°F)	−19.0 (−2.2)	−17.0 (1.4)	−9.9 (14.2)	−3.4 (25.9)	0.6 (33.1)	5.0 (41.0)	8.3 (46.9)	7.0 (44.6)	1.5 (34.7)	−2.9 (26.8)	−7.0 (19.4)	−12.2 (10.0)	−21.3 (−6.3)
Record low °C (°F)	−35.8 (−32.4)	−36.3 (−33.3)	−26.3 (−15.3)	−12.0 (10.4)	−3.7 (25.3)	0.1 (32.2)	2.1 (35.8)	0.3 (32.5)	−3.0 (26.6)	−13.7 (7.3)	−21.0 (−5.8)	−30.6 (−23.1)	−36.3 (−33.3)
Average precipitation mm (inches)	48 (1.9)	38 (1.5)	38 (1.5)	38 (1.5)	53 (2.1)	65 (2.6)	88 (3.5)	77 (3.0)	51 (2.0)	61 (2.4)	47 (1.9)	47 (1.9)	651 (25.6)
Average precipitation days	12.29	10.77	10.40	8.50	9.25	10.76	10.72	10.51	8.46	10.76	10.65	11.21	124.53
Average relative humidity (%)	88	86	79	70	68	72	74	75	80	85	89	90	80
Average dew point °C (°F)	−5 (23)	−5 (23)	−3 (27)	1 (34)	7 (45)	11 (52)	13 (55)	13 (55)	9 (48)	5 (41)	1 (34)	−3 (27)	4 (39)
Mean monthly sunshine hours	42.1	63.4	141.8	205.5	275.0	272.5	277.1	254.6	176.0	106.0	37.7	32.3	1,884
Source 1: Lithuanian Hydrometeorological Service, World Meteorological Organization (average records high & low), NOAA (extremes)
Source 2: Météo Climat (precipitation days), Time and Date (dewpoints, 1985-2015)

== Religion ==
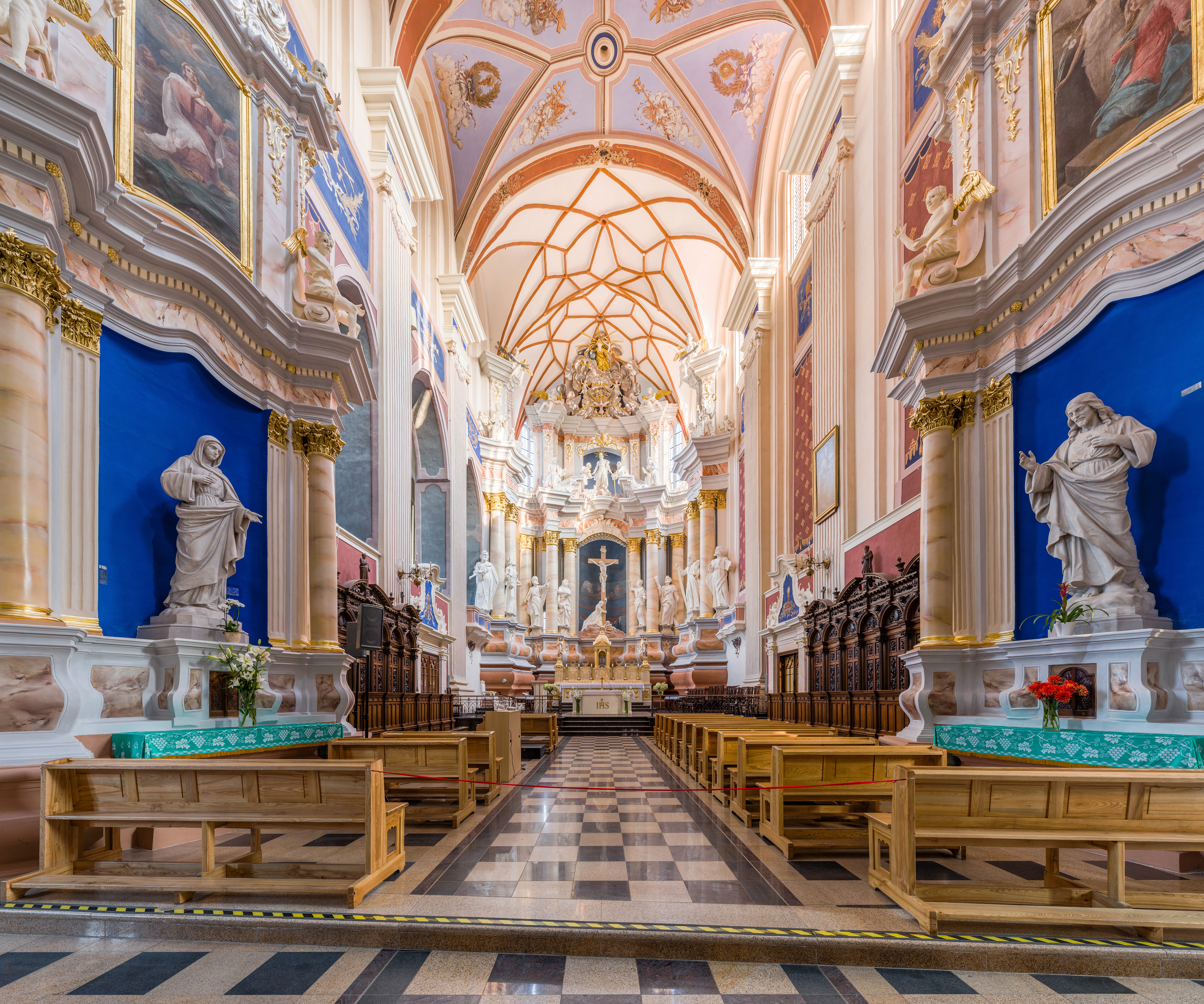
Kaunas Archcathedral Basilica is the religious center of Catholics in Kaunas

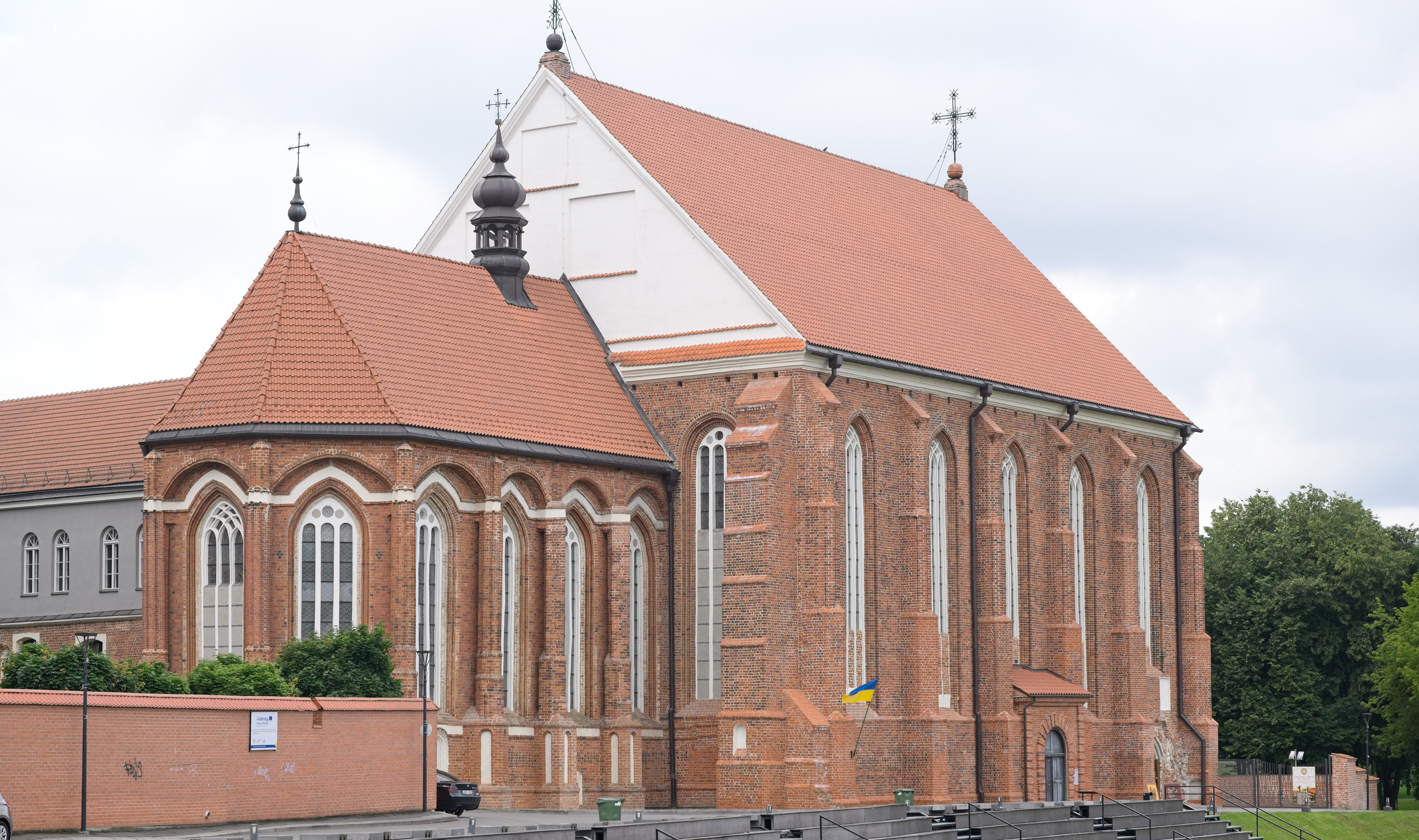
Church of St. George the Martyr, built in the 15th–16th centuries from red bricks near Kaunas Castle

Kaunas Mosque is the only brick mosque in Lithuania. To this day, it is still used by the Lipka Tatars, who were settled in Lithuania by Vytautas the Great during the Middle Ages.

Following the Christianization of Lithuania in 1387 which marked the Lithuanians' shift from the Lithuanian paganism to Catholicism, Grand Duke Vytautas the Great in ~1400 had funded the establishment of the Church of Vytautas the Great to possibly give thanks to the God for saving his life during the Battle of the Vorskla River in 1399. Subsequently, in a period before 1413, Vytautas the Great established a parish church of St. Peter which in the 15th century already had the highest status in Kaunas and is the basis of the Cathedral Basilica of Apostles St. Peter and St. Paul. In 1471, the Church of St. George the Martyr and Bernardines Monastery was funded and were wooden, the Bernardine monks constantly had preachers in the Lithuanian language to attract Lithuanian-speaking townspeople of Kaunas and soon gained popularity, while in the 15th–16th centuries the church and the monastery were rebuilt using bricks. Other surviving 15th century Catholic churches in Kaunas are the Church of Saint Nicholas and Church of St. Gertrude. In 1558, the Lutherans established their first parish in Kaunas and their masses were held in a small church near Town Hall Square, however the church was damaged by fire and in 1682–1683 the Kaunas Lutheran Holy Trinity Church was built.

In the early 17th century the Church of Apostles St. Peter and St. Paul became the center of Kaunas Deanery of the Vilnius Diocese, but the occupations of Kaunas by Muscovites (1655), Swedes (1707) and a fire in 1732 damaged the church, thus it gained nowadays interior appearance only after the restoration in the second half of the 18th century. The Jesuits opened their first residence in Kaunas in 1642 and established a chapel in the House of Perkūnas in 1643, while their Church of St. Francis Xavier was constructed in 1666–1720. Moreover, since 1664 Krzysztof Zygmunt Pac funded the construction of the Pažaislis Monastery and the Church of the Visitation, a splendid example of Italian Baroque in Lithuania, dedicated to Camaldolese monks. In the first half of the 17th century the Dominican Order monks arrived in Kaunas and in 1641 Grand Duke Władysław IV Vasa granted a permission for them to build the Church of the Blessed Sacrament and a monastery, both of which were completed in the late 17th century.

Following the Partitions of the Polish–Lithuanian Commonwealth, the Tsarist authorities arbitrarily moved the center of the Diocese of Samogitia from Varniai to Kaunas in 1863, but this was recognized by Pope Leo XIII only in 1883. The Church of Apostles St. Peter and St. Paul was granted cathedral status in 1895; as a result it included the throne of the Bishop of Samogitia and was the highest-status church of Samogitia. The Samogitian Priest Seminary (now Kaunas Priest Seminary) was also moved from Varniai to Kaunas in 1863 and subsequently became one of the centers of the Lithuanian National Revival during the Russification era. In 1862, the Holy Resurrection Orthodox Church was built for Orthodox Russians living in the city. In 1895, Russian Emperor Alexander III ordered the construction of the Neo-Byzantine style Church of St. Michael the Archangel for the use of the Russian Orthodox imperial garrison of the Kaunas Fortress.

After the restoration of Lithuania's statehood in 1918, the Lithuanian Ecclesiastical Province was established by Pope Pius XI in 1926 with a center in Kaunas, while the Cathedral of Apostles St. Peter and St. Paul received the archcathedral status and since then has archbishop's metropolitan throne. During the interwar period the Catholic Church had the status of a national church and its popularity was boosted due to the pro-Lithuanian stances of its priests during Tsarist times. In 1930, the 500th death anniversary of Vytautas the Great was commemorated by building the Kaunas Mosque, which replaced the older mosque which was built in 1906, for the Lipka Tatars who were settled in Lithuania by Vytautas the Great during the Middle Ages. In 1934, the construction of the Christ's Resurrection Church was started as a monument to the Independence of Lithuania.

After the outbreak of the World War II, many priests of the Roman Catholic Archdiocese of Kaunas and Kaunas Priest Seminary were repressed and killed during the Soviet and Nazis occupations of Lithuania, while since the start of the second Soviet occupation in 1944 the religious buildings in Kaunas were nationalized or abolished by the Soviets who also restricted priests and bishops rights. Nevertheless, priests of the Roman Catholic Archdiocese of Kaunas regularly gathered secretly, transmitted information abroad, and since 1972 participated in the publishing of Chronicle of the Catholic Church in Lithuania, which focused on Soviet repressions against Catholics and human rights in Lithuania. In the late 1980s and early 1990s, following the start of the Sąjūdis movement and the restoration of the independence of Lithuania, the returning of the nationalized church property began and church institutions were restored or newly created, while Cardinal Vincentas Sladkevičius was appointed as Archbishop of Kaunas. According to 2023 statistics, the Roman Catholic Archdiocese of Kaunas had ~430,000 residents of who 334,000 were Catholics.

== Culture ==
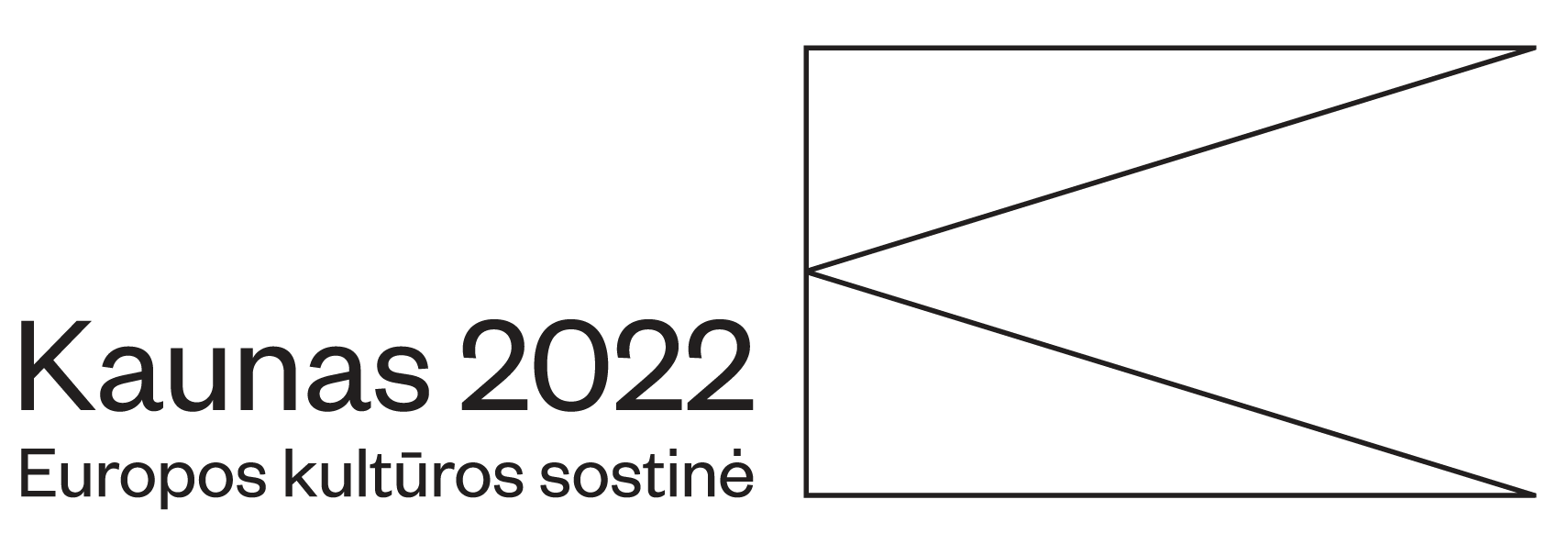
Logo of the 2022 European Capital of Culture

M. K. Čiurlionis National Art Museum

Kaunas is a city centered around culture. The Old Town of Kaunas is located at the confluence of the Nemunas and Neris Rivers where old architectural monuments and other historical buildings are located. Located to the East of the Old Town is the city's New Town, which started developing in 1847 and got its name when it became a distinct part of the city. Central Kaunas is defined by two pedestrian streets: the 1.6 km long Laisvės alėja (Liberty Avenue), a central street of the city, lined by linden trees and decorated with flower beds.

The Old Town is the historical center of Kaunas. The streets in Old Town have been turned to pedestrian sidewalks, so it is best to tour the place by foot. Prominent features of the Old Town include Kaunas Castle, the Town Hall, and the historical Presidential Palace. The Town Hall in Kaunas played an important role in the Medieval Times as a center for trade, festivals, and criminals were brought here for punishment. The Town Hall was originally built with wooden frames, however, after numerous fires in 1542 they began to construct buildings with stone. The stone buildings, however, also burned down, so the Town Hall that stands today was constructed in a more advanced way, which took from 1771 to 1780. The Town Hall is still a center of culture today, it holds weddings and is the home of the Museum of Ceramics.

Other historical, cultural features of Kaunas include:

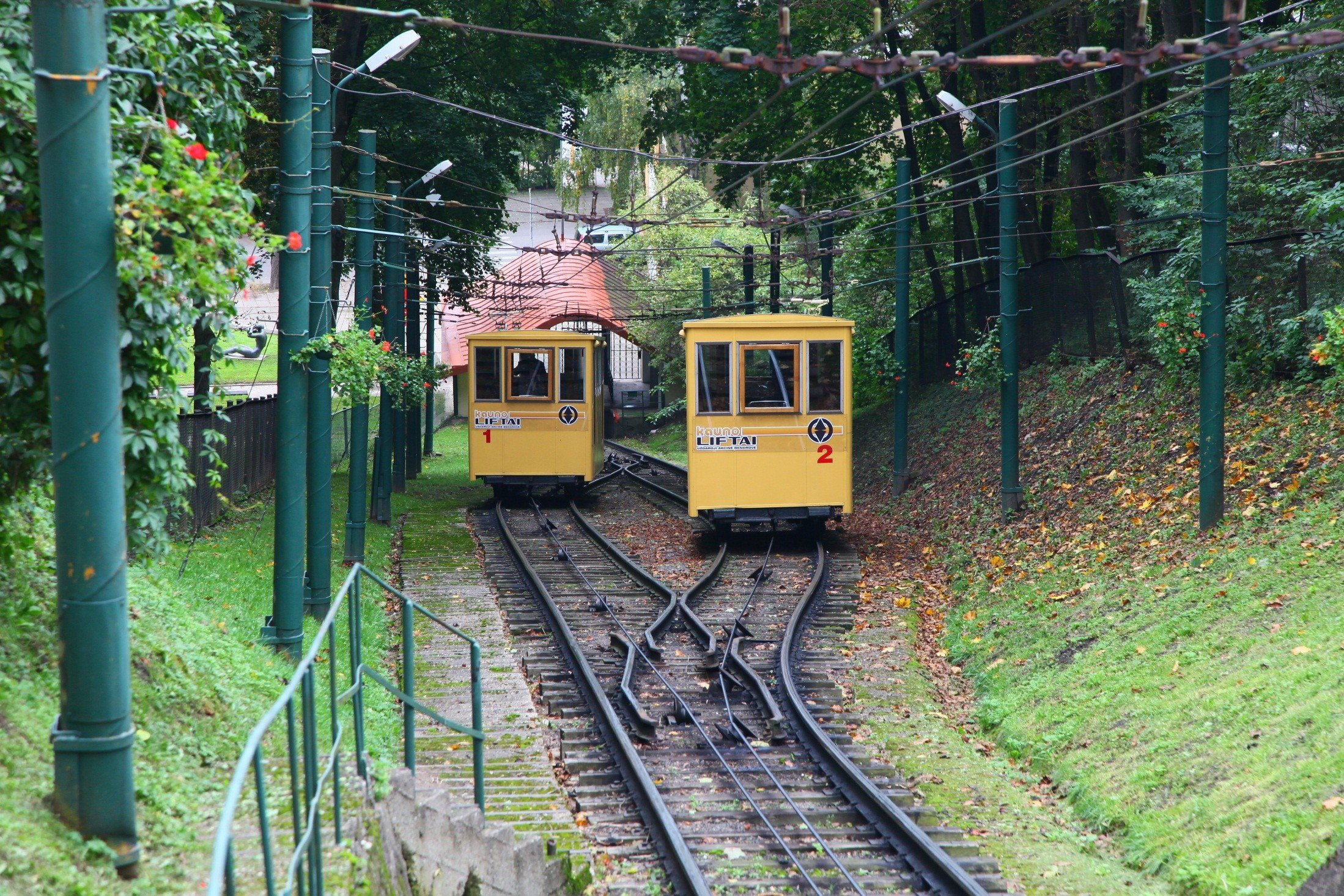
Žaliakalnis Funicular Railway

- Tomb of the Unknown Soldier, Eternal flame, and Statues of Lithuanian national renaissance figures are located in the Vienybės square in front of the War museum
- Kaunas Fortress, one of the largest defensive structures in Europe, occupying 65 km2 (25 sq mi), a 19th–20th century military fortress, which includes a Holocaust site of the Ninth Fort
- House of Perkūnas
- Interbellum functionalism architecture complexes
- Two funiculars – Žaliakalnis Funicular Railway and the Aleksotas Funicular Railway
- Lithuanian open-air Ethnographic Museum displaying the heritage of Lithuanian rural life in a vast collection of authentic resurrected buildings is situated east of Kaunas on the bank of Kaunas Reservoir in a town of Rumšiškės
- Kaunas Cultural Centre of Various Nations

=== Museums ===
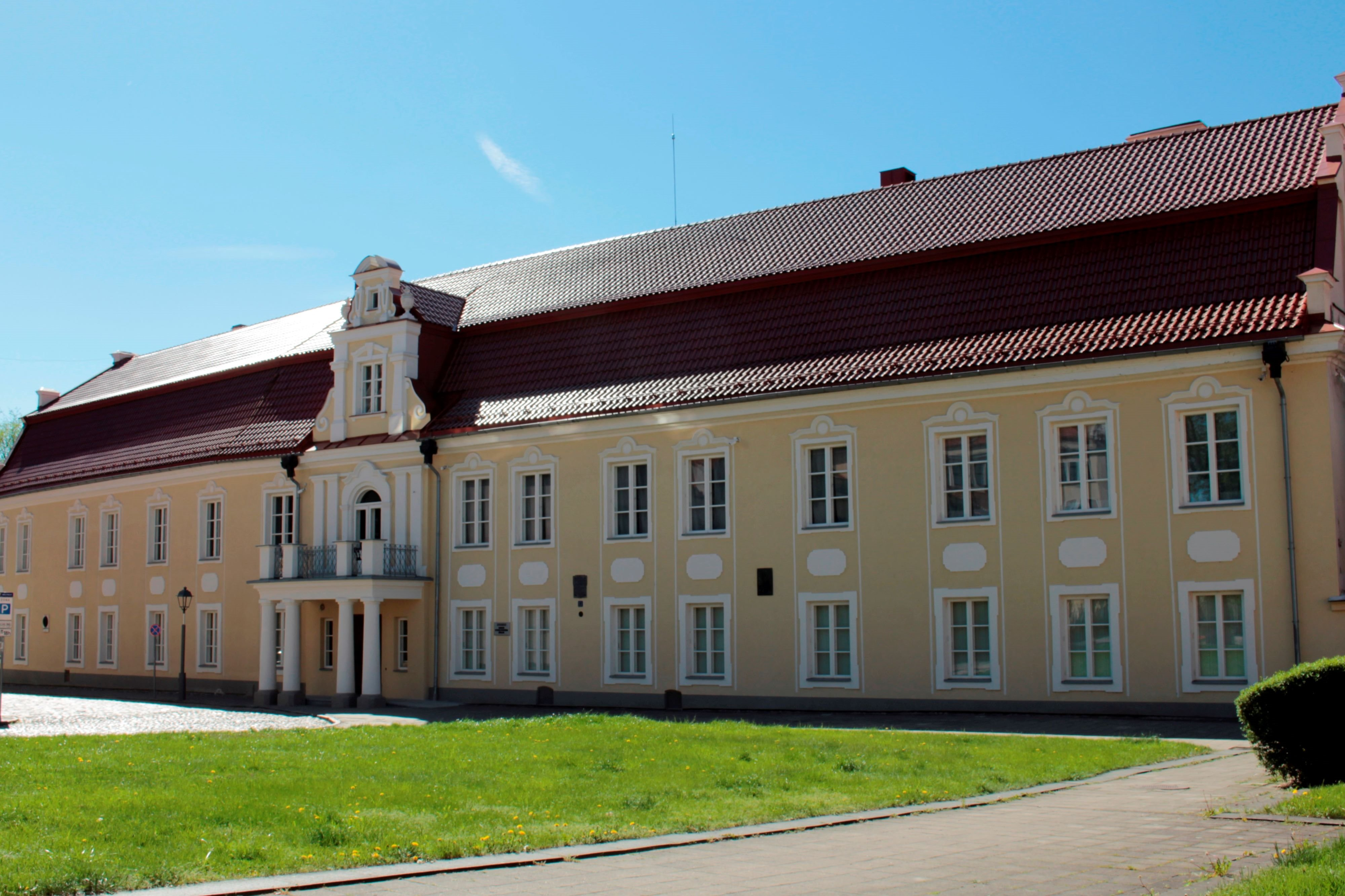
Maironis Lithuanian Literature Museum, located in the Siručiai Palace

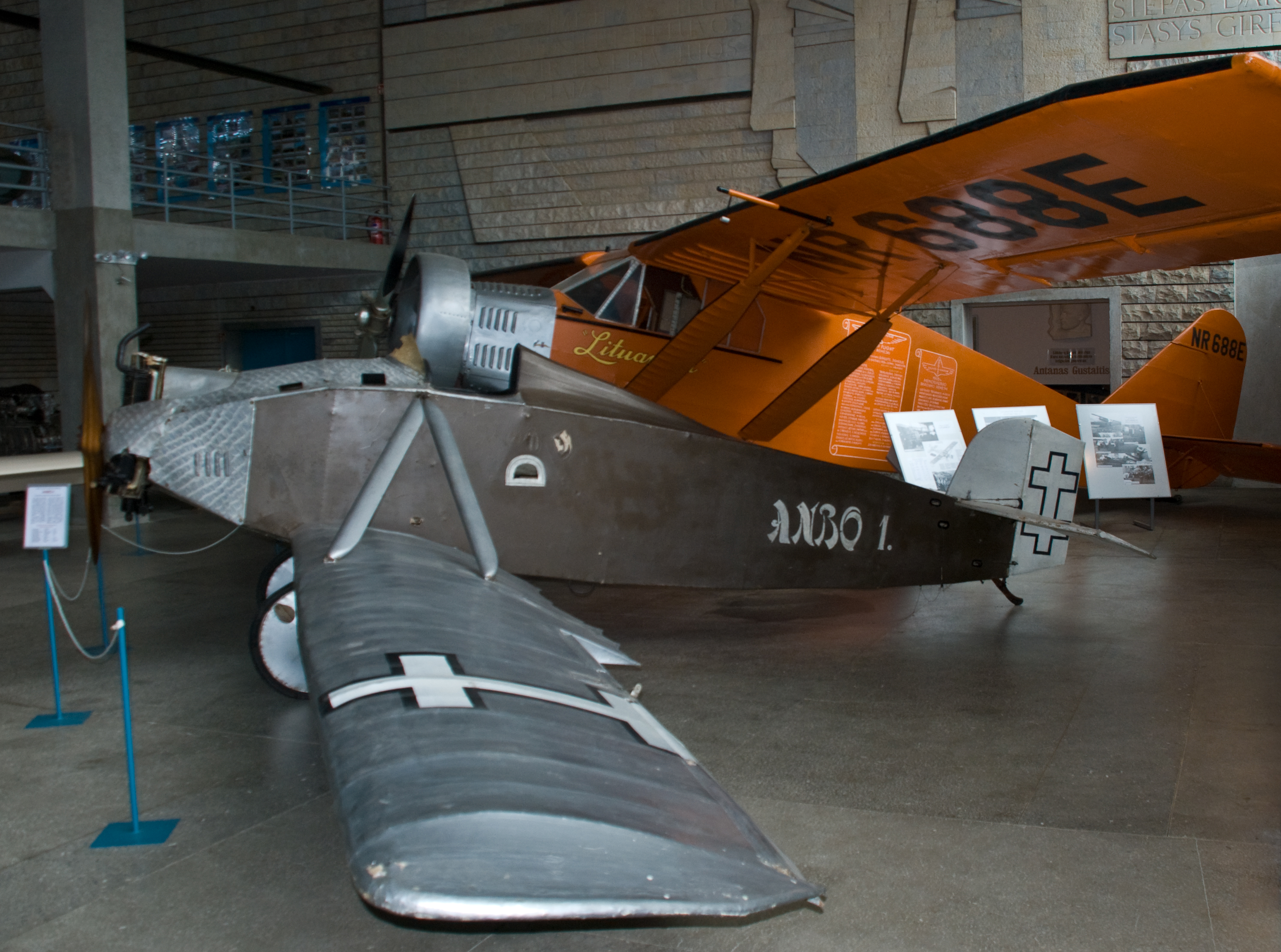
Lituanica's replica and ANBO I in the Lithuanian Aviation Museum

Kaunas is often called a city of museums, because of the abundance and variety of them. The museums in Kaunas include:

- the War Museum of Vytautas the Great
- the M. K. Čiurlionis National Art Museum, commemorating the work of the early 20th century avant-garde artist M. K. Čiurlionis who sought to combine painting and music into a single artistic medium
- the Žmuidzinavičius Museum (best known as the Devils' Museum), which houses a collection of more than two thousand sculptures and carvings of devils from all over the world, most of them of folk provenance. Of particular interest are the Adolf Hitler and Joseph Stalin devils, together doing the dance of death over a playground littered with human bones
- Lithuanian Aviation Museum
- Museum of the History of Lithuanian Medicine and Pharmacy
- Historical Presidential Palace, displaying exhibits from the interwar period
- Kaunas Museum for the Blind
- Maironis Lithuanian Literature Museum
- Kaunas Picture Gallery
- Mykolas Žilinskas Art Gallery
- Povilas Stulga Museum of Lithuanian Folk Instruments
- Tadas Ivanauskas Zoological Museum
- Sugihara house-museum
- The so-called ab underground printing house was a part of the nonviolent resistance press during the Soviet times. Now it is the branch of Kaunas War Museum, located 8 km (5 mi) north of Kaunas in a small Saliu village, near the town of Domeikava. Although the AB printing house worked regularly, it was never detected by KGB. It was included into the Registry of Immovable Cultural Heritage Sites of Lithuania in 1999.
- The apartments of some famous Kaunas natives, including Paulius Galaunė, Adam Mickiewicz, Juozas Grušas, Balys Sruoga, Juozas Tumas-Vaižgantas, Salomėja Nėris, Juozas Zikaras, Vincentas Sladkevičius have been turned into public museums.

=== Theatres ===
Kaunas State Philharmonic

Kaunas is notable for the diversity of its cultural life. Kaunas Symphony Orchestra is the main venue for classical music concerts. There is an old circus tradition in Kaunas. There was established static circus in the Vytautas park of Kaunas in the beginning of the 19th century. The only professional circus organisation in Lithuania, the Baltic Circus, was founded in Kaunas in 1995. Kaunas theatres play an important role in Lithuanian society. There are at least seven professional theatres, many amateur theatres, ensembles and abundant groups of art and sports. Some of the best examples of cultural life in Kaunas are theatres of various styles:

- Kaunas State Drama Theatre
- Kaunas State Musical Theatre
- Kaunas Pantomime Theatre
- Kaunas Chamber Theatre
- Kaunas Dance Theatre Aura
- Kaunas State Puppet Theatre

== Cityscape ==
=== Urbanism and architecture ===
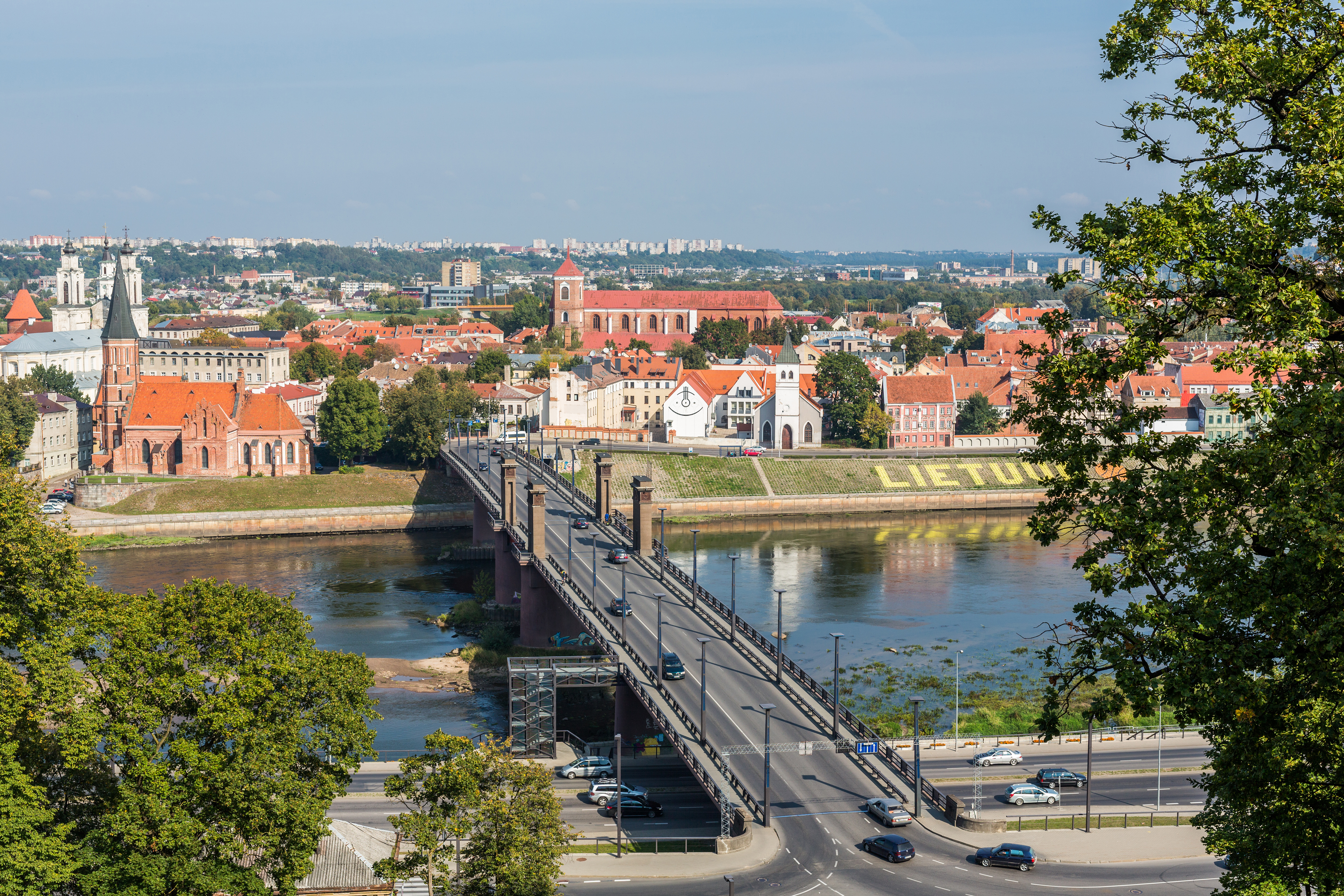
Panorama of the Kaunas Old Town as seen from Aleksotas Hill with Church of Vytautas the Great and Kaunas Archcathedral Basilica visible.

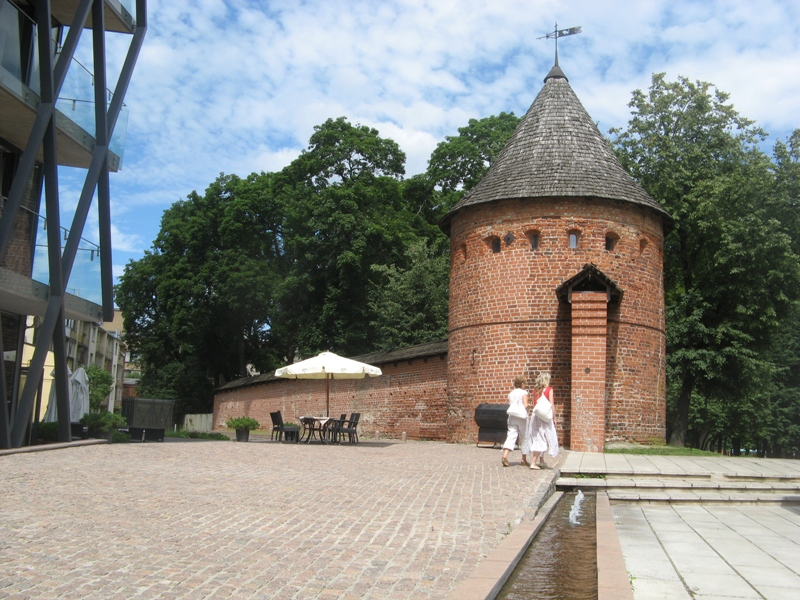
Authentic surviving fragment of the Kaunas Defensive Wall

The city plan is mixed. The rectangular old town at the confluence of the Nemunas and the Neris rivers is rich in valuable buildings and their complexes. During the Gothic period, the Kaunas Castle (13th–16th centuries), Old Kaunas Ducal Palace (15th century), Church of Vytautas the Great (beginning of the 15th century; also known as the Church of the Assumption of the Blessed Virgin Mary), Church of Saint Nicholas (late 15th century), St. George's Church and the Bernardine Monastery (1472), Church of St. Gertrude (15th–16th centuries; also has Renaissance elements), Kaunas Archcathedral Basilica (construction began in the 15th century; later was reconstructed and expanded), Kaunas Town Hall (construction began in 1542; later gained late Baroque and early Classicism forms), House of Perkūnas (late 15th century – early 16th century), residential houses in the Town Hall Square, Vilnius and Kurpių Streets were built. The ensemble of the Church of the Holy Trinity and the Bernardine monastery (started in the late 16th century), the so-called Napoleonic House (16th century) has Gothic, Renaissance, Baroque and Mannerist architecture features. The Renaissance remains of the Kaunas defensive fortifications have survived (second half of the 17th century).

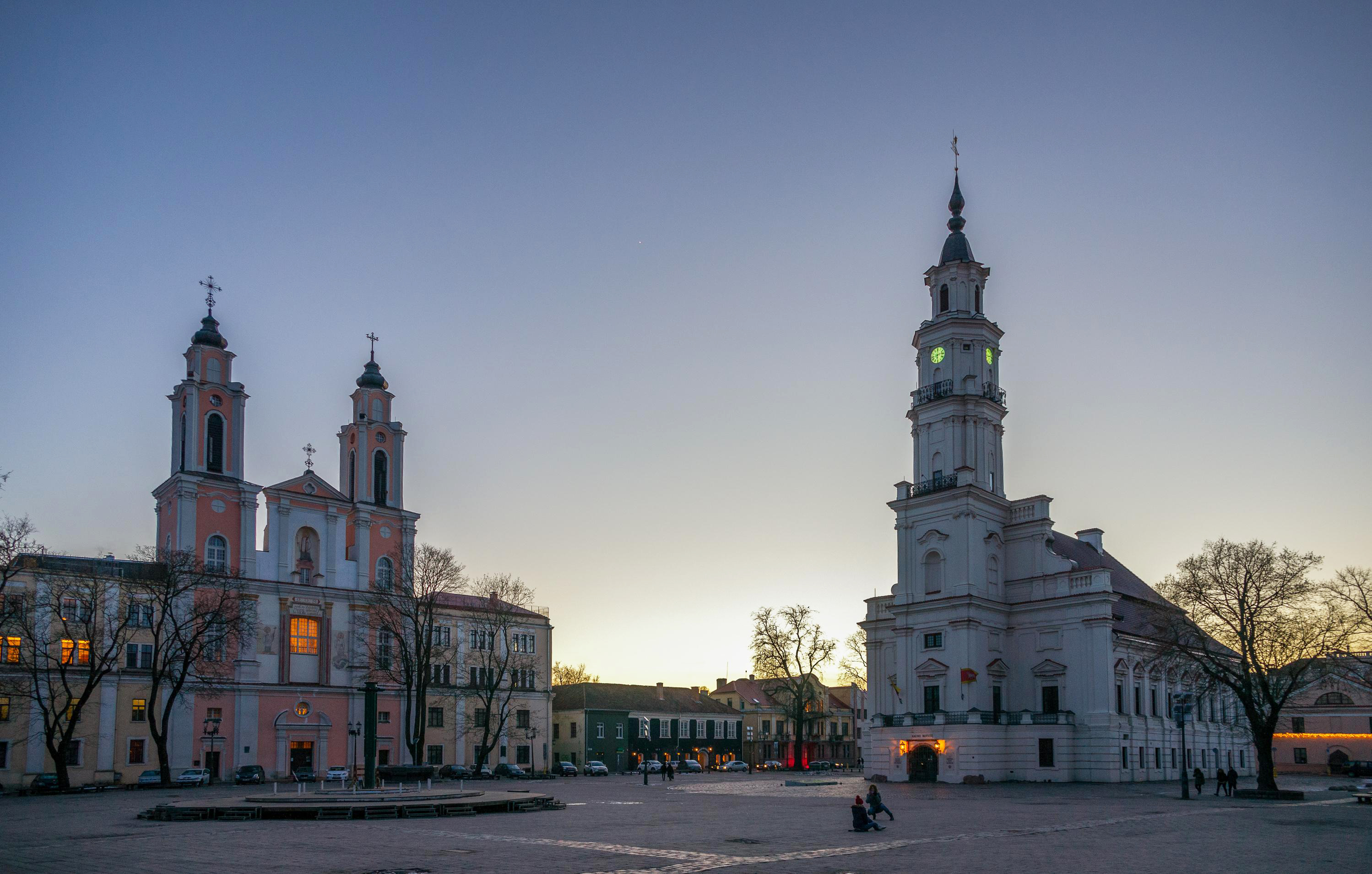
Church of St. Francis Xavier, built by the Jesuits in 1666–1732, and Kaunas Town Hall, dating to 1542

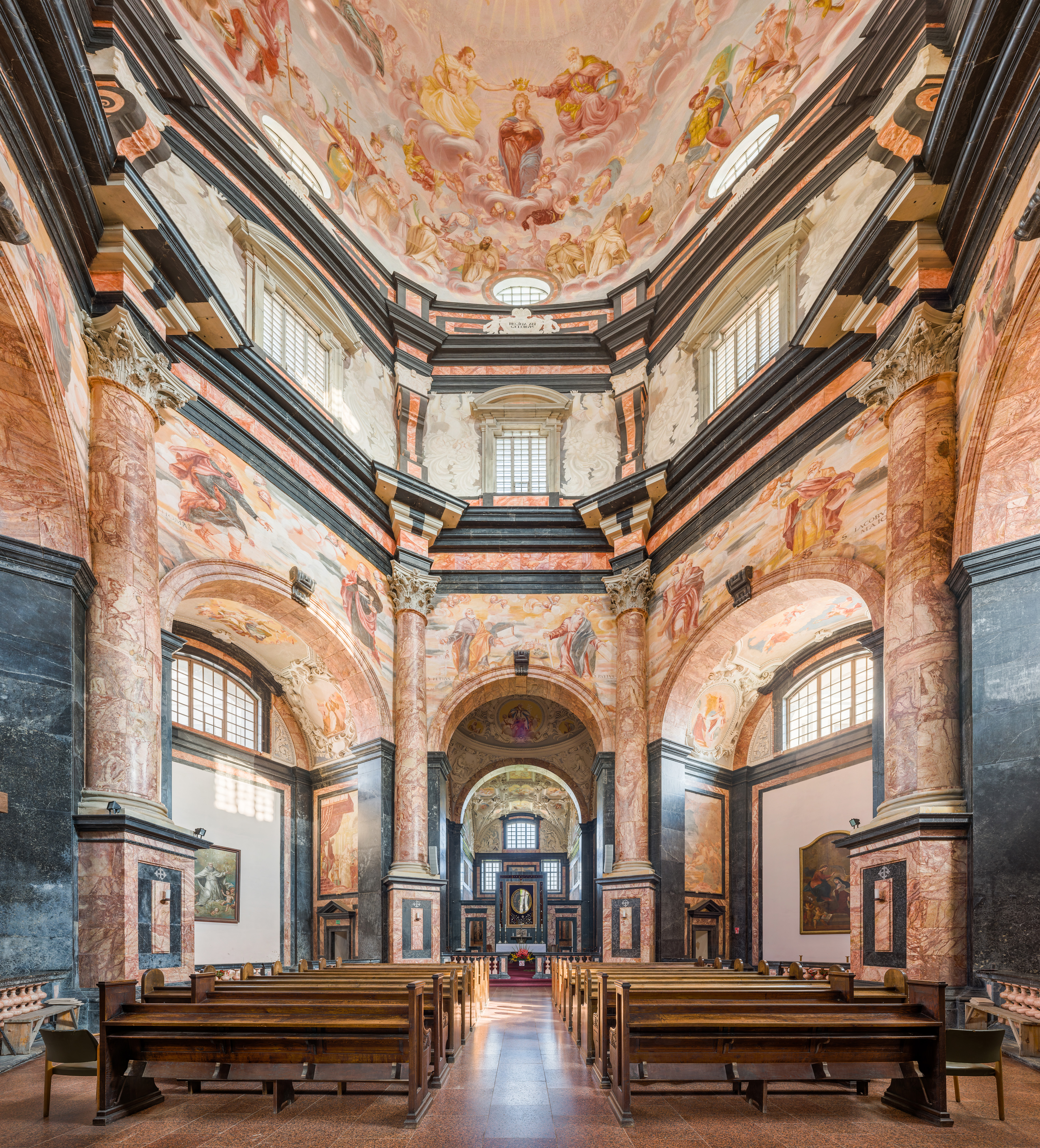
Pažaislis Monastery complex has the most marble-decorated Baroque church of the Grand Duchy of Lithuania

One of the most famous monuments of Baroque architecture is the ensemble of Pažaislis Church and Monastery (started in 1667, architects G. Frediani, C. Puttini, P. Puttini). Other Baroque-style buildings: Kaunas Lutheran Holly Trinity Church (1683; in 1862 Romanticism style bell tower was built, its architect was J. Woller), Corpus Christi Church (1690, in 1866 was reconstructed to an Orthodox church gained Byzantine forms), Church of St. Francis Xavier (1720; towers were built in 1725); Baroque and Classicism elements: the ensemble of the Church of the Holy Cross (1690) and the Carmelite Monastery (1777), Siručiai Palace (18th century; also known as Maironis House, from 1936 is used as the Maironis Lithuanian Literature Museum).

Forms of classicist architecture are typical in the Aukštoji Freda Manor (early 19th century), post station building complex (early 19th century; architect J. Poussier). Notable buildings of the Historicism period in Kaunas are: Kaunas State Musical Theatre (1892; architect J. Golinevičius; was expanded in the 20th century), St. Michael the Archangel Church (Neo-Byzantine style; architect K. Limarenko), brick-style Saulės Gymnasium building (1913; engineer F. Malinovskis, later E. A. Frykas), Kaunas Fortress (1889).

Kaunas Central Post Office is one of the most recognizable buildings of interwar Lithuania

Vytautas the Great War Museum with tower of the Kaunas Carillon

Romuva Cinema, the oldest still operational movie theater in Lithuania, which was initially opened in 1940

In the first half of the 20th century, when Kaunas became the temporary capital of Lithuania in 1919, the city was extensively modernized and thousands of new buildings were built. From 1918 to 1940 more than 12.000 construction permits were issued in Kaunas, which was an extremely rapid growth for a relatively small-scale city (90.000 inhabitants) that fundamentally changed the city's character. The construction permits resulted in more than 10.000 buildings being built in the city and the area of Kaunas expanded 7,1 times during the interwar period. Neoclassicism prevailed in the 3rd decade of the 20th century (Kaunas School of Arts, built in 1923, Bank of Lithuania building, built in 1928, Palace of Justice and the Parliament with Art Deco elements, built in 1930) and a search for the Lithuanian national style was typical (e.g. residential house of Ragutis factory, built in 1925). The styles of Classicism and Modernism intertwined in buildings built in the beginning of the 1930s (e.g. Faculty of Medicine at Vytautas Magnus University, built in 1933, now belongs to the Lithuanian University of Health Sciences, Vytautas the Great War Museum and M. K. Čiurlionis National Art Museum, built in 1936), while Modernism and national style intertwined in the Kaunas Central Post Office (architect F. Vizbaras), built in 1932, Kaunas Garrison Officers' Club Building (architect S. Kudokas and others), built in 1937.

The most notable Rationalism style buildings in Kaunas are: Christ's Resurrection Church (construction began in 1933, but it was converted into a radio factory from 1952 and so it was returned to the believers only in 1990 and was reconstructed in 2005), palaces of Pienocentras (architects Vytautas Landsbergis-Žemkalnis, K. Reisonas), Pažangos with Art Deco decoration elements (architect F. Vizbaras), Physical Culture (architect V. Landsbergis‑Žemkalnis, now belongs to the Lithuanian Sports University), Prekybos, pramonės ir amatų (1938, architect V. Landsbergis‑Žemkalnis), Taupomųjų kasų (1939; architects A. Funkas, B. Elsbergas, A. Lukošaitis; now is the primary building of Kaunas City Municipality); Church of the Most Sacred Heart of Jesus (1938; architect A. Šalkauskis), Military Research Laboratory for the Lithuanian Ministry of National Defense (1938; architect V. Landsbergis‑Žemkalnis; now Faculty of Chemical Technology at Kaunas University of Technology), Kaunas Clinics complex (1939; French architect U. Cassan), Kaunas Sports Hall (1939; engineer A. Rozenbliumas), Pasaka Cinema (1939), Romuva Cinema (1940), residential houses complex in V. Putvinskio Street (formed in 1928–1937). In 2023, the UNESCO World Heritage Centre included the Kaunas modernist architecture into the List of World Heritage Sites.

After World War II buildings of pseudoclassical forms were built (e.g. Kaunas railway station, built in 1953), complex engineering structures (Kaunas Hydroelectric Power Plant, built in 1960). From the 7th decade of the 20th century Modernism style buildings were further developed. New residential areas were built (e.g. Kalniečiai, completed in 1985), public buildings (e.g. Industrial Construction Design Institute, 1966, House for Political Education (now part of Vytautas Magnus University), 1976), shopping malls (e.g. Girstupis, 1975, Vitebskas, 1980, Kalniečių, 1986), shops (Viešnagė, 1982, Merkurijus, 1983), galleries (e.g. Kaunas Picture Gallery, 1978, Mykolas Žilinskas Art Gallery, 1989), educational institutions (e.g. Faculty of Light Industry at Kaunas University of Technology, 1983).

Business centre decorated with a 1000 Lithuanian litas banknote design

In the late 20th century and early 21st century, buildings were built in Kaunas based on the projects of architects V. Adomavičius (e.g. Ąžuolynas Sports Center Complex, 2003), G. Jurevičius (e.g. Peugeot, Toyota, Lexus, Honda car showrooms), A. Kančas (e.g. Aleksotas Church of St. Casimir, 1997, company Kraft Foods Lietuva administrative and laboratory buildings complex, 2001, shopping and entertainment center Akropolis, 2007), A. Karalius (building materials salon Iris, 2002, block of flats Aušros namai, 2005), D. Paulauskienė (e.g. Catherine's Monastery, 2000) E. Miliūnas (e.g. Žalgiris Arena, 2001), G. Janulytė‑Bernotienė (e.g. Library and Health Sciences Information Center of Lithuanian University of Health Sciences, 2007, Center for Science Studies and Business of Kaunas University of Technology Santakos Valley, 2013), G. Balčytis (e.g. Kaunas Bus Station reconstruction, 2017), G. Natkevičius (e.g. Moxy Kaunas Center Hotel), A. Kaušpėdas, V. Klimavičius, D. Laurinaitienė.

== Education ==
=== Primary and secondary education ===
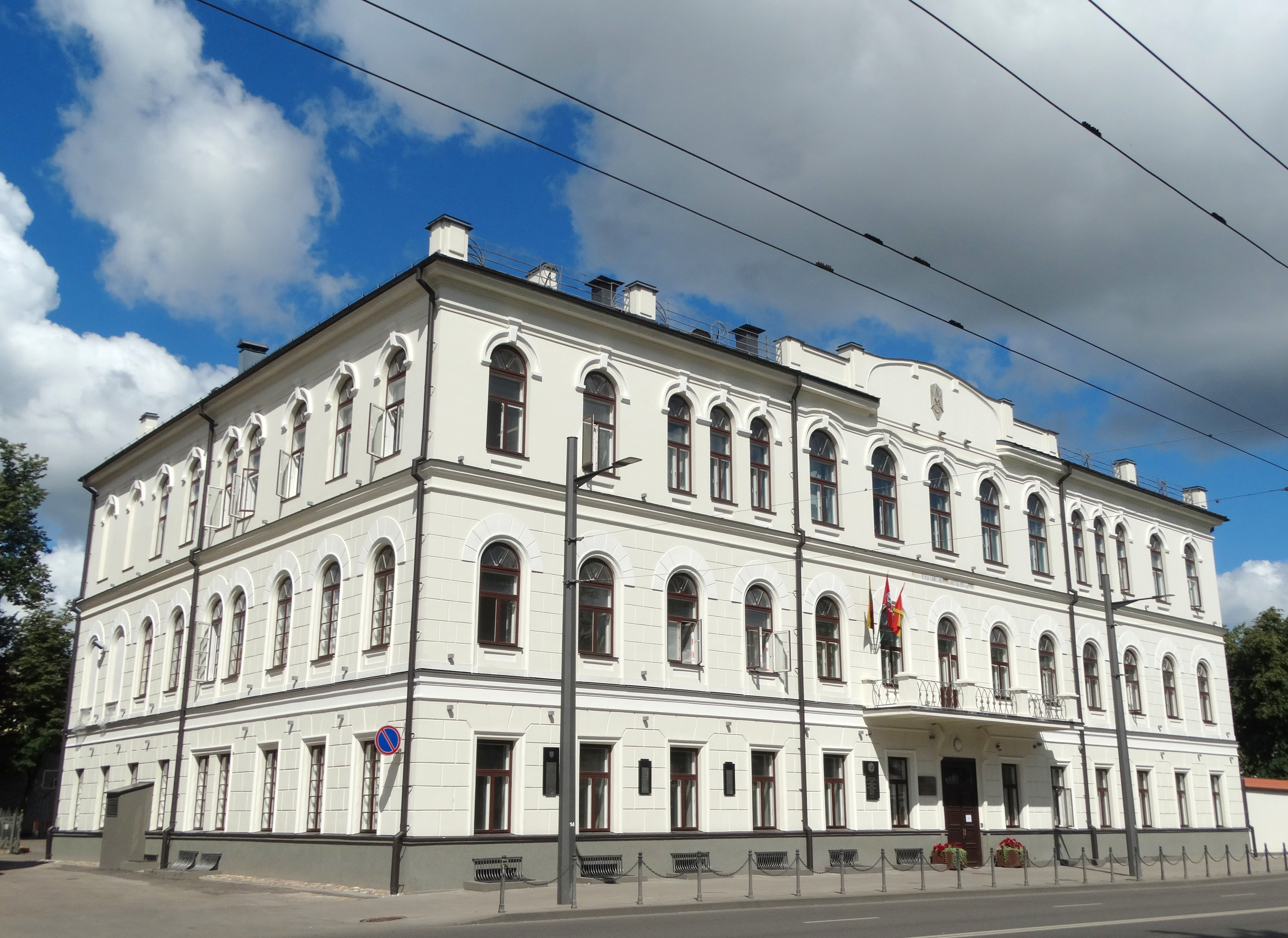
Kaunas Maironis University Gymnasium, the oldest operational school in Kaunas, which was moved to this then newly built building in 1863

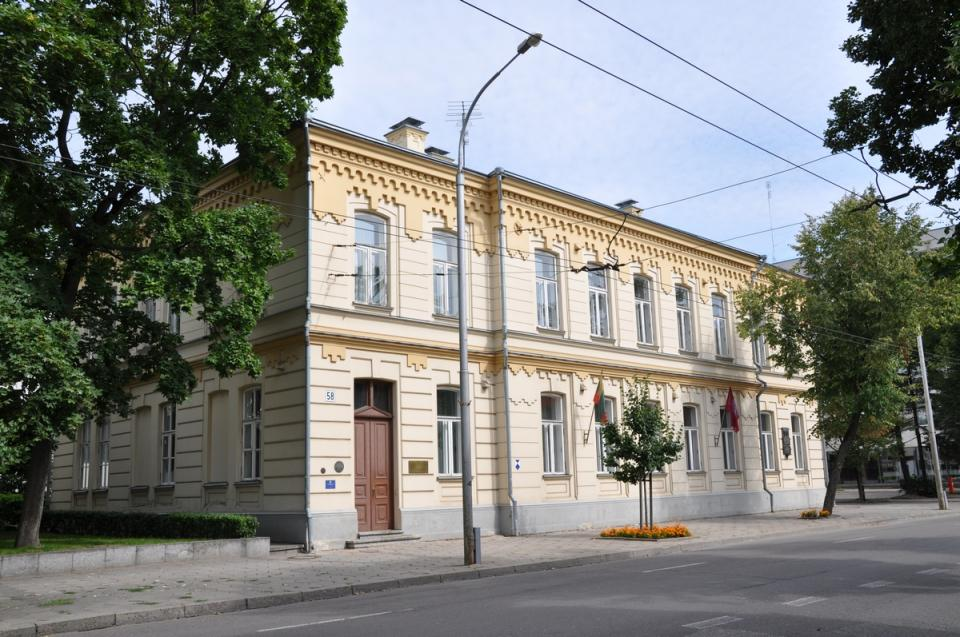
Building where since 1919 the Ministry of Education of Lithuania operated, later since 1921 the entire Cabinet of Ministers until 1940

At the time of paganism Lithuanian children were educated at home schools near manors, however following the Christianization of Lithuania in 1387 schools began to be established near churches and the first parochial school in Kaunas was established in 1473. The ability to write was essential for Kaunas's merchants, craftsmen and employees of the offices of city self-government institutions work.

In 1648, Kaunas Jesuit College (Latin: Collegium Caunense) was established and until 1702 its status as collegium inchoatum settled down, which meant a high school with a shortened philosophy course. Therefore, in the 16th–18th centuries Kaunas had education with levels from primary to secondary school and the studies met demands not only of Kaunas but also of the surrounding area.

On 14 October 1773, the Commission of National Education was created by the Sejm of the Polish–Lithuanian Commonwealth and the Grand Duke Stanisław August Poniatowski, which supervised universities, schools and was responsible for other educational matters in the Commonwealth. Because of its vast authority and autonomy, it is considered as the first Ministry of Education in European history and an important achievement of the Enlightenment in the Commonwealth. At the time the education province of Lithuania was assigned to be managed by Vilnius University.

Following the Third Partition of the Commonwealth, Kaunas and Lithuania proper became a part of the Russian Empire. In 1843, the Gymnasium of the Kražiai College, one of the most important centers of education and Jesuit science in Lithuania, was transferred from Kražiai to Kaunas, and currently it is named Kaunas Maironis University Gymnasium. In 1848, Kaunas became capital of the Kovno Governorate which had 197 Lithuanian primary schools, however the education was greatly affected by the Lithuanian press ban (1865–1904) and Russification policies, especially after the 1863 January Uprising. Nevertheless, Kovno Governorate was one of the leading governorates by population literacy – 55,3%, compared to the average of 19% of population (9 years or older) of the Russian Empire in 1897.

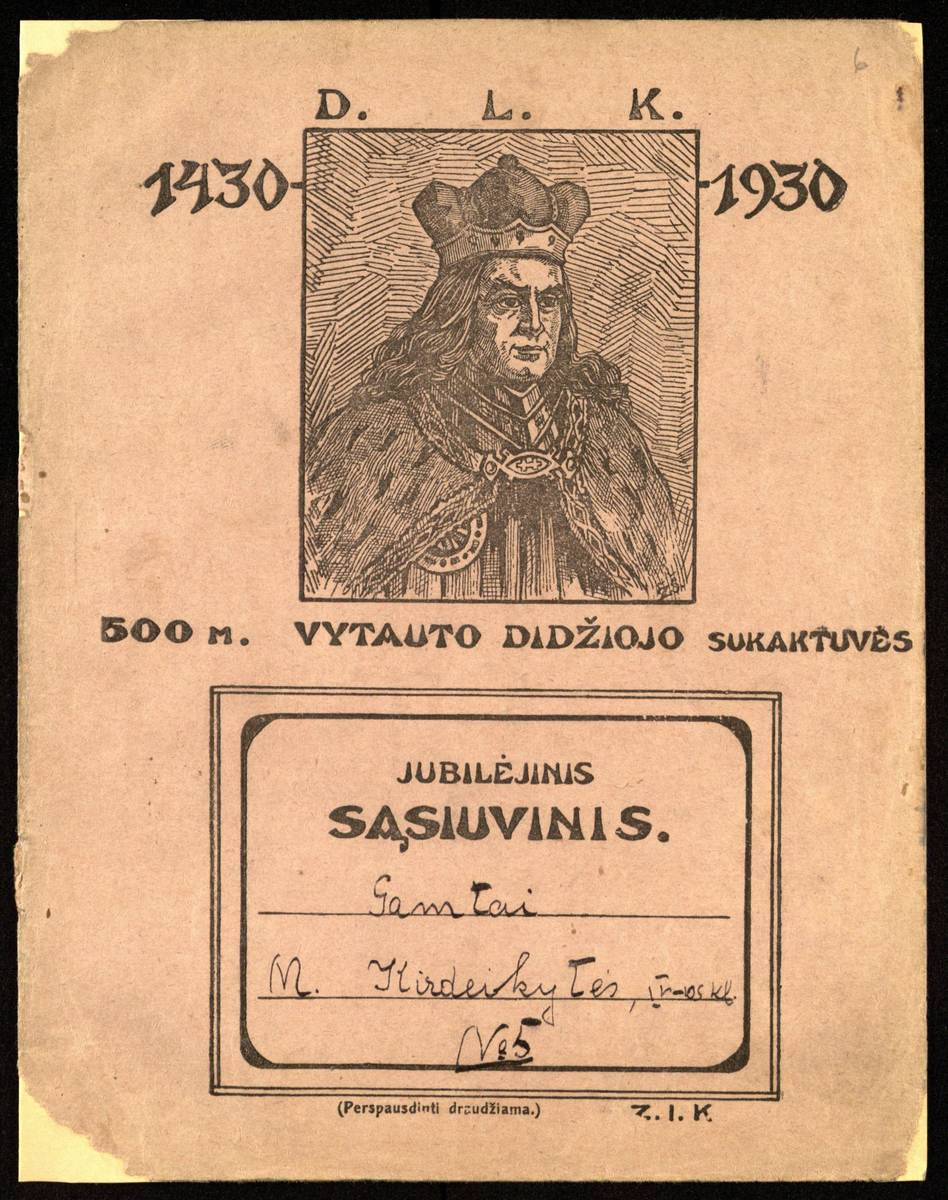
School notebook cover with Vytautas the Great, an example of patriotic education in interwar-period Lithuania

Following the adoption of the Act of Independence of Lithuania in 1918, the Government of Lithuania was soon forced to retreat from Vilnius to Kaunas in January 1919, and from 1919 the Ministry of Education of Lithuania operated in Kaunas. This resulted in an influx into Kaunas of Lithuanian intellectuals (e.g. Jonas Jablonskis, Juozas Tumas-Vaižgantas) and teachers who began educational activities. During the interwar period the Lithuanian educational system was transformed based on Western countries examples and the Constituent Assembly of Lithuania adopted the Primary Schools Act which required 7-11-year-old children to attend free primary education for four years (the primary education was prolonged to six years in 1936) and many new schools for various ages pupils were established. Moreover, children were taught patriotism from an early age, later children joined Ateitis and Lietuvos Skautija organizations, while school notebooks covers for pupils were printed with famous Lithuanian personalities portraits (e.g. Vytautas, Birutė, Jonas Basanavičius, etc.). In 1922, the Kaunas Art School was established in Kaunas and it was the only public art school in interwar Lithuania. In 1931, Jonas Laužikas established a special education school in Kaunas which was the first such type school in Lithuania and it still operates. The overall improvement of education system during the interwar period resulted in 92% of literacy rate of the population in Lithuania in 1939 (mostly only part of the older age inhabitants were still illiterate).

In January 1919, the War School of Kaunas was established as a military school for junior officers, while since 1921 the senior officers studied at the Higher Officers' Courses which in 1932 became the Higher Military School when a department of the General Staff was established, however both institutions were dissolved in 1940.

The Soviet occupation of Lithuania in 1940 and in 1944 resulted in the Sovietization of Lithuanian education system which also affected education in Kaunas until 1990, while many students, teachers, and lecturers departed to the Western Europe or faced Soviet deportations.

Following the Re-Establishment of the State of Lithuania in 1990, the Lithuanian education system was once again significantly reformed. Currently, Kaunas has a network of state-funded schools: 6 primary schools, 17 progymnasiums, 20 gymnasiums, and 43 private pre-school and general education institutions. The Kaunas University of Technology Gymnasium is one of the best ranked gymnasiums in Lithuania (2nd in 2024). Most of pupils in Kaunas later studies in the universities or colleges as Lithuania is one of the world's leading countries in OECD's statistics of population with tertiary education (58.15% of 25–34-year-olds in 2022).

=== Tertiary education ===
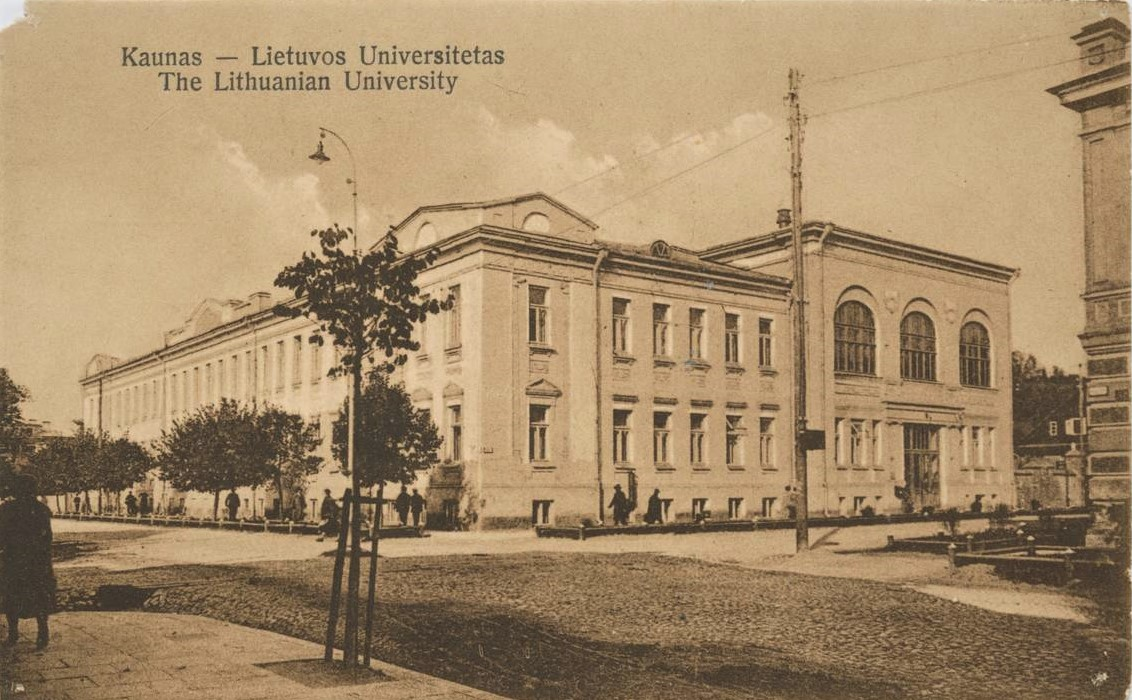
The University of Lithuania in 1925, a university which legacy is shared by three universities in Kaunas, while its former First Palace (pictured) is currently the Aula of the Kaunas University of Technology.

Vytautas Magnus University Great Hall in the Student's Square

Aerial view of the Kaunas University of Technology Campus

Hospital of Lithuanian University of Health Sciences Kaunas Clinics

Until the 20th century Kaunas had no tertiary education institutions as the Vilnius University (est. 1579) for centuries was the only university in the Grand Duchy of Lithuania, but it was closed in 1832 by the tsarist authorities and the Council of Lithuania desired to revive it in the 20th century. However, during the conflict for the Vilnius Region the Lithuanians were unable to maintain control in the since 1918 declared capital Vilnius with the remnants of the Vilnius University which was firstly captured by the Bolsheviks in January 1919, then by the Polish forces in November 1920 and was eventually annexed by Poland in 1922 which left a newly restored Lithuania without any tertiary education institutions, therefore Lithuanian intellectuals sought to promptly establish it.

Already in the fall of 1919 a memorandum of Lithuanian cultural workers to establish a tertiary education institution in Kaunas was handed to the Government of Lithuania, however it was rejected due to difficult political and financial situation. Nevertheless, on 27 January 1920 the Lithuanian intellectuals who initiated the memorandum decided to establish (without the permission and financial support of the Government) the Higher Courses with six divisions which was the first higher education institution of a restored Lithuania. On 16 February 1922, the Higher Courses were reorganized to the University of Lithuania and in March an autonomy was granted, while in 1930 it was renamed after Vytautas the Great commemorating his 500th death anniversary. The status of the university diminished during the Soviet and Nazi periods and on 31 October 1950 it was even reorganized to two institutes. In 1988, the issue of re-establishment of the university was raised, while in March 1989 the Re-establishment Council was elected and in April 1989 re-established Vytautas Magnus University. Currently, VMU is among three percent of the best ranked universities worldwide per QS World University Rankings (741–750) and is the second largest Lithuanian university according to the number of enrolments.

The Kaunas University of Technology also traces its origins to the interwar VMU as a part of it was reorganized in 1950 by the Soviets to the Kaunas Polytechnic Institute, however in 1990 its university status was restored. Currently, the KTU is ranked 751-760 worldwide per QS World University Rankings and has over 1,000 academicians along with over 7,000 students. Moreover, KTU is a member of the European Consortium of Innovative Universities.

The Lithuanian University of Health Sciences is yet another university which traces its origins to the interwar VMU as a part of it was reorganized in 1950 by the Soviets to the Kaunas Medical Institute, but in 1998 its university status was restored as the Kaunas Medical University which in 2010 was merged with the Lithuanian Veterinary Academy to form a single university and currently is the largest Lithuanian university in the field of biomedical sciences.

The Lithuanian Sports University (est. in 1934, granted university status in 2012) is a unique tertiary education institution in Lithuania which specializes in the training of physical education, sports and wellness specialists of which it has already prepared 15,000.

Some Lithuanian tertiary education institutions has its divisions in Kaunas: Vilnius University Kaunas Faculty, Mykolas Romeris University Faculty of Public Security, Vilnius Academy of Art Kaunas Faculty of Art.

Non-university tertiary education in Kaunas is provided by Kaunas College, Kaunas Technical College, Kolpingo College, Kaunas College of Forestry and Environmental Engineering, SMK College of Applied Sciences, St. Ignatius of Loyola College, V. A. Graičiūnas School of Management, Vilnius Cooperative College Kaunas Branch.

The Santaka Valley is an integrated Science, Studies and Business Centre (Valley) which is one of the largest and most modern in Baltic states.

The network of tertiary education institutions which attracts a high number of students (e.g. 40,000 in 2023) resulted in Kaunas being nicknamed the "student city" for decades and in 2024 Kaunas was included in the worldwide list of the QS Best Student Cities Rankings 2025.

=== Libraries ===
Kaunas has numerous libraries. The most important is the Kaunas County Public Library. It was established as the Central Library of Lithuania in 1919. A part of its collection was transferred to Martynas Mažvydas National Library of Lithuania in 1963. Now the Kaunas County Public Library holds more than 2.2 million volumes in its collection and functions as a depository library of the International Bank for Reconstruction and Development.

== Parks, leisure, and cemeteries ==
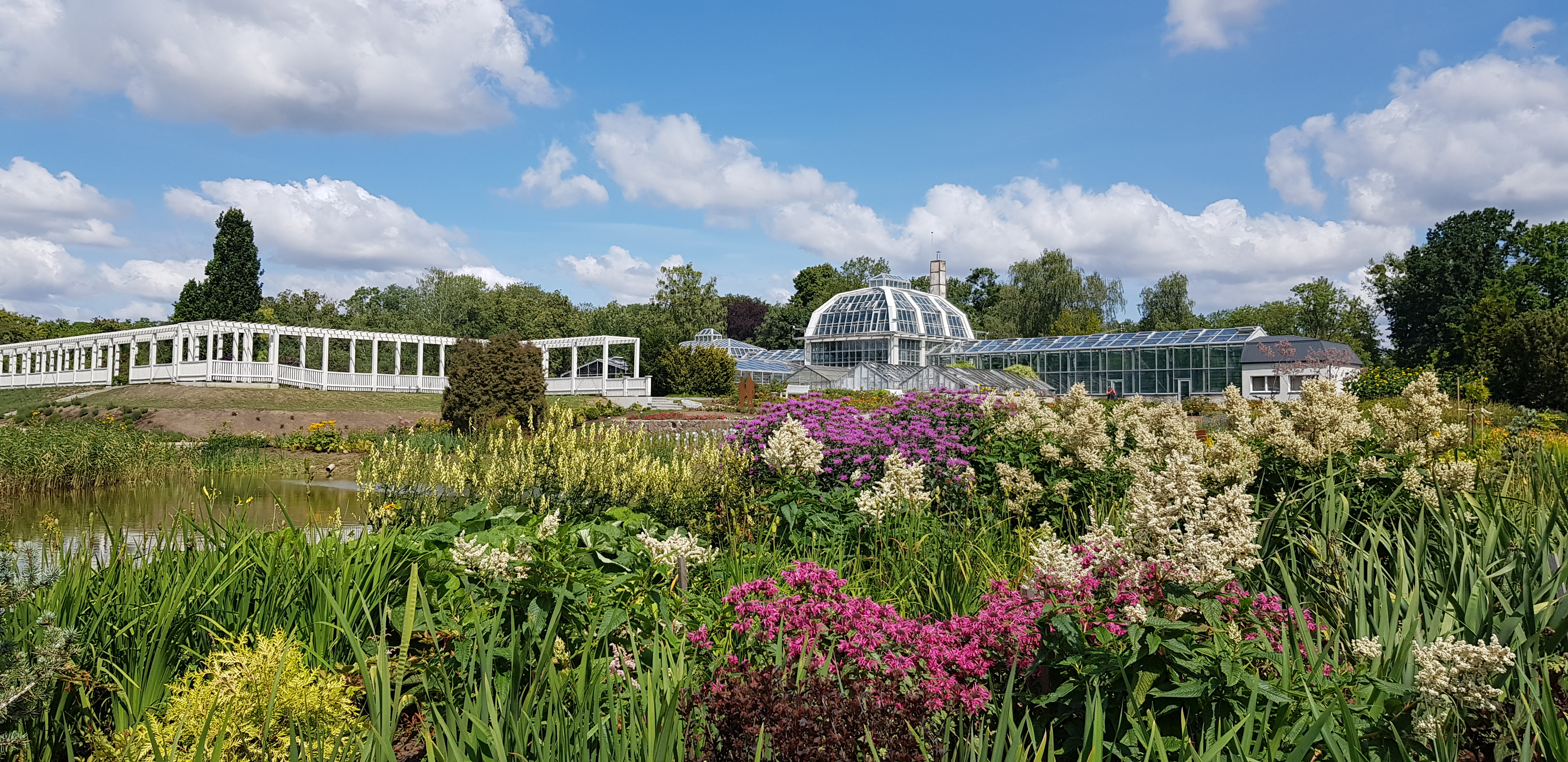
Vytautas Magnus University Botanical Garden

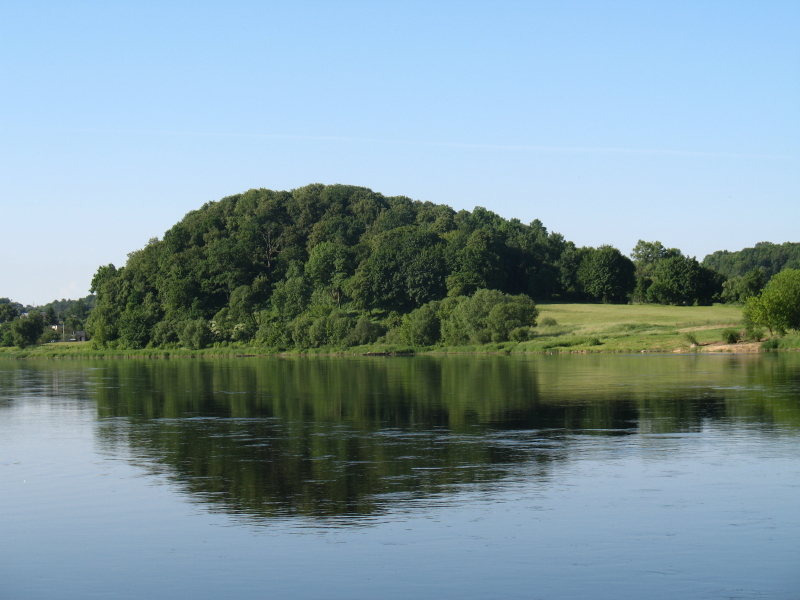
Napoleon's Hill

The city of Kaunas has a number of parks and public open spaces. It devotes 7.3% of its total land acreage to parkland. Ąžuolynas (literally, "Oak Grove") park is a main public park in the heart of Kaunas. It covers about 63 hectares and is the largest urban stand of mature oaks in Europe. To protect the unique lower landscape of Kaunas Reservoir, its natural ecosystem, and cultural heritage Kaunas Reservoir Regional Park was established in the eastern edge of Kaunas in 1992.

By the initiative of a prominent Lithuanian zoologist Tadas Ivanauskas and biologist Constantin von Regel the Botanical Garden was founded in 1923. It serves not only as a recreational area for public, but also serves as a showcase for local plant life, and houses various research facilities. In addition, Kaunas is home to Kaunas Zoo, the only state-operated zoo in all of Lithuania.

Lithuania's premiere last resting place formally designated for graves of people influential in national history, politics, and arts is Petrašiūnai Cemetery in Kaunas. It is also the burial site of some signatories of the 1918 Act of Independence. There are four old Jewish cemeteries within city limits. Furthermore, since 1959 there is the Ramybė Park which is a public park located in the territory of the Kaunas City Old Cemetery, which was established in 1847.

On 23 September 2018, Pope Francis visited Santakos Park in Kaunas as part of a tour of the Baltic states.

== Economy ==
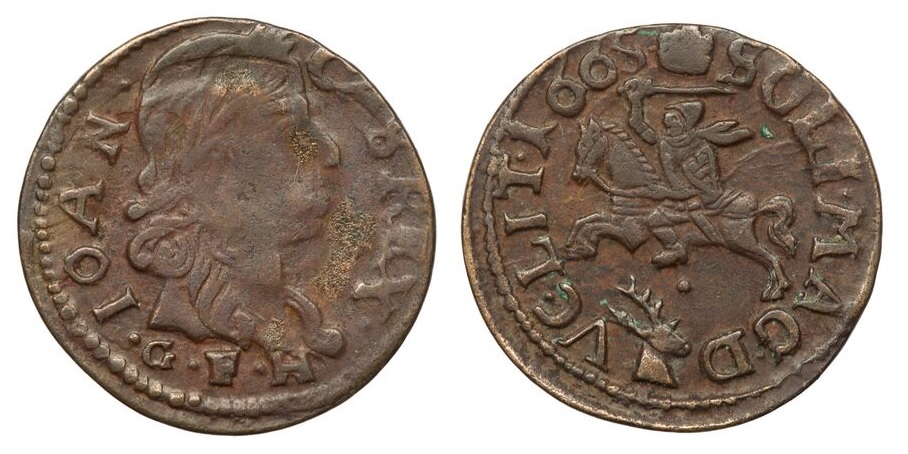
Coin of the Grand Duchy of Lithuania, minted at the Kaunas Mint, 1665

The Bank of Lithuania Palace in Kaunas was built in 1924–1928 with sumptuous interior and splendid exterior in order to showcase the economic capability of a newly restored Lithuania

The Kaunas Mint produced coins of the Grand Duchy of Lithuania from 17 October 1665 to 15 January 1667 during the reign of Grand Duke John II Casimir Vasa. During the interwar period, the Kaunas Mint was reestablished in 1936 and produced coins of the Republic of Lithuania.

Kaunas is a large center of industry, trade, and services in Lithuania. The most developed industries in Kaunas are amongst the food and beverage industries, textile and light industries, chemical industry, publishing and processing, pharmaceuticals, metal industry, wood processing and furniture industry. Recently information technology and electronics have become part of the business activities taking place in Kaunas. In addition, the city also has large construction industry which includes, but is not limited to commercial, housing and road construction.

Primary foreign investors in Kaunas are companies from the Sweden, United States, Finland, Estonia, Denmark, and Russia. Head offices of several major International and Lithuanian companies are located in Kaunas, including largest Generic Pharmaceuticals producer in Lithuania "Sanitas", producer of sportswear AB "Audimas", one of the largest construction companies "YIT Kausta", JSC "Senukai", largest producer in Lithuania of strong alcoholic drinks JSC "Stumbras", Finnish capital brewery JSC "Ragutis", JSC "Fazer Gardesis", JSC "Stora Enso Packaging", producer of pharmaceuticals, and the only producer of homoeopathic medicines in Lithuania JSC "Aconitum". Its geographic location causes Kaunas to be considered one of the largest logistics centres in Lithuania. The largest wholesale, distribution and logistics company in Lithuania and Latvia JSC "Sanitex", as well as a subsidiary of material handling and logistics company Dematic in the Baltics have been operated in Kaunas. Currently, Kaunas Public Logistics Centre is being built by the demand of national state-owned railway company Lithuanian Railways. The "Margasmiltė" company currently has been working on a project that concerns exploitation of Pagiriai anhydrite deposit. The project includes mining of anhydrite, a mine with underground warehouses, building the overground transport terminal, as well as an administrative building. The Pagiriai anhydrite deposit is located 10.5 km (6.5 mi) south from the downtown of Kaunas, at a 2.2 km (1.4 mi) distance to the southwest from the Garliava town. The resources of thoroughly explored anhydrite in the Pagiriai deposit amount to 81.5 million tons.

The Lithuanian Central Credit Union—national cooperative federation for credit unions established in 2001, is located in Kaunas. At present the Lithuanian Central Credit Union has 61 members.

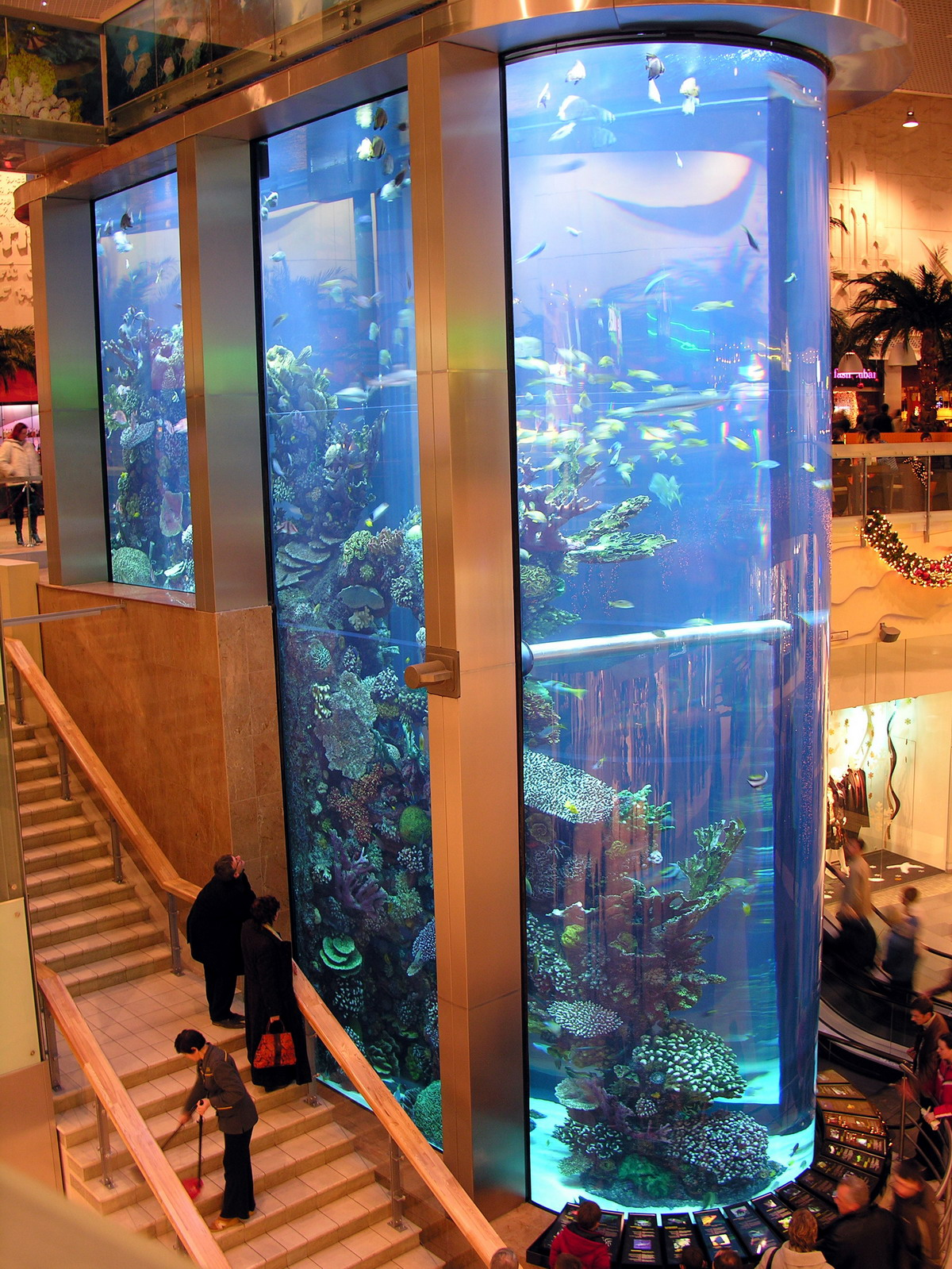
Aquarium in the PLC Mega shopping center

There are also some innovative companies located in Kaunas, such as leading wholesaler of computer components, data storage media "ACME group", internet and TV provider, communications JSC "Mikrovisata group", developer and producer original products for TV and embedded technologies JSC "Selteka". Joint Lithuanian-German company "Net Frequency", based in Kaunas, is a multimedia and technology service provider. Kaunas is also home to R&D department of Dassault Systèmes producing world-leading modeling tools software CATIA. A LED lighting assembly plant was opened in Kaunas by South Korean company LK Technology in February 2011. JSC "Baltic car equipment" is one of the leaders in Baltic countries, in the field of manufacturing electronic equipment for automobiles. It also specialises in development of new telemetry, data base creation, mobile payment projects. Kaunas Free Economic Zone established in 1996 has also attracted some investors from abroad, including the development of the new 200 MW Cogeneration Power Plant project, proposed by the Finnish capital company Fortum Heat Lithuania. Before its disestablishment, Air Lithuania had its head office in Kaunas. Kaunas Hydroelectric Power Plant is the largest one in Lithuania.

Some notable changes are under construction and in the stage of disputes. The construction of a new landmark of Kaunas—the Žalgiris Arena—began in the autumn of 2008. It was completed in August 2011. Currently discussions are underway about the further development of the Vilijampolė district on the right bank of the Neris River and the Nemunas River, near their confluence.

In October 2017, an automotive parts and technologies manufacturer Continental AG decided to invest over 95 million euros to build a new factory in Kaunas, which is the largest direct investment from a foreign country.

Kaunas is also known for its programmers, as they developed a software for the American billionaire Robert Pera's Ubiquiti Networks product NanoStation, therefore the company established a R&D division Ubiquiti Networks Europe in Kaunas.

== Demographics ==
Historical population
Year	Pop.	±%
1897	70,920	—
1923	92,446	+30.4%
1959	214,348	+131.9%
1970	305,116	+42.3%
1979	370,419	+21.4%
1989	422,931	+14.2%
2001	378,943	−10.4%
2011	315,993	−16.6%
2021	298,753	−5.5%
Source: pop-stat.mashke.org

Today, with more than 94% of its citizens being ethnic Lithuanians, Kaunas is one of the most Lithuanian cities in the country.

Ethnic composition per the latest census in 2021, out of a total population of 298,753:

1. Lithuanians – 94.4%
2. Russians – 2.9%
3. Ukrainians – 0.3%
4. Poles – 0.4%
5. Belarusians – 0.2%
6. Other – 1.4%

Ethnic composition in 2011, out of a total of 315,933:

1. Lithuanians – 93.6%
2. Russians – 3.8%
3. Ukrainians – 0.4%
4. Poles – 0.4%
5. Belarusians – 0.2%
6. Other – 1.6%

According to the official census of 1923, there were 92,446 inhabitants in Kaunas:

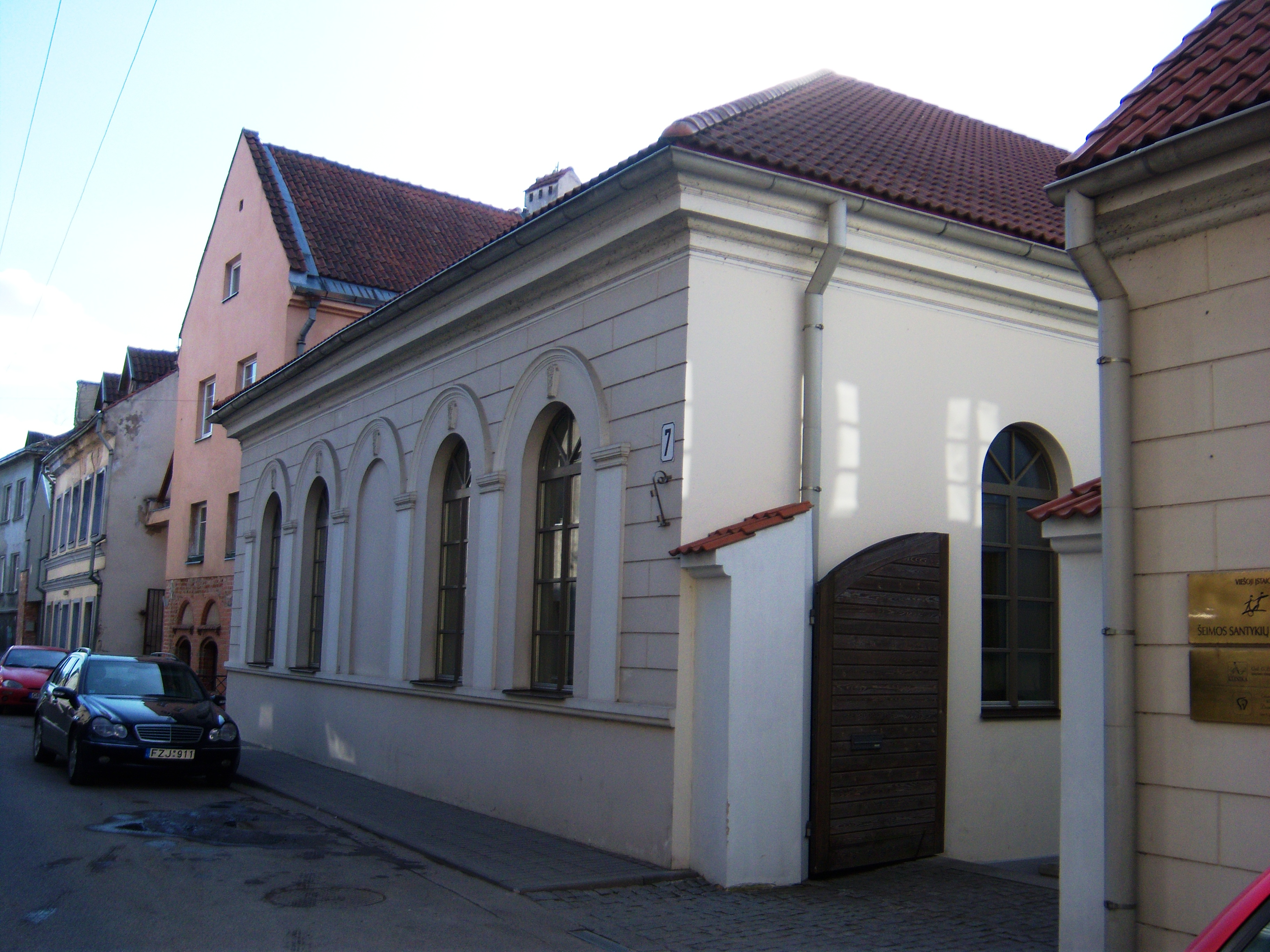
The Neviazh Kloyz is one of the remaining former synagogues located in the Kaunas Old Town. The complex was built in the 19th century and also served as a community house and school.

- Lithuanians – 58.9% (54,520)
- Jews – 27.1% (25,044)
- Poles – 4.5% (4,193)
- Germans – 3.5% (3,269)
- Russians – 3.2% (2,914)
- Belarusians – 0.2% (171)
- Latvians – 0.1% (123)
- Other – 2.4% (2,212)

Ethnic composition in 1919:

- Poles – 42%
- Jews – 31%
- Lithuanians – 16%
- Russians – 1,5%
- Other – 9,5%

1897 Russian census revealed the following linguistic composition in the city (by mother tongue, out of 70,920):

1. Yiddish 25,052 – 35%
2. Russian language 18,308 – 26%
3. Polish language 16,112 – 23%
4. Lithuanian language 4,092 – 6%
5. German language 3,340 – 5%
6. Tatar 1,084 – 2%
7. Other 2932 – 4%

Ethnic composition at the end of the 18th century, the city had 28,000 inhabitants:

1. Poles – 73%
2. Jews – 13%
3. Germans and Dutch – 9%
4. Russians – 4,5%

== Municipality council ==
Kaunas City Municipality main building, where the city council and mayor convenes

Kaunas city municipality council is the governing body of the Kaunas city municipality and is responsible for municipality laws. The council is composed of 41 members (40 councillors and a mayor) all directly elected for four-year terms.

The council is the member of the Association of Local Authorities in Lithuania.

=== Mayors ===
- 1995–1997 – Vladas Katkevičius (Conservative)
- 1997 – Alfonsas Andriuškevičius (Conservative)
- 1997–2000 – Henrikas Tamulis (Conservative)
- 2000 – Vytautas Šustauskas (Liberty Union)
- 2000 – Gediminas Budnikas (Liberty Union)
- 2001–2002 – Erikas Tamašauskas (Liberal)
- 2002–2003 – Giedrius Donatas Ašmys (Social Democrat)
- 2003–2007 – Arvydas Garbaravičius (Liberal-Centrist)
- 2007–2011 – Andrius Kupčinskas (Conservative)
- 2011 – Rimantas Mikaitis (Liberal)
- 2011–2015 Andrius Kupčinskas (Conservative)
- since 2015 – Visvaldas Matijošaitis (Vieningas Kaunas)

== Transportation ==
=== Airports ===
Kaunas International Airport

Kaunas International Airport (KUN) is the second-busiest airport in Lithuania and the fourth-busiest airport in the Baltic states. In 2016, it handled 740,448 passengers (in addition to 2,488 tons of cargo), down from the peak of 872,618 passengers in 2011. Irish low-cost airline Ryanair announced Kaunas Airport as their 40th base and first in Central Europe in February 2010. The smaller S. Darius and S. Girėnas Airport, established in 1915, is located about three kilometres (1.9 mi) south of the city centre. It is one of the oldest still functioning airports in Europe used for tourism and air sports purposes and now hosts the Lithuanian Aviation Museum.

=== Bus stations ===
Kaunas Bus Station

Kaunas bus station went through a major renovation and reopened in 2017. The bus station services domestic and international bus lines. After reconstruction, the bus station has multiple shops and cafes. The total indoor floor area is 13 thousand m2. More than half of the total floor area is underground, mostly for vehicle and bicycle parking. It is Lithuania's largest and busiest bus station with more than 20 bus gates.

=== Highways ===
Kaunas is served by a number of major motorways. European route E67 is a highway running from Prague in the Czech Republic to Helsinki in Finland by way of Poland, Kaunas, Riga (Latvia), and Tallinn (Estonia). It is known as the Via Baltica between Warsaw and Tallinn, a distance of 670 km (416 mi). It is the most important road connection between the Baltic states. Kaunas also is linked to Vilnius to its east and Klaipėda, on the Baltic Sea, via the A1 motorway and Daugavpils (Latvia), via E262(A6) highway.

=== Bridges ===
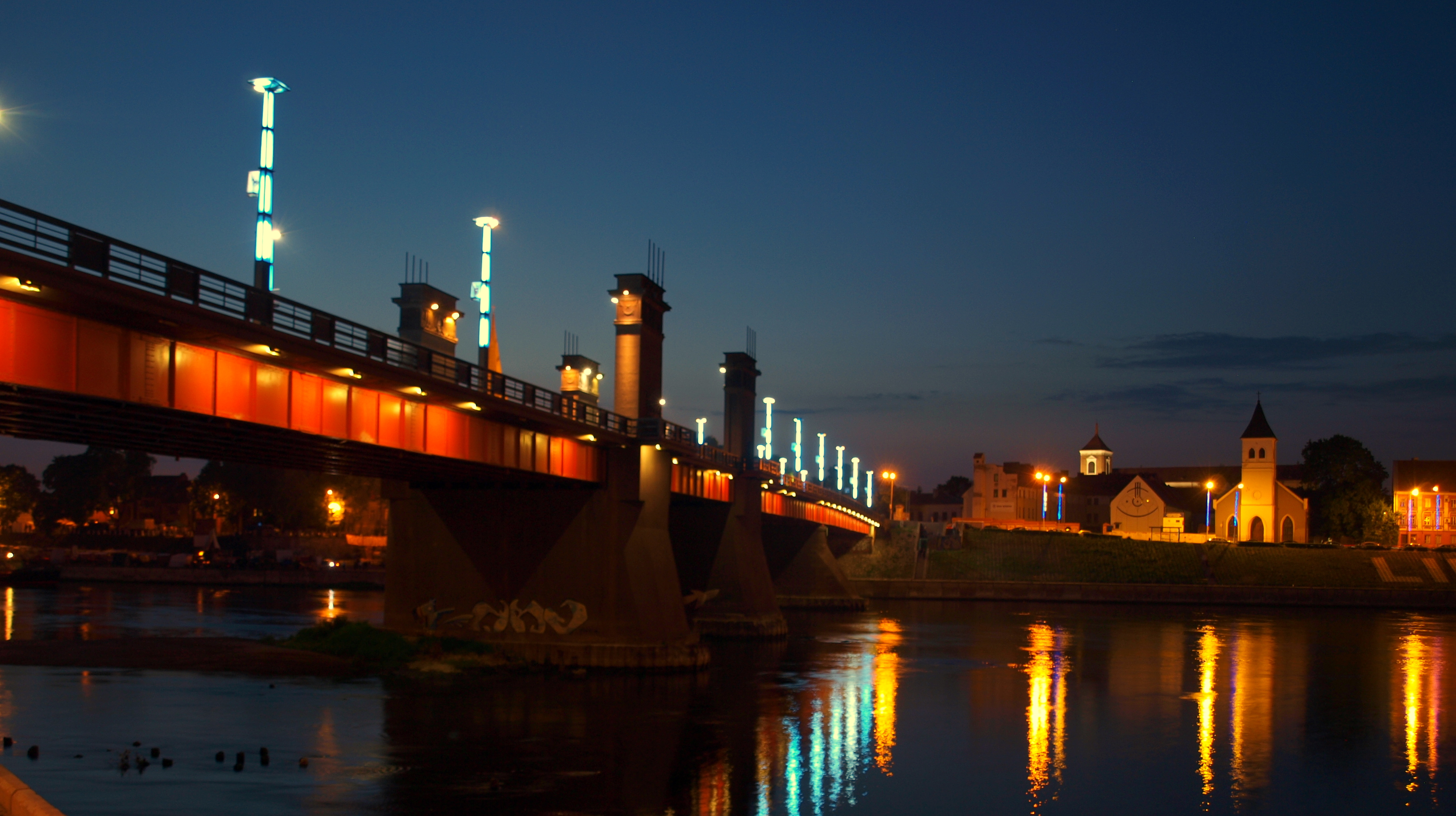
Vytautas the Great Bridge

The construction of the Kaunas Railway Tunnel and Railway Bridge across the Nemunas river helped move goods from the eastern part of Russian Empire west to the German Empire and Kaunas grew rapidly in the second part of the 19th century. The oldest part of Kaunas was connected with Žaliakalnis neighbourhood in 1889. The city increased once more when it was connected by bridges with Aleksotas and Vilijampolė districts in the 1920s.[2]

Since Kaunas is located at the confluence of two rivers, there were 34 bridges and viaducts built in the city at the end of 2007, including:

- Vytautas the Great Bridge, connecting Old Town with Aleksotas across the Nemunas
- M. K. Čiurlionis Bridge, an automotive bridge across the Nemunas
- Lampėdžiai Bridge across the Nemunas that serves as western bypass of Kaunas
- Petras Vileišis Bridge, connecting Old Town with Vilijampolė across the Neris River
- Varniai Bridge, connecting Žaliakalnis with Vilijampolė across the Neris River
- The Green railway bridge, built in 1862

=== Railways ===
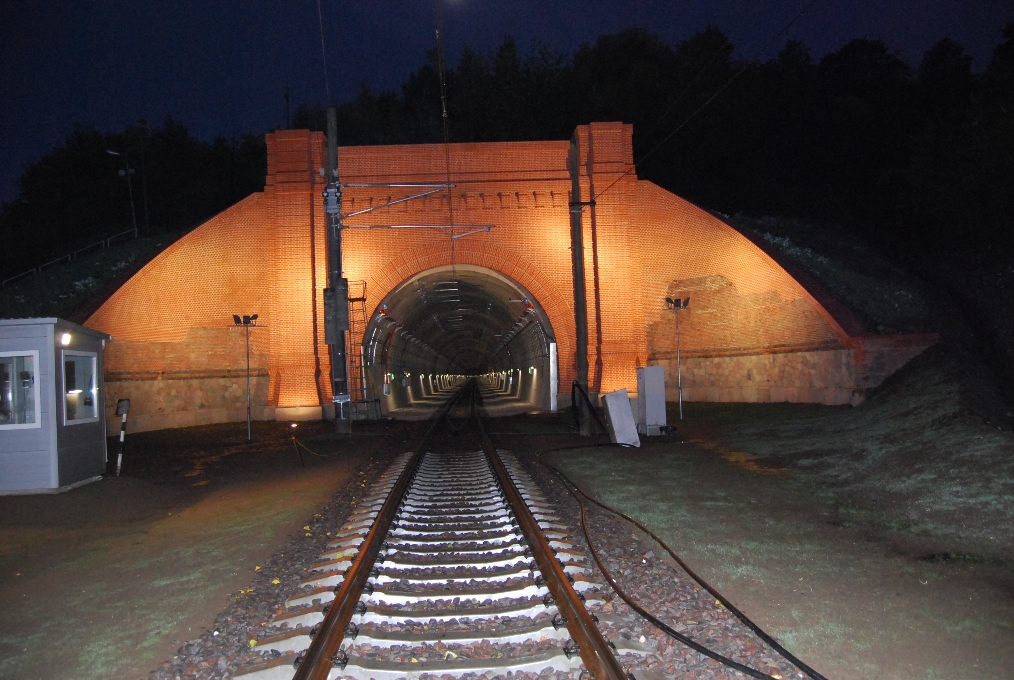
Kaunas Railway Tunnel

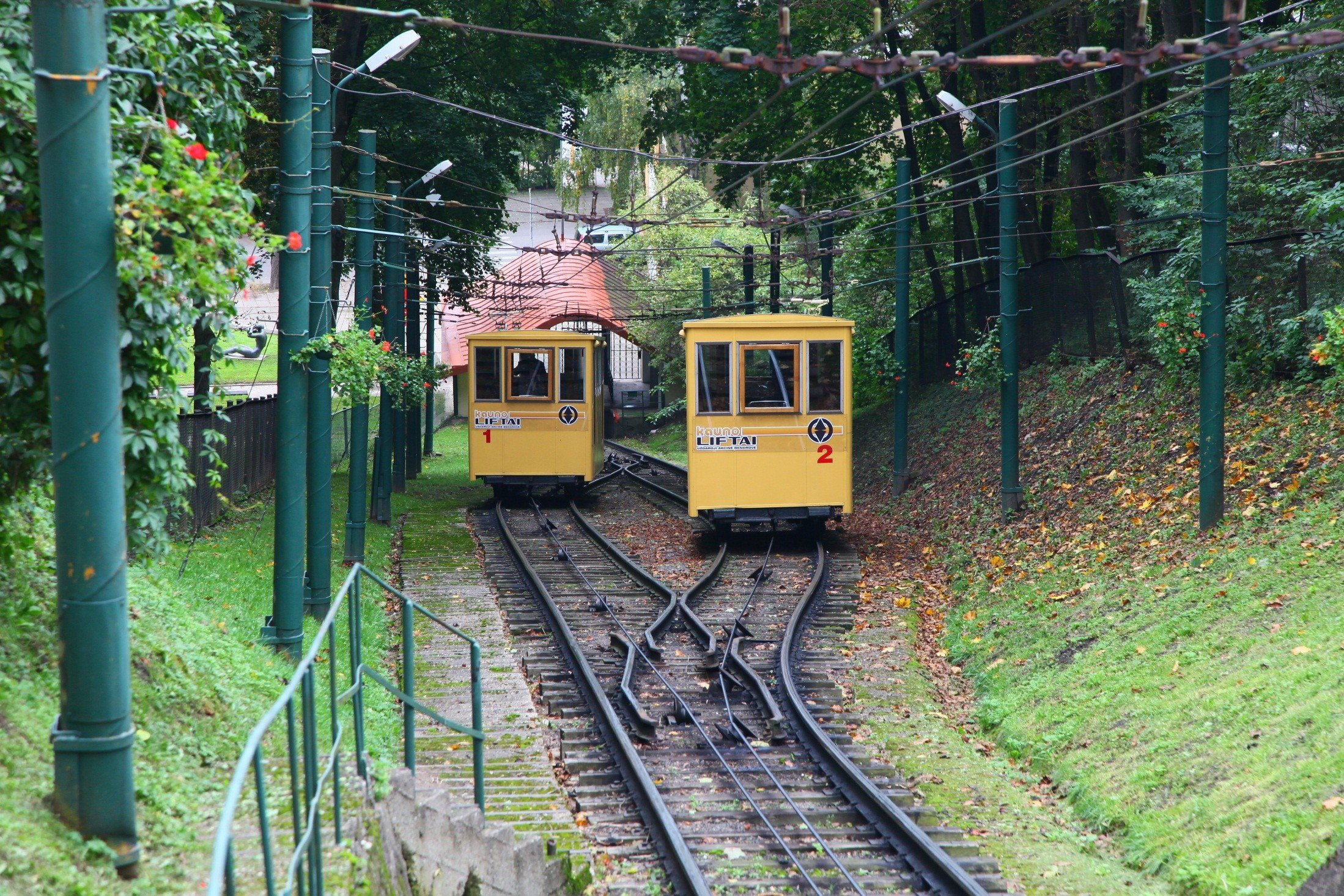
Žaliakalnis funicular. Started operations in the 1930s.

Kaunas is an important railway hub in Lithuania. First railway connection passing through Kaunas was constructed in 1859–1861 and opened in 1862. It consisted of Kaunas Railway Tunnel and the Railway Bridge across the Nemunas river. Kaunas Railway Station is an important hub serving direct passenger connections to Vilnius and Warsaw as well as being a transit point of Pan-European corridors I and IX. Some trains run from Vilnius to Šeštokai, and, Poland, through Kaunas. International route connecting Kaliningrad, Russia and Kharkiv, Ukraine, also crosses Kaunas. The first phase of the Standard gauge Rail Baltica railway section from Šeštokai to Kaunas was completed in 2015.

=== Hydrofoil ===
There used to be a hydrofoil route serving the Port of Nida through Nemunas and across the Curonian Lagoon. It has been repeatedly discontinued and reopened, so the most current status is unclear. The company still exists and has its boats in working condition.

=== Public transportation ===
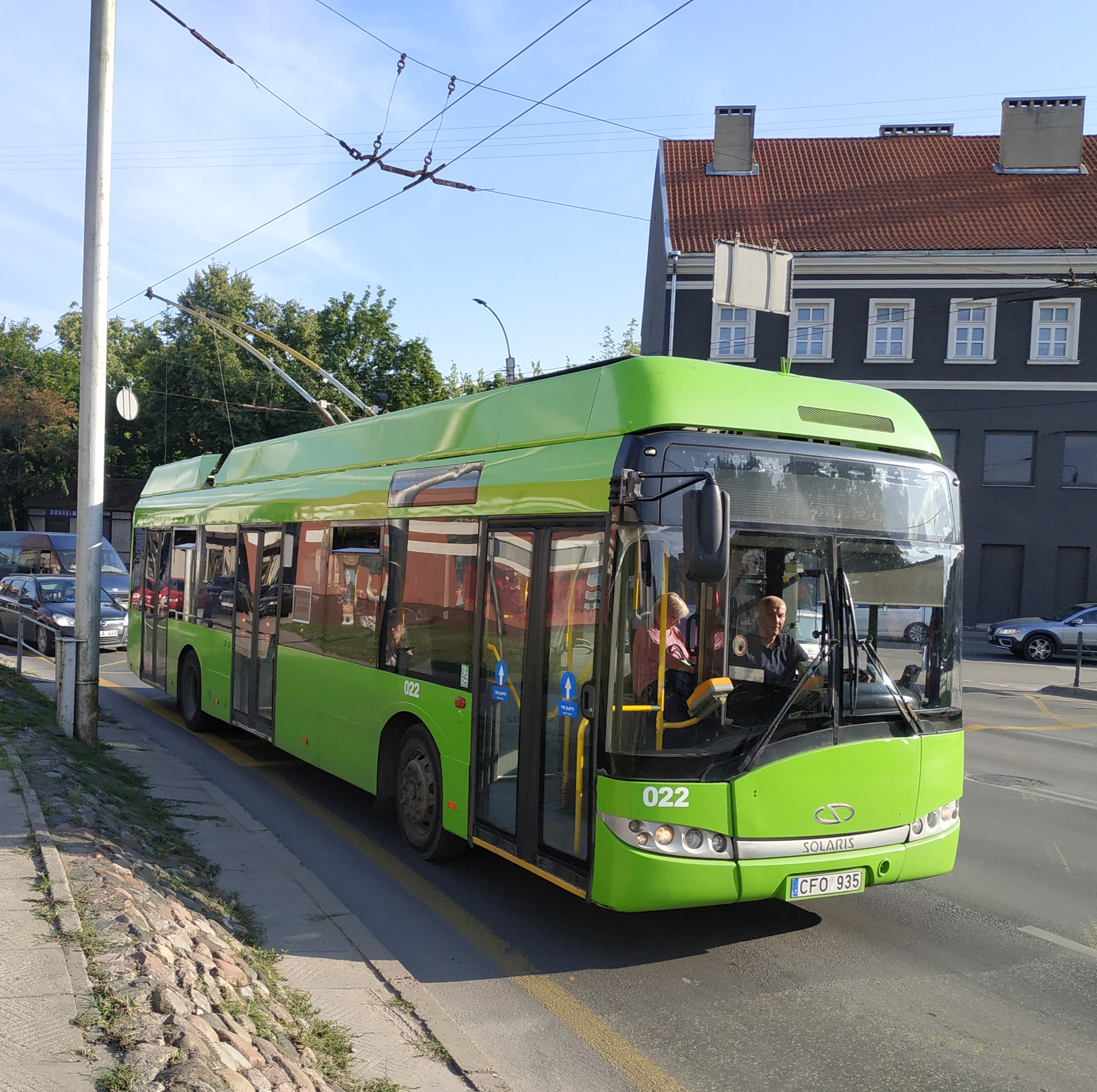
Solaris Trollino 12S trolleybus with the distinctive lime green color in Kaunas

The public transportation system is managed by Kauno viešasis transportas (KVT). There are 14 trolleybus routes, 43 bus routes. In 2007 new electronic monthly tickets began to be introduced for public transport in Kaunas. The monthly E-ticket cards may be bought once and might be credited with an appropriate amount of money in various ways including the Internet. Previous paper monthly tickets were in use until August 2009. Kaunas is also one of the major river ports in the Baltic States and has two piers designated for tourism purposes and located on the banks of Nemunas river and Kaunas Reservoir—the largest Lithuanian artificial lake, created in 1959 by damming the Nemunas near Kaunas and Rumšiškės.

In 2015, Kauno autobusai bought four Van Hool AGG300 to serve the mostly populated 37th route. These are the longest buses used in the Baltic states. The bus station in Kaunas underwent reconstruction for six months and reopened on 23 January 2017. It is the largest and most modern bus station in Lithuania. In 2017, Kauno autobusai began planning to cardinally upgrade the trolleybuses and buses park till the end of 2019. The new Mercedes-Benz minibuses were introduced on 2 September 2019. The first new trolleybuses Škoda 26Tr Solaris were publicly introduced on 30 September 2019. In November 2019, Kauno autobusai signed a contract for 100 new model units of MAN Lion's City 12 hybrid electric buses, which replaced over half of city's old buses.

Kaunas public transport has a mobile app Žiogas (English: Grasshopper) which allow to purchase and activate digital tickets using a smartphone. After reaching the E-ticket card's monthly fee (28 Eur), the remaining trips are free of charge until the end of the month.

Kaunas has two funiculars: Žaliakalnis Funicular and Aleksotas Funicular. Both are from the 1930s. Aleksotas Funicular works every day from 7am to 7pm (a break from 12pm to 1pm). Žaliakalnis Funicular works from Monday to Friday from 8am to 5pm.

== Sports ==
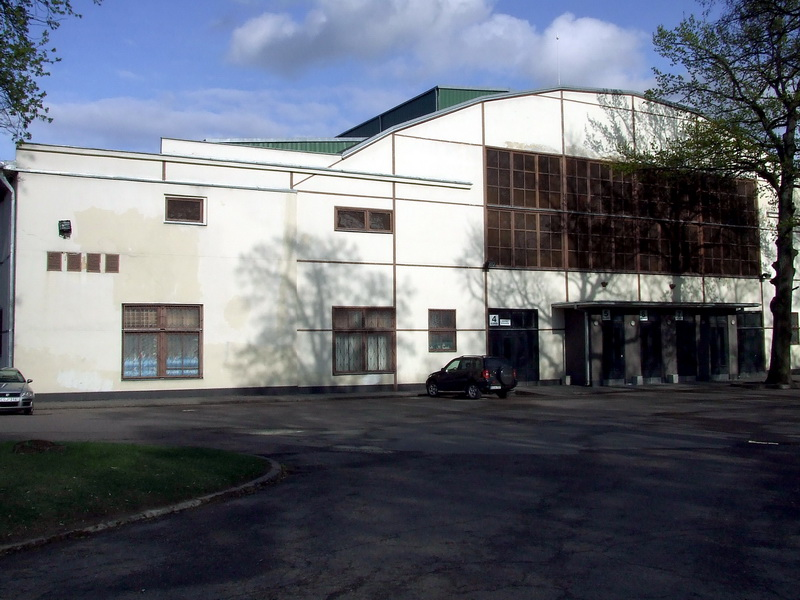
Kaunas Sports Hall

Darius and Girėnas Stadium

Žalgiris Arena

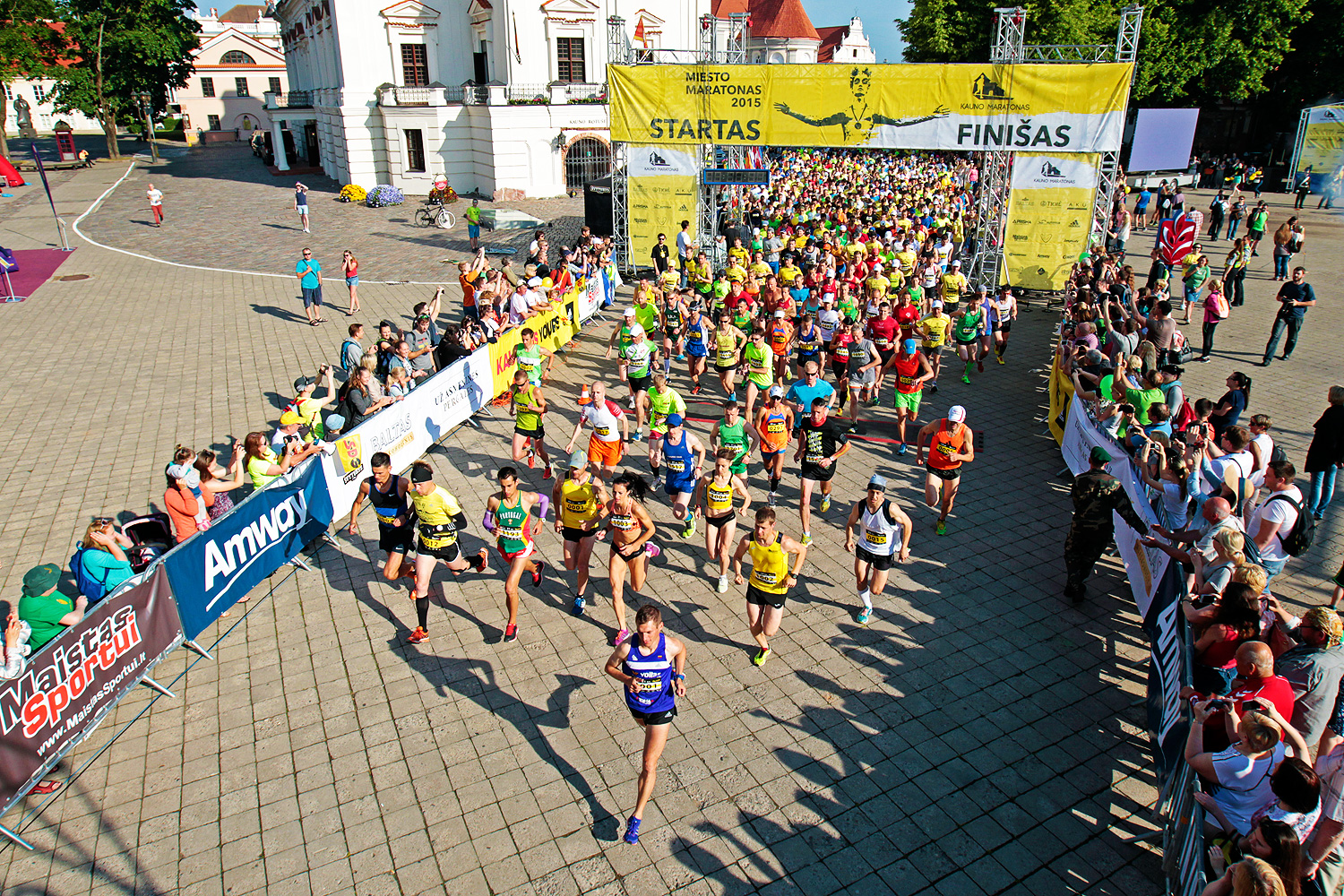
Kaunas Marathon in 2015

The Lithuanian House of Basketball

Sports in Kaunas have a long and distinguished history. Team and individual sports like football, baseball, ice hockey, rugby, track and field, orienteering are all considered popular in the city, although basketball is considered the most popular. The city is home to a few historic clubs such as: LFLS Kaunas football club (est. 1920), LFLS Kaunas baseball club (est. 1922), Granitas Kaunas (handball club, EHF Cup champions in 1987), Žalgiris basketball club (est. 1944, EuroLeague champions in 1999).

Kaunas is home to some historic venues such as: the main stadium of the city—Darius and Girėnas Stadium (total capacity after renovation 15,315), which is also the home stadium for football clubs from Kaunas and the Lithuanian national football team established in 1923, and Kaunas Sports Hall, completed in 1939 for the Third European Basketball Championship. Darius and Girėnas Stadium is also used as the only large athletics stadium in Lithuania. On 16 October 2022 the Darius and Girėnas Stadium was reopened as a UEFA 4th class stadium following a reconstruction for 43 million euros.

Ice hockey was first played in Lithuania in 1922. The first Lithuanian ice hockey championship composed of four teams (LFLS, KSK, Kovas, and Macabi) was held in Kaunas, in 1926.

The Kaunas Marathon is an international marathon with thousands of Lithuanian and foreign participants every year.

In July 1938 Kaunas, together with Klaipėda (where sailing and rowing competitions were held), hosted the Lithuanian National Olympiad that gathered the Lithuanian athletes from all around the world.

The university status Lithuanian Academy of Physical Education, founded during the interwar period, is the only state-supported institution of tertiary physical education in Lithuania.

The city is also the birthplace or childhood home of many of the country's top basketball stars, among them Arvydas Sabonis, Šarūnas Marčiulionis, Zydrunas Ilgauskas, Linas Kleiza, Donatas Motiejūnas and Šarūnas Jasikevičius. Kaunas is also the home to one of the most successful men's basketball clubs in Europe - BC Žalgiris.

Kaunas is home to some historic venues such as: the main stadium of the city—Darius and Girėnas Stadium (total capacity after renovation 15,315), which is also the home stadium for the Žalgiris Kaunas football team (as the recently formed branch of the bigger basketball club - BC Žalgiris) and Lithuanian national football team established in 1923 and the Kaunas Sports Hall, opened in 1923, which is considered one of the legendary basketball courts in Europe (that hosted some of the first European basketball tournaments).

The city is home to handball club HC Granitas-Karys that won the EHF Cup in 1987.

The first golf club "Elnias" in Lithuania was opened in Kaunas in 2000.

Nemuno žiedas is Lithuania's only motor racing circuit, situated in Kačerginė, a small town near Kaunas.

A yacht club operates in the Kaunas Reservoir Regional Park.

A round of the UIM F2 World Championship is held by the site of the old Kaunas Lagoon pier every year. The powerboat race is organised by Edgaras Riabko who also competes in the event.

Kaunas was one of the host cities for the 2021 FIFA Futsal World Cup.

During 10–14 January 2024, Kaunas hosted the 2024 European Figure Skating Championships in the Žalgiris Arena.

== Annual events ==
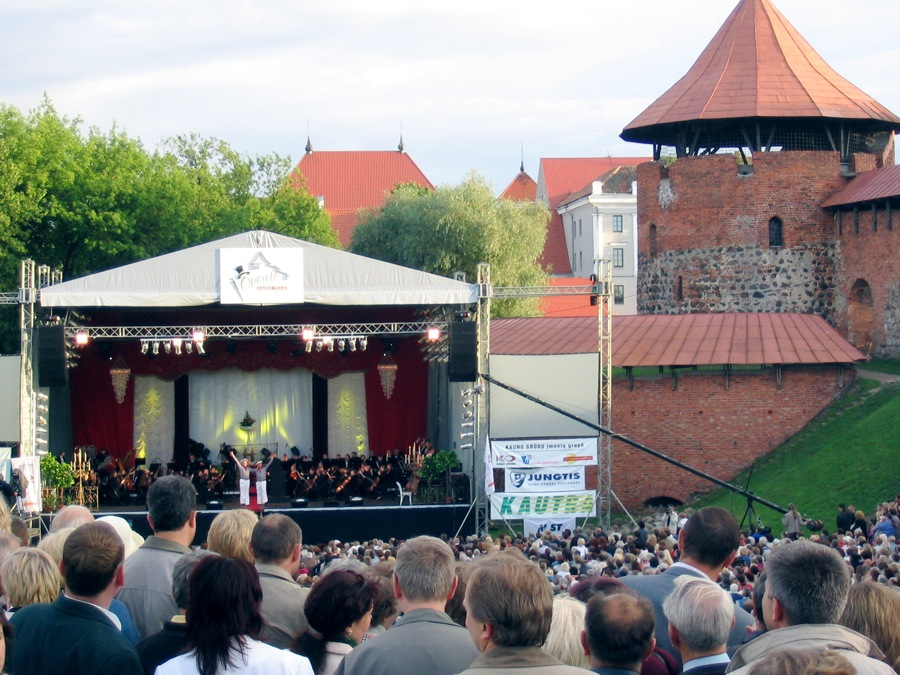
Opera at the Kaunas Castle

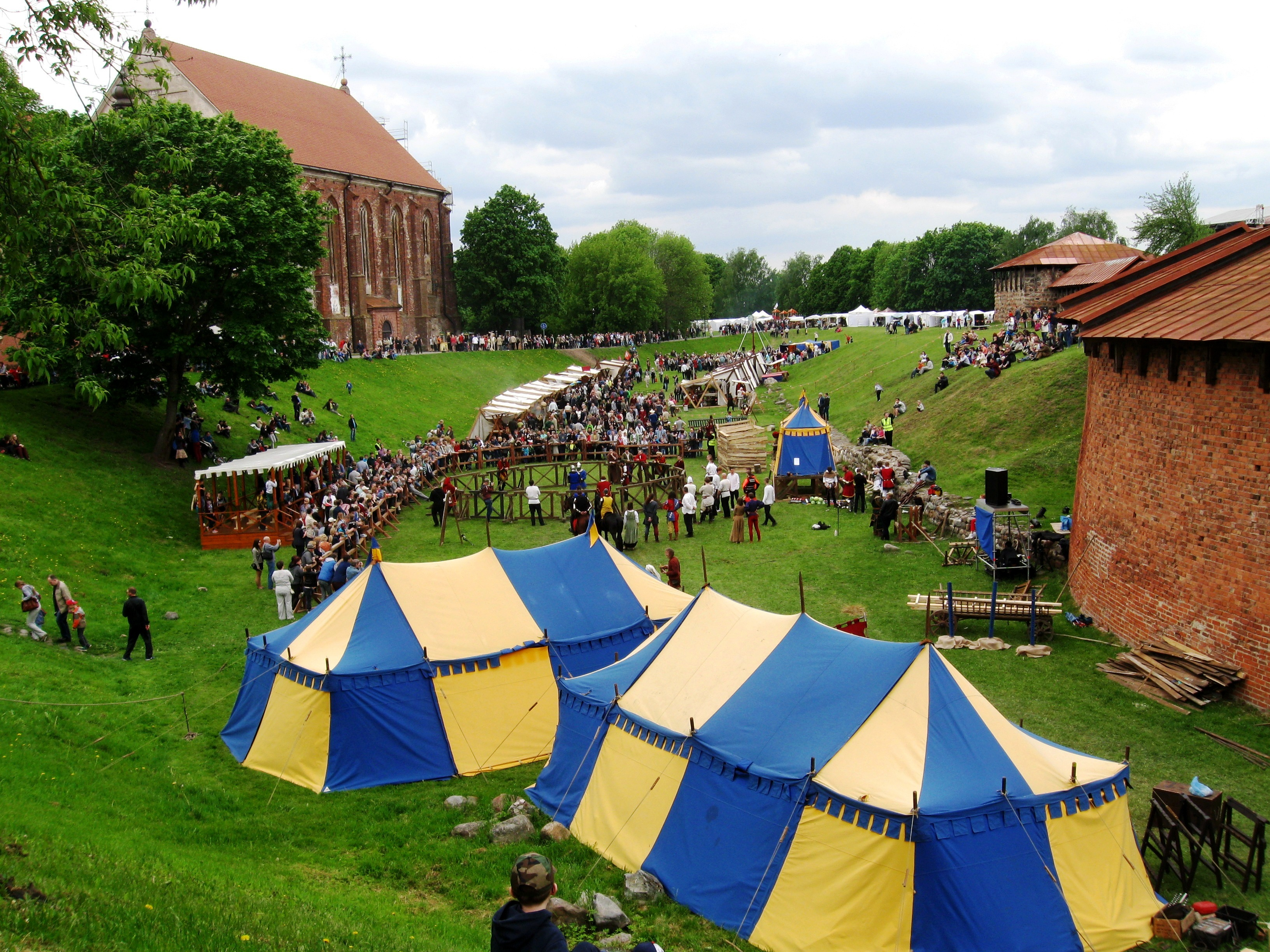
Hanseatic Days in Kaunas

Kaunas is best known for the Kaunas Jazz Festival, International Operetta Festival, Photo Art Festival "Kaunas photo" or Pažaislis Music Festival, which usually run from early June until late August each year. The open-air concerts of the historical 49-bell Kaunas Carillon are held on weekends. Probably the longest established festival is the International Modern Dance Festival, which first ran in 1989.

- Kaziukas Fair Kaunas fork (beginning of March)
- International open-air "Kaunas Jazz Festival" (April–May)
- Day of Kaunas city (middle of May)
- Pažaislis music festival (June–August)
- Traditional folk music competition "Play, Jurgelis" (November)
- Christmas tree lighting (end of November)

== Significant depictions in popular culture ==
- Kaunas is one of the starting towns of Lithuania in the turn-based strategy game Medieval II: Total War: Kingdoms.
- Some scenes of HBO's miniseries Chernobyl were filmed in Kaunas.
- HBO's miniseries Catherine the Great, featuring Helen Mirren, was also filmed in the Pažaislis Monastery in Kaunas.
- The 2018 historical drama film Ashes in the Snow is partly based in 1941 in Kaunas.

== Twin towns – sister cities ==
Kaunas is twinned with:

- Białystok, Poland
- Brescia, Italy
- Brno, Czech Republic
- Cava de' Tirreni, Italy
- Ferrara, Italy
- Grenoble, France
- Hiratsuka, Japan
- Kharkiv, Ukraine
- Linköping, Sweden
- Lippe (district), Germany
- Los Angeles, United States
- Lutsk, Ukraine
- Lviv Oblast, Ukraine
- Myślibórz, Poland
- Odense, Denmark
- Rende, Italy
- Riga, Latvia
- Rishon LeZion, Israel
- San Martín, Argentina
- Tampere, Finland
- Tartu, Estonia
- Toruń, Poland
- Växjö, Sweden
- Vestfold, Norway
- Vestland, Norway
- Wrocław, Poland
- Xiamen, China
- Dunavarsány, Hungary
- Yaotsu, Japan

The city was previously twinned with:

- Kaliningrad, Russia
- Saint Petersburg, Russia

== Honours ==
A minor planet 73059 Kaunas, discovered by Lithuanian astronomers Kazimieras Černis and Justas Zdanavičius, in 2002, is named after the city of Kaunas.

== See also ==
- Das Vort, defunct newspaper
