= Neighborhoods of Kaunas =

Neighborhoods of Kaunas and its metropolitan area:

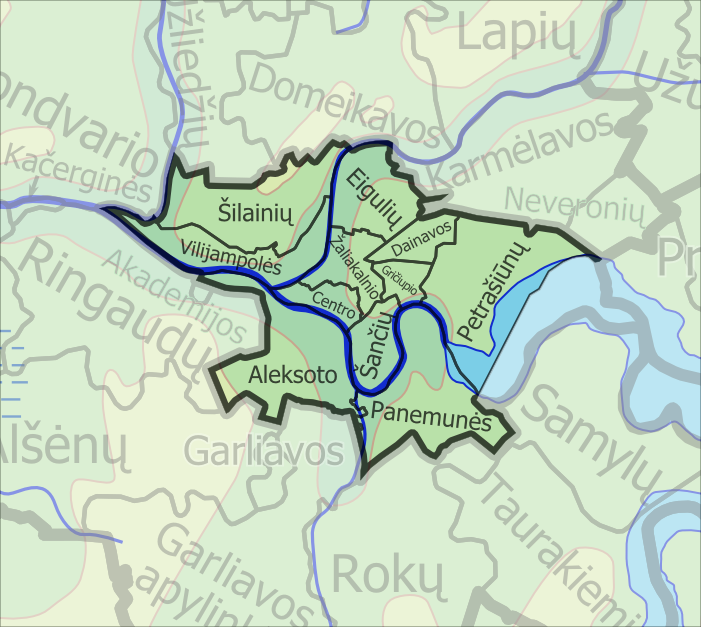
Kaunas' elderates

- Akademija
- Aleksotas
- Centras
- Dainava
- Domeikava
- Eiguliai
- Garliava
- Giraitė
- Gričiupis
- Karmėlava
- Senamiestis (old town)
- Panemunė
- Petrašiūnai
- Ramučiai
- Raudondvaris
- Šančiai
- Šilainiai
- Vilijampolė
- Žaliakalnis
- Romainiai
