= Dainava =

Dainava may refer to:

- Dainava, an alternative name for Dzūkija, a region of Lithuania
- Dainava (Kaunas), a neighbourhood in Kaunas city, Lithuania
- Dainava (Varėna), a village in Varėna district municipality, Alytus County, Lithuania
- FK Dainava Alytus, Lithuanian football club
