= Kaunas Lutheran Holy Trinity Church =

Church in Kaunas, Lithuania

Kaunas Lutheran Holy Trinity Church Kauno liuteronų Švč. Trejybės bažnyčia
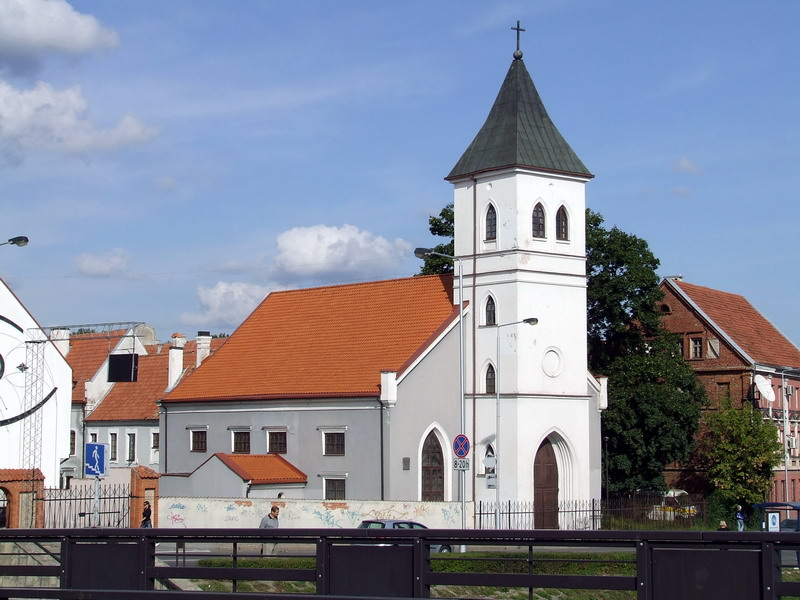
- Main façade of the church

Religion
- Affiliation: Lutheranism
- District: Old Town

Location
- Location: Kaunas, Lithuania
- Interactive map of Kaunas Lutheran Holy Trinity Church; Kauno liuteronų Švč. Trejybės bažnyčia
- Coordinates: 54°53′42.52″N 23°53′19.25″E

Architecture
- Type: Church
- Style: Gothic
- Completed: 1683

Specifications
- Spire: 1
- Materials: Masonry (brick)

Website
- liuteronai.lt

Kaunas Lutheran Holy Trinity Church (Lithuanian: Kauno liuteronų Švč. Trejybės bažnyčia) is a Lutheran church in the Old Town of Kaunas, Lithuania. It is one of the first Lutheran churches in Kaunas, built in 1683. The wooden main altar dates from 1692. The church was closed by the Soviet authorities, nowadays it used by the local university.

== Sources ==
- Szulakowska, Urszula (2018). Renaissance and Baroque Art and Culture in the Eastern Polish-Lithuanian Commonwealth (1506-1696). Cambridge Scholar Publishing. p. 324. ISBN 978-1-5275-1135-4.
