= Ąžuolynas =

Public park in Kaunas, Lithuania

Coordinates: 54.900°N 23.944°E

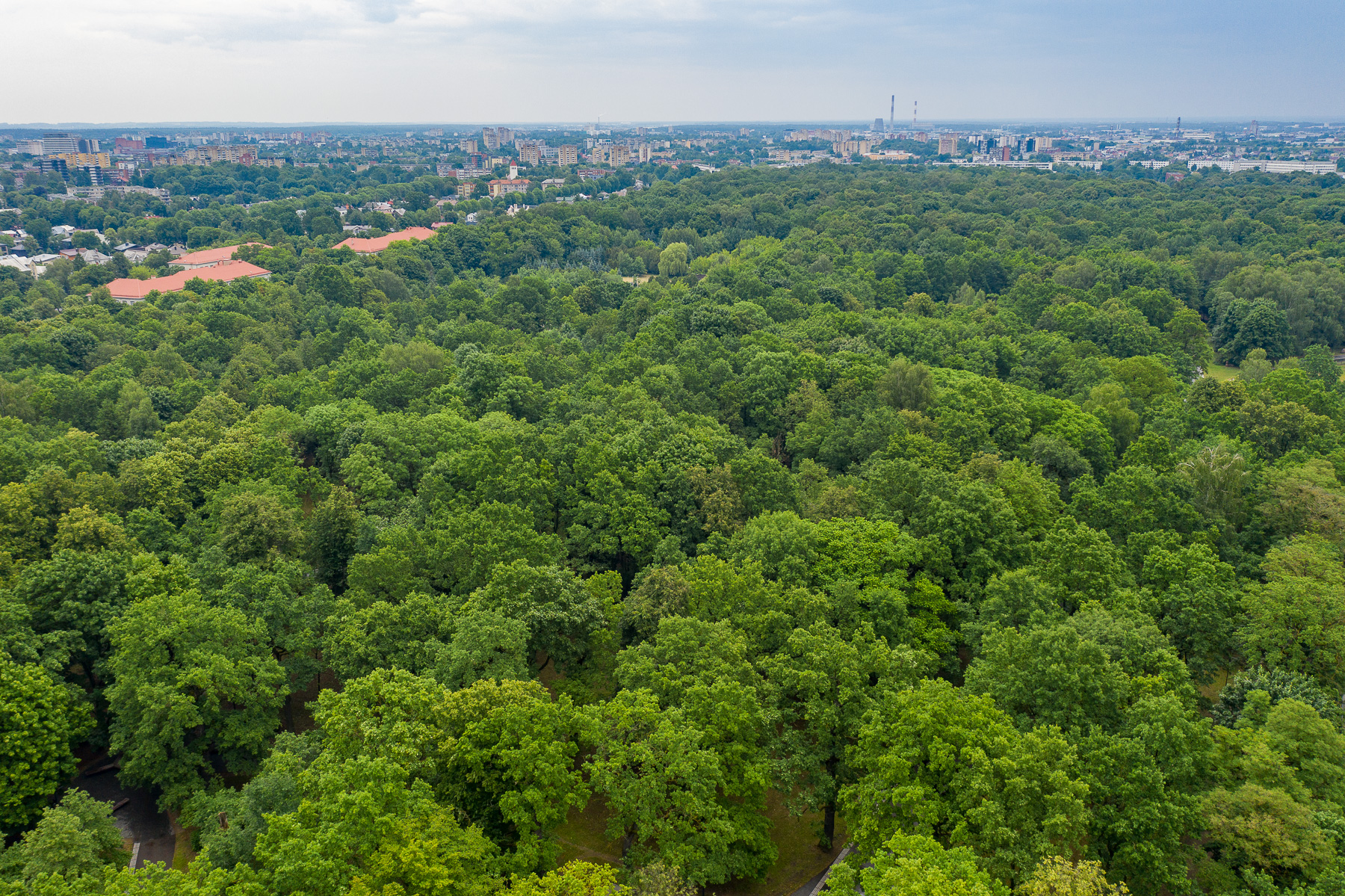
Bird's view of the park.

Ąžuolynas (lit. 'Oak Grove') is a public park in Lithuania's second largest city, Kaunas, in the Žaliakalnis elderate. The park covers about 84 hectares and is the largest urban stand of mature oaks in Europe. Vydūnas Alley serves as the park's northern border. It is a popular recreational destination for the inhabitants of Kaunas. Most of its trees are oaks ranging in age from 100 to 320 years old, but it also holds linden, birch, and maple trees.

The current park is what remains of a much larger oak forest that grew around the city, and was connected to the forests in Karmėlava, Rumšiškės and Kaišiadorys. Those forests were cut down during the 14th, 15th, and 16th centuries, and the timber was used in city buildings, bridges, castles, and ships. The section of the forest between Kaunas and Garliava was cut down in the 19th century.

A valley in the park is named for the poet Adam Mickiewicz, who rested there during his days as a teacher in Kaunas schools. In 1938 Tadas Ivanauskas established the Kaunas Zoo in the northern corner of the park. A year later Kaunas Sports Hall, which hosted Eurobasket 1939, was established near Ąžuolynas. The park's infrastructure was reconstructed in 1955; in 1966 the Valley of Songs (Lithuanian: Dainų slėnis) was installed. The park is used extensively for sports activities of students of the Lithuanian Academy of Physical Education located nearby. A section of Ąžuolynas, Vytautas Park, contains a number of recreational attractions for children.

== Photos ==
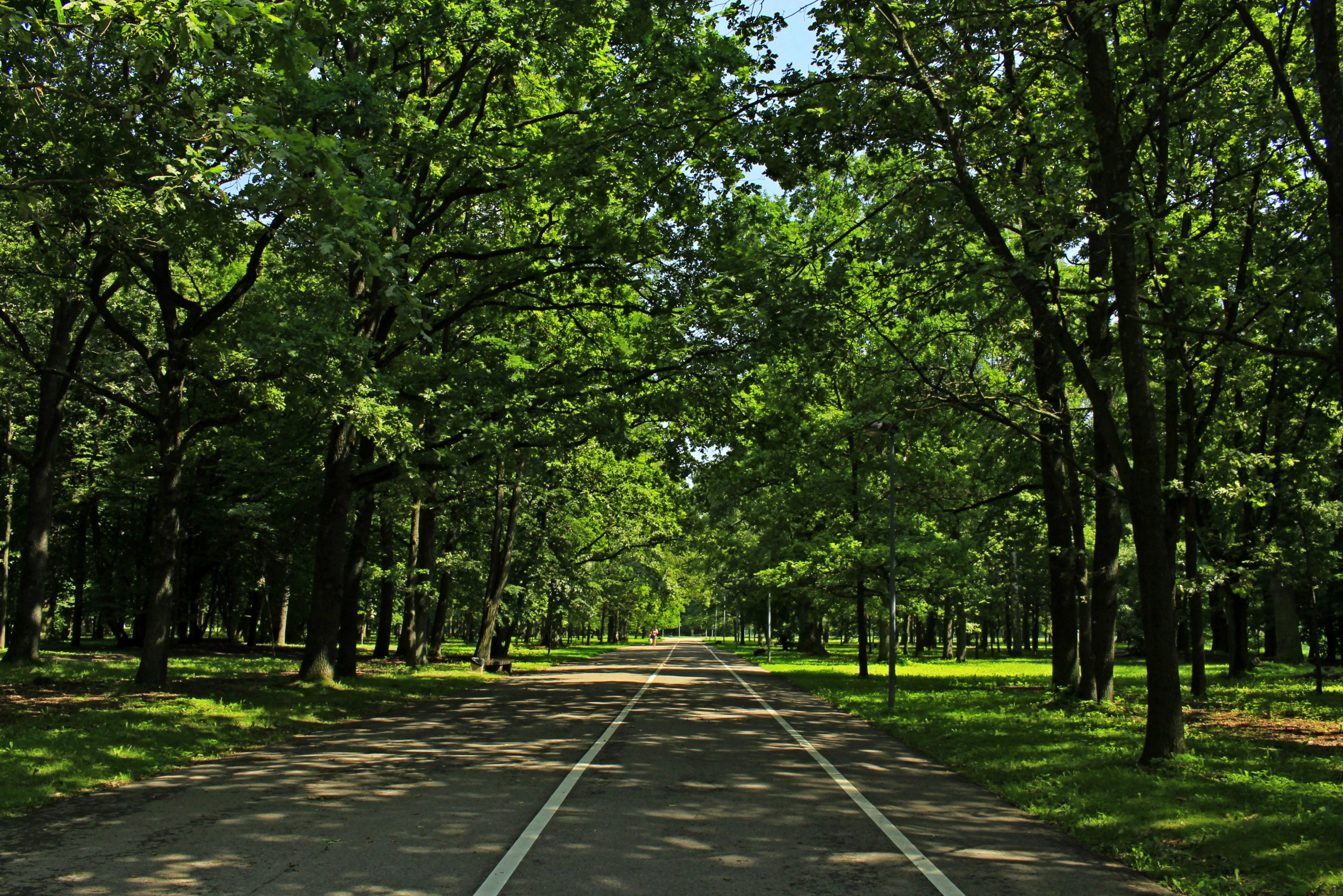
A promenade in Ąžuolynas.

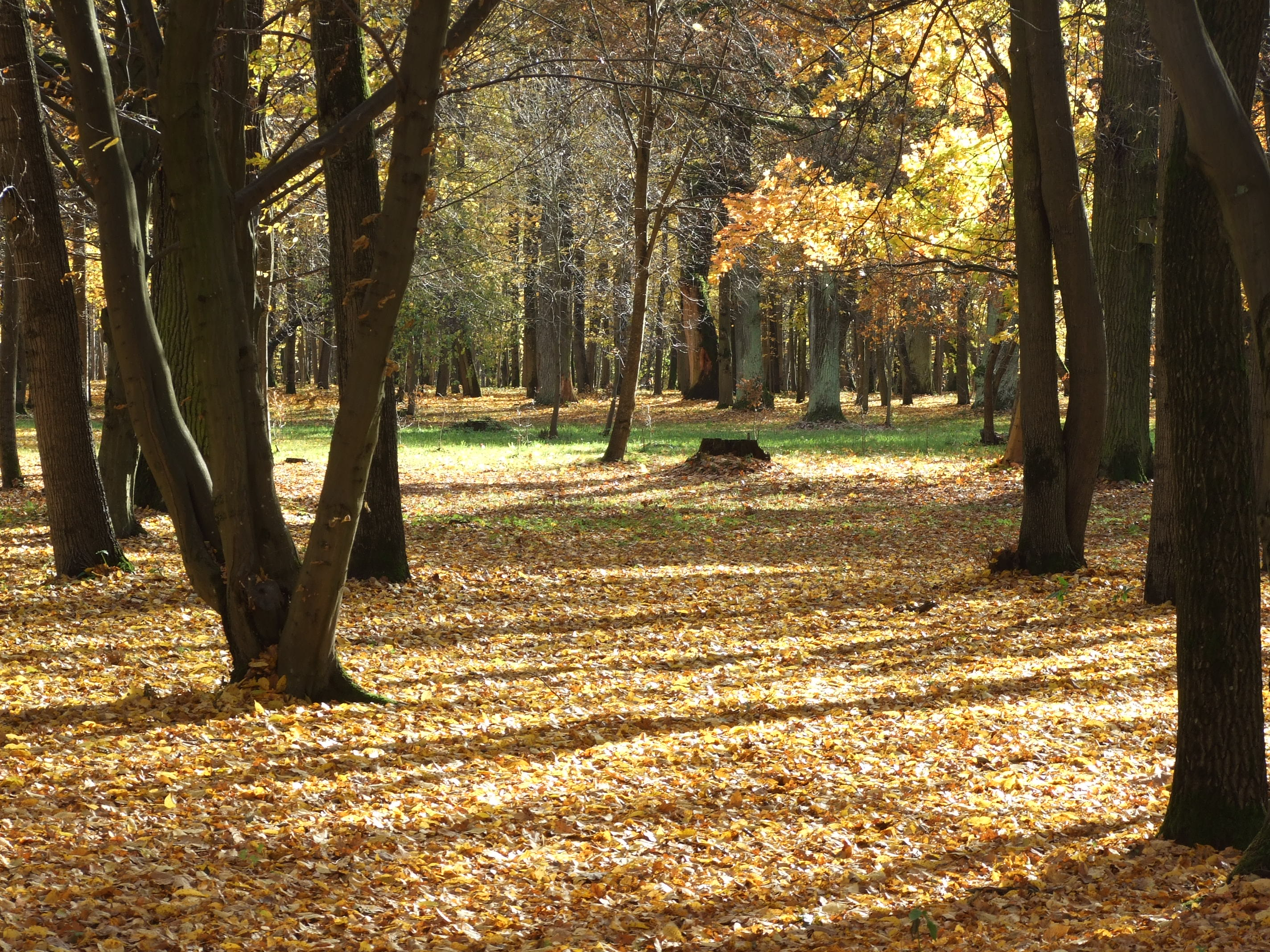
Ąžuolynas in autumn.

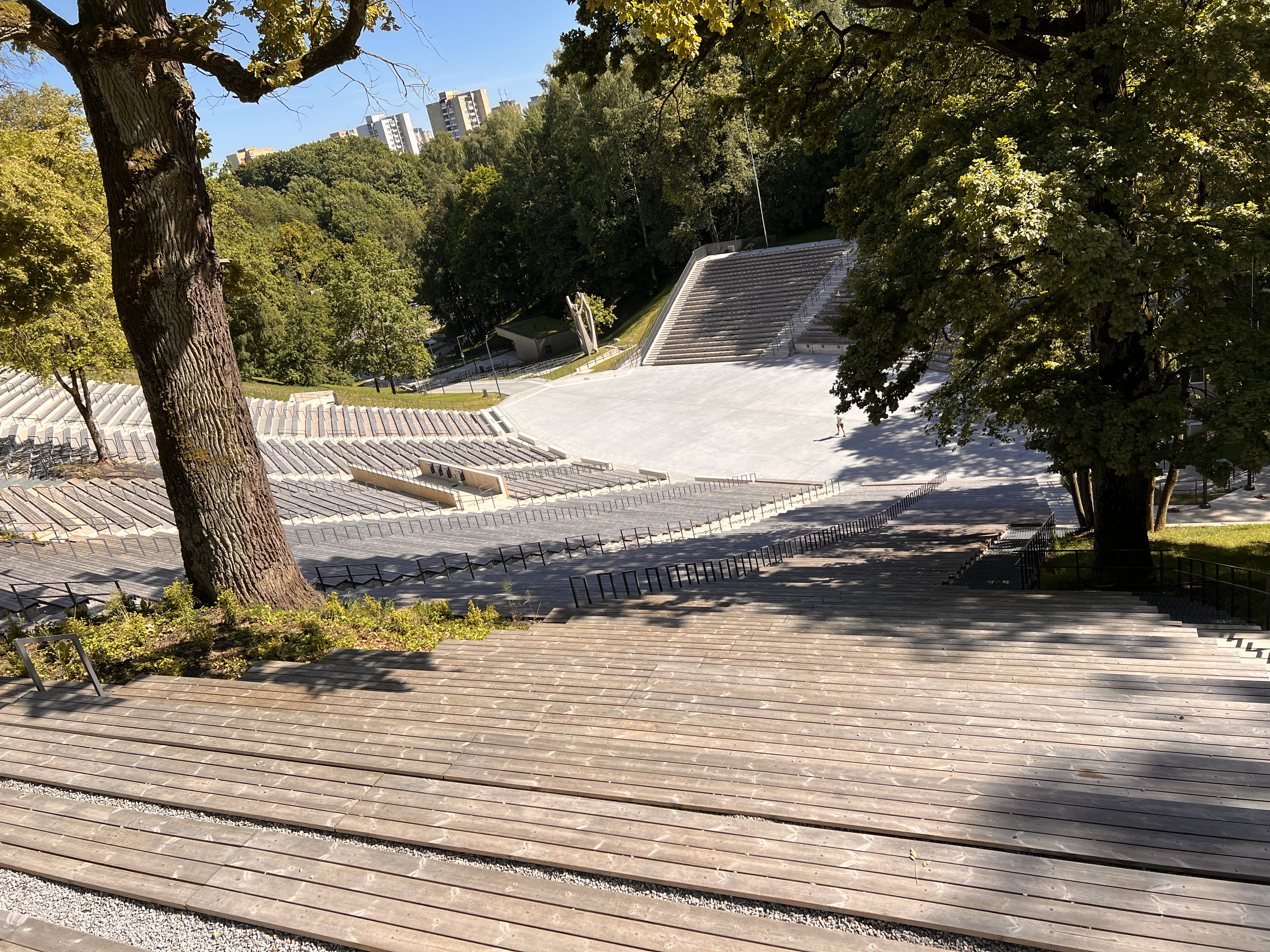
The open-air amphitheatre "Valley of Songs" (Dainų slėnis)

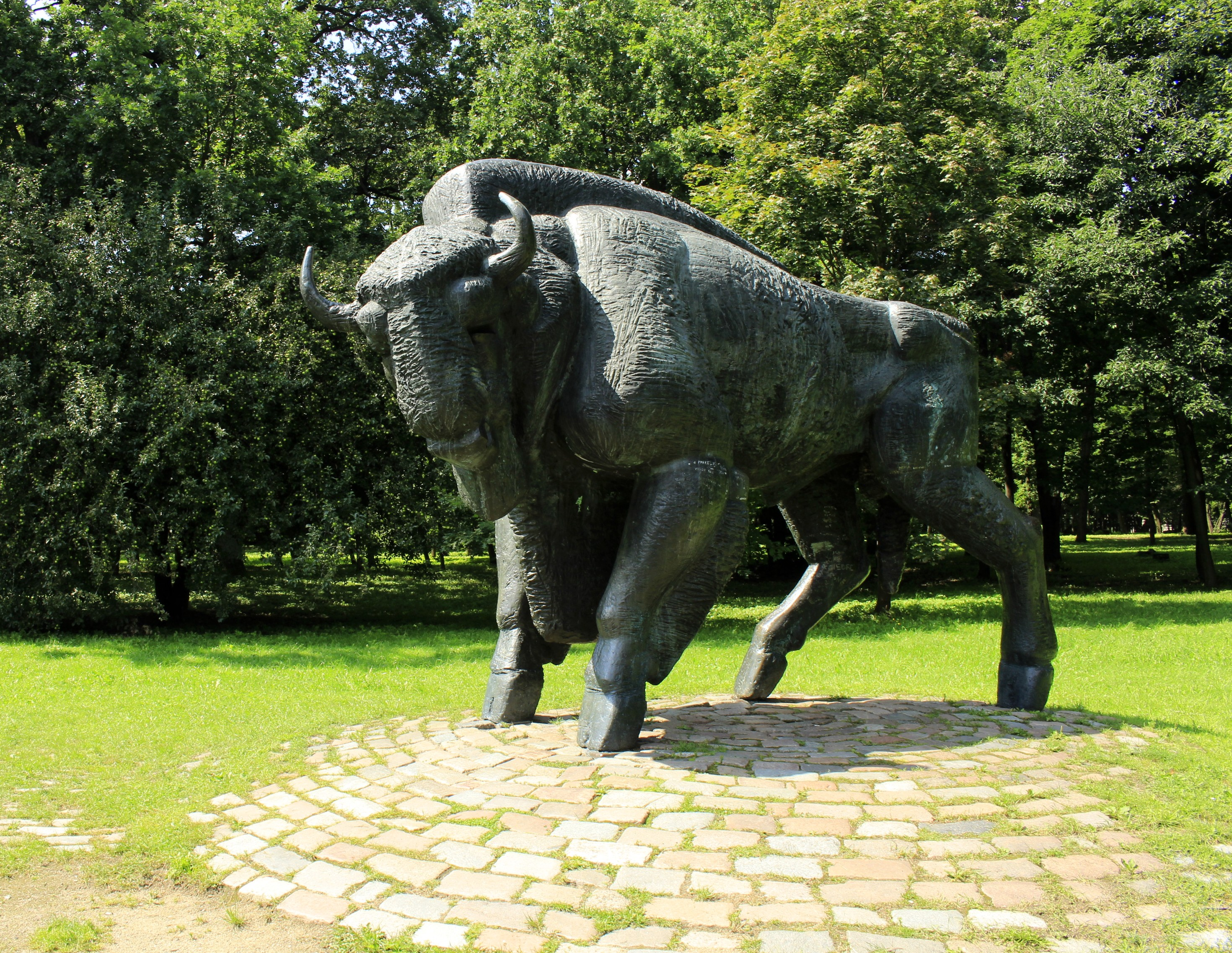
The sculpture "Bison" (Stumbro) by Daliutė Ona Matulaitė from 1979 in the middle of the park.

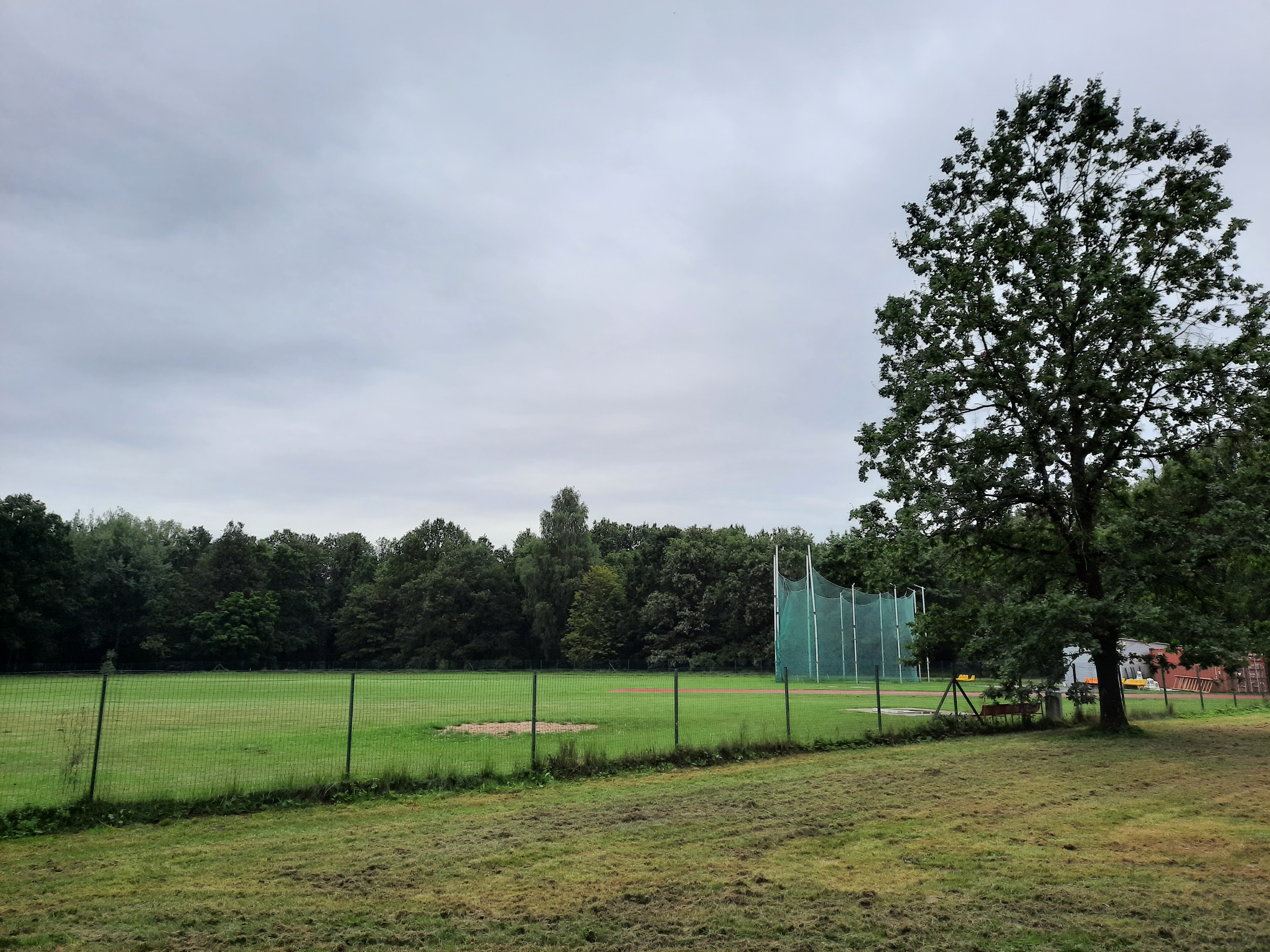
The pitch.
