= Vydūnas alley =

Is a street in the former capital of lithuania

Coordinates: 54°54′08″N 23°56′22″E

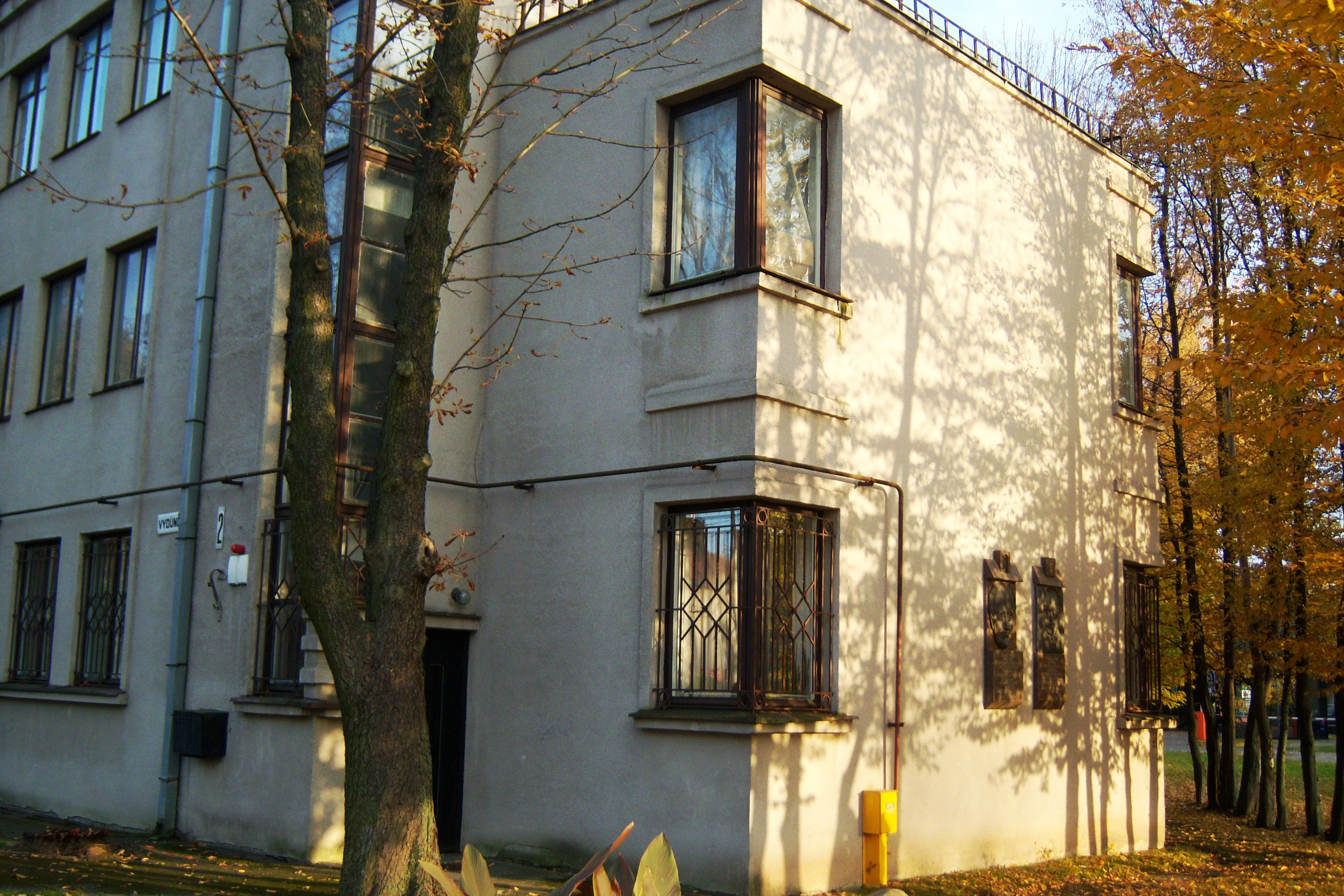
House of Galaunė on Vydūnas alley

Vydūnas alley is an avenue in Kaunas, Žaliakalnis neighbourhood, bordering Ąžuolynas park in the north.

It was built by a special plan as a residential area of the temporary capital of Lithuania. The alley was built according to writings of Lithuanian philosopher Vydūnas and was intersected with two radial streets – Minties ratas (Ring of Thought) and Gėlių ratas (Ring of Flowers).
