= Old Kaunas Ducal Palace =

Building complex in Kaunas Old Town, Lithuania

Coordinates: 54°53′45″N 23°53′14″E

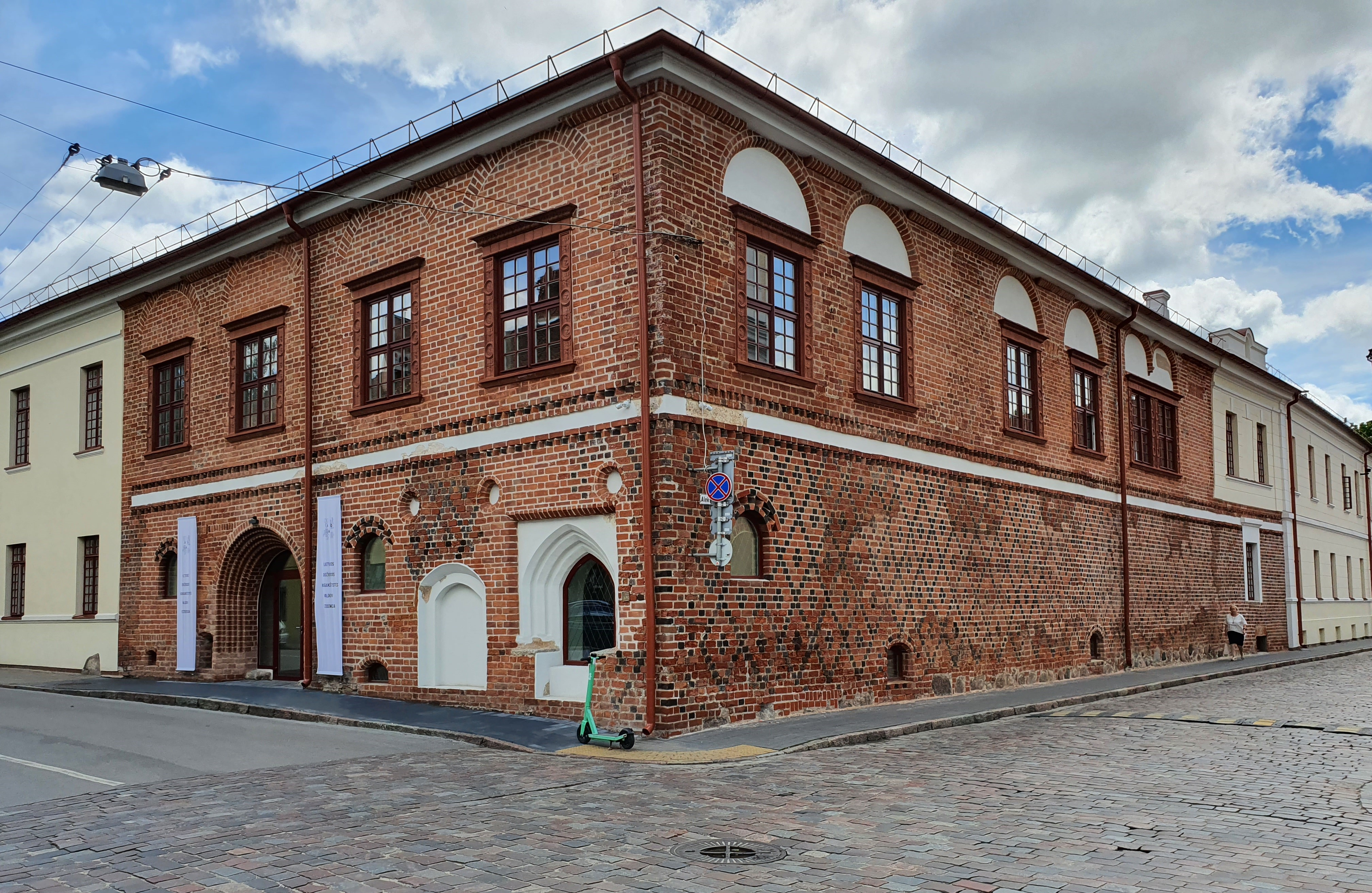
Old Kaunas Ducal Palace

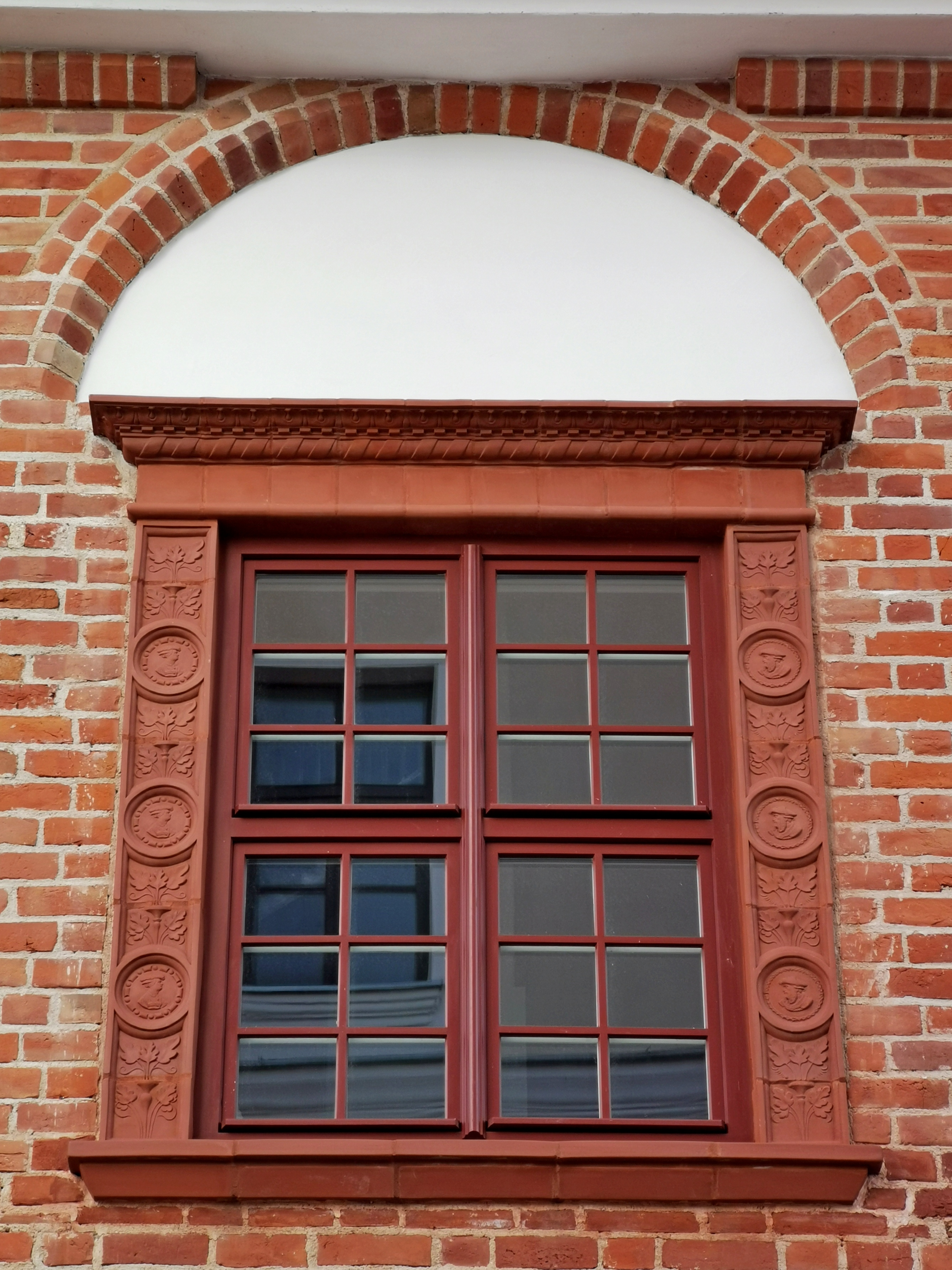
Window frame decor

The Old Kaunas Ducal Palace (Lithuanian: Senieji Kauno kunigaikščių rūmai) is a building complex at the corner of Aleksoto and Muitinės Streets in Kaunas Old Town, Lithuania. It was a psychiatric hospital, but is now owned by the Kaunas Academy of Arts institute.

== History ==
The palace, which was ruined and rebuilt multiple times due to wars, dates back to the 15th century. According to various historical sources, the palace was a Franciscan monastery, a powiat court, a merchants' house and a city firefighters' headquarters. In the 16th century, the palace was used as the residential building of a grand duke. According to L.Potockis, in the 16th century, the palace was used by Lithuanian and Polish heads of state while visiting Kaunas, due to floods at Kaunas Castle.

Casimir IV Jagiellon lived in the palace while hiding from the plague with his six children, including Saint Casimir.

The Polish–Lithuanian Commonwealth head of state Sigismund II Augustus also lived in the palace multiple times.

At the end of the 19th century, Russian province architect S.Gorskis was ordered to convert the building complex into a city hospital. Starting in 1951, the unique and historical building complex was used as the Kaunas psychiatric hospital with a capacity of 200 patients.

Currently, the building complex is owned by Kaunas Academy of Arts institute and was reconstructed.
