= Vilniaus Street, Kaunas =

Street in the Kaunas, Lithuania

Vilniaus Street
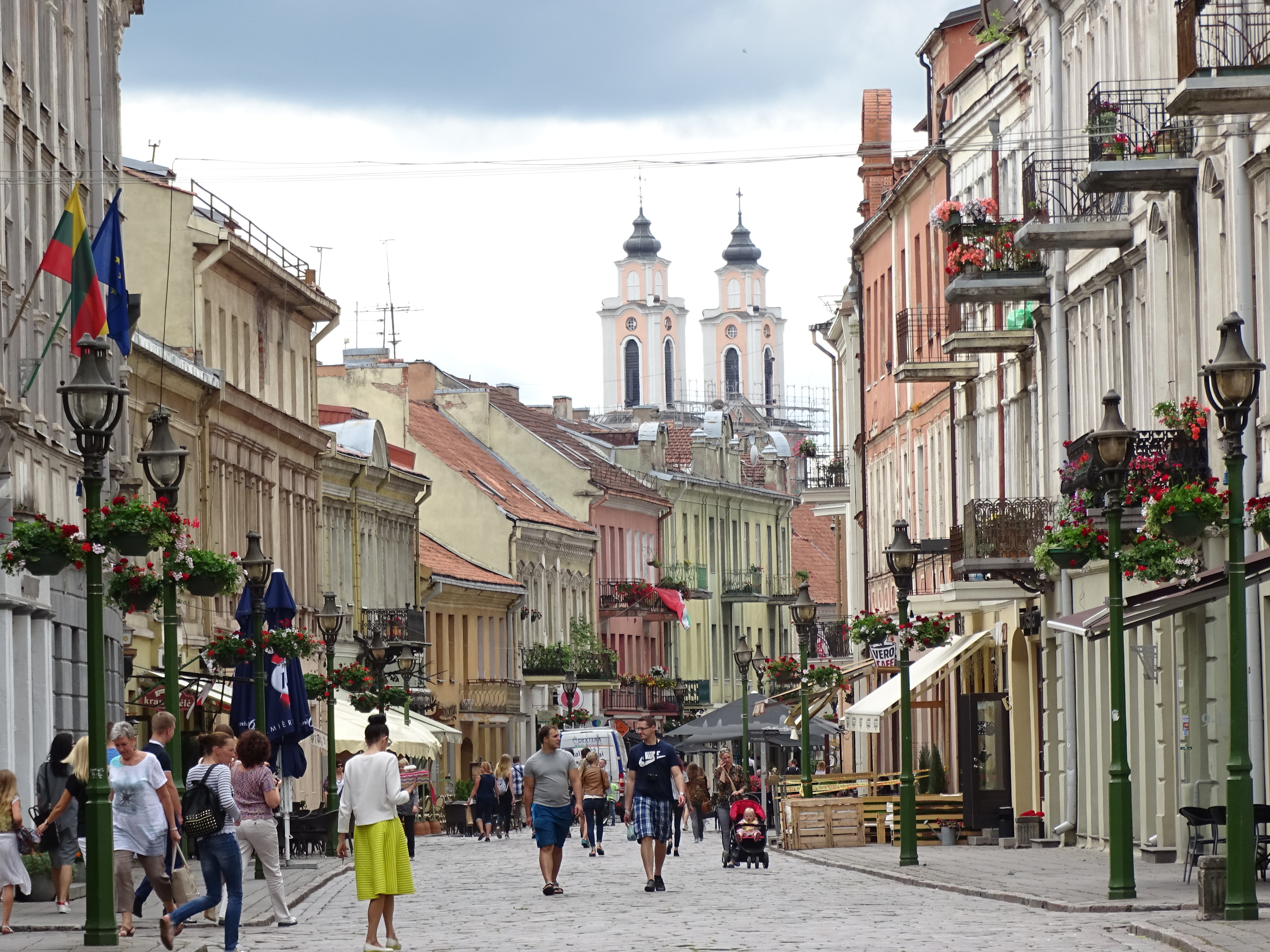
- Vilniaus Street in June 2016
- Interactive map of Vilniaus Street
- Native name: Vilniaus gatvė (Lithuanian)
- Location: Kaunas, Lithuania

Vilniaus Street (Lithuanian: Vilniaus gatvė) is a central and the oldest street in the Kaunas Old Town.

It used to part of the old road to Lithuania's capital city Vilnius, however currently it is dedicated exclusively for pedestrians, open-air cafés, etc.

Most of the buildings in the street dates to the 16th century, however some were reconstructed, and the Kaunas Cathedral Basilica was built in the early 15th century.
