= Church of St. George the Martyr, Kaunas =

Roman Catholic church in Kaunas, Lithuania

St. George the Martyr Church Kauno Šv. Jurgio Kankinio bažnyčia
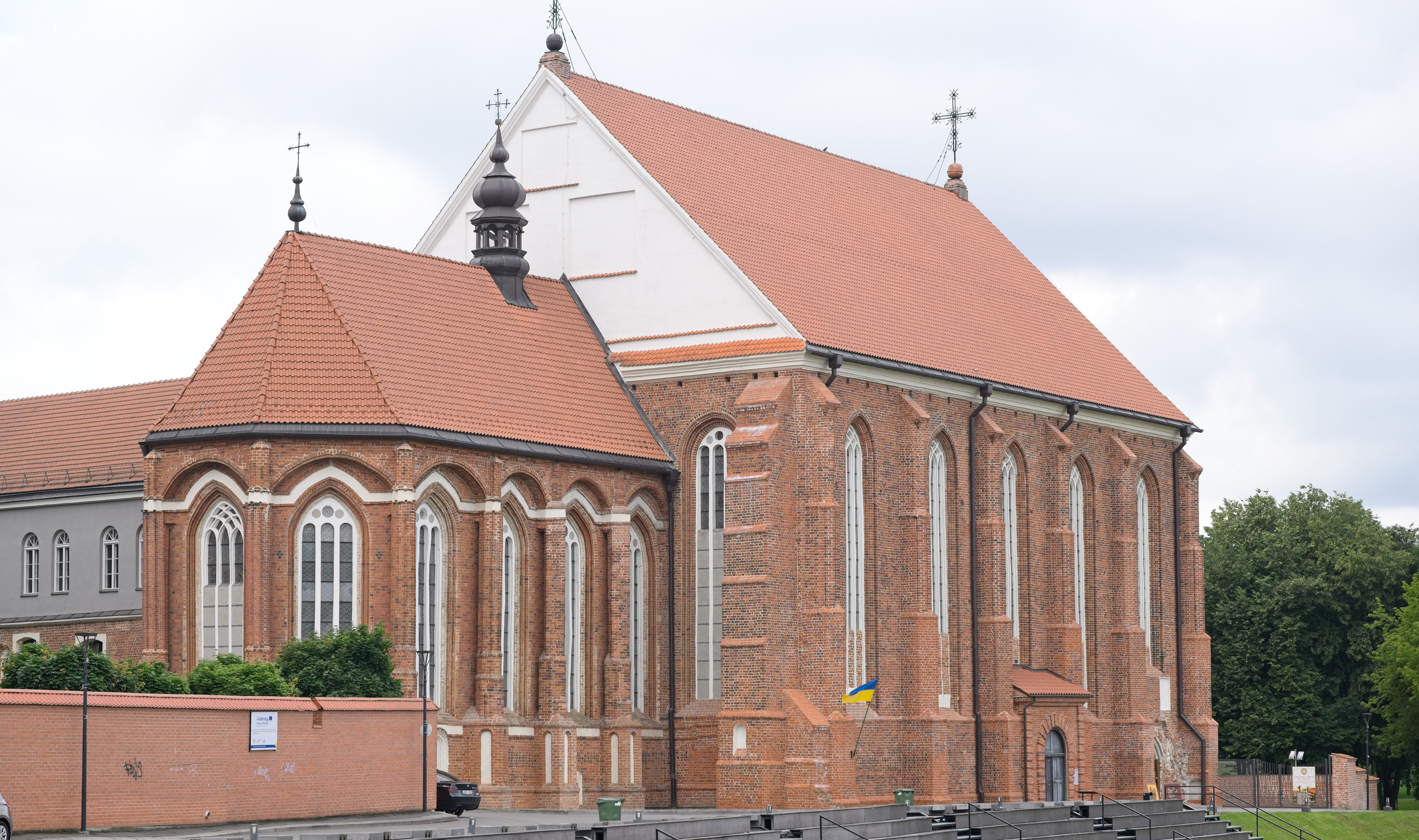
- St. George the Martyr Church

Religion
- Affiliation: Roman Catholic
- Diocese: Old Town
- Year consecrated: 1471

Location
- Location: Kaunas
- Country: Lithuania
- Interactive map of St. George the Martyr Church; Kauno Šv. Jurgio Kankinio bažnyčia
- Coordinates: 54°53′53.75″N 23°53′1.45″E

Architecture
- Type: Church
- Style: Late Gothic and Brick Gothic
- Completed: 1487
- Materials: clay bricks

Website
- Jurgine.eu

St. George the Martyr Church, Kaunas (Lithuanian: Kauno Šv. Jurgio Kankinio bažnyčia) is a Roman Catholic church in the Old Town of Kaunas, Lithuania, which stands in front of the Kaunas Castle. It is a prominent example of Gothic architecture in Lithuania.

== History ==
Its history began in 1471 when Stanislovas Sendzivojevičius, the Court Marshall of the Grand Duchy of Lithuania, donated a plot of land on the outskirts of Kaunas and Ivaška Viaževičius, the Elder of Kaunas, agreed to fund the building of a wooden church and an adjacent monastery for the Bernardine monks. Two decades later it was decided to re-build the church and the monastery in a Brick Gothic style. The construction began in 1492 and ended in 1502.

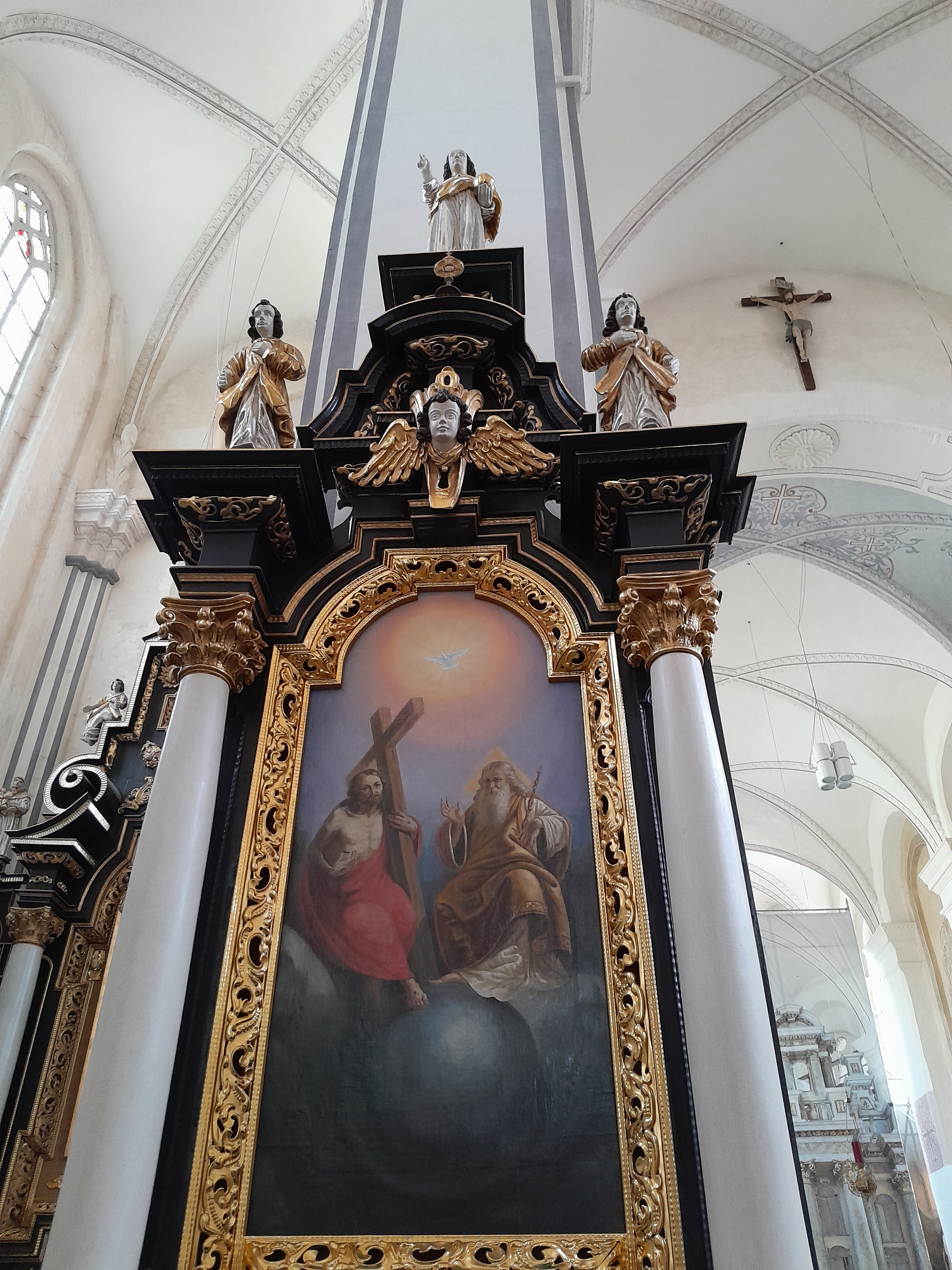
Interior

It was built roughly at the same time as the St. Anne's Church and the Bernardine churches in Vilnius and at the time of construction was second by ranking Bernardines ensemble in Lithuania after Vilnius' ensemble. All three churches were most likely built by the same famed architect from Danzig, Michael Enkinger.

The church was heavily damaged during the Napoleonic Wars and most recently during the occupation of the Baltic states when the church was converted into a medicine warehouse.
