= Lithuanian Zoo =

Zoological Garden
- Lietuvos zoologijos sodas

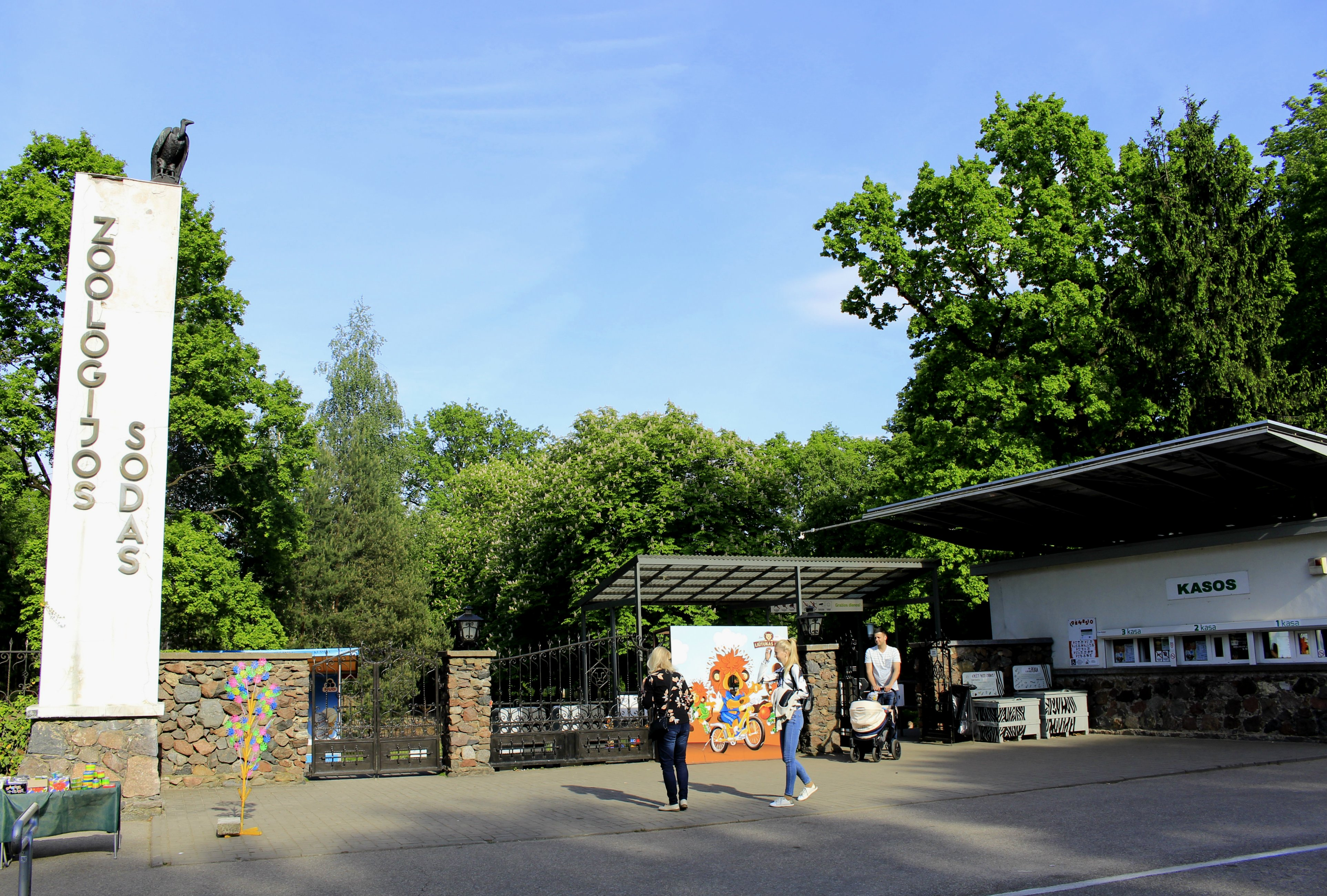
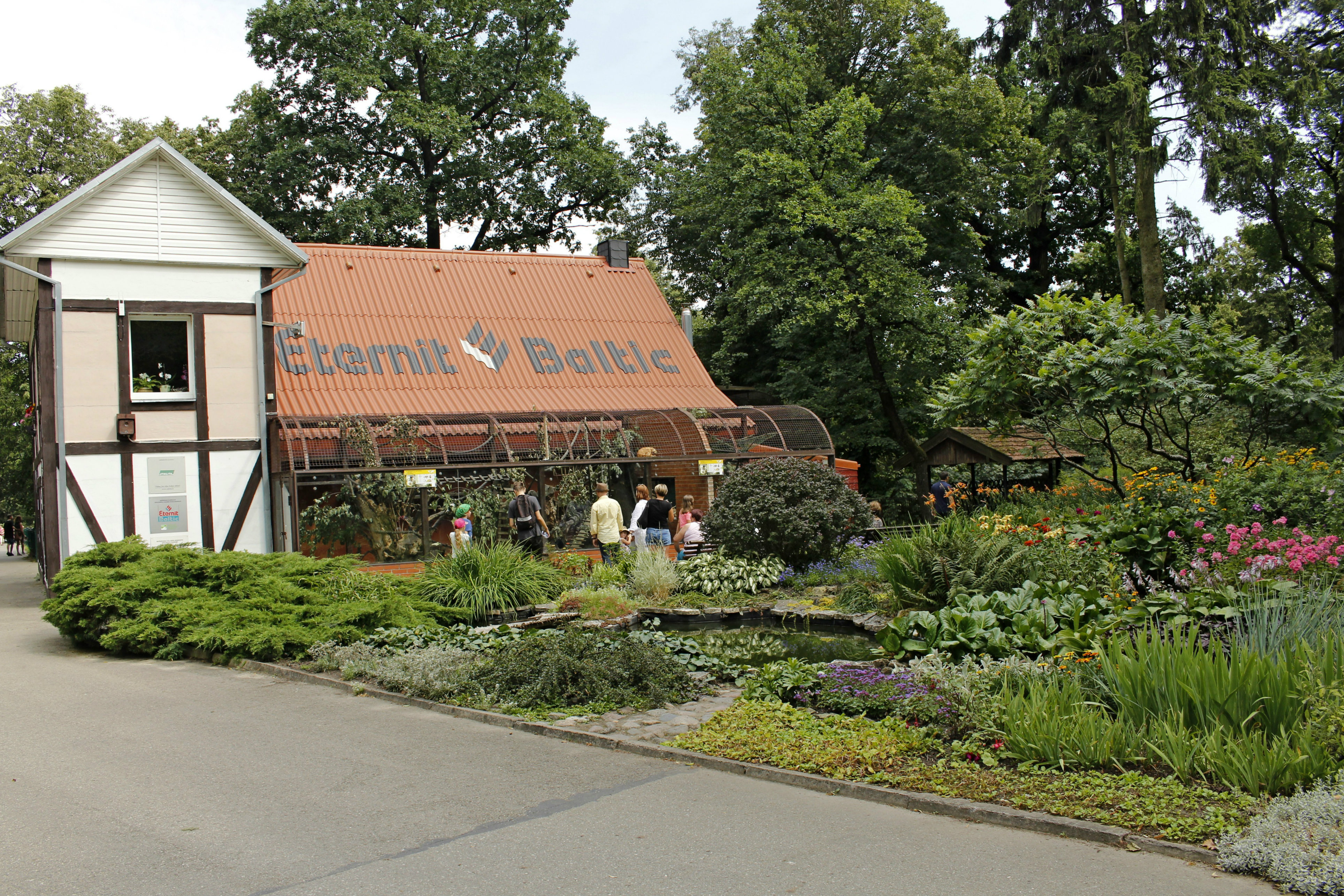
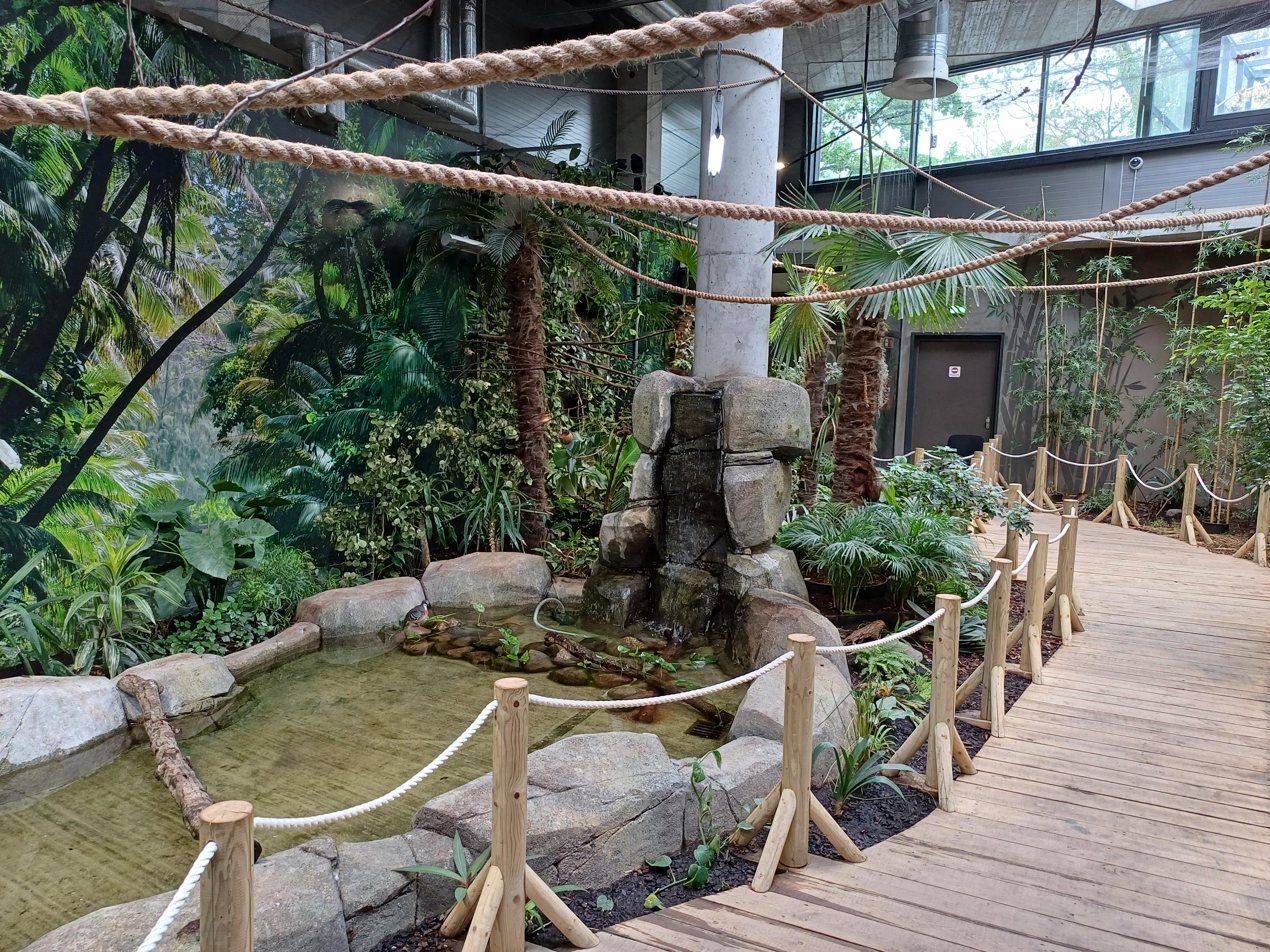
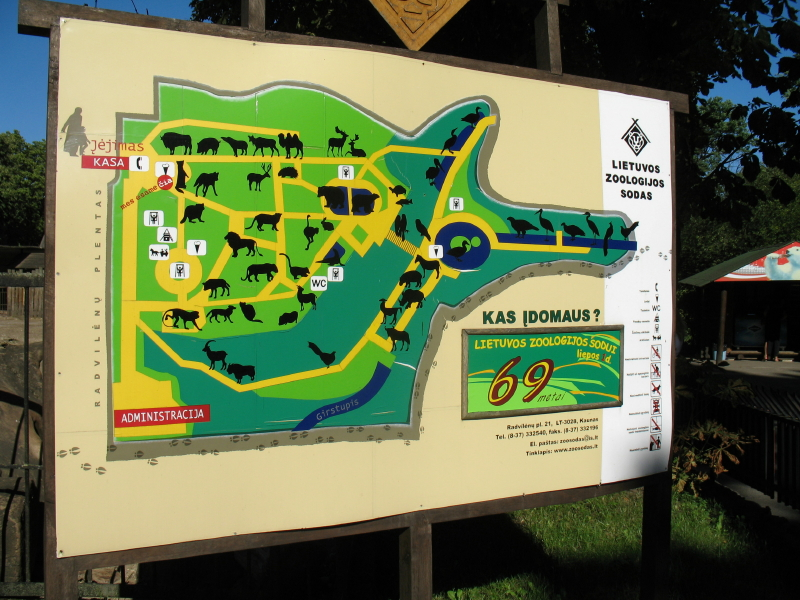
- Left to right: Zoo main gate • Invertebrates enclosure • Tropical house • Map of the zoo
- Interactive map of Zoological Garden
- 54°54′05″N 23°57′05″E
- Date opened: July 1, 1938
- Location: Kaunas, Gričiupis, Lithuania
- Land area: 15.66 ha (38.7 acres)
- No. of animals: 2166 (2017)
- No. of species: 232 (2017)
- Annual visitors: 154.350 (2016)
- Memberships: EAZA, EEP, IZE
- Major exhibits: The aquarium, The Reptile House, The Monkeys House, The Tigers corner, The Birds House
- Website: www.zoosodas.lt

Lithuanian Zoological Garden (Lithuanian: Lietuvos zoologijos sodas) previously known as Kaunas' Zoological Garden (Kauno zoologijos sodas) is the oldest scientific zoo in Lithuania. It is located in an Ąžuolynas oak grove park in the south-western Žaliakalnis elderate of Kaunas. The territory of the zoo is 15.66 hectares (38.7 acres).

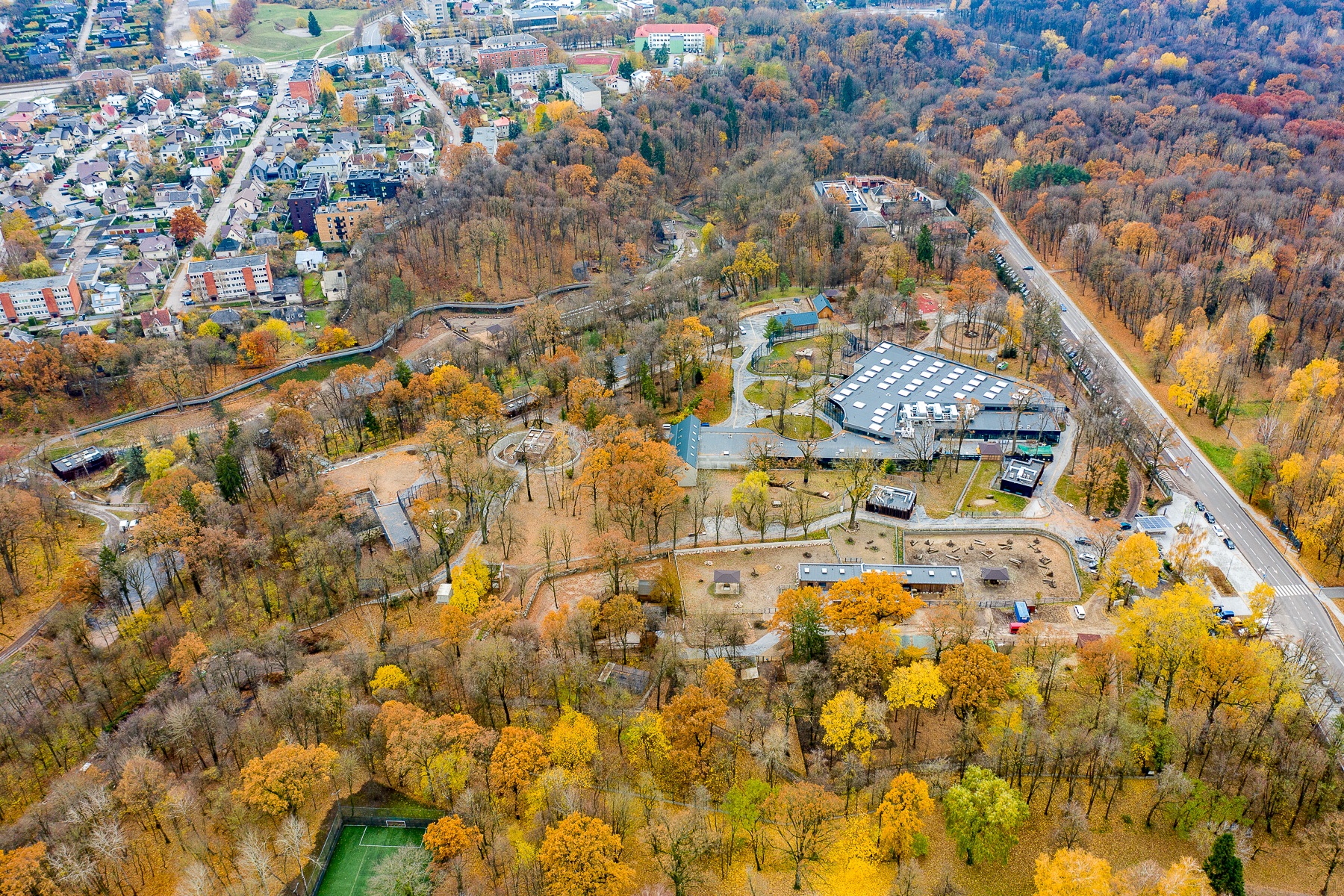
Zoo from above

The zoo was founded by the renowned Lithuanian zoologist Tadas Ivanauskas and opened on 1 July 1938 with 40 animals. His prime objective was to educate the visiting public about nature protection and to promote the conservation of endangered species. Within one year, the number of animal grew to 150. The zoo currently has 2166 animals, and is classed as a medium-size zoo according to European zoo standards. It experienced funding difficulties during the 2000s. Lithuanian zoo was renovated in 2023.
