= Church of the Blessed Sacrament, Kaunas =

Roman Catholic church in Kaunas, Lithuania

Church of the Blessed Sacrament
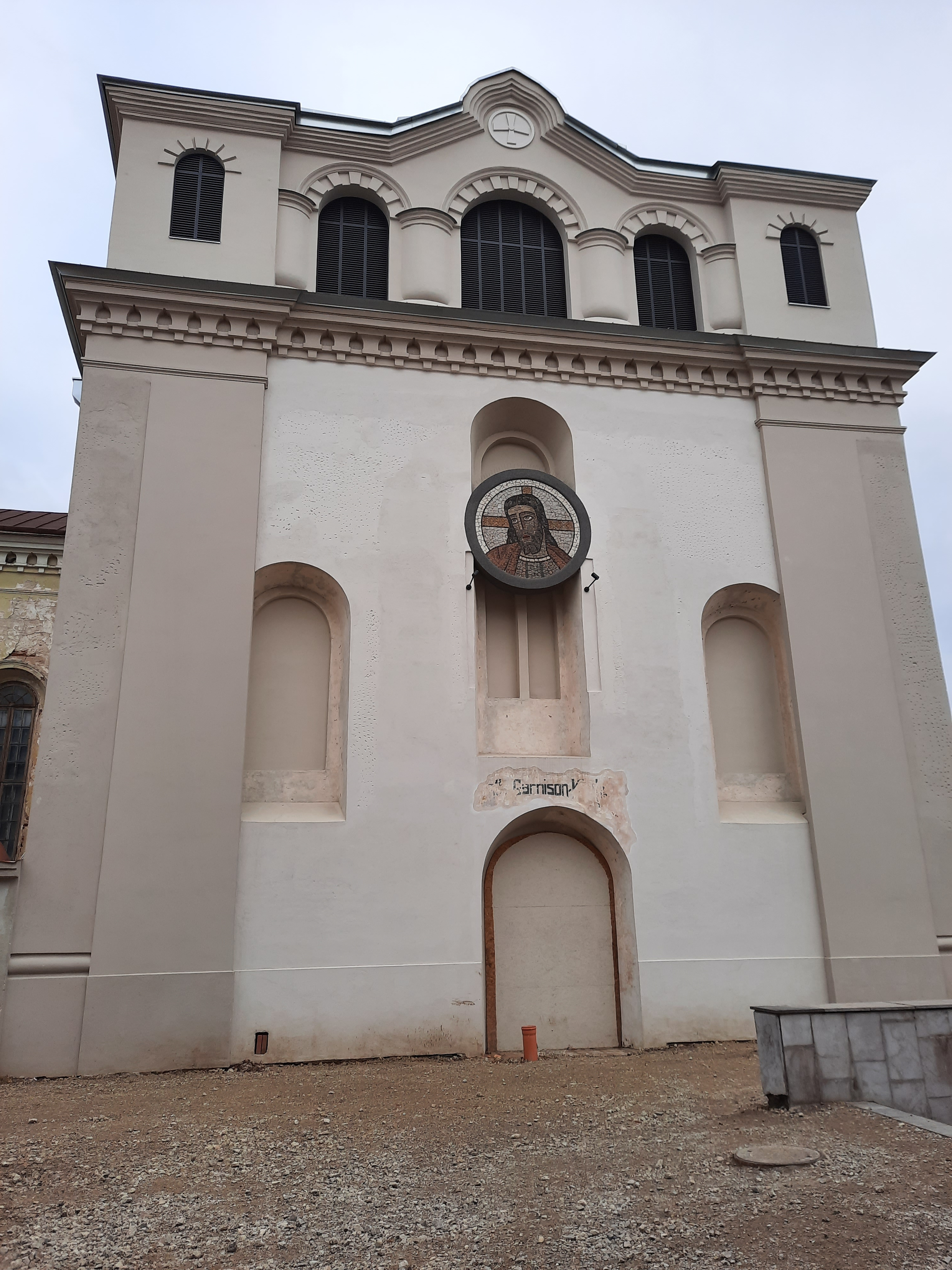
- The main façade after partial restoration

Religion
- Affiliation: Roman Catholic
- Diocese: Old Town
- Leadership: Roman Catholic Archdiocese of Kaunas

Location
- Location: Kaunas, Lithuania
- Interactive map of Church of the Blessed Sacrament
- Coordinates: 54°53′48.58″N 23°53′44.71″E

Architecture
- Type: Church
- Style: Baroque
- Completed: 1690

Specifications
- Dome: 1
- Materials: Masonry (brick)

Church of the Blessed Sacrament or Corpus Christi Church (Lithuanian: Kauno Švč. Sakramento bažnyčia or Kauno Dievo kūno bažnyčia) is a Roman Catholic church in the Old Town of Kaunas, Lithuania.

== History ==
In the first half of the 17th century the Dominican Order monks arrived in Kaunas and in 1641 Lithuanian Grand Duke Władysław IV Vasa granted a permission for them to build the Church of the Blessed Sacrament and the Dominican Monastery, both of which were completed in the late 17th century.

The church was damaged by the Napoleonic Army in 1812 and together with the Dominican Monastery was closed in 1845 by the order of Russian tsar Nicholas I of Russia, in 1865 it was converted into an Orthodox church.

In the 20th century the church was returned to Catholics during the interwar period, however after the Soviet occupation of Lithuania the church was converted into a movie theatre and once again damaged, but in the 2020s its restoration works were started.

== Gallery ==
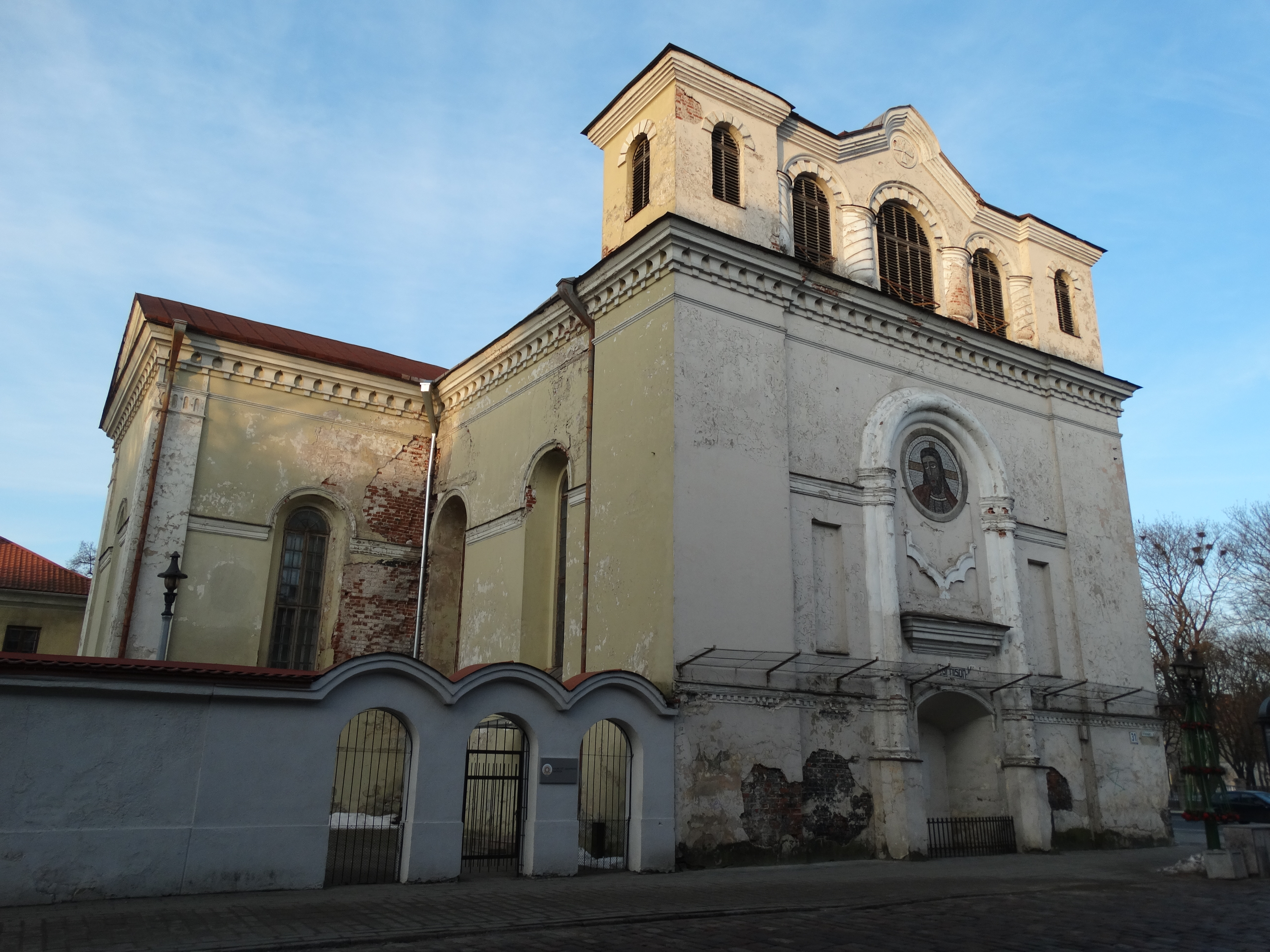
Main façade

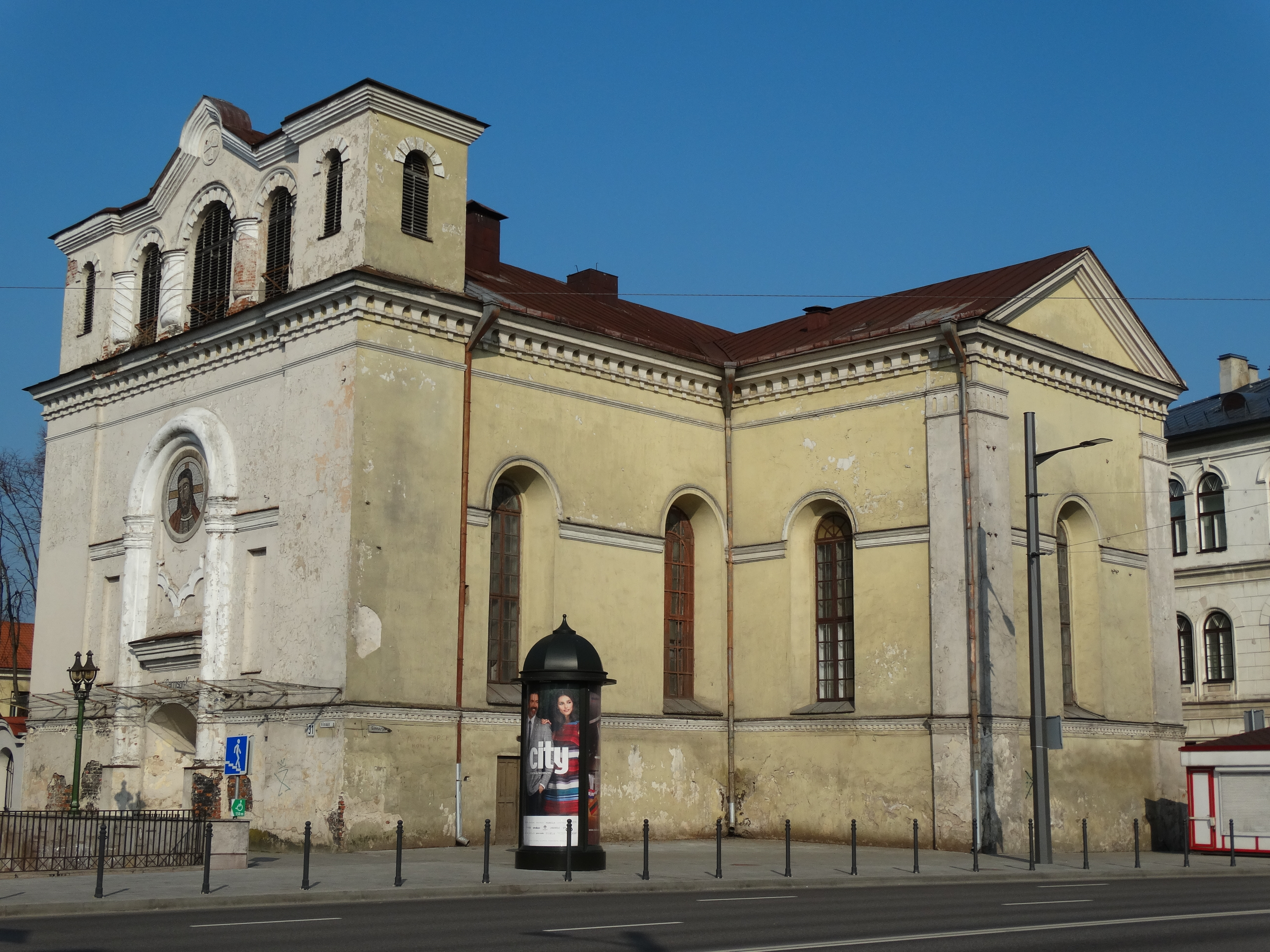
Side view

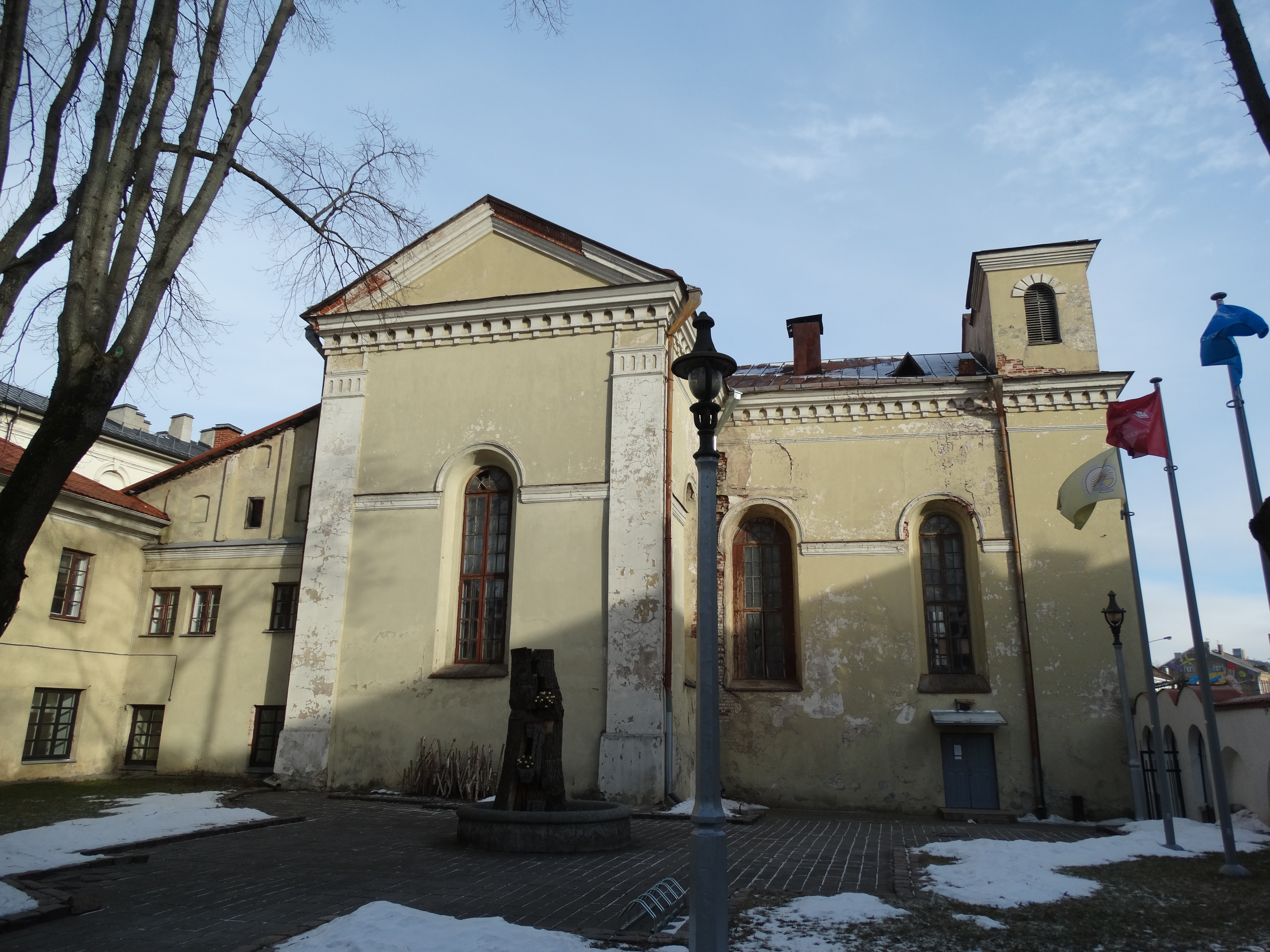
Side view

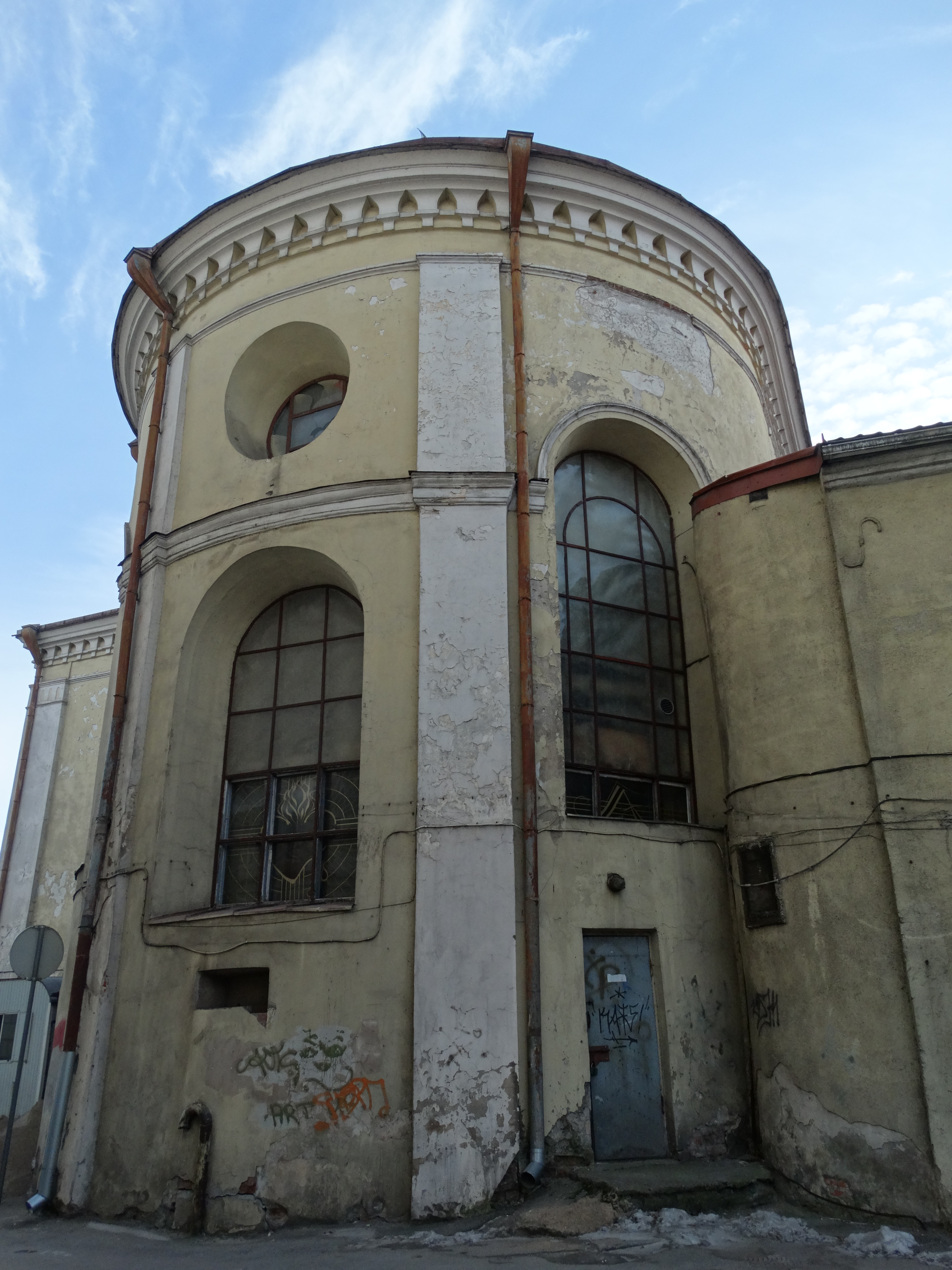
Apse

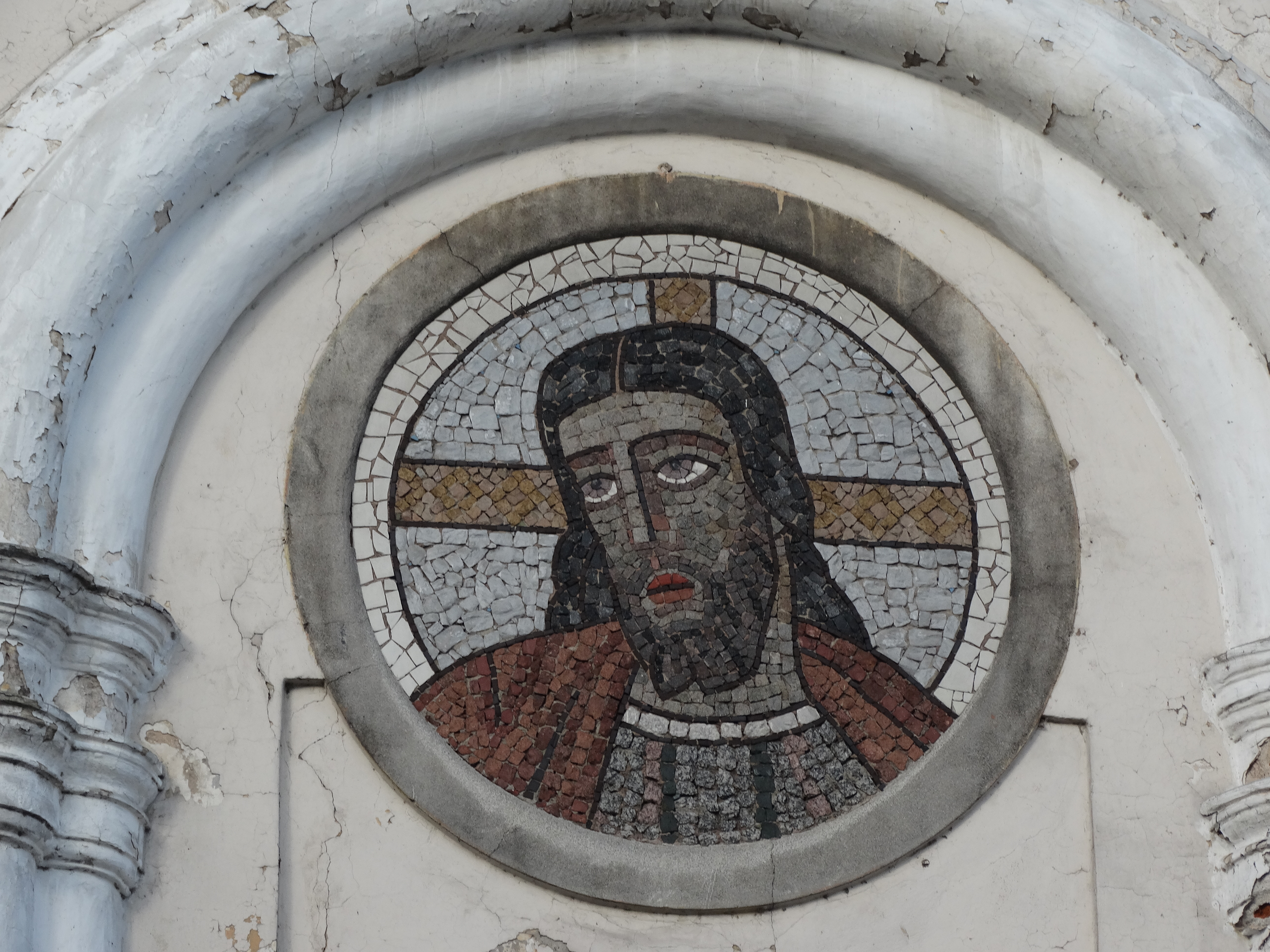
Mosaic

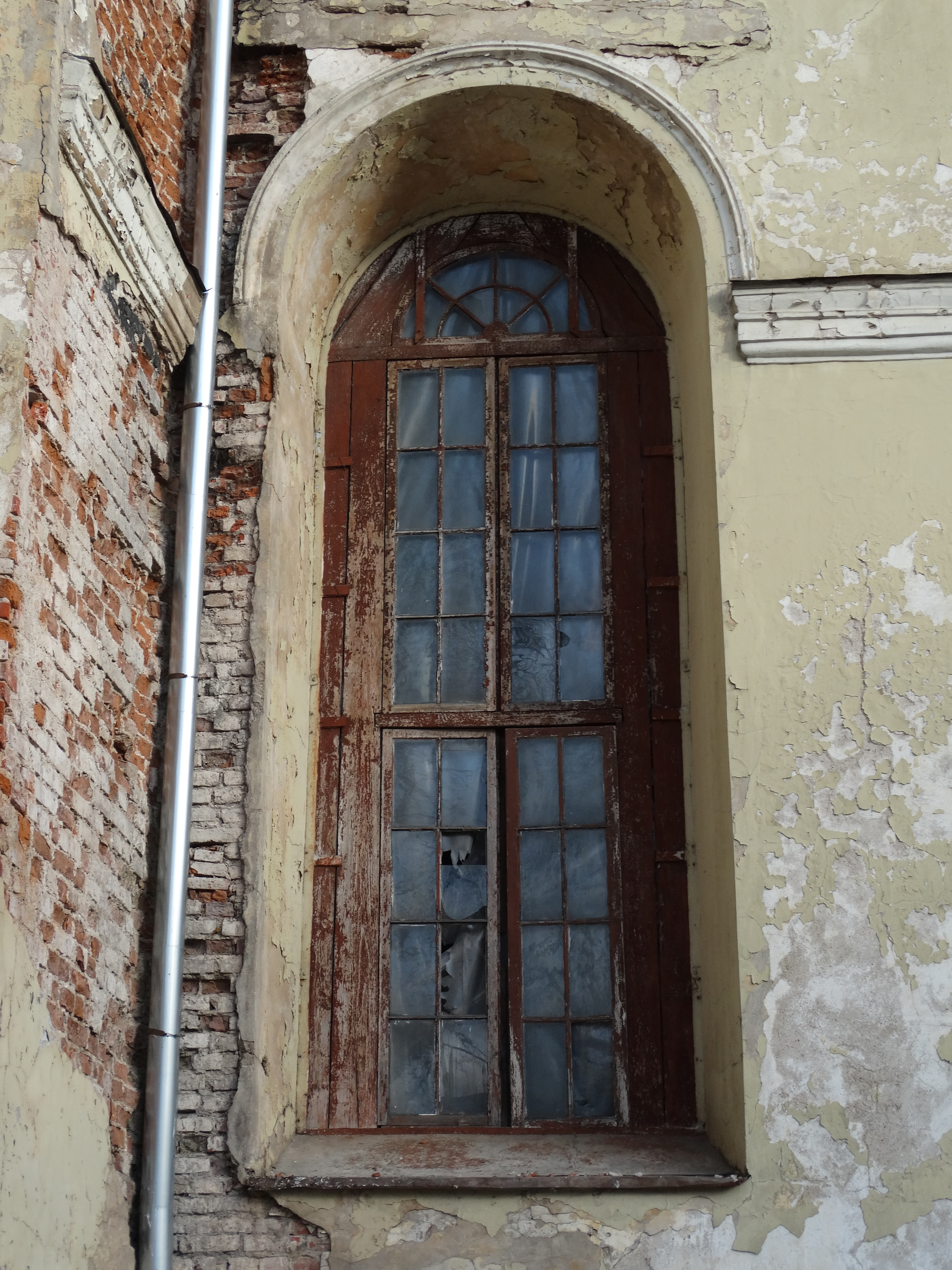
Window

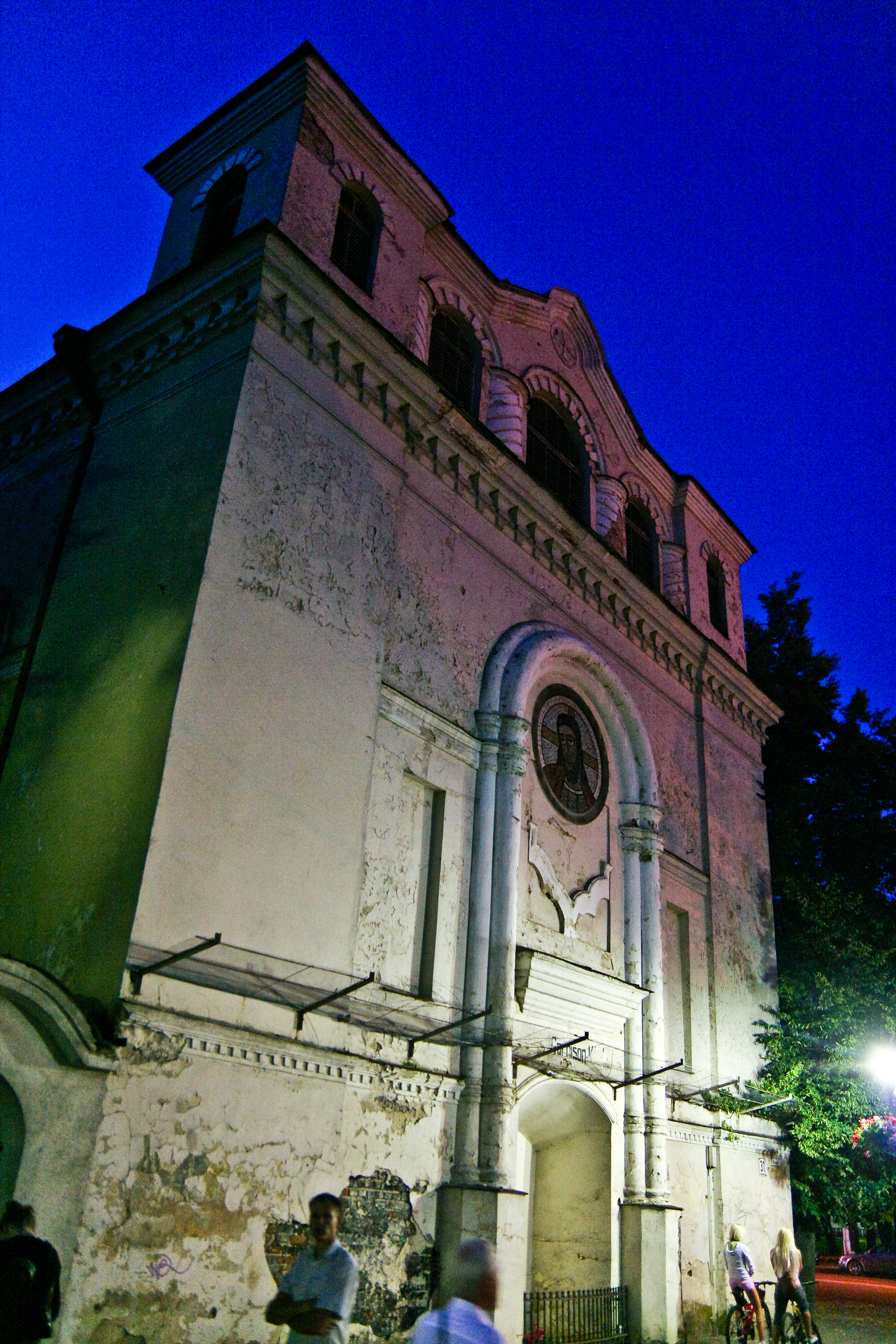
At night

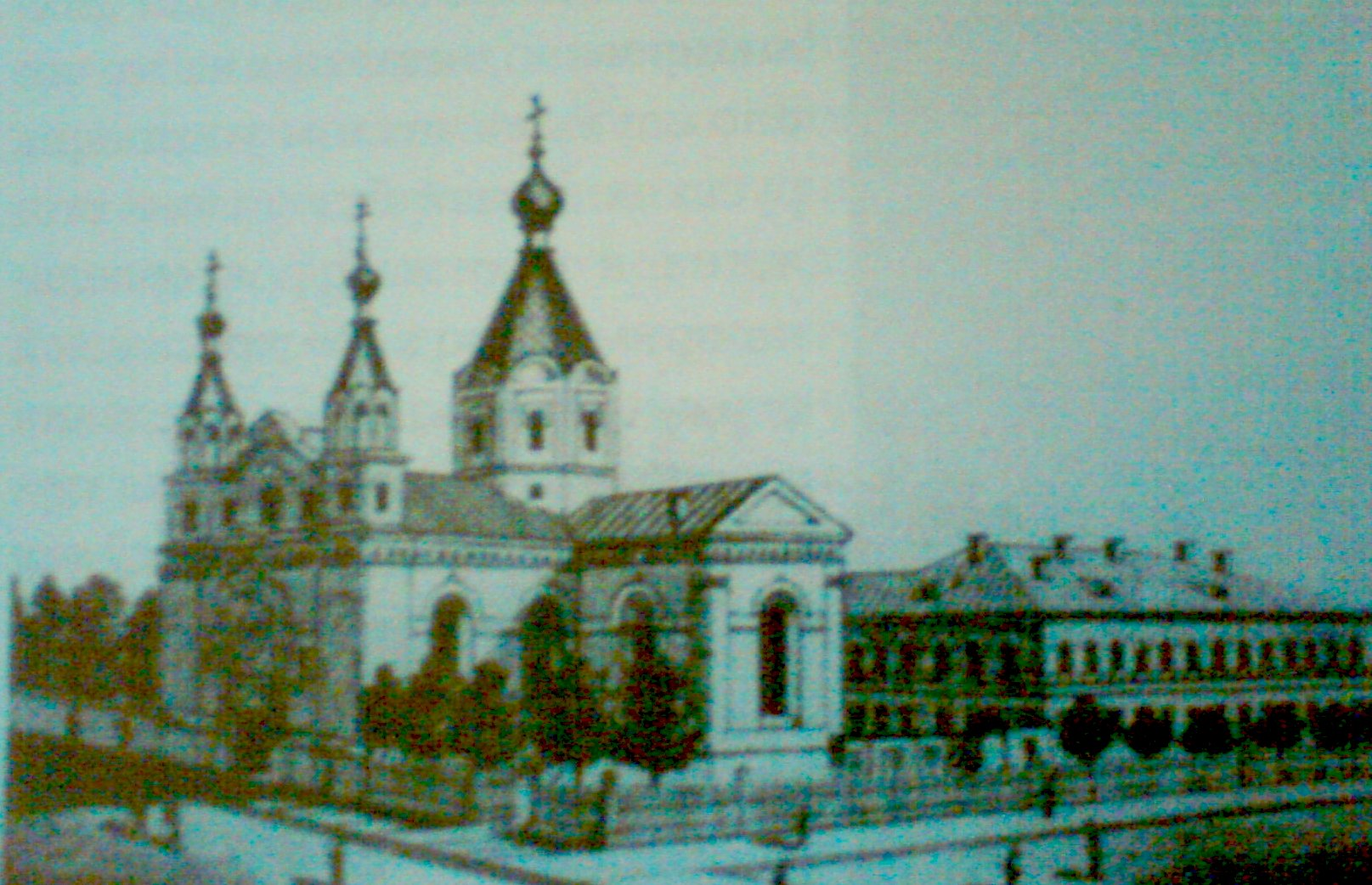
Before 1919
