= Church of St. Gertrude, Kaunas =

Church building in Kaunas, Lithuania

St. Gertrude's Church Šv. Gertrūdos bažnyčia
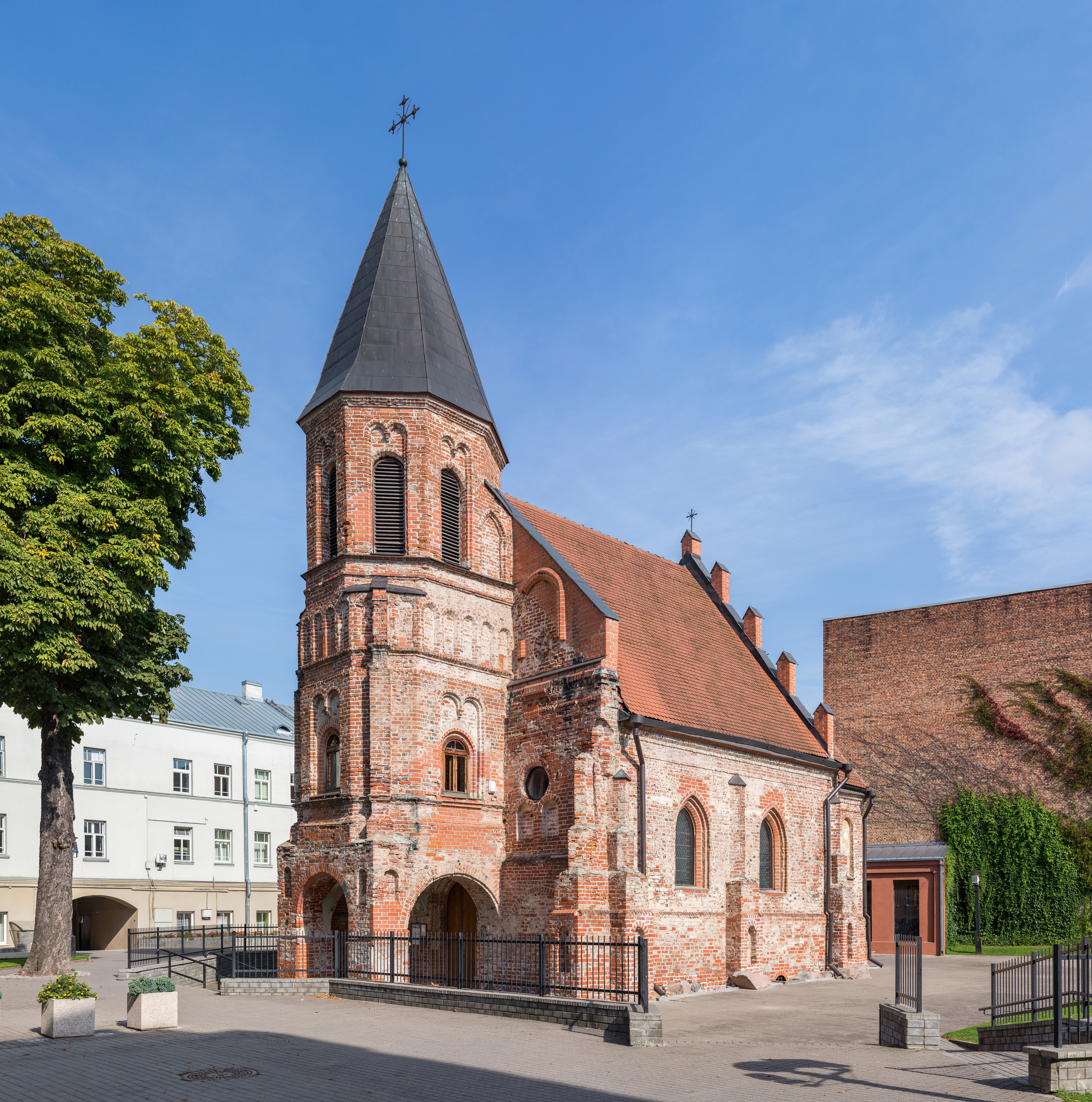
- Kaunas Church of St. Gertrude

Religion
- Affiliation: Roman Catholic
- Diocese: Old Town, Kaunas
- Year consecrated: 16th century

Location
- Location: Kaunas, Lithuania
- Interactive map of St. Gertrude's Church; Šv. Gertrūdos bažnyčia
- Coordinates: 54°53′50″N 23°54′05″E

Architecture
- Type: Church
- Style: Late Gothic and Brick Gothic
- Completed: Late 15th century or early 16th century

Specifications
- Direction of façade: East
- Materials: clay bricks

The Church of St. Gertrude (Lithuanian: Šv. Gertrūdos bažnyčia) is in the Old Town of Kaunas, Lithuania. It was built in the late 15th century or early 16th century.
