= Gričiupis =

Coordinates: 54°54′13″N 23°57′46″E

Girčiupis
- Eldership
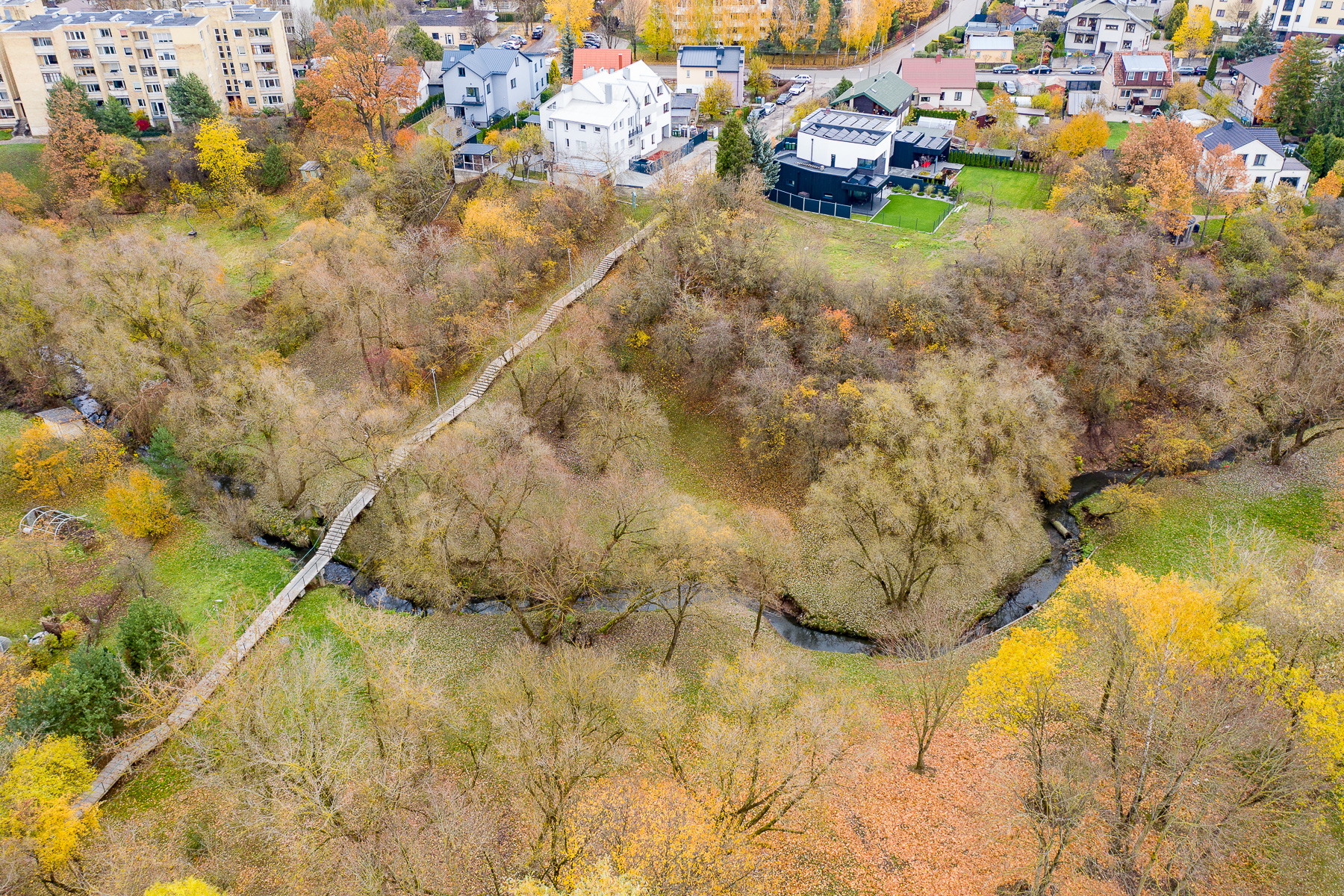
- Girčiupis river

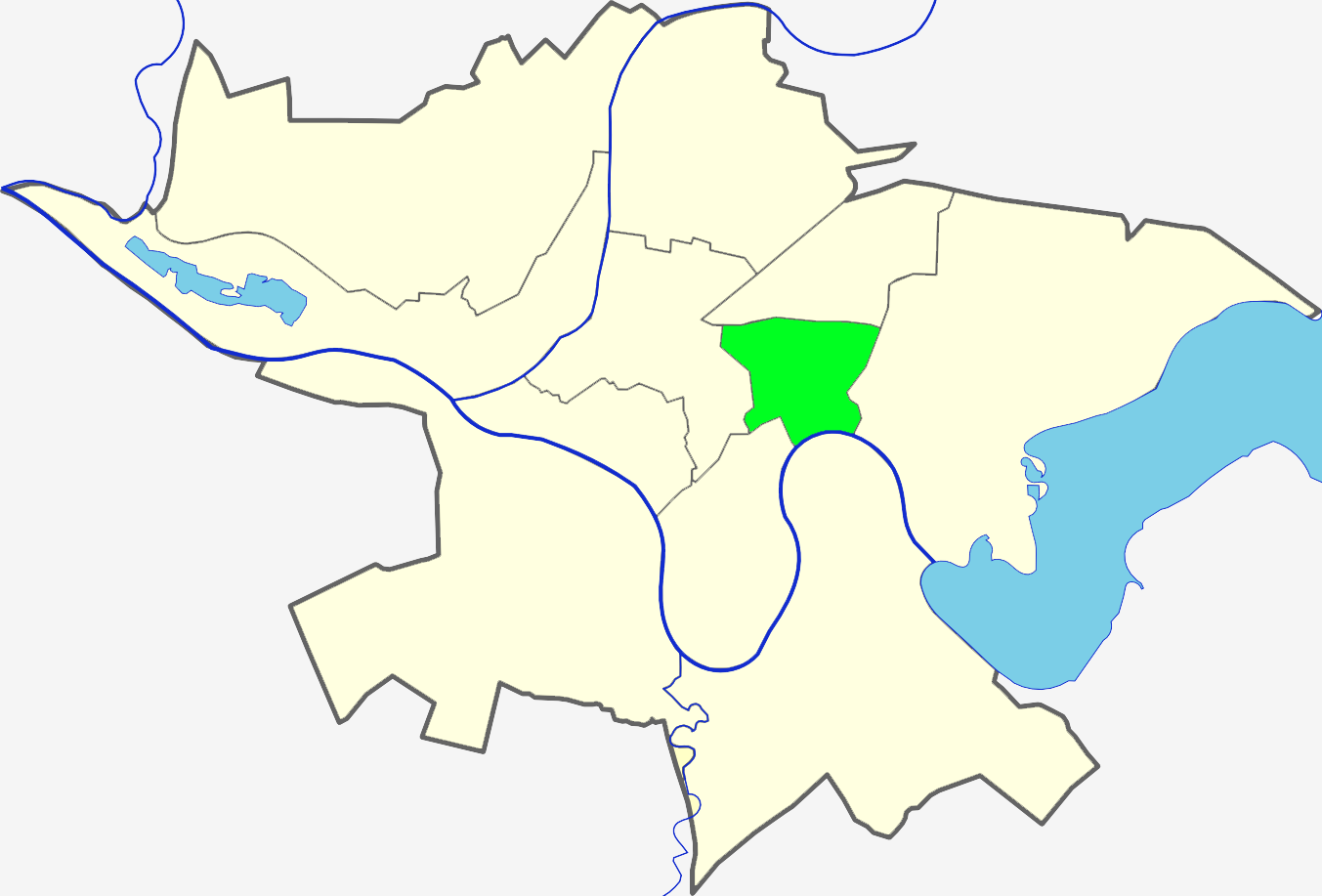
- Location of Gričiupis within Kaunas
- Country: Lithuania
- County: Kaunas County
- Municipality: Kaunas city municipality

Area
  - Total: 3.8 km^{2} (1.5 sq mi)

Population (2021)
  - Total: 23,894
  - Density: 6,300/km^{2} (16,000/sq mi)
- Time zone: UTC+2 (EET)
  - Summer (DST): UTC+3 (EEST)

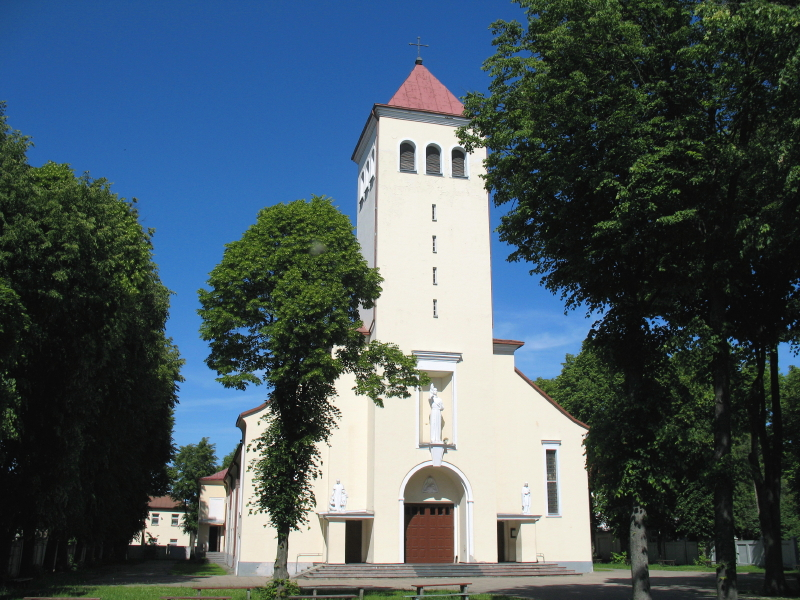
St. Anthony church in Gričiupis elderate

Gričiupis is a neighborhood of the Lithuanian city of Kaunas, located on the right bank of the Nemunas River. It has elderate status, and is the smallest elderate in the city. Its administrative status as an elderate was established in 2005, when it was detached from Dainava elderate. In 2021 its population was 23,894 in an area of 3.81 square kilometers.

The elderate of Gričiupis contains an old Jewish cemetery, Lithuanian Zoo, many faculties of Kaunas University of Technology, 6th Fort of Kaunas Fortress, and St. Anthony of Padova Church.
