= Dainava (Kaunas) =

Coordinates: 54°55′15″N 23°58′24″E

- Eldership
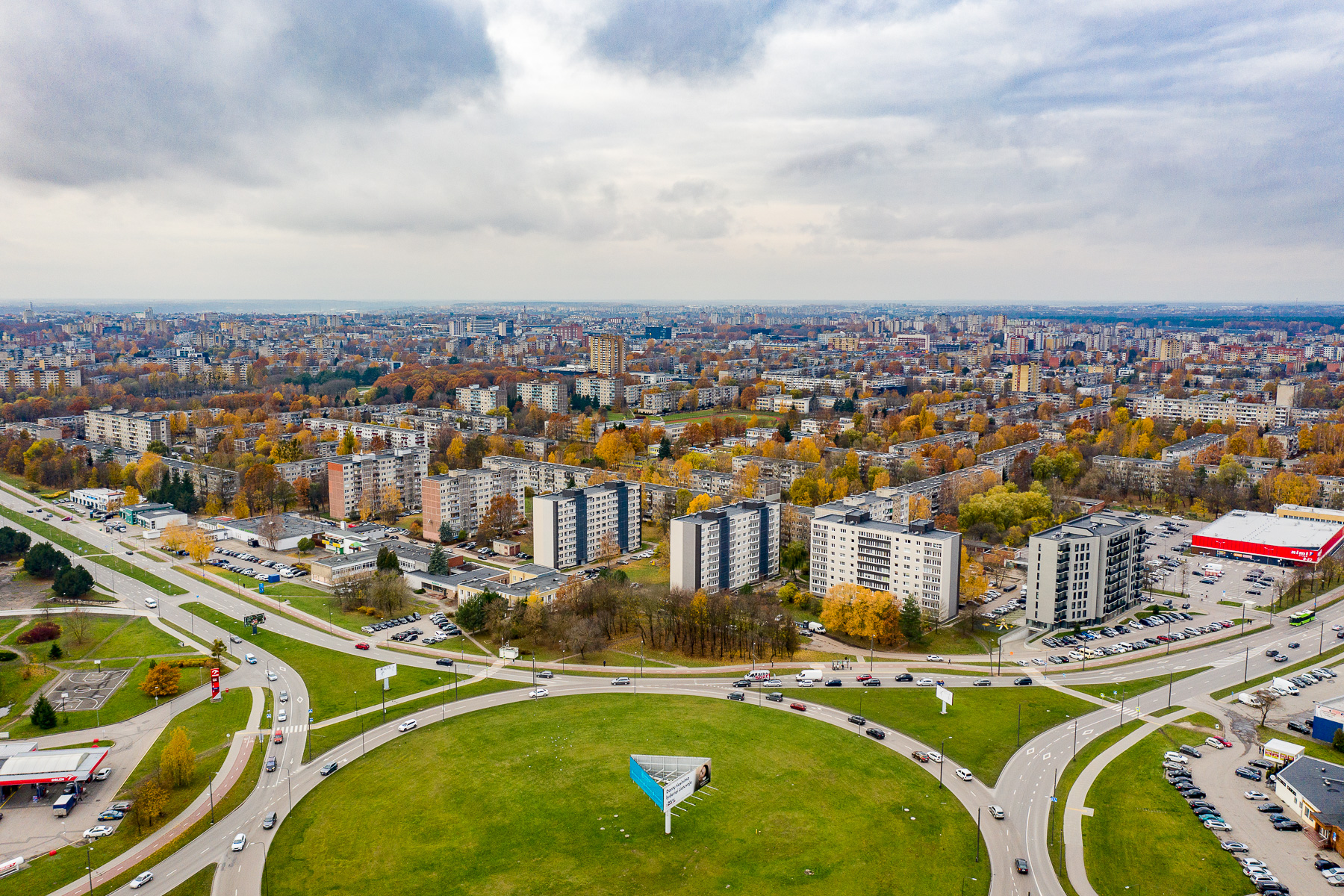
- Dainava in 2023

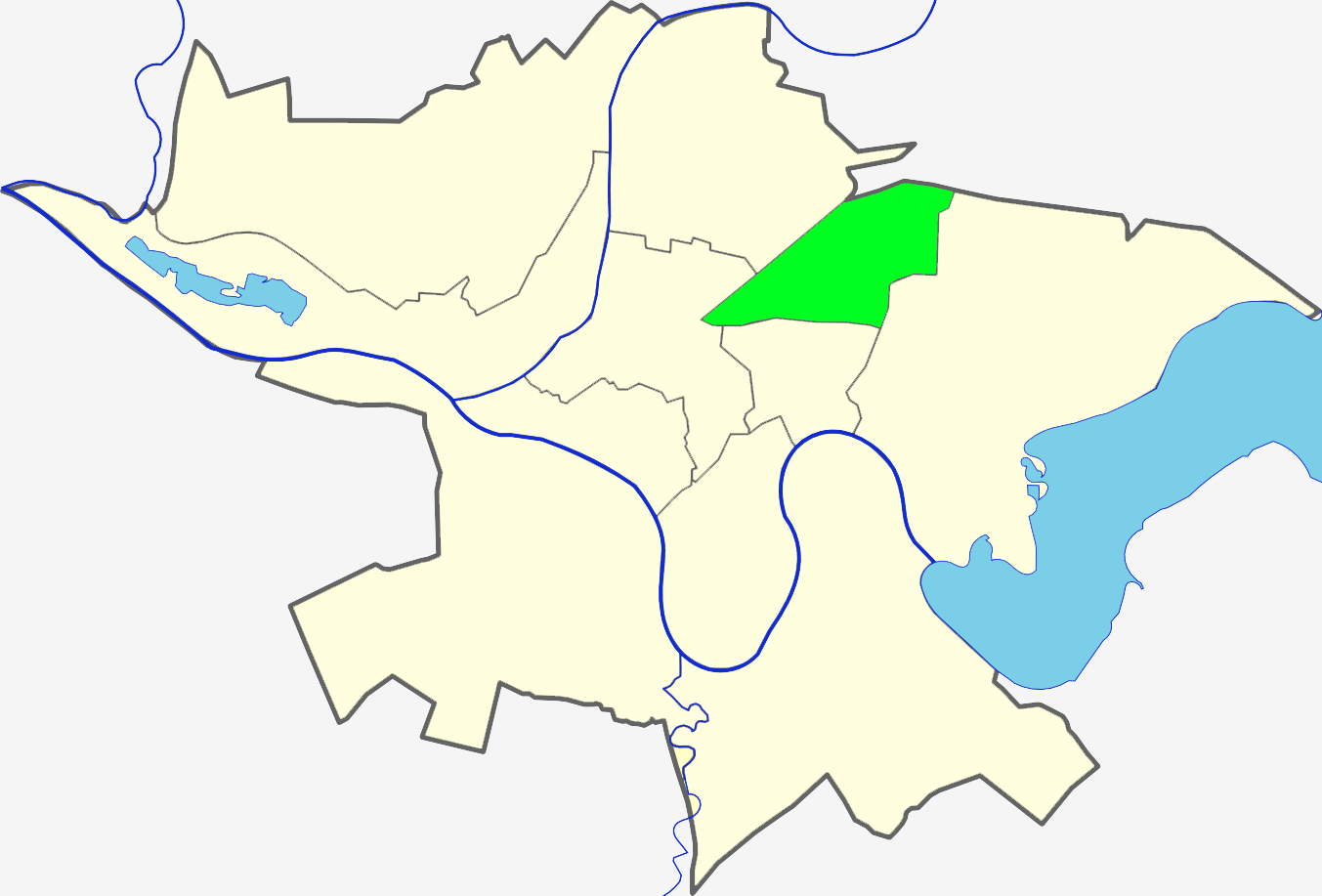
- Location of Dainava within Kaunas
- Country: Lithuania
- County: Kaunas County
- Municipality: Kaunas city municipality

Area
  - Total: 5.28 km^{2} (2.04 sq mi)

Population (2021)
  - Total: 53,000
  - Density: 10,000/km^{2} (26,000/sq mi)
- Time zone: UTC+2 (EET)
  - Summer (DST): UTC+3 (EEST)

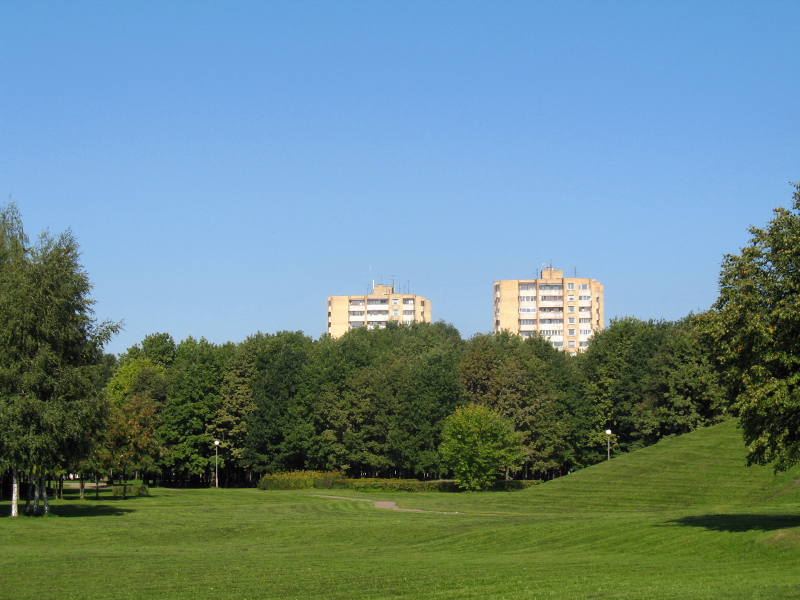
Park of Friendship in Dainava neighbourhood (2006)

Dainava is a neighbourhood built in 1963, initially as a microdistrict, located in the north-northeast part of the second largest Lithuanian city of Kaunas.

It has an elderate status. Before 2005 it included the Gričiupis section (dalys), split into a separate elderate. The borough borders Highway A1, and Kaunas Free Economic Zone in the north, Petrašiūnai borough in the east, Gričiupis elderate in the south as well as Žaliakalnis and Eiguliai elderate s in the west.

Known for parks, most of them renovated since the late 2010s, a dense network of public transport, and many trolleybus lines cross the neighborhood. The largest park is Park of Friendship (Lithuanian: Draugystės parkas) completed in 1973. The neighbourhood was built in a typical soviet fashion. It is one of the largest elderates by population in Kaunas with over 70,000 inhabitants as of 2006 despite its small area of only 7.28 square kilometres (2.81 sq mi).
