= Kaunas Free Economic Zone =

Coordinates: 54°56′23″N 24°00′41″E

- Type: UAB
- Industry: Tax free zone. Logistics, warehouse, manufacturing, industry
- Founded: 1996 m.
- Headquarters: Inovacijų str. 3, Biruliškės, LT-54469, Kaunas region, Lithuania
- Key people: Vytautas Petružis
- Owner: Kauno laisvosios ekonominės zonos valdymo UAB
- Website: www.ftz.lt

The Kaunas Free Economic Zone (FEZ) or Kaunas FEZ (Lithuanian: Kauno laisvoji ekonominė zona) is a free economic zone near Kaunas, Lithuania. It is a 534 hectare industrial development area which offers favorable and smaller taxes for production or logistics companies which invest at least 1 million euros or service companies which invest more than 100 thousand euros and employ over 20 people. The investors are mostly foreign companies, as more than 70% of total investments in Kaunas FEZ are foreign direct investments (FDI).

The Kaunas Free Economic zone was established on 22 October 1996 in Kaunas district, near the motorways A6 and A1.

== Areas ==
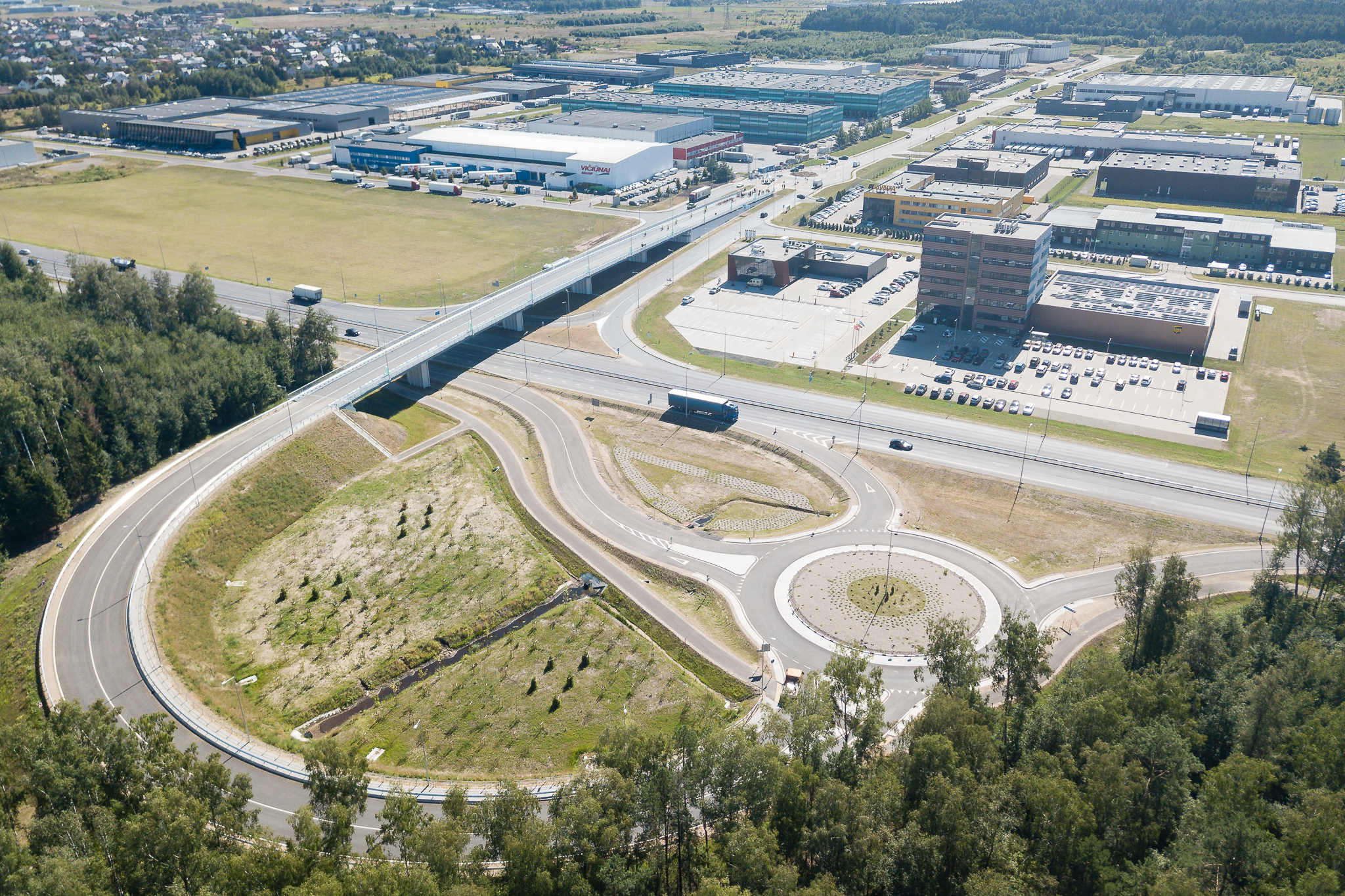
Kaunas Free Economic Zone

Area of Kaunas FEZ has three parts: Production and Logistics Area, Business Street and Airpark.

The Productions and Logistics Area is the largest territory of Kaunas FEZ parts. Investments for the green field take the biggest part of this territory.

The Production and Logistics area is used by logistics terminals, pharmaceutical companies, foam Production Company with Finnish origins and high technology industry Automation Company.

The Business Street is a part dedicated for future business centres within the Kaunas FEZ at Road A6. It is planned to build 13 different land plots for offices and hotels. Most of these land plots have detailed plans and modern infrastructure. This territory is going to have the easy access, well-situated parking system and well-developed office premises.

The third and the last part of Kaunas FEZ is The Airpark. The territory has nearly 3-kilometer-long border with the territory of Kaunas Airport enabling direct access to aircraft and eliminating custom clearance procedures. The Airpark territory has three different road types inside: air, car and railway roads. Airline depots, various aviation industries such as testing, sales and aircraft assembly or aircraft service companies can easily establish themselves inside the FEZ and use runway, tax incentives or other offered privileges.

== FEZ companies ==
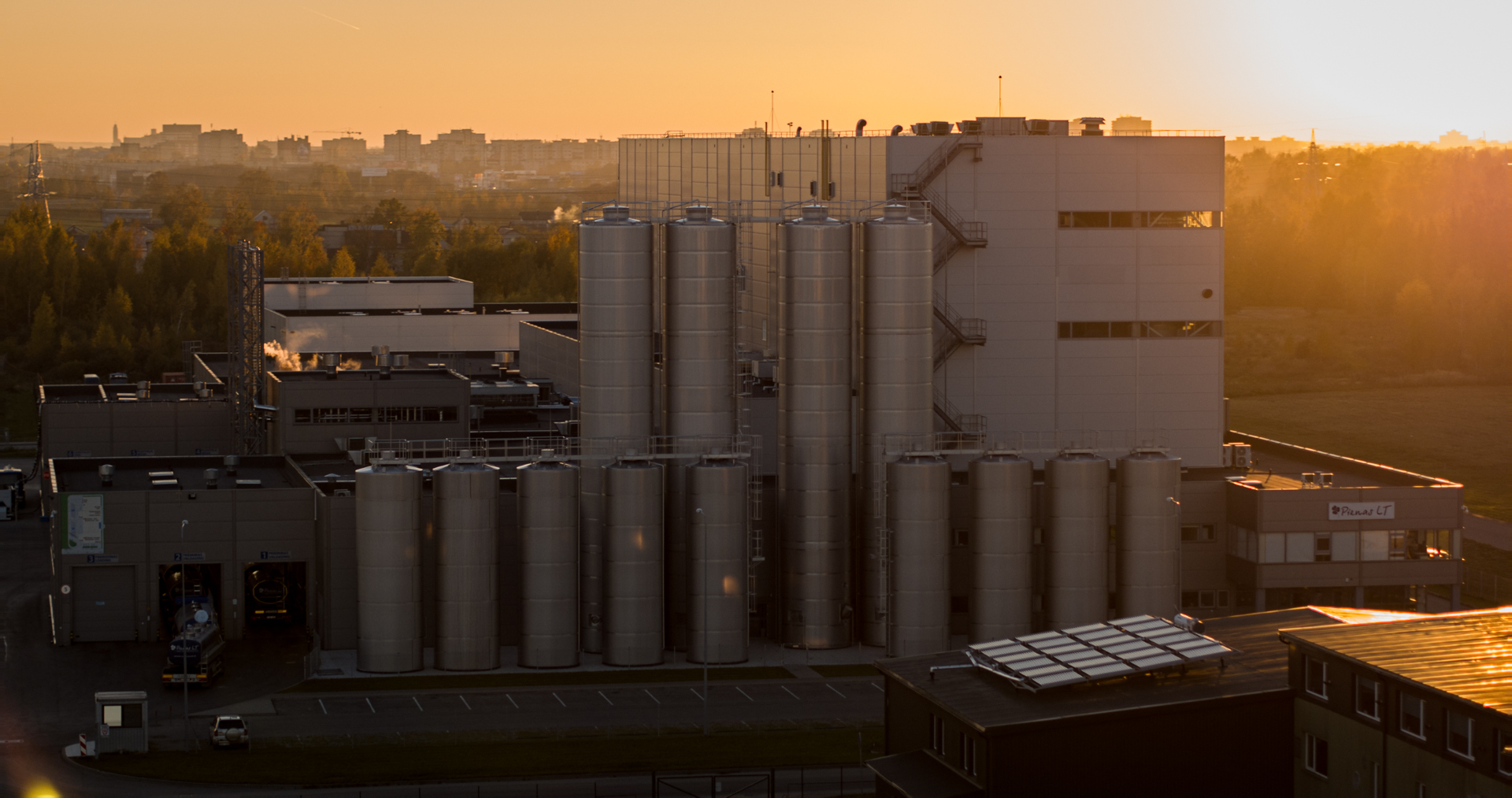
Pienas LT

In 2005 the first client invested in Kaunas FEZ. Up until 2019 Kaunas FEZ has already attracted 24 investors. In general, companies established in Kaunas FEZ have already created more than 5500 jobs.

38 companies already operating in Kaunas FEZ or signed contracts regarding the establishment in it including: Aconitum, Interchemie werken "De Adelaar" LT, Fitsout, Freda, Kamė, Pienas LT, Vičiūnai Group, Continental AG, Hella KGaA Hueck & Co., Hollister Inc., Elinta, Axioma Metering, Chemsys, Run Engineering, Littec, Kauno Kogeneracinė Jėgainė, Finnfoam, Peraltis, Ryterna, Kopa, FL Technics, Eften Capital, Lavisos LEZ terminalas, Aibė, ABC Farma, Rees LEZ, Vytėnų projektai, Novecorum, DPD Lietuva, UPS, Grill London, MTTC.

== Tax incentives ==
Tax	General	In LEZ
Corporation tax	15%	0% (first 6 years) 7.5% (following 10 years)
Property tax	1%	0%
Dividends tax (for foreign investors)	15%	0%
