= Kaunas Old Town =

Neighbourhood in Kaunas, Lithuania

- Neighborhoods of Kaunas
- Kauno Senamiestis
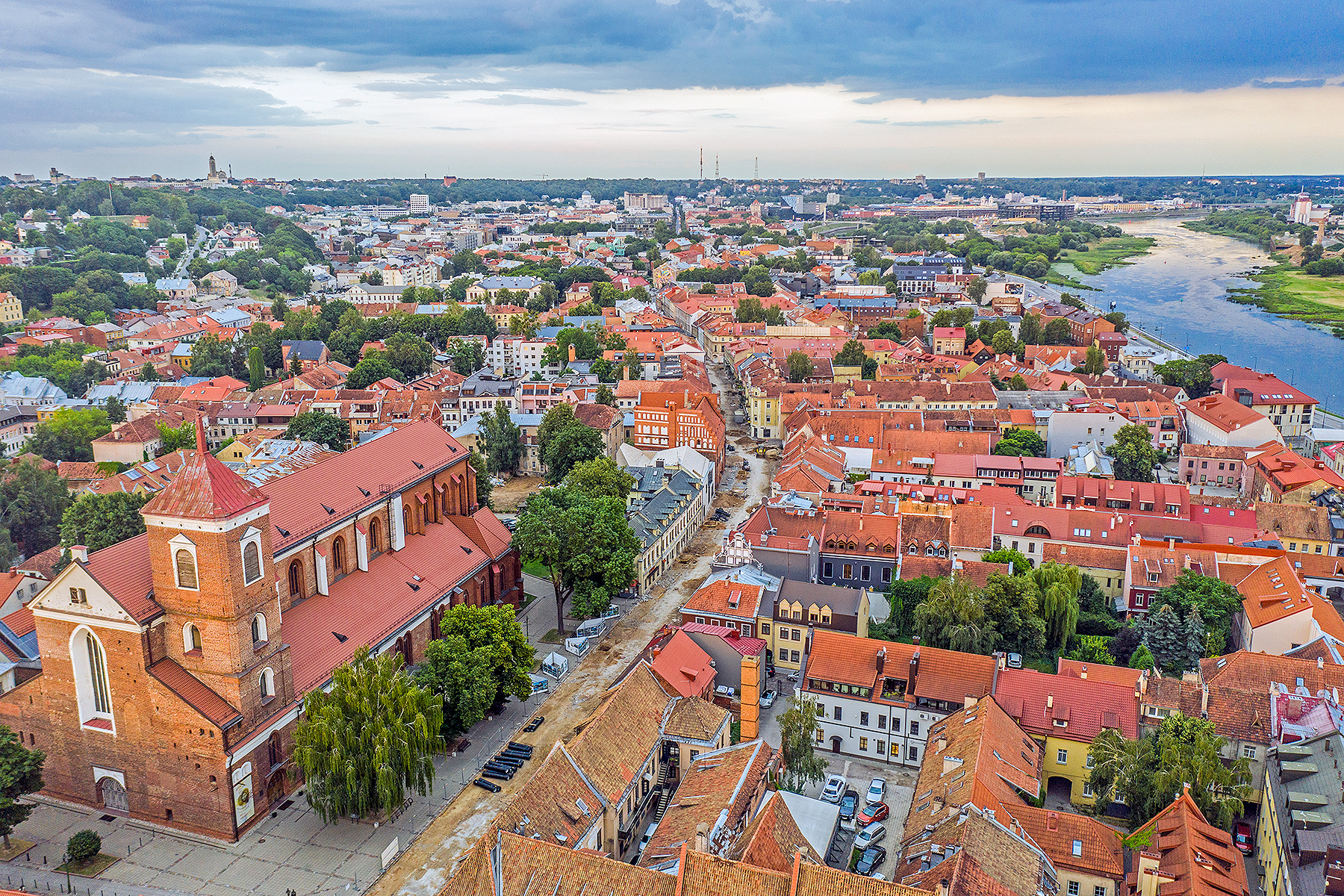
- Drone view of the Old Town
- Interactive map of Kaunas Old Town
- Coordinates: 54°53′48″N 23°53′28″E
- Country: Lithuania
- Time zone: UTC+1 (CET)
  - Summer (DST): UTC+2 (CEST)

Kaunas Old Town is the oldest part of Kaunas, next to the confluence of the Nemunas and Neris rivers and Santaka Park. The Old Town had industry in the past, but it is primarily a residential, retail and leisure area in the 21st century.

The main street of the Old Town is cobbled Vilniaus Street, which runs from Kaunas Town Hall to Laisvės Avenue. Laisvės Avenue is one of the longest pedestrian streets in Europe.

== Landmarks ==
There are several landmarks in Kaunas old town, most notably:

- House of Perkūnas
- Town Hall, Kaunas
- Kaunas Castle
- Church of St. Francis Xavier, Kaunas
- Church of St. George the Martyr, Kaunas
- House of Basketball
- Church of St. Gertrude, Kaunas
- Church of the Blessed Sacrament, Kaunas
- Church of Vytautas the Great
- Kaunas Cathedral Basilica
- Old Kaunas Ducal Palace
- Maironis Lithuanian Literature Museum
- Museum of the History of Lithuanian Medicine and Pharmacy
- Communication History Museum

== See also ==
- Vilnius Old Town
- Neighborhoods of Kaunas
