= Šimkūnas =

- Lithuanian surname
- m.: Šimkūnas
- f.: (unmarried): Šimkūnaitė
- f.: (married): Šimkūniene

Šimkūnas is a Lithuanian surname derived from the given name (which is also a surname) Šimkus, a diminutive of the name Simon (Šimon). Notable people with the surname include:

- Eugenija Šimkūnaitė (1920–1996), pharmacist, ethnographer, and herbalist
- Gabija Šimkūnaitė (born 2002), Lithuanian chess master
- Simonas Šimkūnas (1930–2021), Lithuanian energy engineer and athlete
