= List of botanical gardens in Lithuania =

This list of botanical gardens in Lithuania is intended to include all significant botanical gardens and arboretums in Lithuania.

- Botanical Garden of Klaipėda University – Klaipėda
- Botanical Garden of Vilnius University – Vilnius
- Dubrava Arboretum – Kaunas District Municipality
- Izidoriaus Navidansko Botanical Park – Ylakiai Eldership, Skuodas District Municipality
- Kretinga Winter Garden – Kretinga
- Palanga Botanical Park – Palanga
- Šiauliai University Botanical Garden – Šiauliai
- Traupis Primary School Botanical Garden – Traupis
- Vytautas Magnus University Botanical Garden – Kaunas
- Vytautas Magnus University Agriculture Academy Arboretum – Kaunas District Municipality

== See also ==
- Botanical garden
- Gardening
- History of gardening
- List of botanical gardens
