= Tadas Ivanauskas =

Lithuanian zoologist and biologist

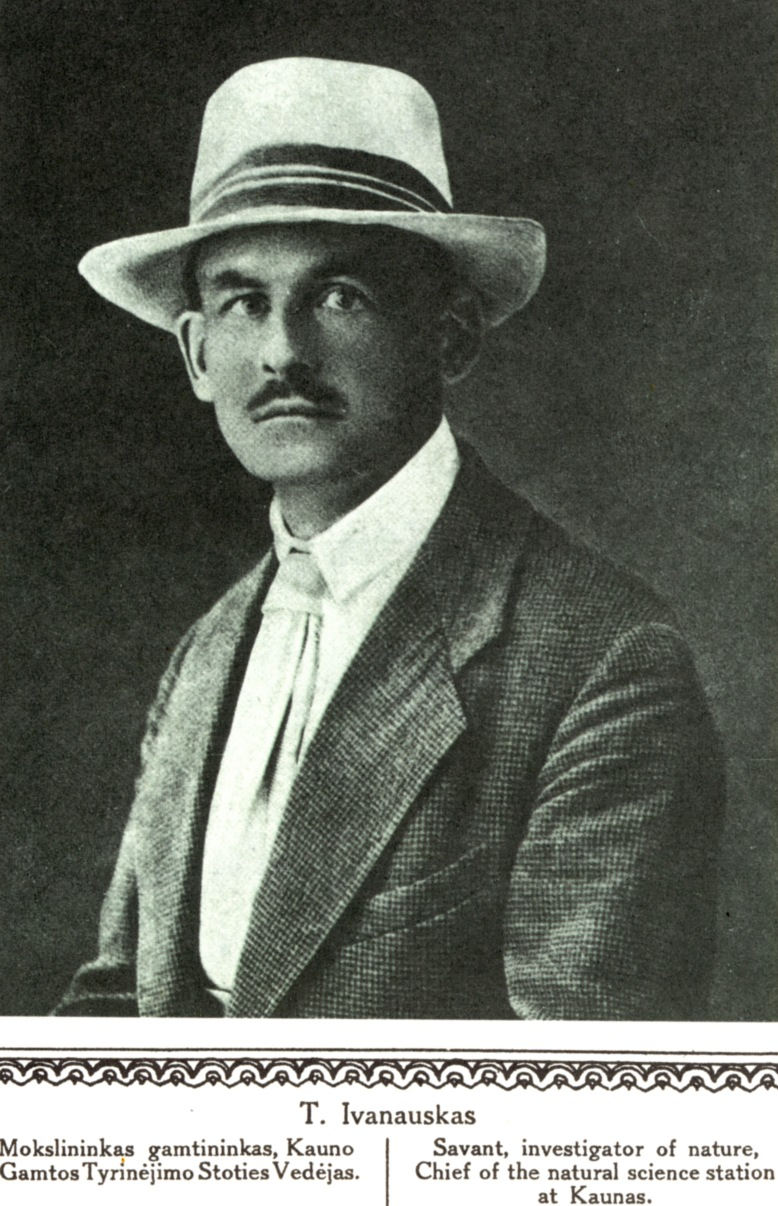
Tadas Ivanauskas

Tadas Ivanauskas (December 16, 1882 – June 1, 1970) was a Lithuanian zoologist and biologist, and one of the founders of Vytautas Magnus University.

== Biography ==
He was born in Lebiodka Manor (today Halavičpolie in Belarus) as a third child of Leonard Iwanowski and Jadwiga Reichel. After finishing Warsaw Gymnasium in 1901, Ivanauskas moved to Saint Petersburg, where he studied in the 1st gymnasium of the city. In 1903, he studied at the natural sciences department of the Saint Petersburg University. He met and befriended Lithuanian students here and learned the Lithuanian language.

In 1905, he moved to Paris, studied at Sorbonne University Nature-history faculty and graduated in 1909. Since 1904 he was a member of the Lithuanian society Lituania. Together with another early twentieth-century Lithuanian activist, Michał Römer, Ivanauskas gave lectures about Lithuania in Paris in 1905.

In 1909, he again entered Saint Petersburg University, as Russian Empire did not recognize foreign diplomas, and finished with a first-grade diploma in 1910. During his studies, he was active in Lithuanian student society, and was elected as chairman.

In 1910, in Saint Petersburg, he established the natural sciences visual devices laboratory Zootom, which prepared various biological, botanical, anatomical and mineralogical devices. In the summertime, he travelled around Lithuania collecting material for his devices. In 1914 and 1917, Ivanauskas participated in scientific expeditions into Northern Russia (Murmansk and Arkhangelsk) and Norway. In 1918 Ivanauskas returned to Lithuania and together with his wife Honorata opened a Lithuanian school.

In 1920, he moved to Kaunas and worked as an adviser in the Ministry of Agriculture of Lithuania, also helped organize Higher courses, that later became the University of Lithuania. Together with Konstantinas Regelis organized Kaunas Botanical Park in 1923. Together with his wife, he started organizing the annual National day of birds and Tree planting days.

He was a professor in University of Lithuania (later Vytautas Magnus University) from 1922 until 1940, and in 1929, became the head of the Zoology Department. He became a professor at the re-established Vilnius University between 1940 and 1941. He returned to this position in 1944, which he held until 1956. He simultaneously held a professorship at the Kaunas Medical Institute from 1954 until 1970.

Among his other achievements, he is known for opening one of the first bird banding stations in Europe, at Ventė Cape in 1929. He also founded the Zoological Museum in 1918, the Kaunas Botanical Garden in 1923, Žuvintas reserve in 1937, and the Kaunas Zoo in 1938.

Ivanauskas published 37 books and brochures, the most famous of them - Birds of Lithuania. Since 1941 he was a full member of the Lithuanian Academy of Sciences.

== Nationality ==
Born as Tadeusz Iwanowski in Lebiodka, Grodno Region of today's Belarus, in a Catholic Lithuanian noble family loyal to the heritage of Grand Duchy of Lithuania, he did not know the Lithuanian language until 1905. Even so, Ivanauskas considered himself to be Lithuanian and dedicated his life to Lithuania. He opened the first Lithuanian school with his wife in 1918. There was a noted episode during Polish–Lithuanian War, as one of his brothers during ceasefire transferred Tadas' taxidermical collection through the front line into Lithuania.

The other three brothers of Ivanauskas identified themselves with the other two nationalities of former Polish–Lithuanian Commonwealth, two (Jerzy Iwanowski - politician and engineer and Stanisław Iwanowski - lawyer) chose to become Polish, and one Vacłaŭ Ivanoŭski (politician) - Belarusian (although he would live in interwar Poland).
