= Shimkus =

Shimkus is a phonetic spelling of the Lithuanian surname Šimkus, derived from the name Simon, and may refer to:

- Carley Shimkus (born 1986), American television journalist
- Frank Andrews Shimkus (born 1952), American retired broadcaster and politician
- Joanna Shimkus (born 1943), Canadian former actress, wife of American actor Sidney Poitier
- John Shimkus (born 1958), American politician

== See also ==
Similar surnames:

- Shimko
- Shimek (disambiguation)
