= Eugenija Šimkūnaitė =

Lithuanian botanist

- Born: 11 February 1920; Novorossiysk, Krasnodar Krai, Russia
- Died: 27 January 1996 (aged 75); Vilnius, Lithuania
- Education: Vytautas Magnus University, Vilnius University
- Scientific career
- Workplaces: Kaunas Botanical Garden

Eugenija Šimkūnaitė (11 February 1920 – 27 January 1996) was a Lithuanian pharmacist, ethnographer, and herbalist.

== Biography ==
Eugenija Šimkūnaitė was born in Novorossiysk, Krasnodar Krai, Russia on 11 February 1920. Her father, Franz Šimkūno, was a pharmacist and her mother, Olga Lebedeva, was a nurse. In 1922, the family left with other refugees to return to Lithuania. The family settled in Tauragnai, where her father opened a pharmacy. After primary school, Šimkūnaitė attended Utena high school, graduating in 1937. In the same year, she entered Vytautas Magnus University to study pharmacy. In 1941, she worked in a pharmacy in Tauragnai, and then in Vilnius University in 1942, graduating in 1943.

In 1945, Šimkūnaitė was employed as the pharmacist within Vilnius Hospital. In 1947, she was appointed the Ministry of Health Pharmaceutical Board of Trade Division inspector. She moved to Kaunas in 1949 to work as a junior research assistant in the Kaunas Botanical Garden and to start on her doctoral thesis. Šimkūnaitė returned to Vilnius in September 1950 to continue her doctoral research in the Academy of Sciences Institute of Biology, defending her thesis in 1952.

From 1955 to 1957, she worked in Kazakhstan at the All Union medicinal plant farm. Returning to Lithuania in 1957, she was again employed by the Ministry of Health Pharmaceutical Board as an inspector, becoming the head of the herbal section in 1969. She retired in 1975. In 1993, the Lithuanian Science Council awarded her a doctor of natural sciences degree. She died on 27 January 1996, and is buried beside her parents in Tauragnai.

== Legacy ==
The Eugenija Šimkūnaitė Memorial Foundation was founded in 1997, which aims to promote studying pharmaceuticals, and work in the field of herbal research. In 1998, the Tauragnai secondary school was named in her honour.
