= Tadas Ivanauskas Zoological Museum =

Coordinates: 54°53′53″N 23°54′15″E

- Tado Ivanausko zoologijos muziejus

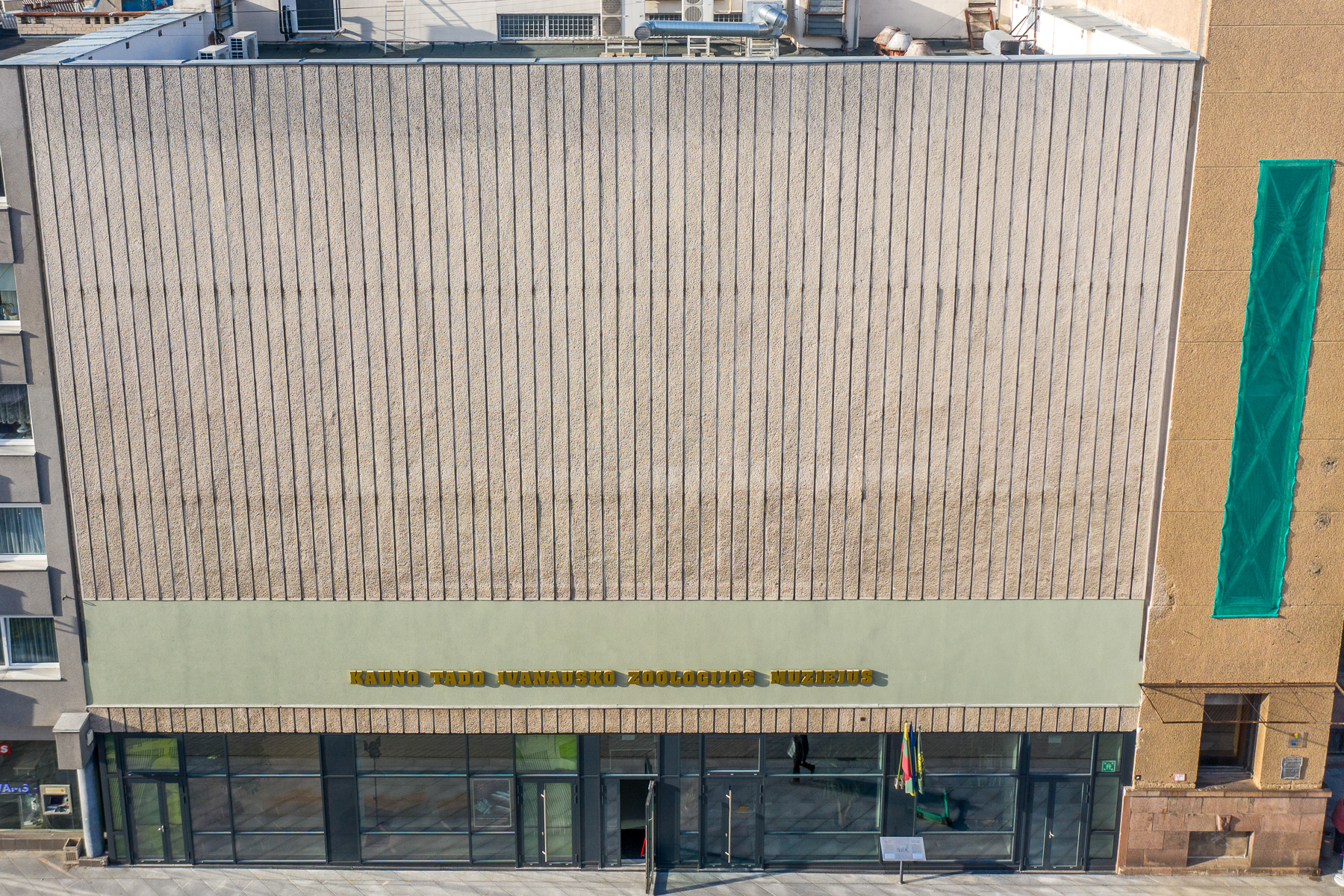
- The Tadas Ivanauskas Zoological Museum Building, in Kaunas, Lithuania
- Established: July 15, 1919; 107 years ago
- Location: Laisvės alėja 106, Kaunas, Lithuania
- Type: museum of zoology
- Director: Ramūnas Grigonis
- Employees: 68 (as of August, 2024)
- Website: www.zoomuziejus.lt

The Tadas Ivanauskas Zoological Museum (Lithuanian: Kauno Tado Ivanausko zoologijos muziejus) is a museum of zoology, established in Kaunas, Lithuania, in 1919 by Tadas Ivanauskas (1882–1970).

The museum collects and exhibits various animals: hunting trophies, stuffed animals, insect collections, skeletons, and dissections. It is also an educational and research institution that has four branches: bird ringing stations in Ventė Cape and Juodkrantė, nature reserves in Čepkeliai Marsh and Lake Žuvintas.

== History ==
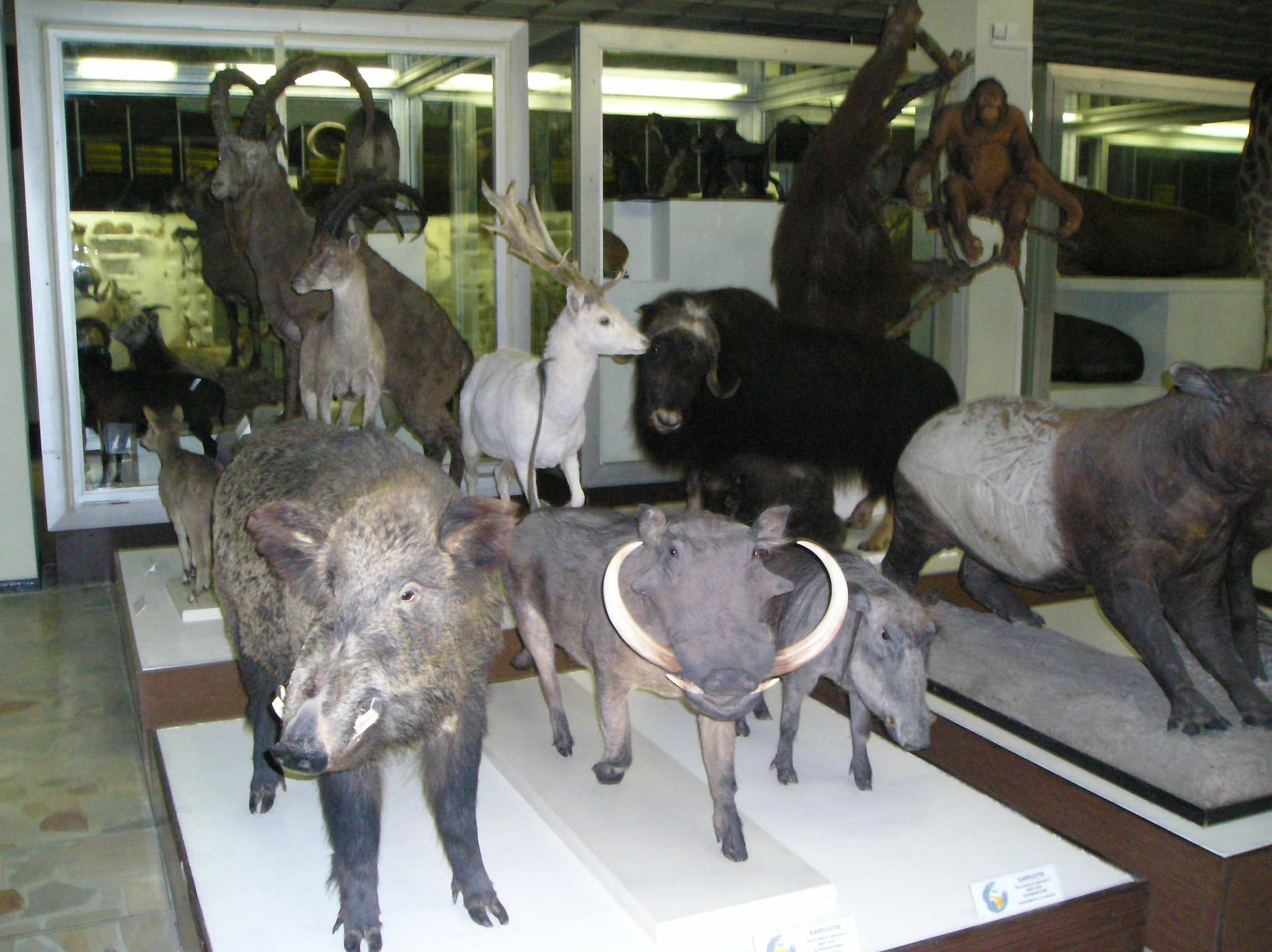
Taxidermy exhibits in the Tadas Ivanauskas Zoological Museum

The museum was established on 15 July 1919 together with the Natural Research Station in Kaunas, Vilnius Street. It began with a zoological collection belonging to the head of the station, Tadas Ivanauskas, which was brought from the Lebiodka manor of Ivanauskas noble family in the Lida region. A few years later, the Nature Research Station was transferred to the newly established Vytautas Magnus University and became the Department of Zoology and Comparative Anatomy. The museum served as a teaching facility for students and a repository for scientific collections. In 1929 it was moved to new premises in K. Donelaitis Street, where it was possible to set up an exhibition open to the public. During the first Soviet occupation in 1940, the Department of Zoology and Comparative Anatomy was moved to Vilnius University, while the museum remained in Kaunas. In 1945, the Institute of Biology of the Lithuanian Academy of Sciences became the Museum's administrator. This gave rise to an independent institution - the Kaunas Zoological Museum. In 1948, it was moved to the premises of a former bank at 106 Laisvės Avenue, where it currently operates. In 1963, the Museum was transferred to the Committee for Nature Conservation under the Council of Ministers of the LSSR and remained under this jurisdiction throughout the complex development of this institution until it was transferred to the Ministry of Environment of the Republic of Lithuania. In 1975-82, the museum building was reconstructed and a new exposition was built. In 1970, the museum was named after the founder and long-time coordinator Tadas Ivanauskas.
