= Šiauliai University Botanical Garden =

Botanical garden in Lithuania

Vilnius University Šiauliai Academy Botanical Garden
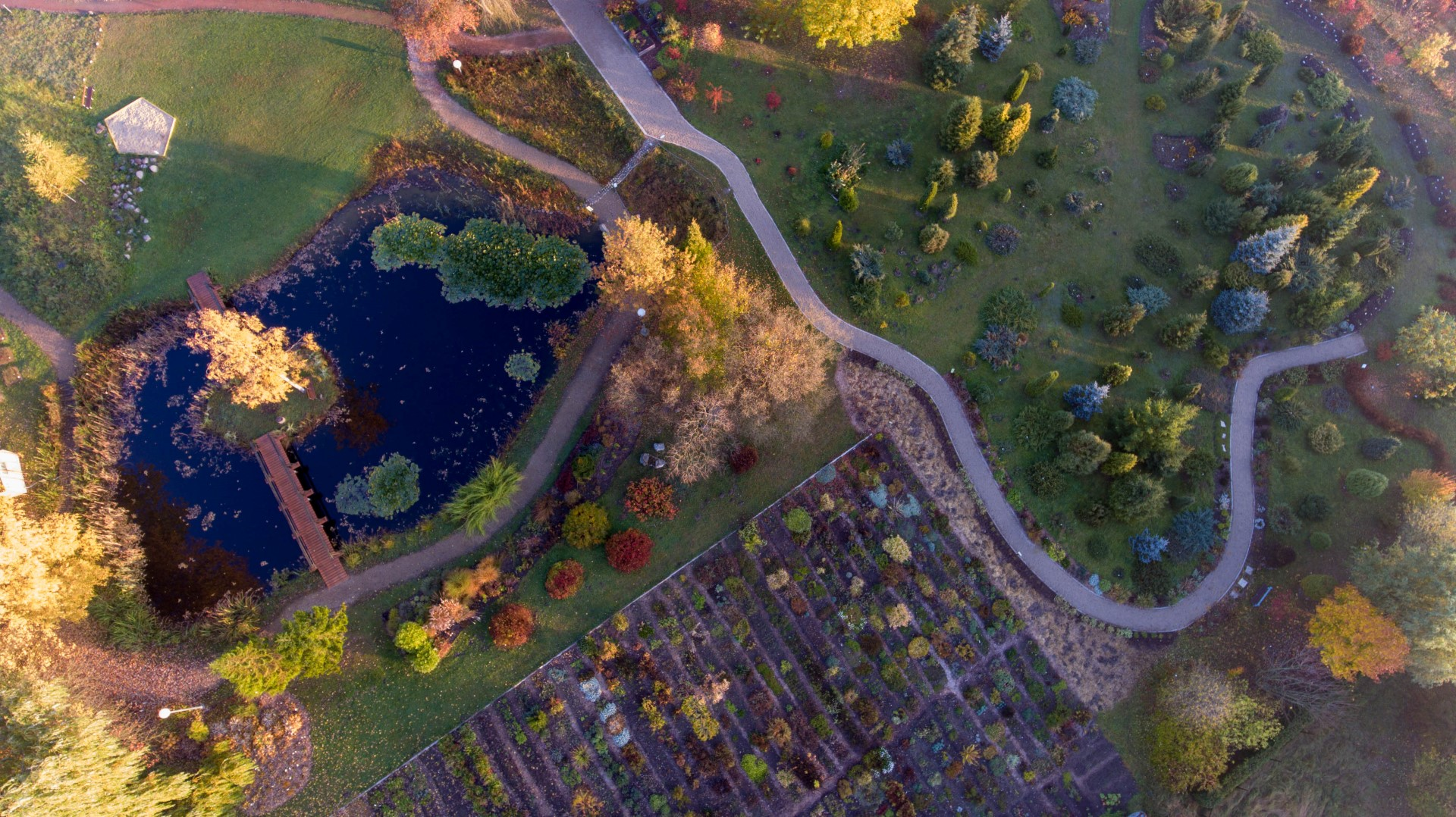
- Bird eye view to the garden

- Location within Lithuania
- Type: Botanic garden
- Location: Šiauliai, Lithuania
- Coordinates: 55°55′58″N 23°16′59″E
- Area: 6.54 hectares (16.2 acres)
- Created: 1997
- Visitors: 25,000
- Plants: 11,000
- Species: 905

Vilnius University Šiauliai Academy Botanical Garden (Lithuanian: Vilniaus universiteto Šiaulių akademijos Botanikos sodas) is a botanical garden established in 1997 and operated by the Šiauliai University, and located at Paitaičių str. 4, Šiauliai, Lithuania.

Botanical Garden is a member of the Lithuanian Association of University Botanical Gardens (LAUBG), the Association of Baltic Botanic Gardens (ABBG), the Botanic Garden Conservation International (BGCI) and the Network of Botanic Gardens in the Baltic Sea Region.

== Collections ==
Accession Number: 4000

Special collections: Systematic and plant geography collection – 905 species, Ericaceae family plants – 300 taxa, Ornamental plants – 1200 taxa, Alpine plants – 987 species, Ligneous plants – 600 species. Lithuanian native flora – 180 taxa.
