= Simonas Šimkūnas =

Simonas Šimkūnas (January 19, 1930 – April 19, 2021) was a Lithuanian energy engineer and athlete.

Simonas Šimkūnas was born in the village of Liepdegėnai (Anykščiai valsčius, interwar Lithuania, now in Anykščiai District Municipality, Lithuania).

He graduated from the Belarusian Polytechnic Institute (1951-1956) and after returning to Lithuania he held various managerial and functionary positions in energy engineering, including overseeing the construction of various energy facilities.

During his student times he became engaged in sports first in boxing, later in wrestling. He was the champion of Lithuania in the heavyweight category of wrestling several times (1956, 1957, 1959, 1960, and 1961). This earned him the nickname "Liebdegeniai Oak". He was a long-time president of the Lithuanian Wrestling Federation (1966–1971 and 1984–1988) and refereed wrestling tournaments in the country and abroad.

== Honors ==
- 1981: Honored Engineer of Lithuanian SSR title
- 2010: Letter of Appreciation from the President of the Lithuanian Electricity Association
