= Constantin Andreas von Regel =

Russian and Lithuanian horticulturalist and botanist

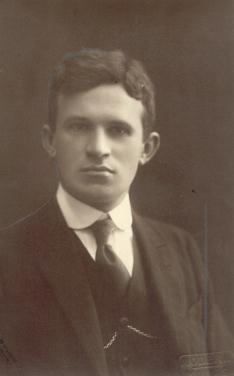
- Born: 10 August 1890; Saint Petersburg, Russia
- Died: 22 May 1970 (aged 79); Zürich, Switzerland
- Occupation(s): Botanist, Director of the Kaunas Botanical Garden.

Constantin Andreas von Regel (Lithuanian: Konstantinas Regelis; 10 August 1890, in Saint Petersburg – 22 May 1970, in Zürich) was a German-Lithuanian horticulturalist and botanist. He was a grandson of Eduard August von Regel.

In 1922 he was named head of the department of botany at the Kaunas University. During the following year he became director of the newly established botanical garden at Kaunas. He was the author of approximately 150 scientific books and articles, including significant works in the fields of geobotany and phytogeography. Von Regel edited three exsiccata works, namely Flora exsiccata Lituana. Spermatophyta, Flora exsiccata Lituana. Spermatophyta et Pteridophyta and Flora exsiccata Iraqiensis.

== Selected works ==
- Die Vegetationsverhältnisse der Halbinsel Kola, 1935.
- Florae Graecae Notulae 1941.
- Pflanzen in Europa liefern Rohstoffe, 1944.
- Die Klimaänderung der Gegenwart in ihrer Beziehung zur Landschaft, 1957.
- Die Rohstoffe des Pflanzenreichs (original author, Julius Wiesner), 1962.
