= Šimkus =

- Lithuanian surname
- m.: Šimkus
- f.: (unmarried): Šimkutė
- f.: (married): Šimkienė
- Related names: Shimkus, Simkus

Šimkus (may also be rendered as Shimkus (phonetic) or Simkus (loss of diacritics)) is a Lithuanian-language surname derived from the name Simon (Šimon).

The surname may refer to:

- Stasys Šimkus, Lithuanian composer
- Vestards Šimkus, Latvian pianist and composer
