= Ylakiai Eldership =

Eldership of Lithuania

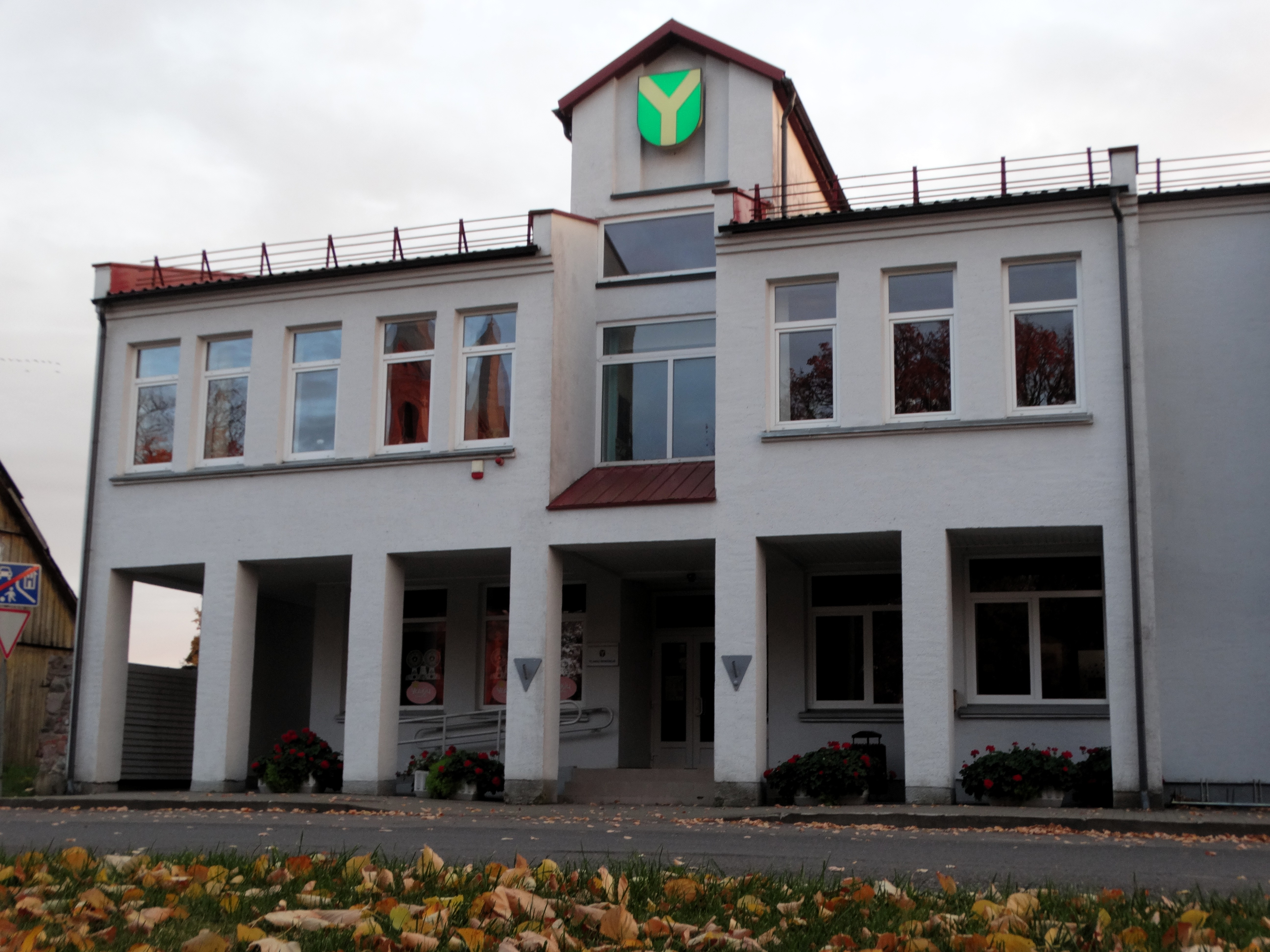
Ylakiai, eldership, Skuodas District, Lithuania

The Ylakiai Eldership (Lithuanian: Ylakių seniūnija) is an eldership of Lithuania, located in the Skuodas District Municipality. In 2021 its population was 2308.
