= Vytautas Magnus University Botanical Garden =

University botanical garden in Kaunas city

Vytautas Magnus University Botanical Garden in Kaunas
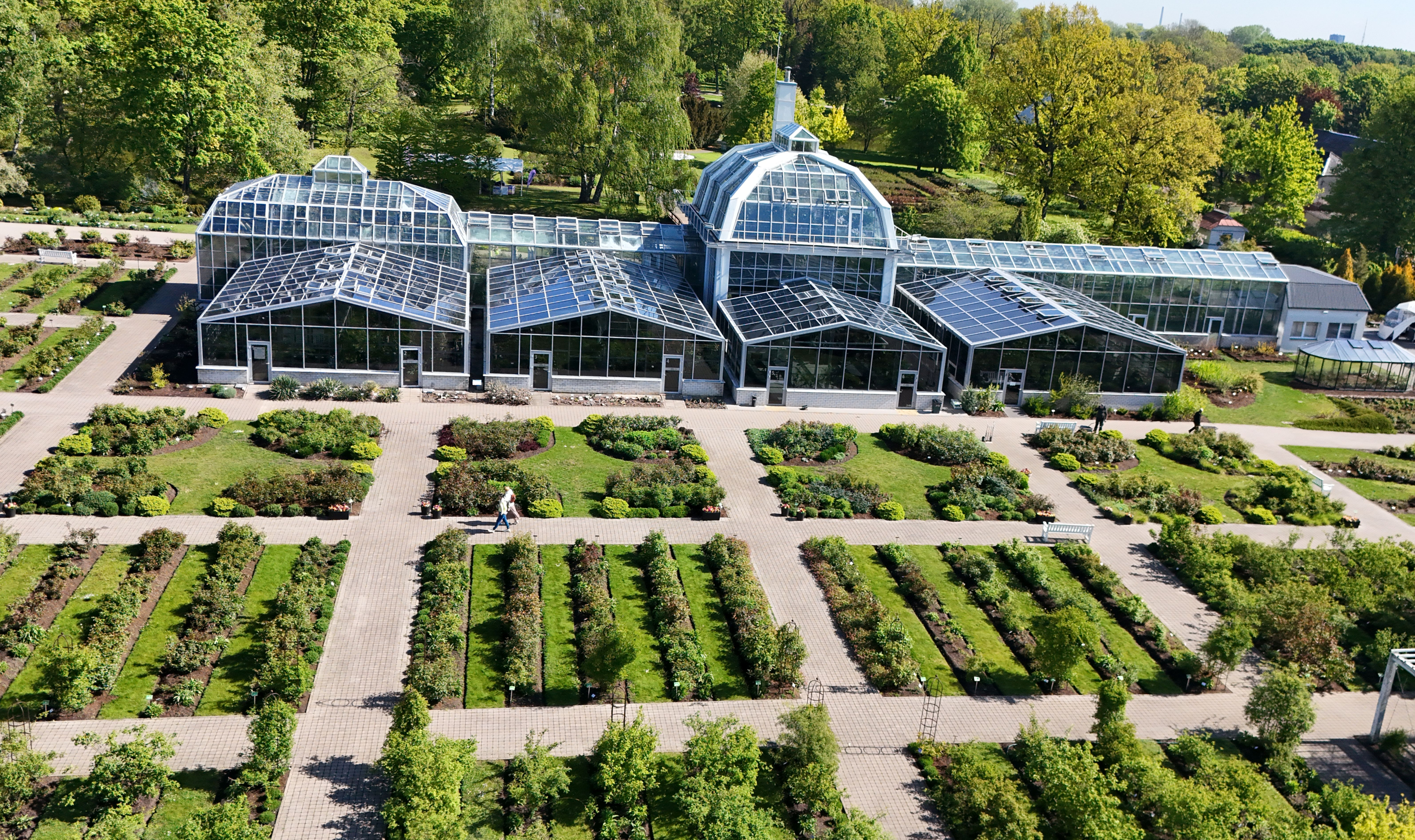
- Greenhouse
- Interactive map of Vytautas Magnus University Botanical Garden in Kaunas
- Type: Botanical
- Location: Kaunas, Lithuania
- Coordinates: 54°52′14″N 23°54′37″E
- Area: 62.5 hectares (154 acres)
- Opened: 1923
- Owner: Vytautas Magnus University
- Status: Open
- Website: http://botanika.vdu.lt/en/

Vytautas Magnus University Botanical Garden, also known as the Kaunas Botanical Garden (Lithuanian: Vytauto Didžiojo universiteto Botanikos sodas; Latin: Hortus Botanicus Universitati Vytauti Magni), is a university-affiliated botanical garden located in the south of the Freda district, in the southern part of central Kaunas, at Ž.E.Žilibero Street 6.

With an area of 62.5 ha (154 acres), it is the second-largest botanical garden in Lithuania. This institution is a member of BGCI and is registered under the international identification code KAUN.

== About the Garden ==
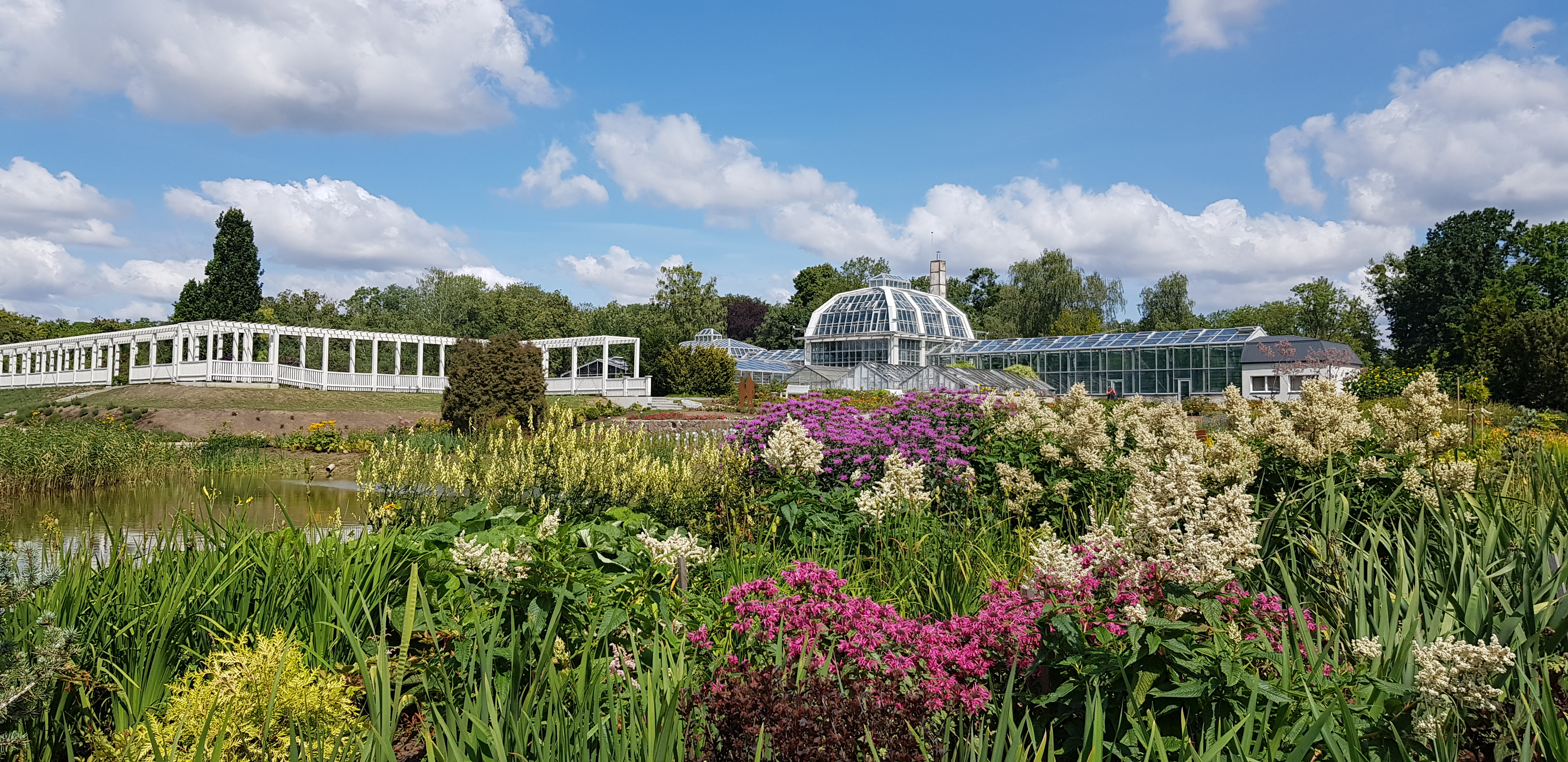
View to the garden

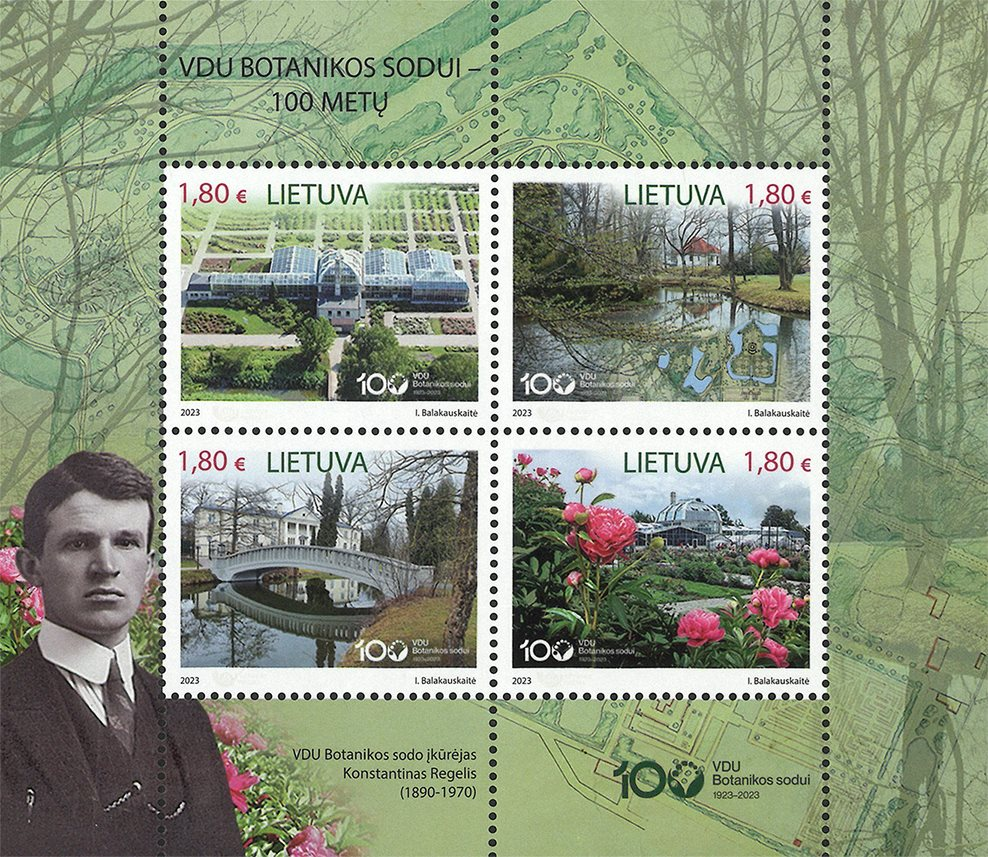
Miniature sheet for the centenary of Vytautas Magnus University Botanical Garden (2023) with a photo of the first director (Constantin von Regel)

The Botanical Garden was founded in 1923 as a centre for botanical sciences affiliated with the then-Lithuanian University (later renamed Vytautas Magnus University). The site selected for the garden was part of the historic Aukštoji Freda estate, formerly owned by Aukštoji Freda. This spacious green area featured an old park, scenic ponds, and several manor buildings, making it an ideal setting for the new botanical institution.

Professor Constantin Andreas von Regel from the University of Tartu was invited to lead the establishment of the Kaunas Botanical Garden. In 1924, architect Karol Rauth from Hanover prepared a detailed landscape design for the site. With support from several renowned botanical gardens—particularly those in Berlin-Dahlem, Königsberg, and St. Petersburg—the Kaunas Botanical Garden developed rapidly. The construction of the greenhouse was completed in 1938.

Today, Vytautas Magnus University Botanical Garden covers 62.5 hectares near the city centre and functions as a multifunctional university botanical garden, structured into three departments: Science (subdivided into Medicinal and Spice Plants; Dendrology and Phytopathology; and Pomology), Expositions and Collections (including Plant Systematics, Floriculture, and the greenhouse), and Service and Education.

Comprising botanical exhibits, collections, a historic greenhouse, and an extensive landscape park featuring a pond system, the facility functions as a center for plant conservation, scientific research, interactive education, cultural tourism, and community engagement. The institution records an annual attendance exceeding 90,000 visitors.

Vytautas Magnus University Botanical Garden is a member of several networks and associations, including the Lithuanian Association of University Botanical Gardens (LAUBG), the Association of Baltic Botanic Gardens (ABBG), the Botanic Garden Conservation International (BGCI), and the Network of Botanic Gardens in the Baltic Sea region.

== Directors ==
- Constantin Andreas von Regel (1923–1940)
- Kazimieras Grybauskas (1940–1952)
- Marija Lukaitienė (1952–1961)
- Algimantas Morkūnas (1961–1975)
- Aloyzas Ramunis Budriūnas (1975–2000)
- Remigijus Daubaras (2000–2008)
- Vida Mildažienė (2008–2015)
- Nerijus Jurkonis (2015–present)

== Gallery ==
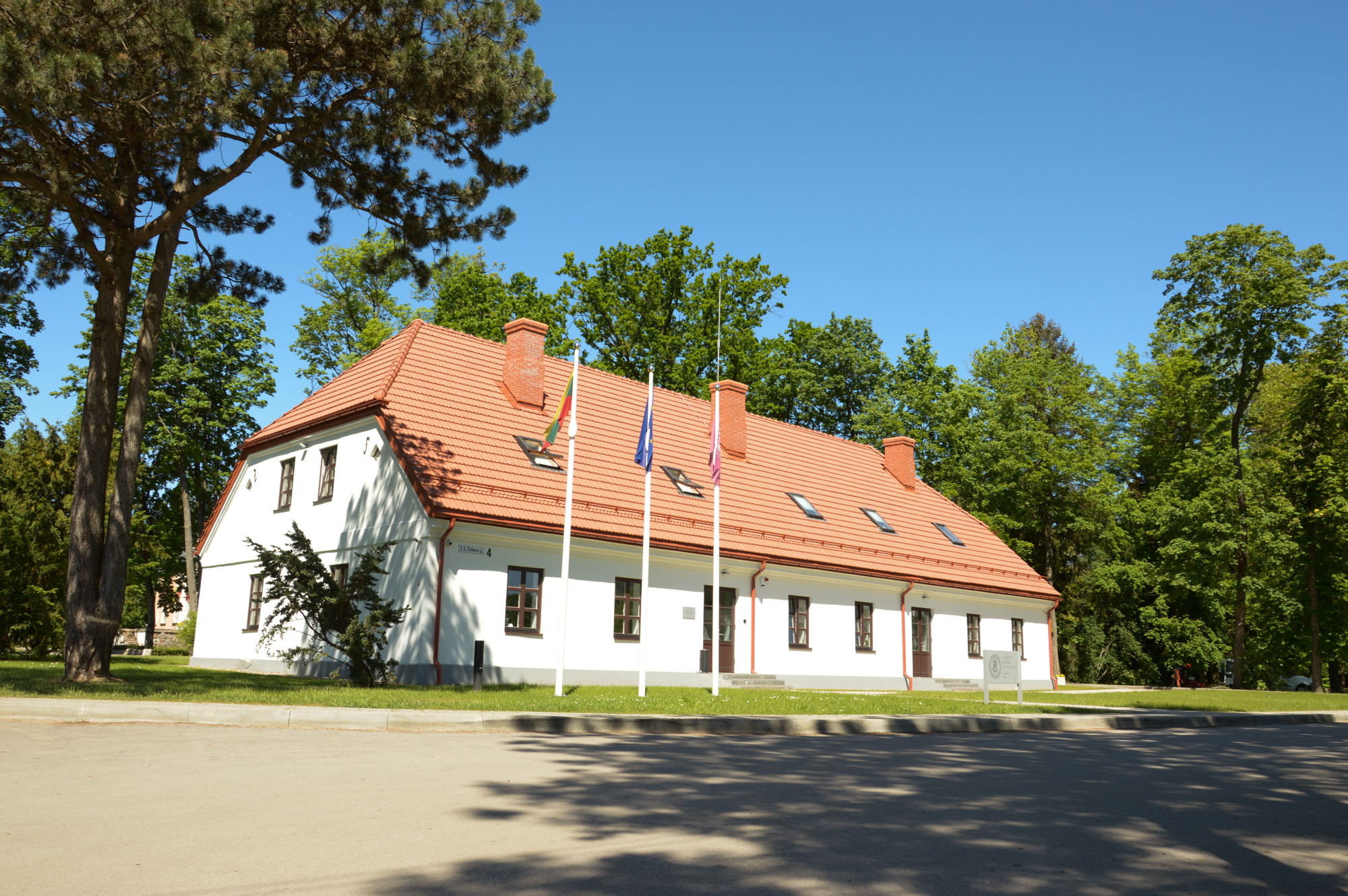
Administration office building

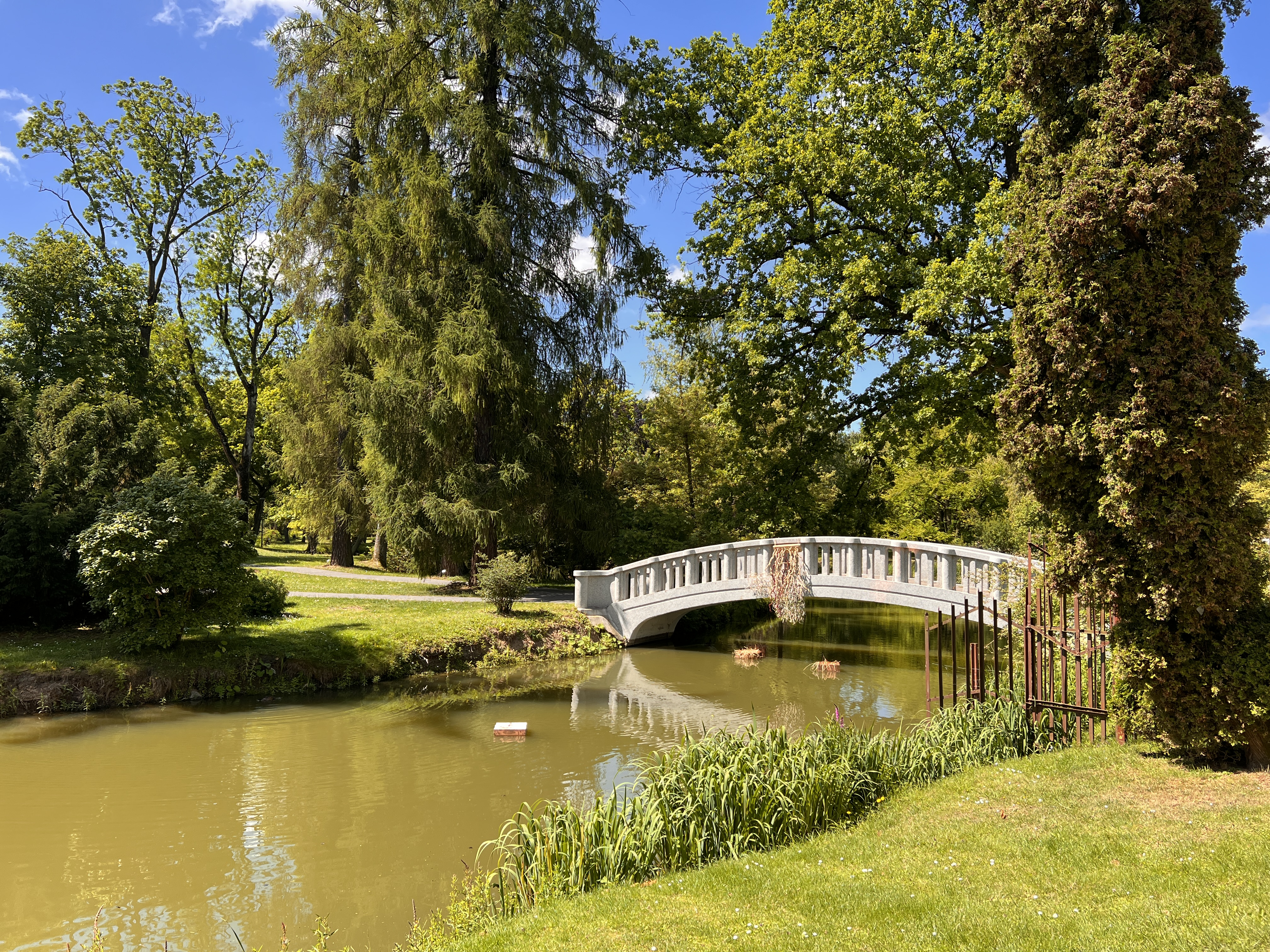
The pond with the bridge

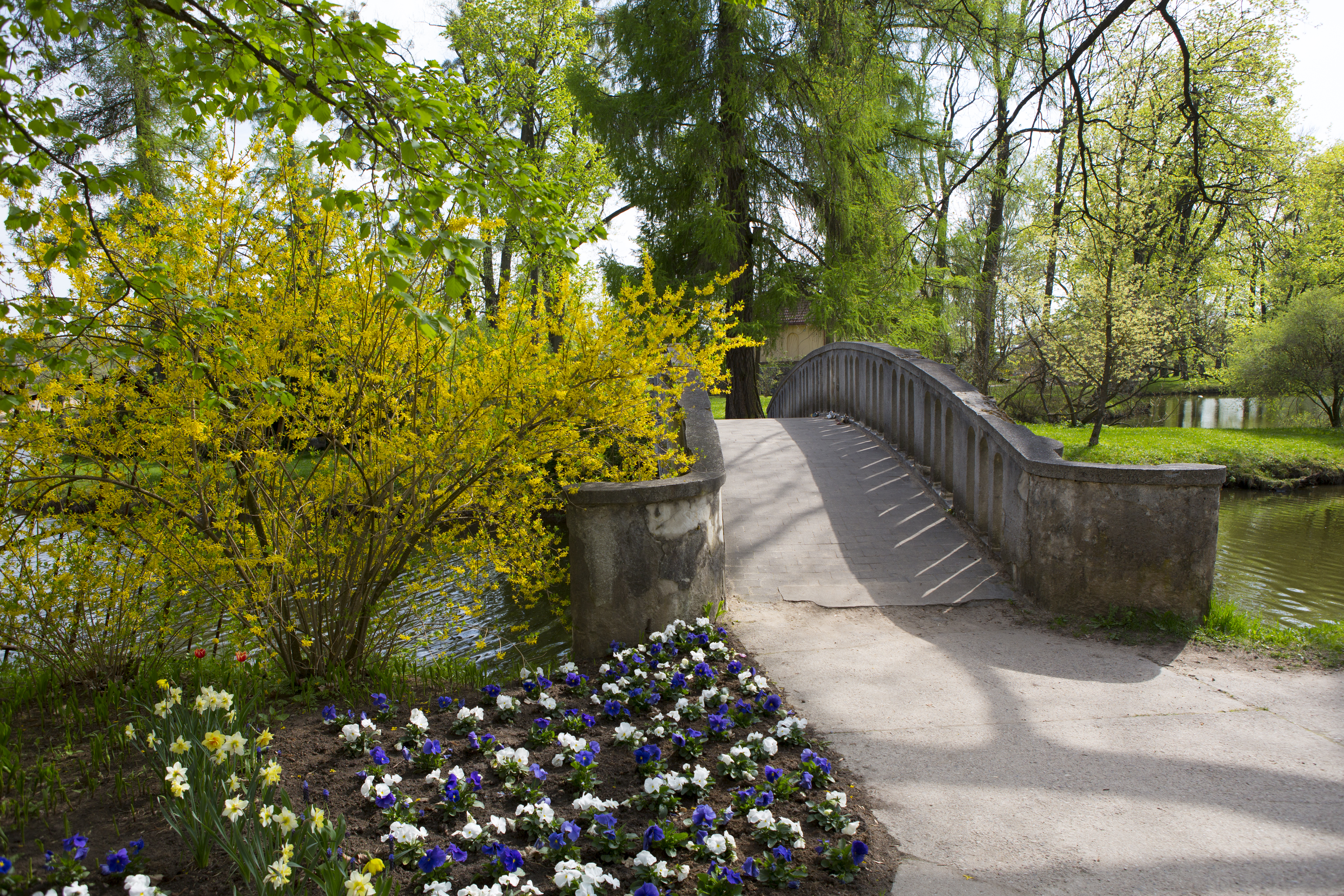
Entrance to the garden

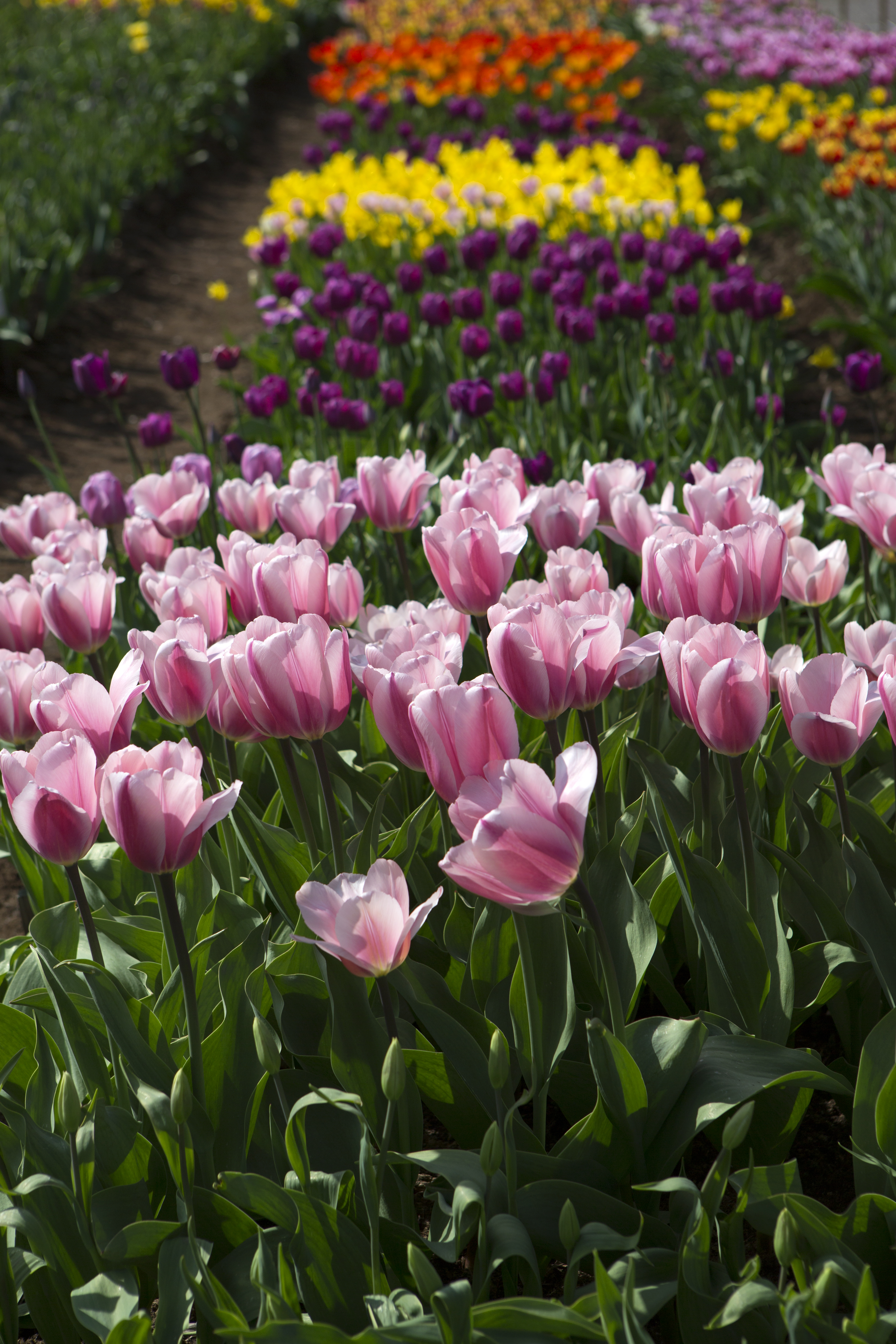
Tulips

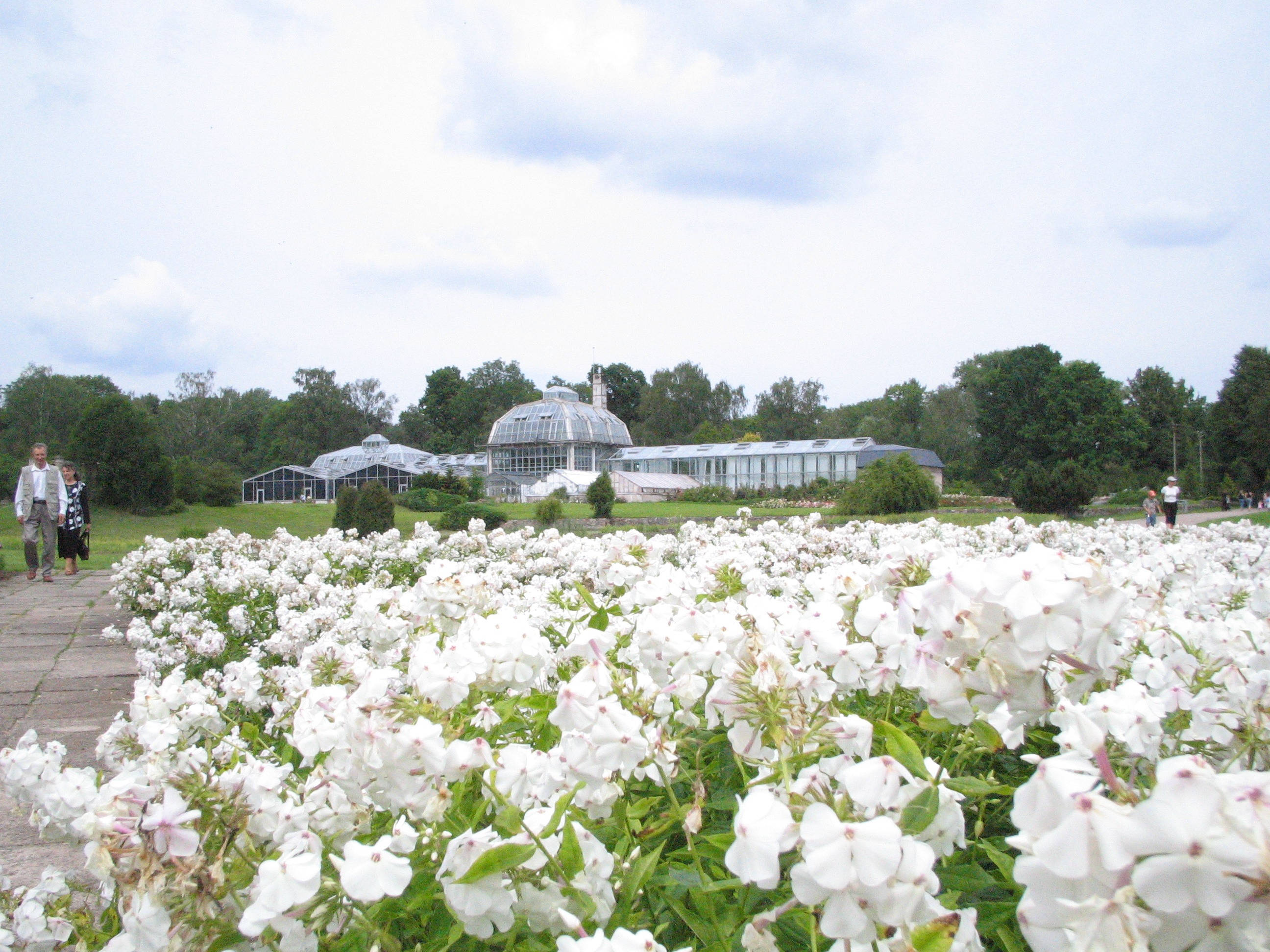
Ornamental plants

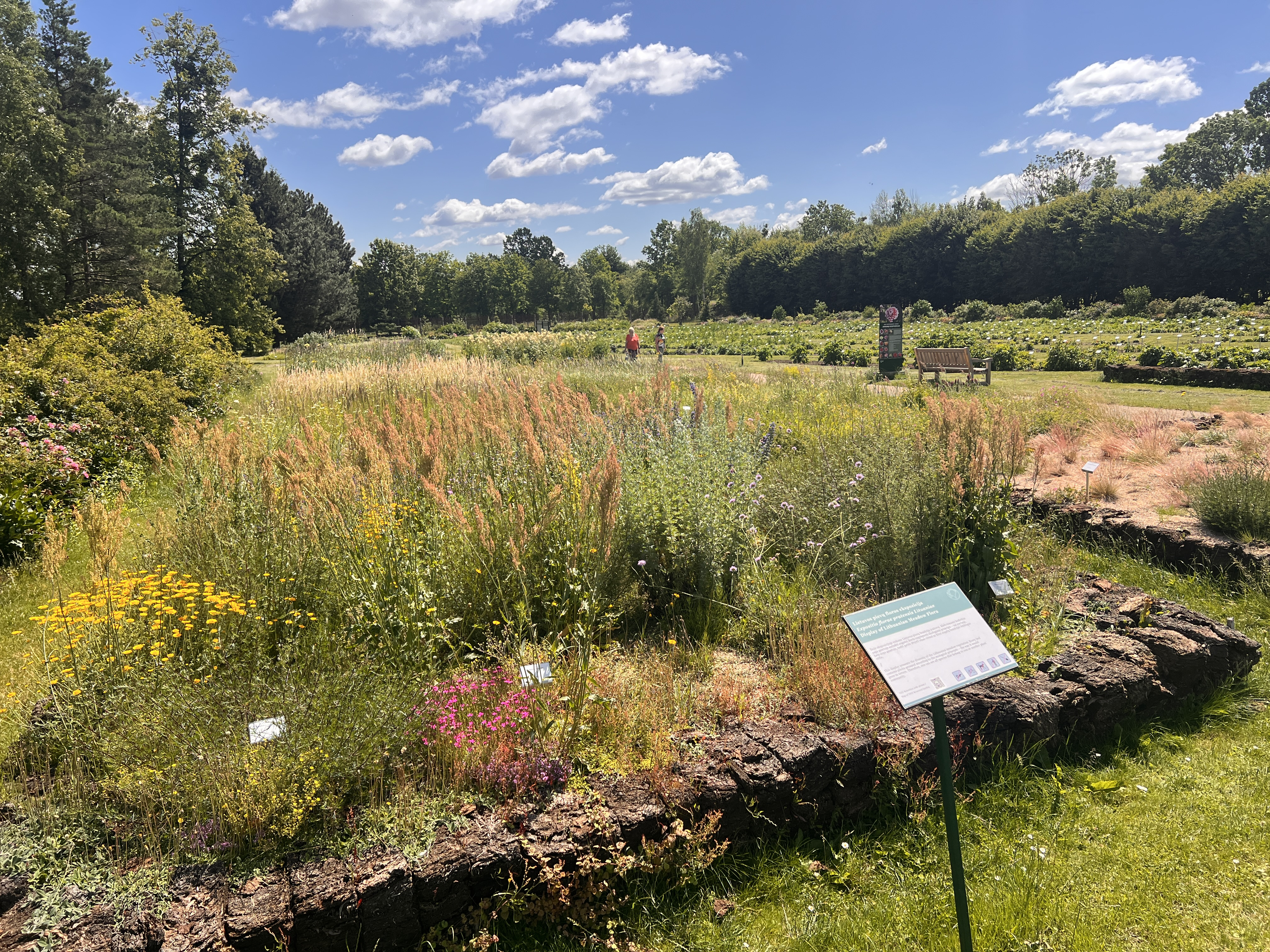
Display of Lithuanian meadow flora

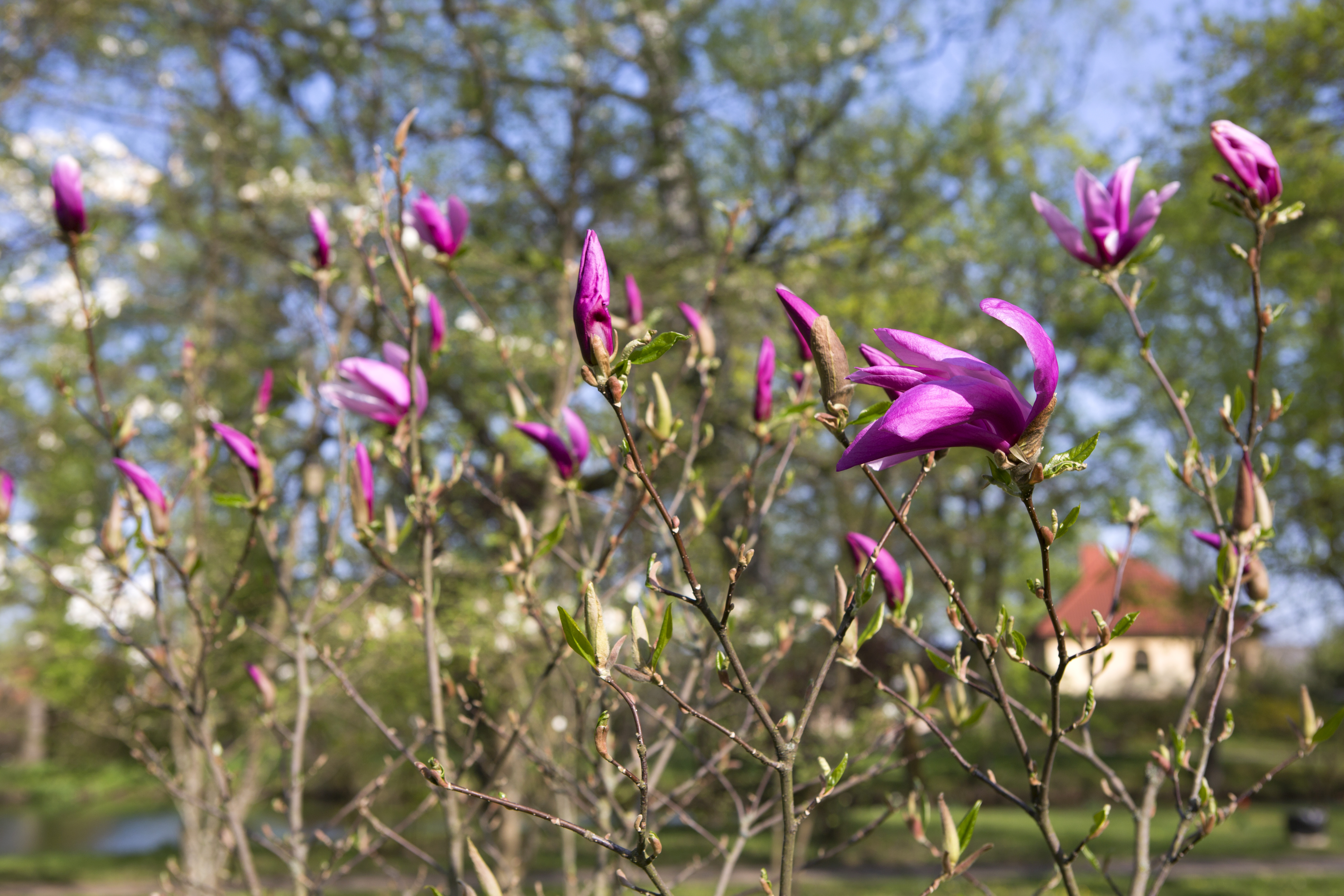
Magnolias

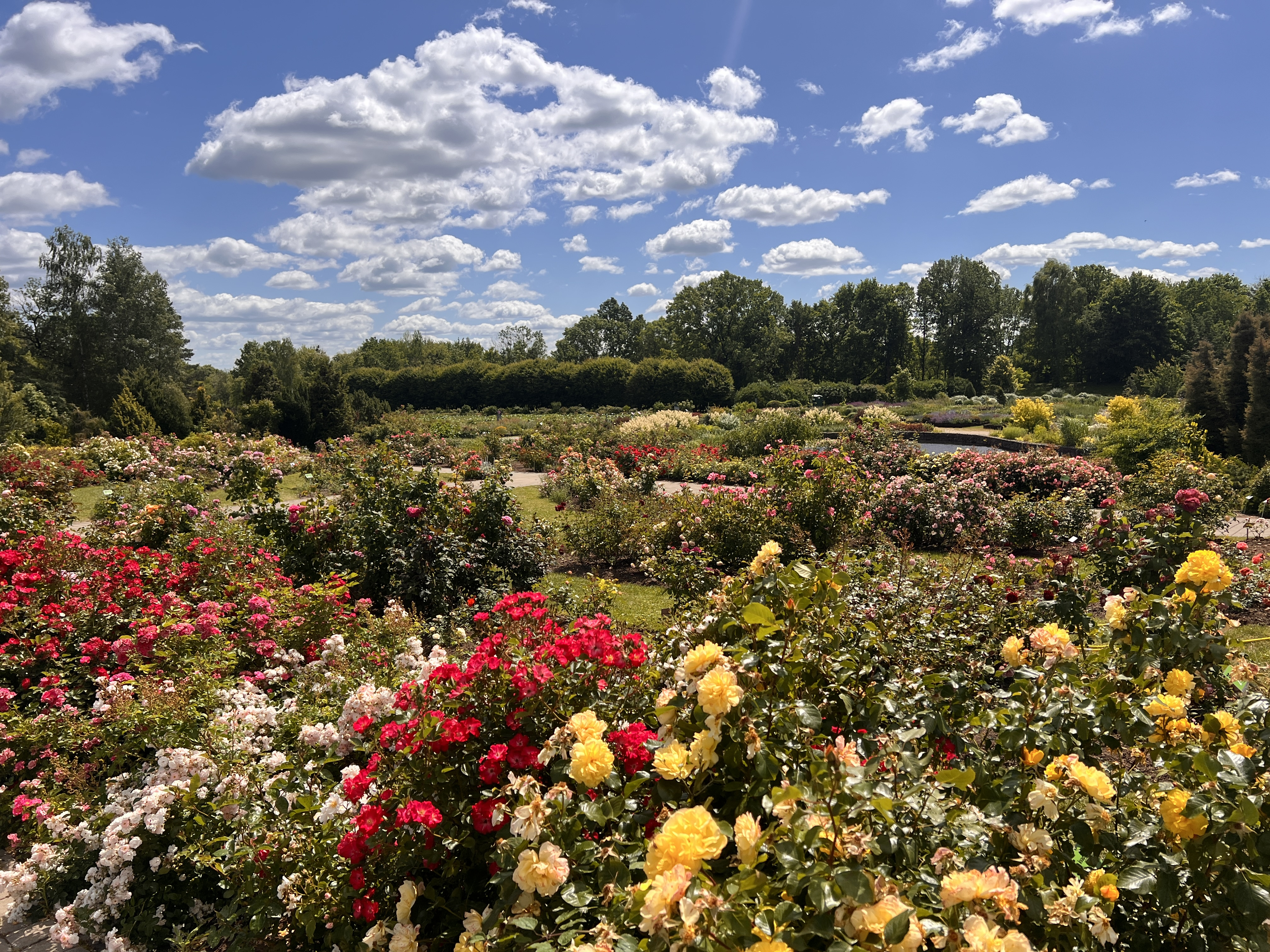
Rose garden

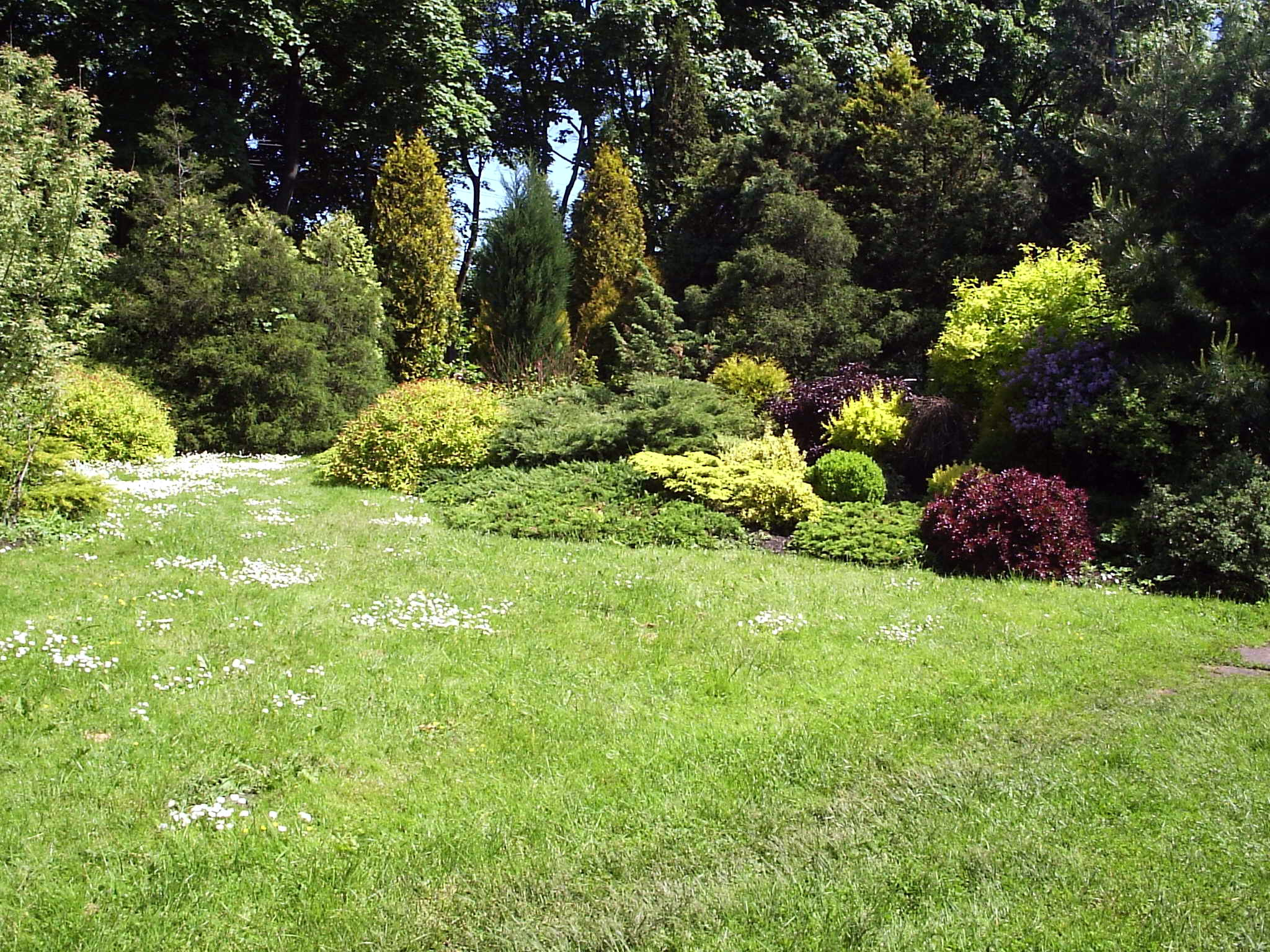
Woody Plant Collection

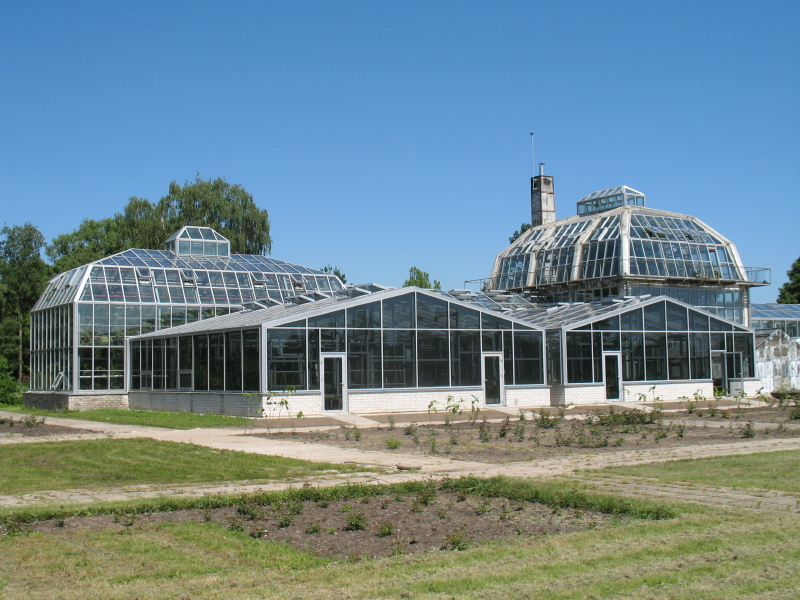
Greenhouse in 2007

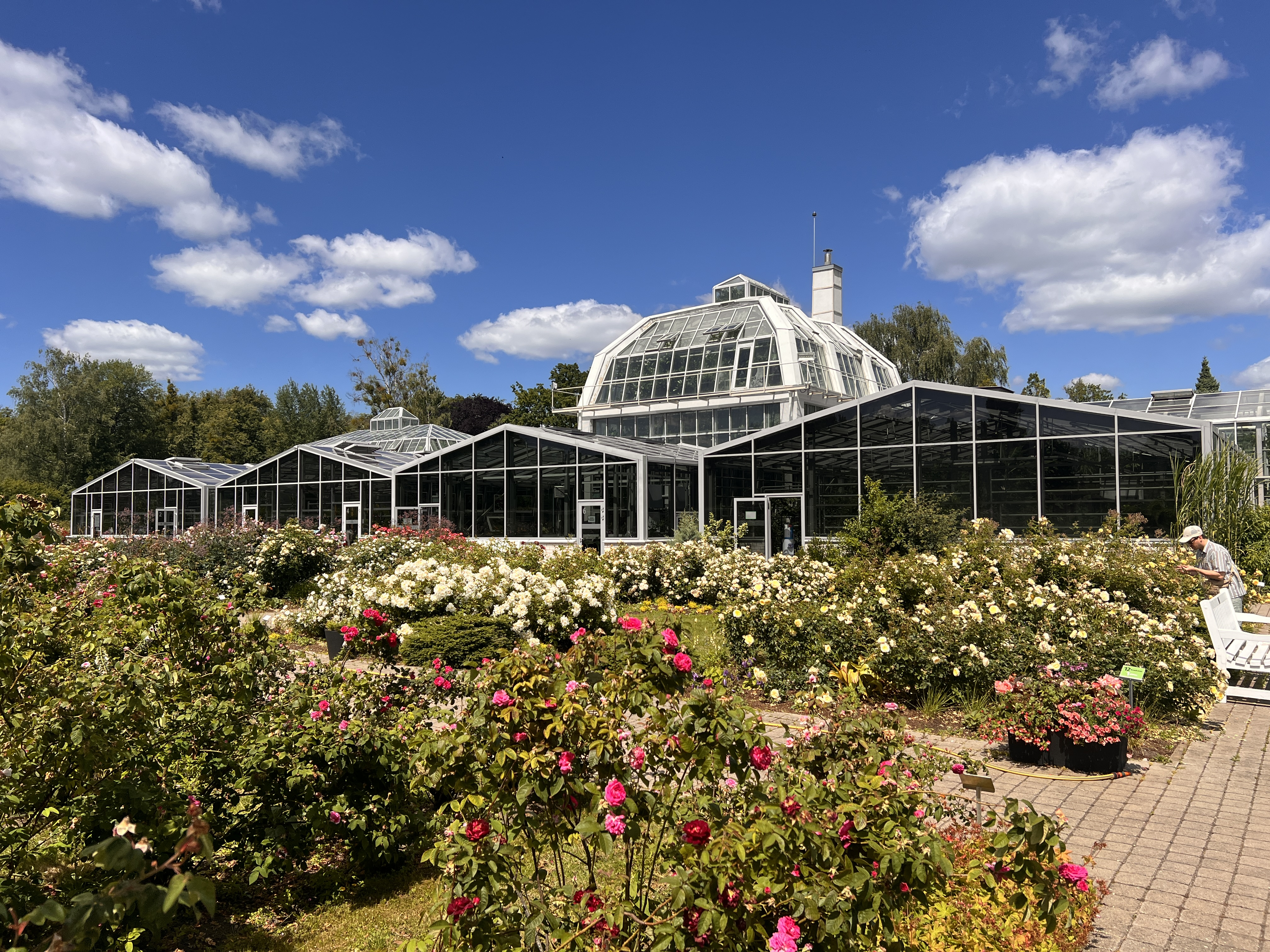
The rose garden with the greenhouse in 2025

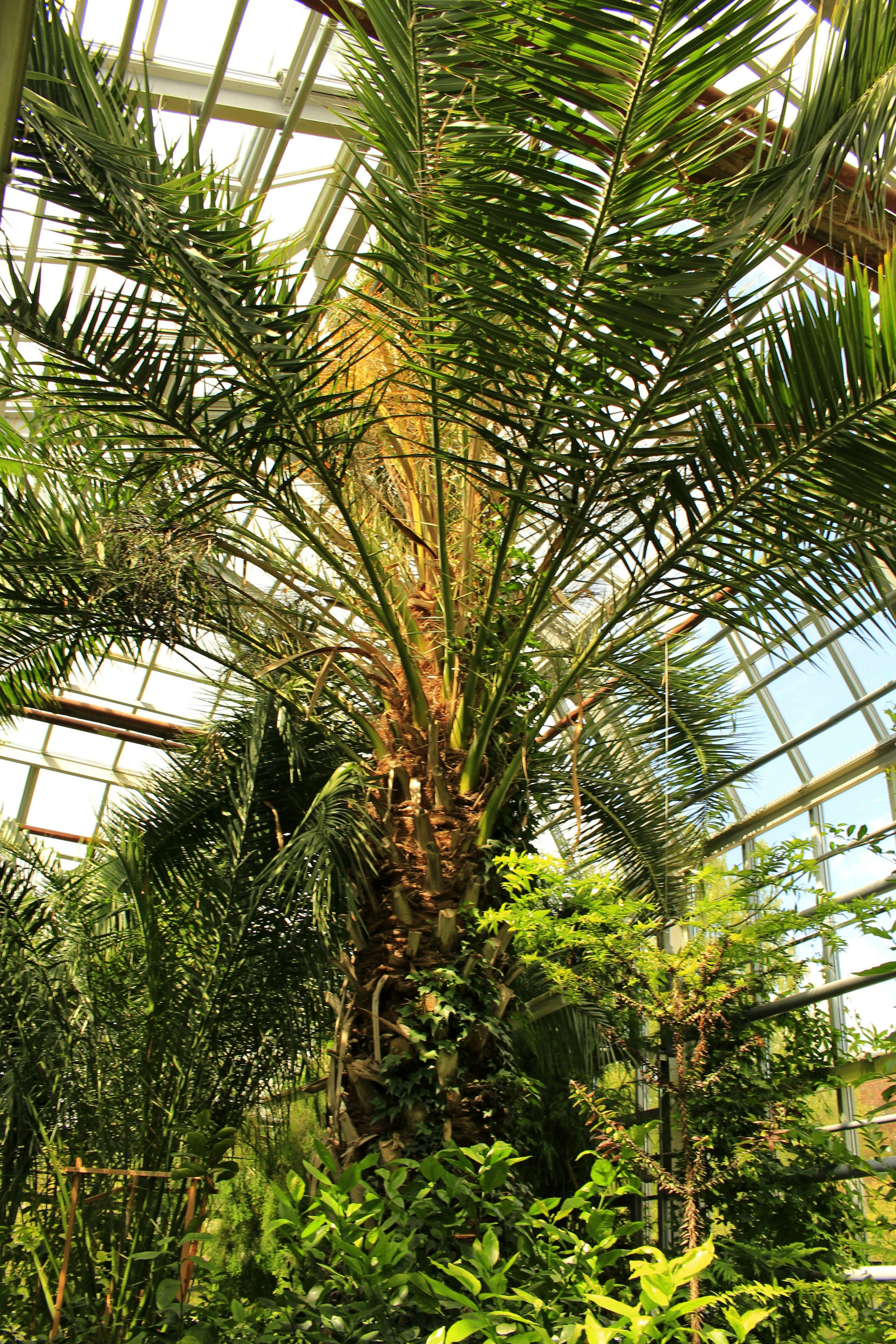
Inside the palm house

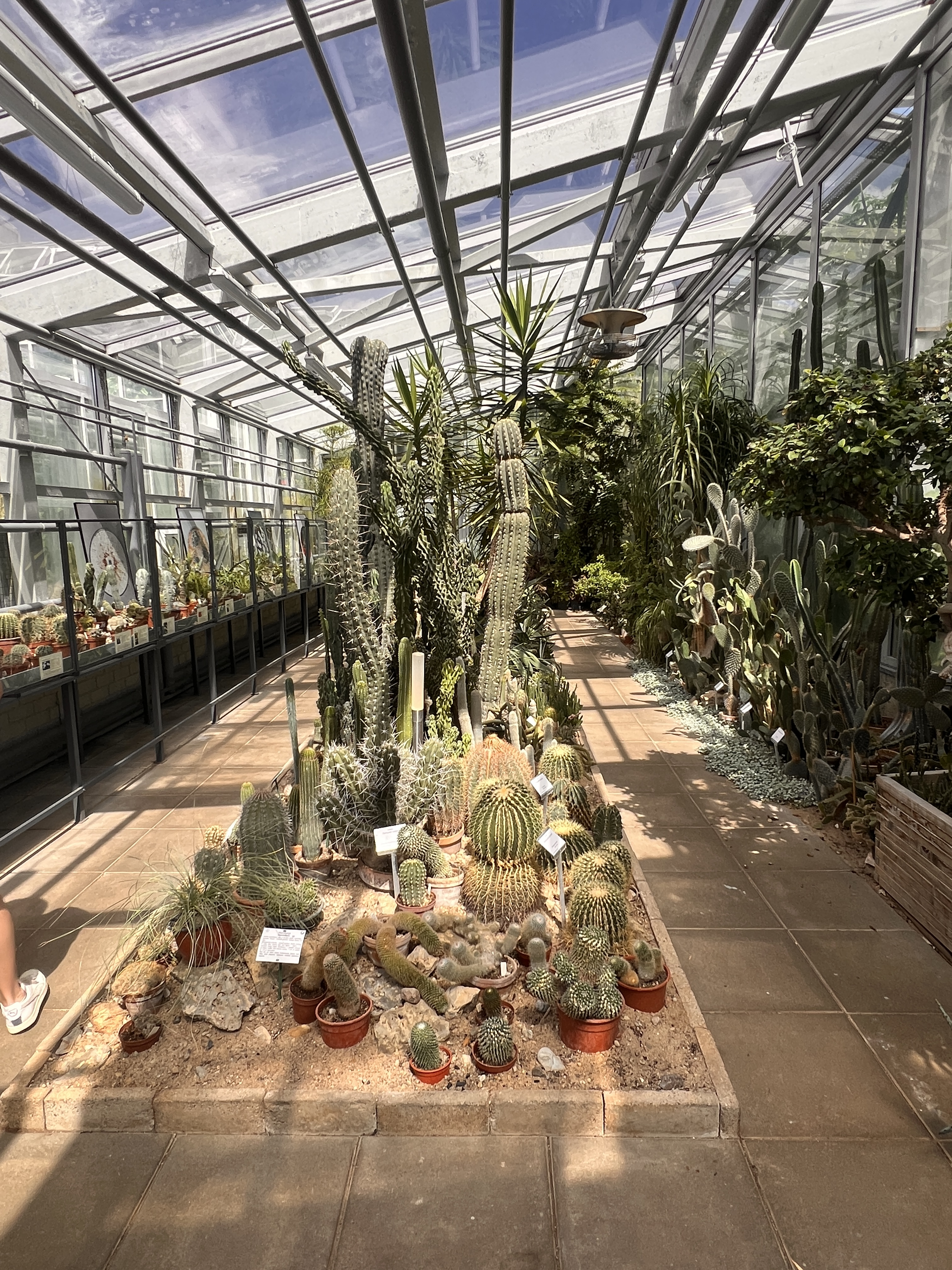
Cactus collection

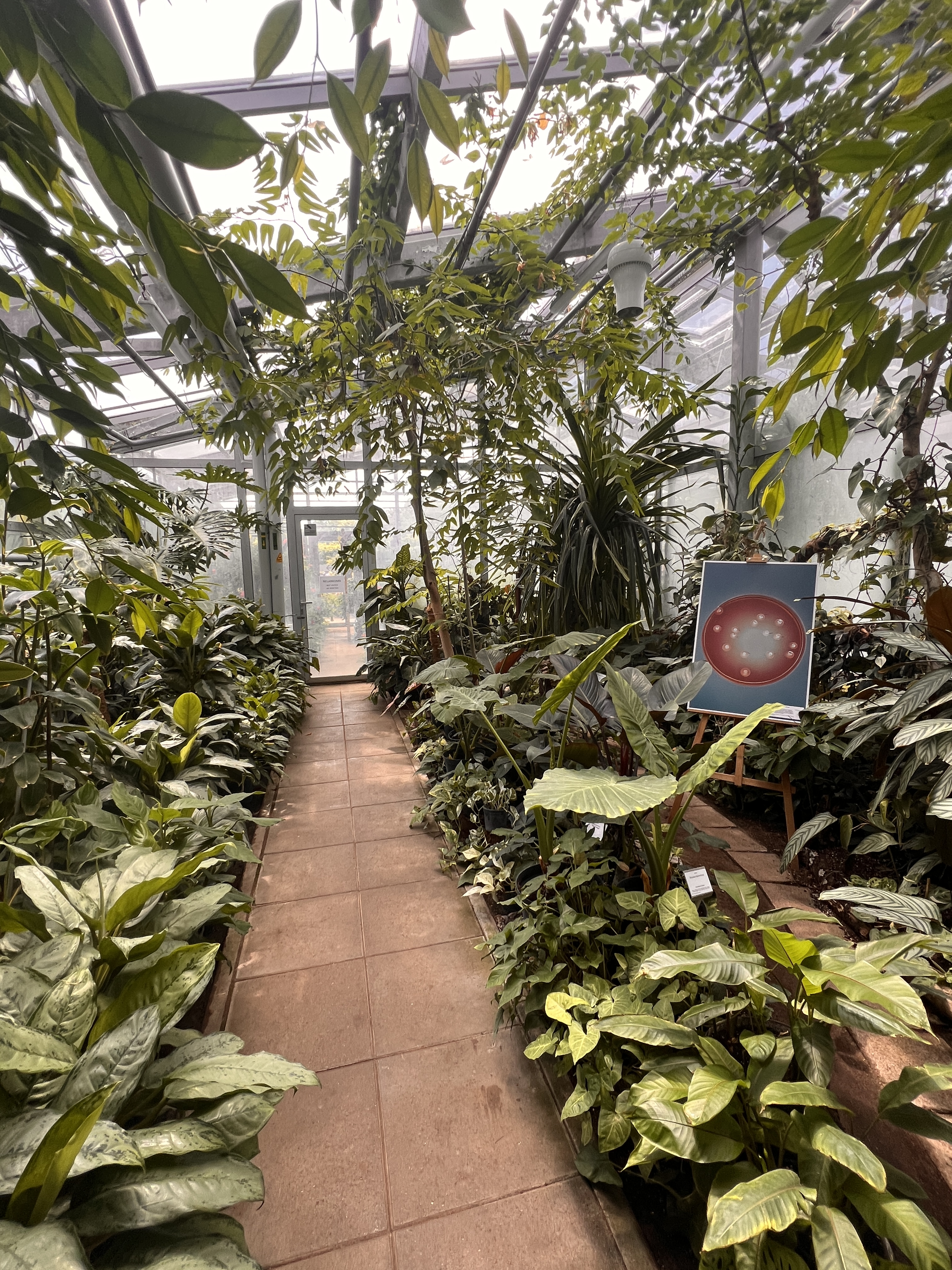
Inside the greenhouse
