= Kaunas Pantomime Theatre =

Theatre in Kaunas, Lithuania

Coordinates: 54°54′26″N 23°58′26″E

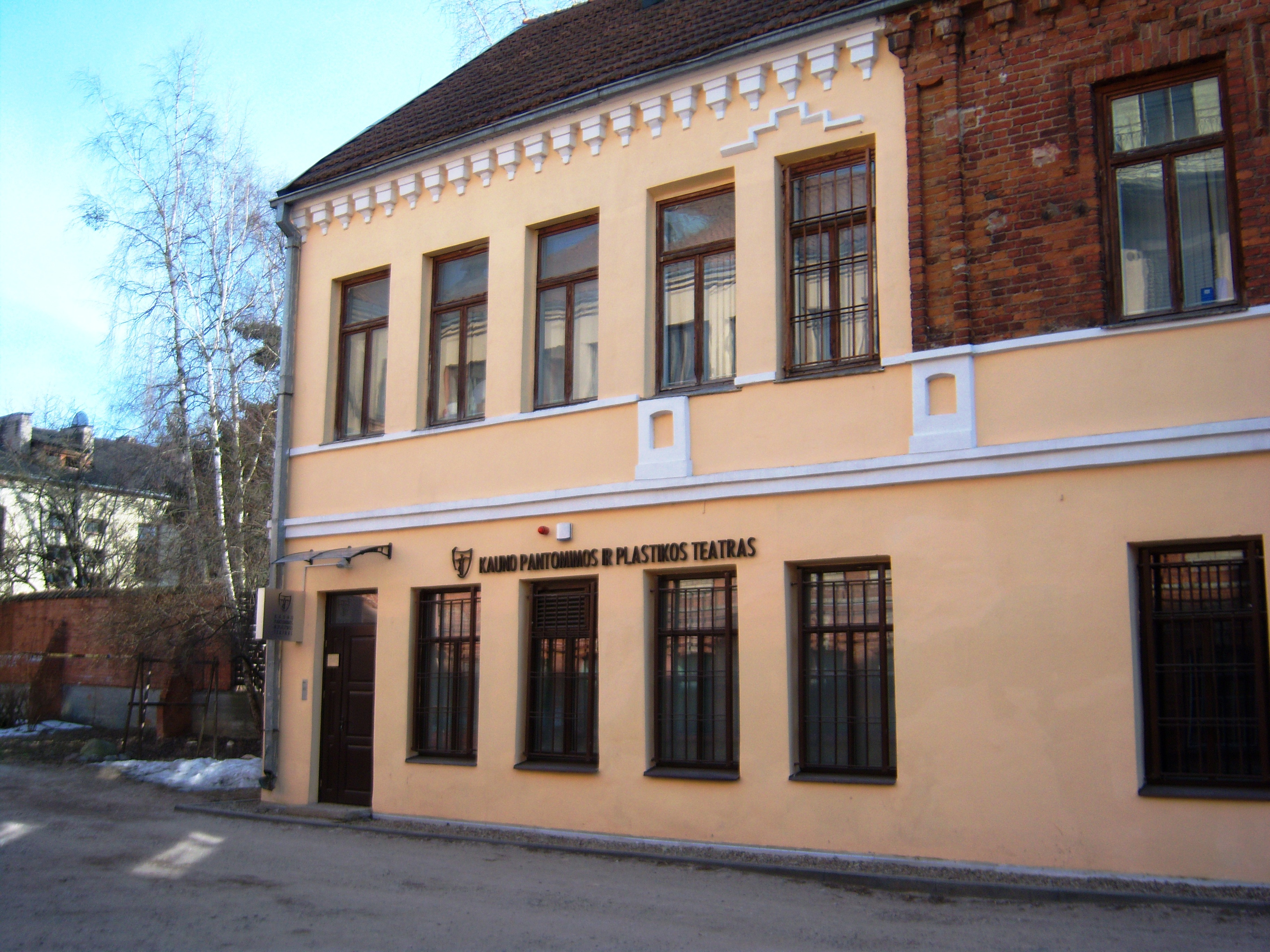
Theatre building in the Old Town

Kaunas pantomime theatre (Lithuanian: Kauno pantomimos teatras) is pantomime theatre in Kaunas, Lithuania. The theatre was established in 1968. Founder and leader of the Kaunas Pantomime theatre was artistic director Kestutis Adomaitis (1948–1996). Kaunas Municipality becomes the founder of Kaunas Pantomime Theatre in 2003. Kaunas Pantomime theatre is the only Lithuanian professional ensemble theatre with a repertoire of this genre only. The theatre performed in many foreign countries, such as Germany, Russia, Romania, Latvia, Syria, Jordan, China, Moldova, Ukraine, Belarus, Poland, and Denmark.
