= Kaunas State Puppet Theatre =

Puppet theatre in Kaunas, Lithuania

Coordinates: 54°53′49″N 23°54′25″E

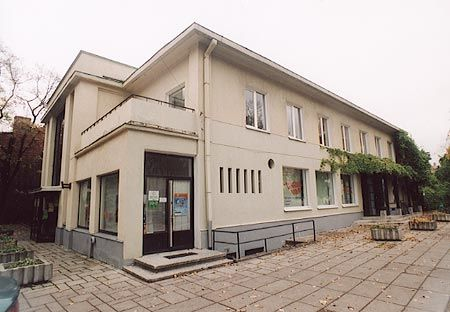
Kaunas State Puppet Theatre

Kaunas State Puppet Theatre (Lithuanian: Kauno valstybinis lėlių teatras) is a puppet theatre in Kaunas, Lithuania. The professional theatre was established in 1958. Each theatrical season it offers to the spectators twenty puppet performances, and 4–5 new plays are usually staged. There are two halls for spectators – 226 and 50 seats each in the theatre. Small museum of puppets characters is set at the premises of the theatre. The theatre performed plays in festivals of many foreign countries.
