= Konradas Cafe =

Konradas cafe
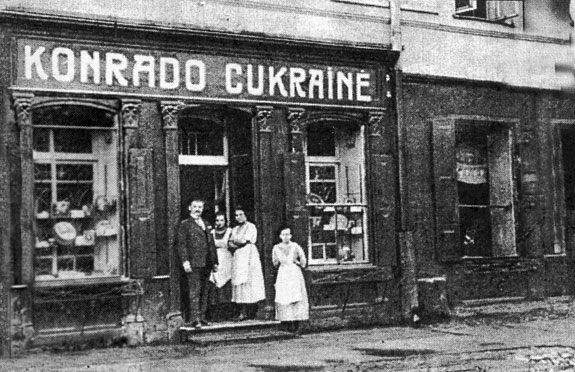
- Maksas Konradas (Max Conrad) (left) and waitresses in front of the Konradas sugar shop (Konrado cukrainė)
- Interactive map of Konradas cafe

Restaurant information
- Established: 1852
- Closed: 2003
- Location: Kaunas, (Laisvės Alėja 45), Lithuania

The Konradas cafe (Lithuanian: Konrado kavinė), later called Tulpė (lit. 'Tulip'), was a prominent Lithuanian interwar cafe located in Laisvės alėja, Kaunas. Analogous to the Café de la Rotonde and Zielony Balonik, the cafe was named after Maksas Konradas (Max Conrad), its owner. It was usually visited by intellectuals of the time, by mostly artists and writers.

== History ==
=== Russian Empire ===
Kaunas at that time was part of the Kovno Governorate of the Russian Empire. The two-story brick building was first built in 1850 by college secretary Aleksei Dubenkin. The architect of the Governorate – Theodor Helmholtz – supervised the construction. A sugar shop was opened on the first floor in 1852 by Richard Conrad, who was a German-born chairman of the Kaunas Bakers' Union from 1908 to 1913. The second floor was occupied by a governmental property institution. After ten years of service, in 1862 the sugar shop was replaced by a cafe. In 1864 the building was purchased by Šavelis Vainšteinas, a merchant who bought buildings, renovated them and rented them out. Between 1877 and 1890, new duplexes were added to both sides of the building. The buildings were rebuilt several times, until it was pawned by the Vilnius Land Bank in 1907. In 1908, according to property law, it was bought by Jankelis Žižmorskis and Rasia-Dveira Oržechovska, whose descendants owned the property until 1940.

=== Independent Lithuania ===
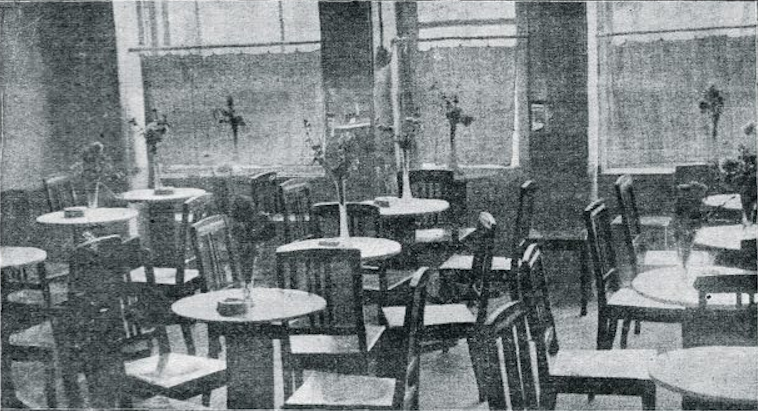
Konradas cafe in 1923

In 1920, part of the first floor was rented out by Richard Conrad's brothers Leonidas Konradas and Maksas Konradas, who established a cafe and sugar shop. At that time, the cafe had two rooms. Rooms in the building were also rented by Valentinas Stabačinskas's clothing and hat workshop, and the hotel "Kęstutis" (not to be confused with Agota Samulytė's hotel "Kęstutis", which operated since 1919) was located on the second floor. The cafe experienced its first reconstruction in 1923, during which new furniture was bought. In the courtyard of the building's first floor there was also a bakery and four-room apartment owned by Maksas Konradas. The yard also contained one more brick and one wooden one-story house with apartments and ice cream parlor. In 1931 the building was connected to the city's sewage system, after which the cafe experienced a mild room expansion. In 1933, the cafe went into bankruptcy and its owners changed. Another renovation occurred in 1936, where the cafe was expanded outside for the summer season.

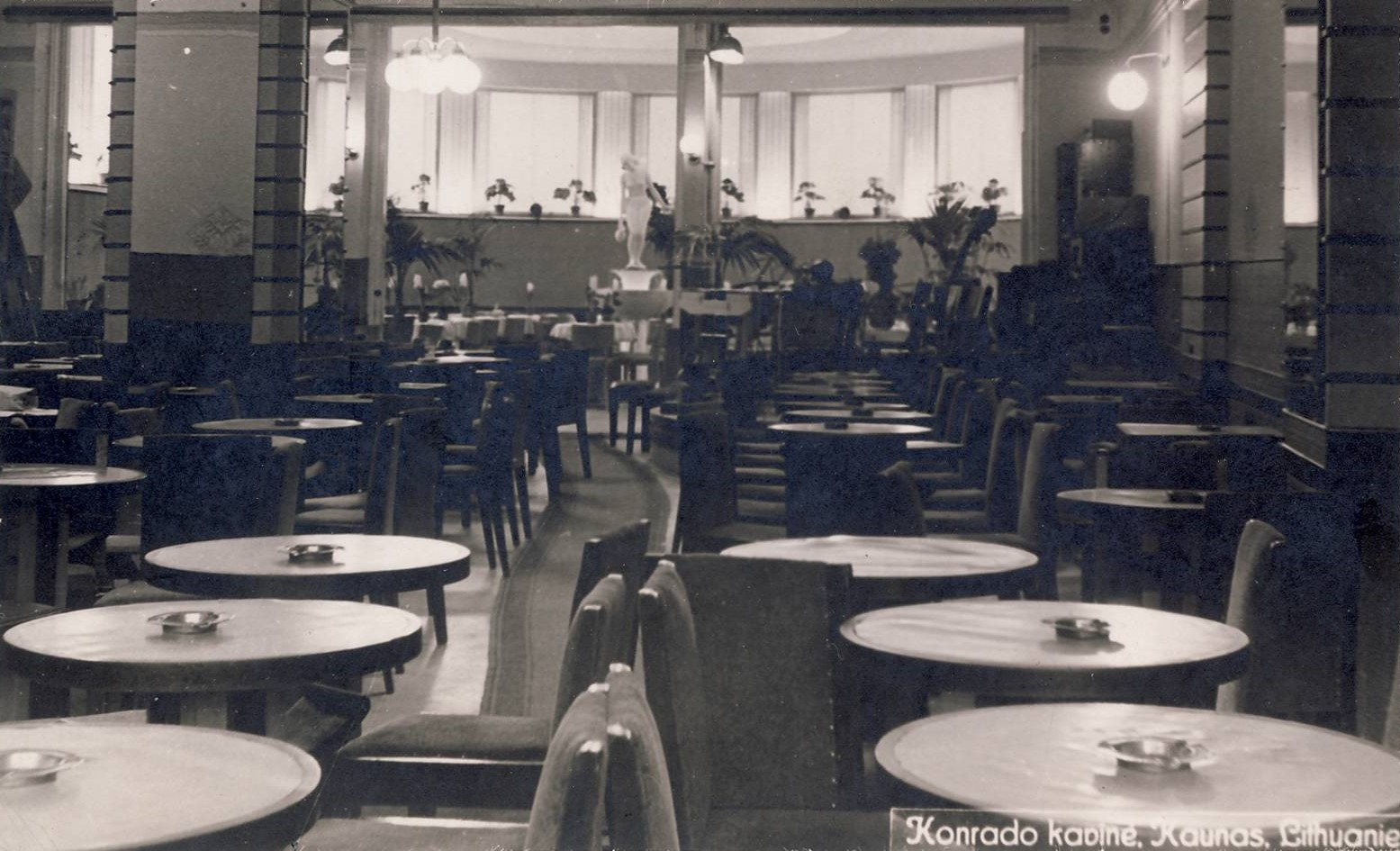
Interior of the Konradas cafe with Pundzius's plaster sculpture in the back

In 1938–1939 the cafe experienced another reconstruction, after which it received significant improvements to spacing and decoration, along with a plaster statue of a girl made by sculptor Bronius Pundzius. Visitors of the cafe often complained that the owners did not follow sanitation and hygiene standards; sometimes visitors would find "foreign objects" in the coffee and food products, although it is noted that some visitors themselves left something in their products in order to get a free coffee or cake. Additionally, in 1926 there arose problems due to the sugar shop's installation of an outlet filter and absorption well. The cafe did not have permission to sell alcoholic drinks except beer. Due to this, visitors of the cafe would go to other restaurants or places of entertainment during the evening.

In the beginning of 1940, the cafe was fined 6,000 Litai for the fact that it collected fees from visitors during the celebration of the five-year anniversary of the cafe's conductor Danielius Pomerancas and did not have a price list, and set the prices of some products higher than the orders of the price regulator allowed.

=== Soviet occupation ===
After the Second World War Lithuania was occupied by the Soviet Union and the cafe was renamed to Tulpė. The cafe subsequently lost its property of bringing together artistic celebrities. It underwent an interior redesign in 1948–1949 using Jonas Virakas's design. In 1961, Vytautas Jurgis Dičius and Algimantas Mikėnas redesigned the interior, with the rooms receiving another significant expansion. In 1986 a renovation contest was announced, which was won by architects Antanas Tarnauskas and Dalia Laurinatienė, as well as sculptor Vytautas Narutis.

== Cultural life ==
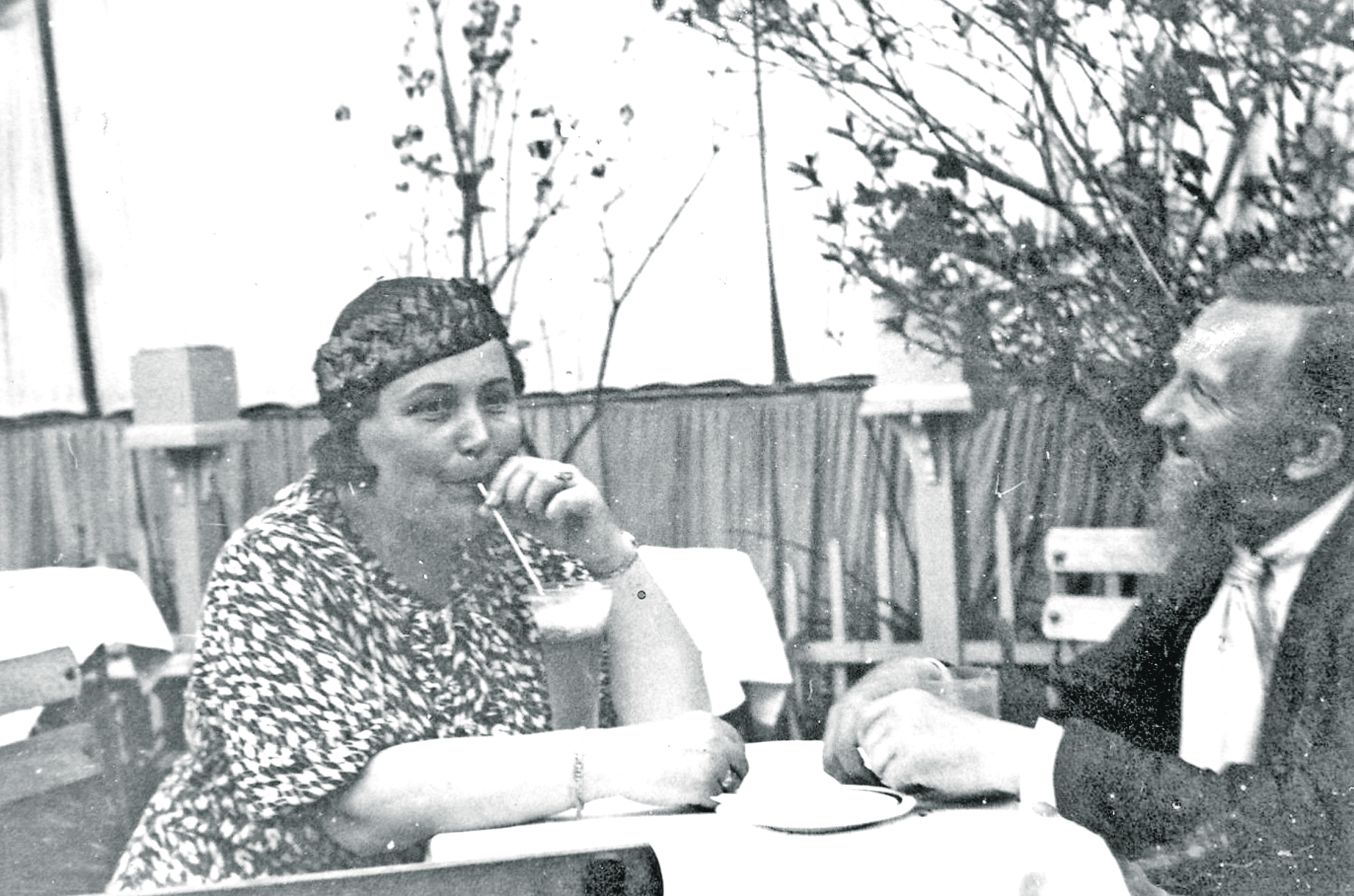
Liudas Gira with his wife in the Konradas cafe, 1930

People usually gathered at the cafe between 12 PM and 3 PM. The cafe was famous as a meeting place for the core of the Kaunas elite, artists, intellectuals, and influential public figures. As such it gained a more mystical reputation for being a space for only selected people to gather in, although casual visitors would also wander in, but mostly to see the "celebrities" visiting the place. Although the cafe was popular amongst many intellectuals, it was not profitable due to the visitors only ordering mostly coffee and cake, and for most of the time discussing with acquaintances rather than eating meals. Visitors would discuss daily news and government actions and exchange personal opinions. The cafe gave rise to the rural Lithuanian artistic society to develop their individualistic view of art, characteristic of the urban intellectuals. Although people made frequent acquaintances, no new artistic movement was born in the cafe. Other famous visitors of the cafe included Vincas Krėvė, Balys Sruoga, Juozas Keliuotas, Petras Cvirka, Liudas Truikys, Juozapas Albinas Herbačiauskas, and others.

Tables would often be known for being occupied by specific people, however the seats would be taken when the previous visitors would leave. The visitors of the cafe were very diverse and quite constant. People of different political opinions sat at different tables and avoided each other, although they would sometimes reciprocate or talk at their table as they passed. For example, representatives of left-leaning views or the "bohemians" avoided the nationalist Vytautas Alantas or writers and representatives of traditional literature, such as Balys Sruoga or Juozas Keliuotis. Only Petras Cvirka mixed among other people, although he preferred to choose the company of Antanas Venclova, Broniaus Raila, Kostas Korsakas and other like-minded artists and strongly spoke out against those who spread rumors about his favoring the nationalists. From Korsakas's wife, it is known that Korsakas himself would talk to Mykolas Žilinskas, a member of the Lithuanian Nationalist Union, to acquire some illegal press.

Michelis Hofmekleris's orchestra briefly played in the cafe, after which the orchestra was replaced by Danielius Pomerancas. The cafe had, among other necessities, wall mirrors, a Telefunken gramophone, and a Betting-model piano.

== Remembrance ==
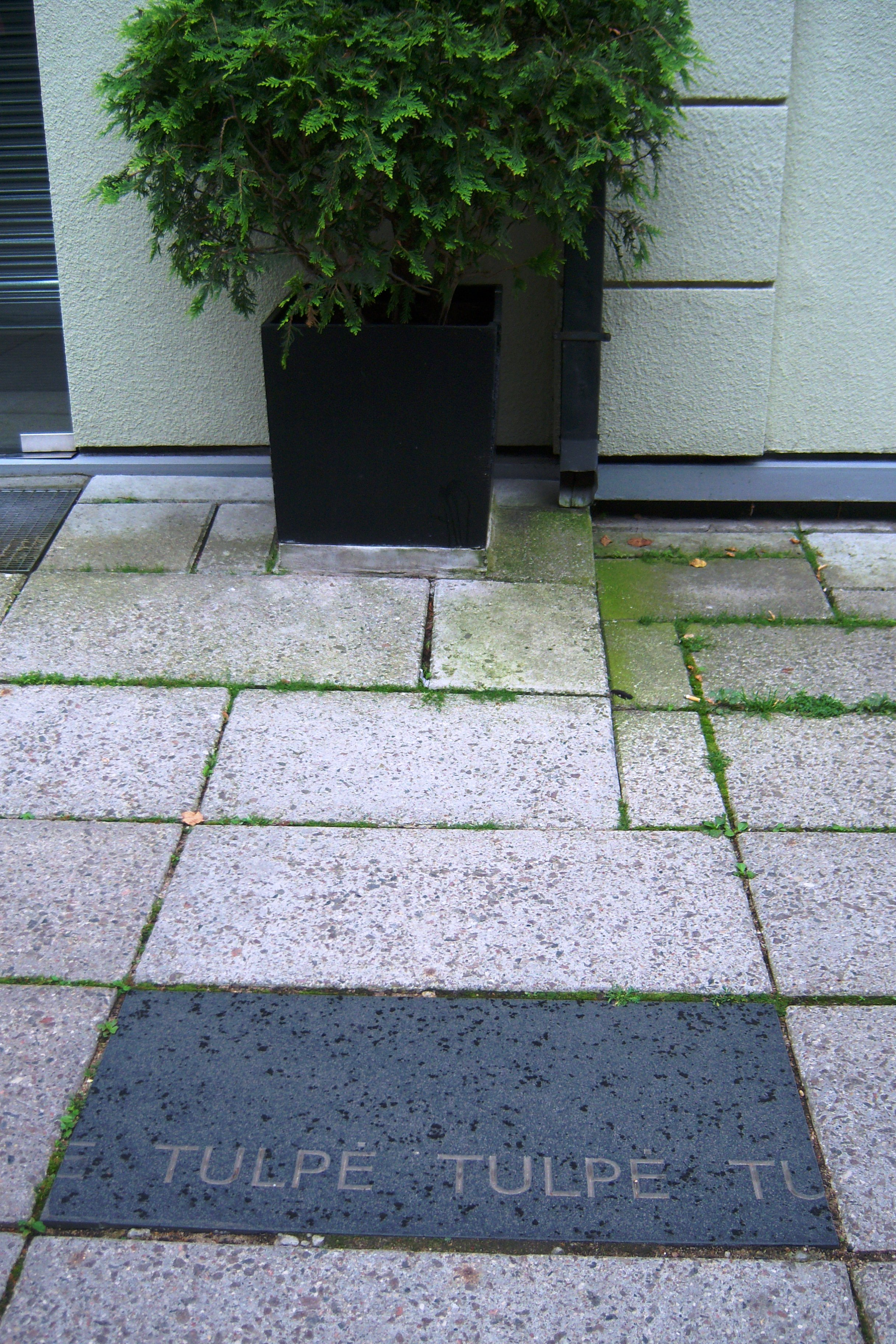
Former pavement tile engravement in memory of the cafe (2012)

The cafe was shut down and reorganized into a Mango clothing shop in 2003. The cafe's name was engraved in a pavement tile near the shop, although it was removed and safely preserved when laying new pavement in the alley in 2018–2019. According to the sculptor Stasys Žirgulis, after the disappearance Tulpė, the inhabitants of Kaunas fiercely criticized the then city government for allowing the destruction of the historic cafe.
