= Juozapas Albinas Herbačiauskas =

Lithuanian poet (1876–1944)

Juozapas Albinas Herbačiauskas Józef Albin Herbaczewski
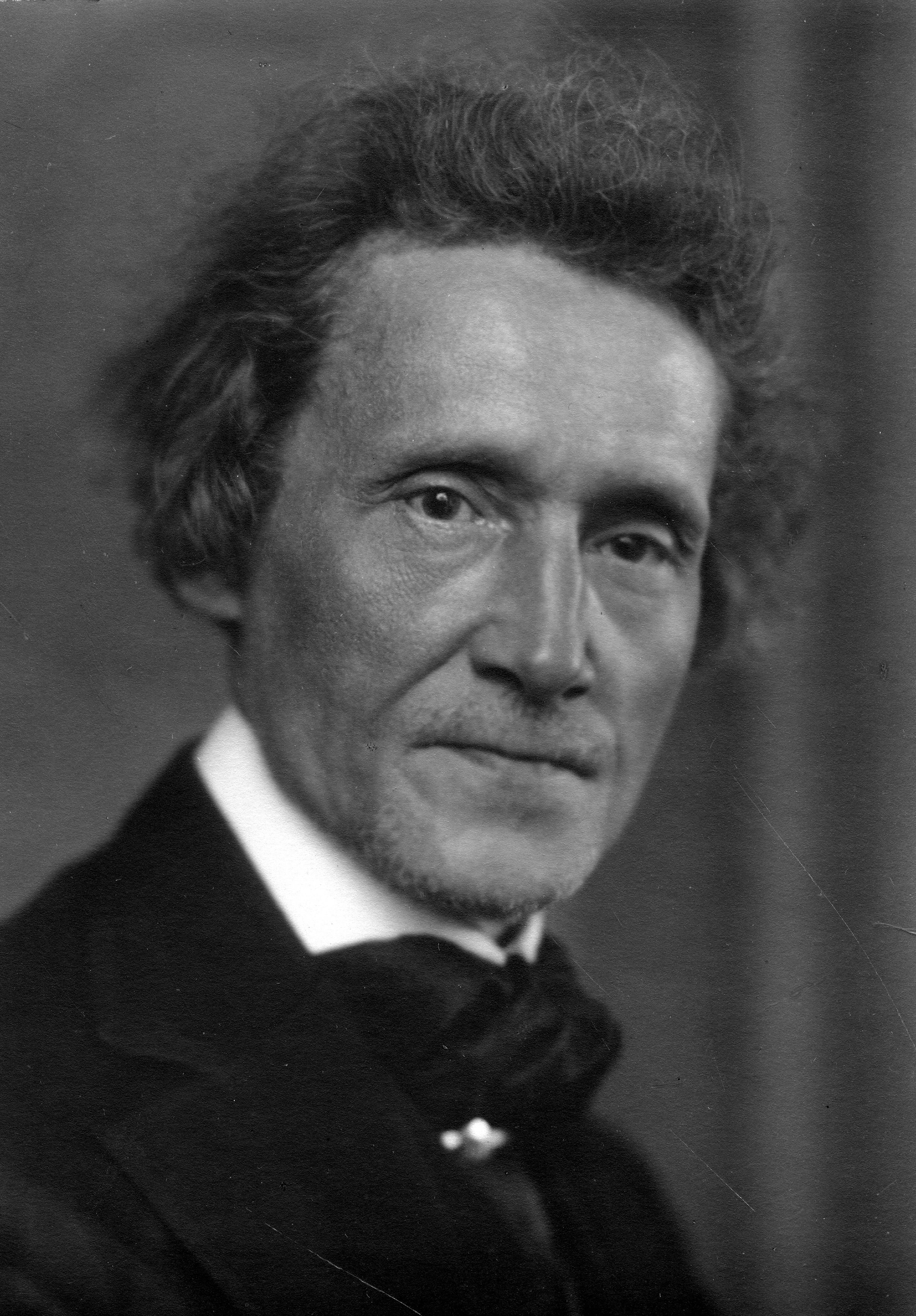
- Born: 20 October 1876; Lankeliškiai, Congress Poland, Russian Empire
- Died: 3 December 1944 (aged 68); Kraków, Nazi Germany
- Resting place: Rakowicki Cemetery
- Education: Jagiellonian University
- Occupations: Writer, poet, playwright, occultist, publicist, translator, literary critic
- Spouse: Teona Maria Jastrzębowska
- Relatives: Bolesław Szczęsny Herbaczewski (brother)
- Writing career
- Literary movement: Expressionism, modernism, occultism

Juozapas Albinas Herbačiauskas or Józef Albin Herbaczewski (20 October 1876 – 3 December 1944) was a Polish-Lithuanian occult writer, poet, literary critic, playwright, publicist and translator. Described as modernist and expressionist in style, Herbačiauskas was one of the pioneers of the essay in Lithuanian literature.

== Biography ==
=== Early life ===
Juozas Albinas Herbačiauskas was born on 20 October 1876 in the village of Lankeliškiai (modern-day Vilkaviškis district) in Congress Poland within the Russian Empire. His father, Kajetonas Herbačiauskas (also spelled Gerbačiauskas, Garbukas) was probably a Polish sacristan. His mother, Marija Magdalena Herbačiauskienė née Linkaitė, was a descendant of the noble Gedgaudai family from Samogitia. Herbačiauskas's family were nobility who originally hailed from Belarus, migrating to the area of Prienai; their nobility status was confirmed on 14 November 1822. Herbačiauskas was a second cousin to Jonas Basanavičius. Herbačiauskas's brother Bolesław Szczęsny Herbaczewski also became a writer, and studied in Warsaw with Mikalojus Konstantinas Čiurlionis, but considered himself Polish.

=== Studies ===
Herbačiauskas attended the Marijampolė Gymnasium, where he was expelled in 1894 for collecting Lithuanian language literature and possessing a Lithuanian calendar, which were prohibited by the Russian government. Mykolas Biržiška notes that Herbačiauskas's father was caught with a calendar with Polish characters (Latin characters were prohibited since the January Uprising), but Herbačiauskas himself took the blame. To avoid persecution and arrest by the Russian police, Herbačiauskas moved to Poland. First to Warsaw, but later crossed the border with Austria-Hungary and settled in Kraków. From 1901 to 1906, Herbačiauskas attended lectures at the Jagiellonian University.

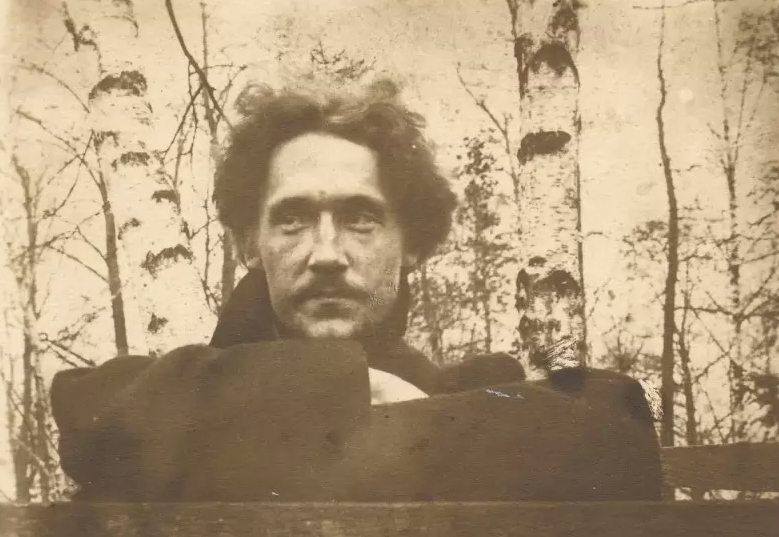
Herbačiauskas in Krakow, c. 1906

=== Career ===
Herbačiauskas studied in Kraków, and later in Italy and Czechia. For some time he lived in a manor in Klampučiai. Herbačiauskas belonged to the Slavic Club in Kraków, led by Marian Zdziechowski. In 1904 in Kraków, he and Adomas Varnas established the Rūta Cultural Society (not to be confused with the Vilnius-based Rūta Society), which attracted some Polish intellectuals as well as Lithuanian student artists, writers, and musicians. Herbačiauskas closely worked with the Young Poland (Młoda Polska) movement. He regularly recited poems at the Zielony Balonik cabaret, where he met people like Petras Rimša, Sofija Kymantaitė-Čiurlionienė, and Józef Piłsudski. Herbačiauskas personally knew Piłsudski as well as the Lithuanian president Antanas Smetona. At Zielony Balonik, Herbačiauskas also met Michał Römer and introduced him to his collection of Lithuanian national revival periodicals, encouraging Römer to write the first professional study on the Lithuanian national revival for Polish readers. Herbačiauskas considered himself a herald of the Lithuanian cause among the Poles, which was expressed in his work Odrodzenie Litwy wobec idei polskiej (Lithuanian Revival and the Idea of Poland) of 1905.

In 1907, Herbačiauskas established and was the editor of the Gabija almanac, an almanac dedicated to the memory of Antanas Baranauskas. The almanac's most important publications were Genijaus meilė (Love of the Genius) and Lietuvos griuvėsių himnas (Hymn of the Ruins of Lithuania). From 1911 to 1924, he lectured on the Lithuanian language at Jagiellonian University. Here he often exchanged letters with Jonas Basnavičius, the Vileišiai brothers and other intellectuals of that time.

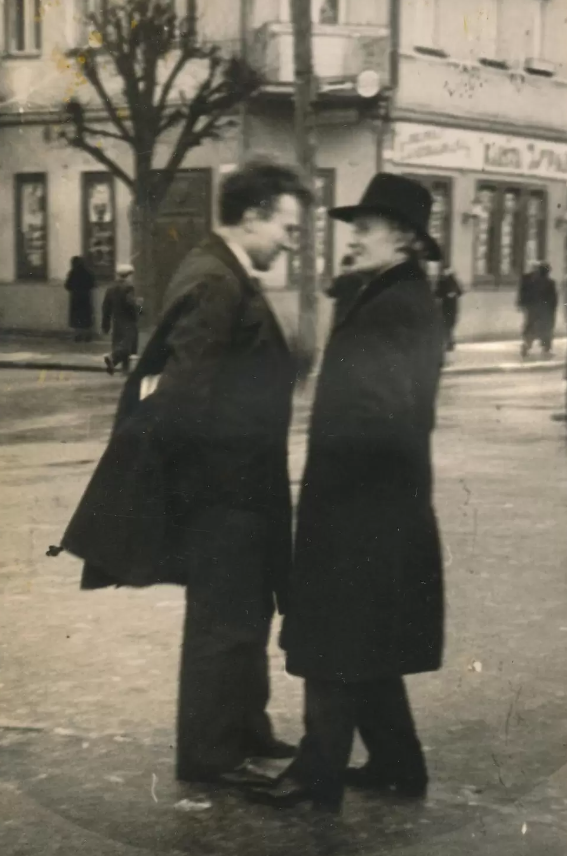
Jonas Marcinkevičius (left) and Herbačiauskas in Kaunas, 1924

In 1919-1920, he was in Vilnius and Kaunas mediating in Polish–Lithuanian negotiations on behalf of Józef Piłsudski and Leon Wasilewski. At the time, Herbačiauskas supported the idea of a union or federation of the two countries. Nothing came of the talks, and the conflict over Vilnius Region between the two countries only deepened. Herbačiauskas expressed his disappointment in a number of works: Kur eini, lietuvi? (Where are you going, Lithuanian?, 1919), Rozważania na czasie (Timely Considerations, 1921), and O Wilno i nie tylko o Wilno (About Vilnius and Not Only About Vilnius, 1922).

He returned to Lithuania by the invitation of Balys Sruoga and Vincas Krėvė-Mickevičius as an already established author and occultist. Especially since his writings of the time seemed suspicious to many and he faced accusations of disloyalty to the Polish state. Herbačiauskas titled himself the "ambassador of the kingdom of the dead", and it is said that he prophesized the Second World War. In Lithuania, Herbačiauskas worked with newspapers such as Baras, Gaisai, Aušrinė, Lietuvos žinios, and Naujoji Romuva. A staunch anti-communist, he actively visited the Konradas cafe, an artist and writers' cafe situated in Laisvės Alėja in Kaunas, then the capital of Lithuania. Herbačiauskas would discuss literature and politics with Balys Sruoga, Vincas Krėvė-Mickevičius, Juozas Keliuotis, Petras Karuža, and Paulius Galaunė. In 1928, Vincas Mykolaitis-Putinas wrote of Herbačiauskas in the article entitled "At the Entrance of New Lithuanian Literature": "I dare to think that Herbačiauskas, as then, as well as until now, will have captured all the most sensitive matters of our cultural life in his strange-toned writings, even such, which did not reach public opinion and public consciousness".

=== Later years ===
From 1923 to 1932, he lectured on the Polish language in the Vytautas Magnus University. Students remembered Herbačiauskas as a passionate orator. After lectures, Herbačiauskas would dim the lights and begin to tell fortunes – illuminated by candlelight, Herbačiauskas "resembled an ancient sorcerer", who would "take a student's hand with his thin, long-fingered hand and talk about future joys and sorrows". After a quarrel with the university's administration, Herbačiauskas was accused of demoralizing the youth, and subsequently awarded a pension of 320 litai. His trips to Poland and contacts with Polish politicians in 1927 and 1928 also raised suspicions. In 1933, Herbačiauskas and his wife moved to Poland, as Polish Minister of Foreign Affairs Józef Beck invited him to give lectures on Lithuania at the University of Warsaw. He lived in Warsaw up until 1943. It is said that when the city was bombarded, all of the local blocks except Herbačiauskas's were destroyed.

Herbačiauskas died on 3 December 1944 at the Helcel Nursing Home in Kraków. He was buried in Rakowicki Cemetery.

== Writing ==
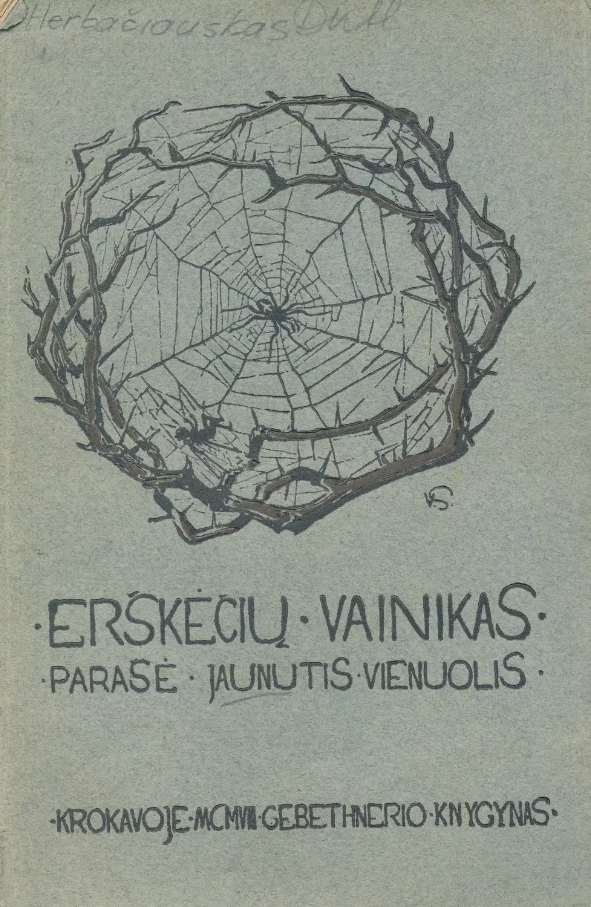
Cover of Erškėčių vainikas, 1908

He signed his early work with the pseudonym Jaunutis Vienuolis. Herbačiauskas's work is characterized by literary modernism, individualism, prophetic visions, and aphoristic language. In Odrodzenie Litwy wobec idei polskiej (Lithuanian Revival and the Idea of Poland; 1905) and Erškėčių vainikas (Crown of Thorns; 1908) Herbačiauskas explored the development of Lithuanian culture, critiquing its provincialist isolation, and reflecting on the religious and national aspects of creativity, as well as the mission of the artist, which he deemed to be a rebel and genius on Earth.

Published in 1906, the drama Potępienie (Condemnation) was a manifestation of the medieval mysticism characteristic of Young Poland. Published in 1911, the book I nie wódź nas na pokuszenie… (And Lead Us Not Into Temptation...) was a symbol of the author's conversion to Christianity. In 1912, he published the work Głos bólu (Voice of pain), in which he summarized the development of the Lithuanian national movement, condemned the nationalist activities of the Polish and Lithuanian clergy, and called for a joint struggle for liberation. His next book, Ironiczna nauka dla umysłowo dojrzałych dzieci (Ironic Lessons for Mentally Mature Children, 1914), was a presentation of the author's concept of literature, as well as a critique of contemporary Polish literature – particularly the work of Tadeusz Miciński, with whom Herbačiauskas was in long-standing conflict, but also of Stanisław Wyspiański, Stefan Żeromski, and Stanisław Brzozowski.

While in Kaunas he published a popular book of essays Dievo šypsenos (Smiles of God, 1929), and drama Tyrų vienuolis (The Monk of the Wilderness, 1930).

Genijaus meilė was a literary study written in metaphorical language imitating the style of Friedrich Nietzsche. It can be considered the first attempt to outline the aesthetic principles of Lithuanian modernism. In it, Herbačiauskas announces the problem of the nation's spirit, the future salvation of Lithuania, which will be brought by a genius – a "creator of the highest abilities". In Lietuvos griuvėsių himnas Herbačiauskas depicts a medieval poem in which the forces of the natural and supernatural worlds meet, and where the action is accompanied by a chorus.

== Family ==
About 1900, Herbačiauskas married Teona Maria Jastrzębowska, daughter of Władysław Jastrzębowski, a January Uprising fighter and illustrator, and Franciszka Teona née Stawecka. Jastrzębowska's grandfathers were Wojciech Jastrzębowski, a botanist, inventor and participant in the November Uprising, and Edward Michał Stawecki, publisher and participant in the Hungarian Revolution of 1848 and the January Uprising. Jastrzębowska's brother was Wojciech Jastrzębowski, a sculptor, soldier of the Polish Legions, who fought against the Bolsheviks and Ukrainians, in the interwar period rector of the Academy of Fine Arts in Warsaw and a senator. Their sister was Stefania Maria Jastrzębowska "Okrzejowa", a member of the Polish Military Organization attached to the 1st Brigade of the Polish Legions, she died tragically in Lublin on 14 April 1919.

Herbačiauskas' brother Boleslaw Szczęsny Herbaczewski (1875–1943) was a writer and official in the Polish administration. In 1919, during the period of the Polish-Lithuanian fighting and the Sejny uprising, he served as starosta of Sejny.

== Bibliography ==
- Vaitkevičiūtė, Eugenija (2023). "Identity at the Crossroads of Cultures: The Case of the Bilingual Writer Juozapas Albinas Herbačiauskas". Trimarium. The History and Literature of Central and Eastern European Countries. 2.
