= Siege of Kaunas (1362) =

1362 battle of the Lithuanian Crusade

- Part of the Lithuanian Crusade
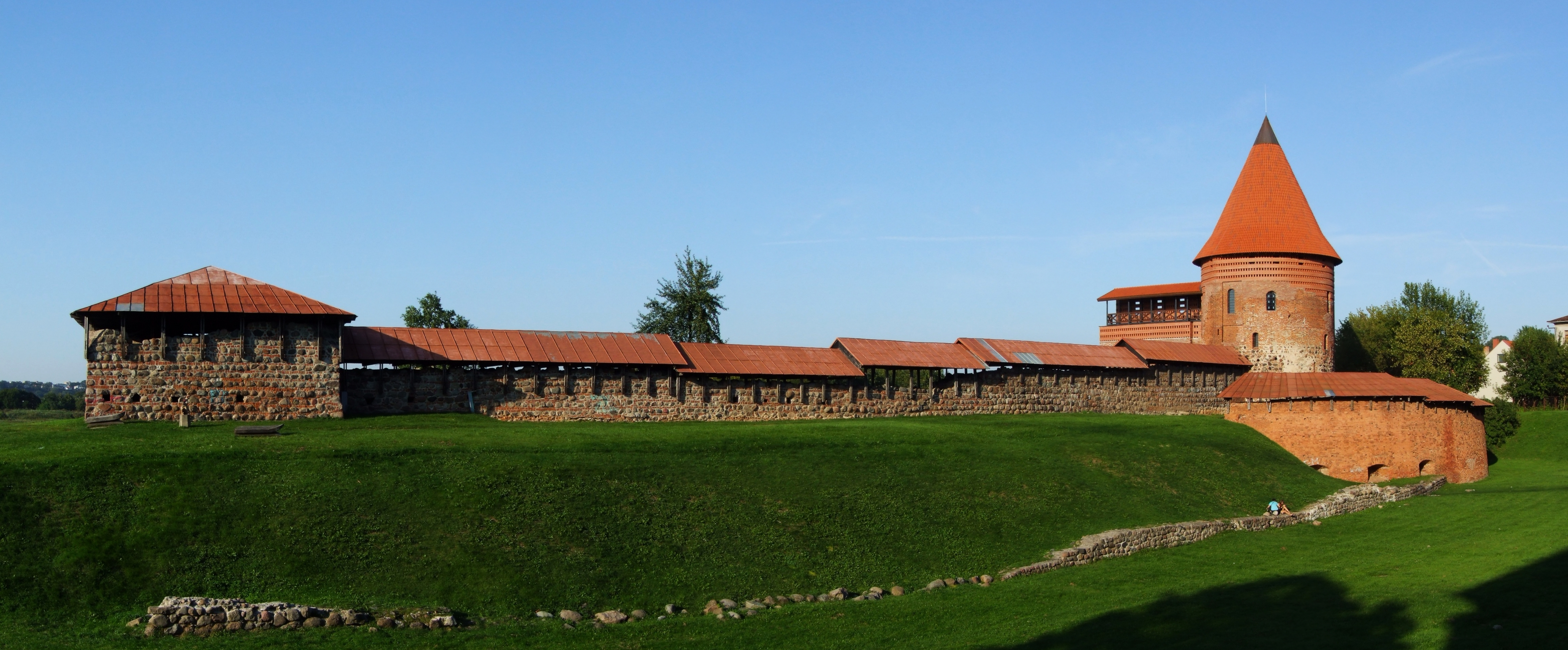
- Remains of Kaunas Castle in 2012
Date	March 13 – April 17, 1362
Location	Kaunas Castle 54°53′56″N 23°53′6″E
Result	Teutonic victory

Belligerents
Grand Duchy of Lithuania	Teutonic Order; Livonian Order

Commanders and leaders
Vaidotas (POW)	Winrich von Kniprode

Casualties and losses
350 dead; 37 taken captive	Unknown

The siege of Kaunas was laid by the Teutonic Order on the newly built Kaunas Castle in spring 1362. It was the first brick castle built by the Grand Duchy of Lithuania. After a month-long siege, the castle was captured and destroyed. Its commander Vaidotas, son of Kęstutis, and 36 others were taken captive. The defeat, followed by the destruction of Veliuona and Pieštvė the following year, severely weakened Lithuanian defenses along the Neman River and opened central Lithuania to Teutonic attacks.

== Background ==
The Teutonic Order waged a decades-long crusade against the pagan Grand Duchy of Lithuania in attempts to conquer it and forcibly convert it to Christianity. The Neman River became the natural frontier and each side built a network of castles and fortresses along its banks. Lithuanian fortresses were wooden (Kolainiai, Veliuona, Pieštvė, Paštuva, Bisenė) until they began building stone and red brick Kaunas Castle near the confluence of the Neman and Neris Rivers.

== Siege ==
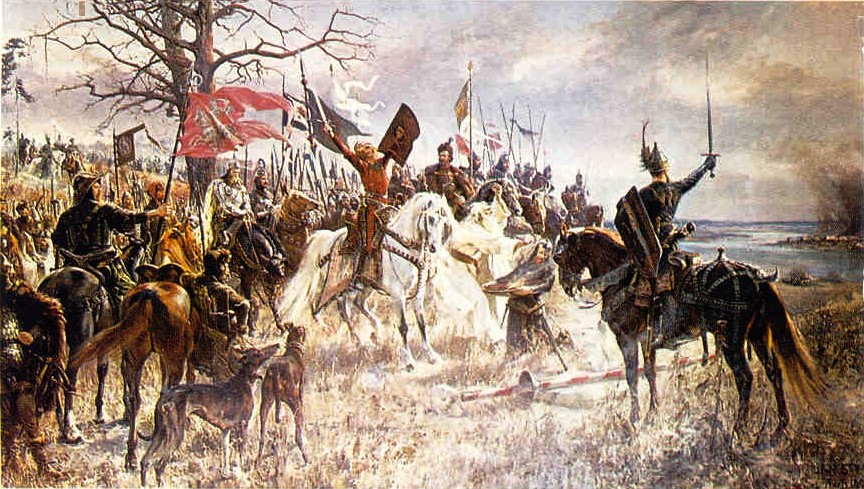
Oath of Vytautas the Great, Grand Duke of Lithuania, by ruined Kaunas Castle in 1362 by Jan Styka (1901) is not historically accurate as Vytautas was a young child at the time of the siege

In 1361, the Order sent brother Henry of Schöningen on a reconnaissance mission to find out the size of the new castle so that an effective siege could be organized the next winter. That became the first mention of Kaunas Castle in written sources; the town of Kaunas was mentioned only in 1384. In spring 1362, the Order organized a large campaign with crusaders from England, Italy, Germany, and elsewhere. They sailed up the Neman, quietly bypassing Lithuanian fortresses, and disembarked below Kaunas. For two days they built bridges and reached the castle on March 13.

The Order dug trenches, built ramparts, and filled the moat with dirt. To protect themselves from Lithuanian attack, the Teutons dug a canal connecting Neman and Neris, thus cutting off the castle from the mainland. They also built siege towers and trebuchets and managed to destroy two corner towers. The defense was organized by Vaidotas, son of Kęstutis. The defenders shot arrows, pushed away siege engines, and even managed to build a tower by Neris and fire arrows upon the invaders. This tower was quickly destroyed and pulled down into the river. The knights kept pounding the outer walls provoking the defenders out of the inner walls. The weakened outer wall collapsed, burying many defenders and attackers. The Order continued attacking and destroying inner walls, but defenders would quickly repair the damage.

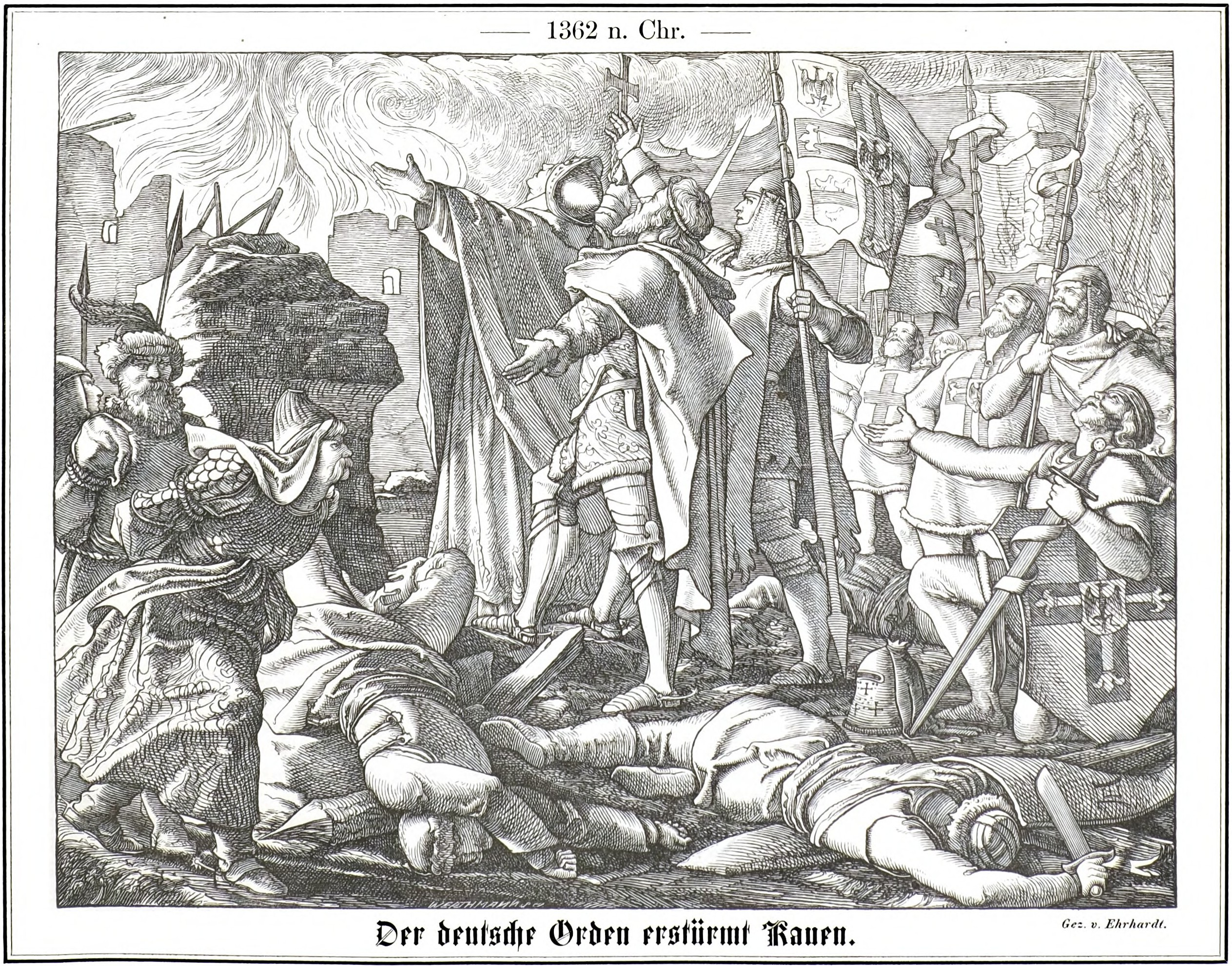
"Der deutsche Orden erstürmt Kauen". "The German Order [Teutonic Order] storms Kauen [an older German name for Kaunas]". Adolf Ehrhardt's 19th century depiction of the Teutonic Order's victory at Kaunas.

On April 10, the Order received reinforcements from the Livonian Order and surrounded the castle on all sides. They succeeded in making a gap in the wall, but defenders stubbornly resisted. Kęstutis attempted to negotiate with Grand Master Winrich von Kniprode to no avail. Eventually, the inner wall collapsed, but defenders continued to resist. The attackers threw burning resin and wood soaked in sap, lighting inner wooden structures on fire. Remaining defenders attempted to break through, but Vaidotas and 36 men were captured. The castle fell on April 17, Holy Saturday. Wigand of Marburg's Chronica nova Prutenica (New Prussian Chronicle) reports that the Teutonic army sang "Christ ist erstanden" after overcoming the pagan Lithuanian defenders.

== Aftermath ==
The Teutons did not attempt to establish themselves in Kaunas and sailed back to Prussia on April 18, 1362. The Lithuanians hurried to rebuild. They chose Vyrgalė island at the mouth of Nevėžis, about 7 km (4.3 mi) below Kaunas. This New Kaunas was destroyed in April 1363 along with Veliuona and Pieštvė. This severely weakened Lithuanian defenses along the Neman and started the most intense period of attacks towards central Lithuania, including Vilnius and Trakai. Kaunas Castle was rebuilt in 1368 on the foundations of the first inner wall.
