= Pieštvė =

Wooden fortress of the Grand Duchy of Lithuania

- Seredžius, Lithuania
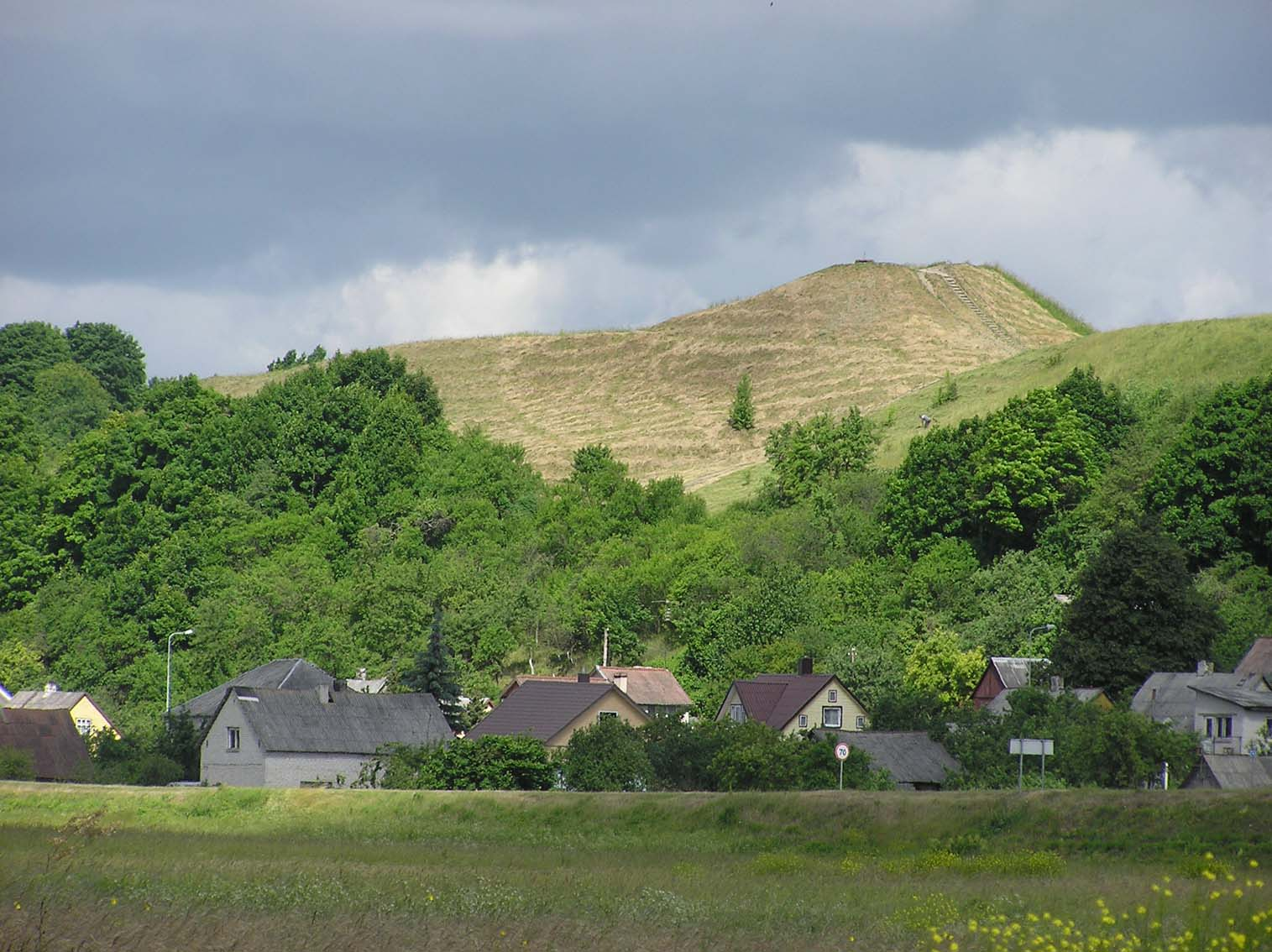
- Palemon Hill above Seredžius

Site information
- Type: Hill fort

Location
- Coordinates: 55°4′48″N 23°24′23″E

Site history
- Built: Built before 1293; Rebuilt in 1412
- Built by: Grand Duchy of Lithuania
- Materials: Wood, earthworks
- Fate: Burned down in 1363; Abandoned after 1422
- Battles/wars: 1293, 1298, 1318, 1319, 1322, 1363
- Events: Lithuanian Crusade

Pieštvė (also known as Beisten, Bisten, Pistene, Pista, Pestwa, etc. in medieval chronicles) was a wooden fortress of the Grand Duchy of Lithuania during the Lithuanian Crusade. It stood on a hill fort that is known as Palemon Hill in Seredžius, Jurbarkas District Municipality, Lithuania, located near the confluence of the Neman and Dubysa rivers. It was an important Lithuanian defensive outpost against the Teutonic Order. It was first mentioned in written sources in 1293 and attacked numerous times by the Order. Because it stood near Junigeda (Veliuona), both fortresses were often attacked together. It was burned down in 1363, a year following the fall of Kaunas Castle. It was rebuilt in May 1412 but lost its strategic importance after the Treaty of Melno (1422) and was abandoned. Earlier historians thought that Pieštvė was identical to Bisena.

== History ==
=== Pre-history and legends ===
Archaeological excavations show that people lived on and around the hill fort long before the Teutonic crusade. A burial ground from the 7th century is located about 500 m (1,600 ft) southeast of the hill; it was excavated in the 1980s. At the foot of the hill, towards east and west, there was a settlement from the beginning of the 1st millennium CE to the beginning of the 2nd millennium that covers an area of about 1.5 hectares (3.7 acres).

The 16th-century Lithuanian Chronicles recorded the legend of Lithuanian origin from noble refugees of the Roman Empire. According to the legend, Palemon and his entourage sailed up the Neman River until the mouth of Dubysa. There they saw a tall hill and decided to build the "New Rome". The legends became popular and the hill, where once Pieštvė stood, became known as the Palemon Hill. The historical name was preserved by Pieštvė, a small rivulet that flows by the hill into the Neman, and Peštvėnai, a former village located about 2 km (1.2 mi) north of Seredžius.

Local tradition holds that the hill is a sacred place known as Place of Perkūnas which could indicate that it was once a place of worship in Lithuanian mythology.

=== Lithuanian Crusade ===
Pieštvė fortress was first mentioned in the chronicle of Peter of Dusburg on 25 July 1293 when the Teutonic Order organized an attack on Pieštvė and nearby Junigeda (Veliuona). At the time, the Teutons burned the outer bailey but did not manage to take the inner fortification. The following year, three Teutonic brothers raided near the fortress, took an entire herd of cattle and 70 people as slaves back to Prussia. The Teutons attacked both Pieštvė and Junigeda and managed to burn their outer baileys in 1298 (commanded by Kunon, komtur of Brandenburg) and fall 1318 (commanded by Marshal Heinrich von Plötzke). The 1318 loss was particularly upsetting because the Lithuanians lost that year's harvest stored in the burned buildings. The Knights tried again in April 1319, but the attackers lacked discipline and the Lithuanians were prepared as they received a warning.

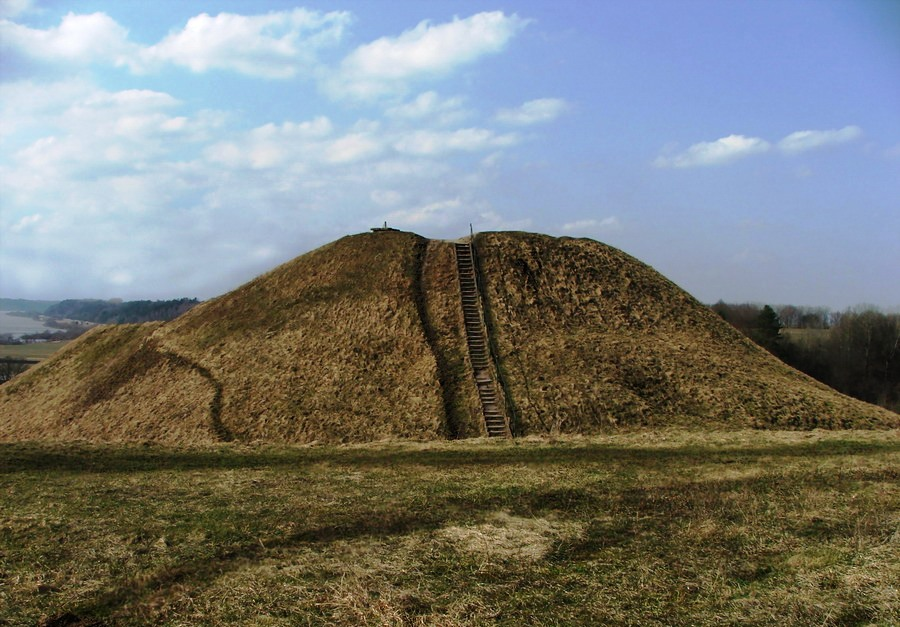
On the Palemon Hill

In February 1322, Pieštvė was attacked by a large Teutonic force, reinforced by guest crusaders from Western Europe. On the second day of the attack, the defenders offered hostages and agreed to surrender. In 1336, after the victory at Pilėnai, the Teutons started building a fortress on Romainiai Island in the Neman between Pieštvė and Junigeda. This fortress, known as Marienburg, was quickly destroyed by the Lithuanians. The next year, many European knights, including Henry XIV, Duke of Bavaria and nobles from Burgundy and Piedmont, arrived for the crusade. They constructed Bayernburg, named in Henry's honor, and likely rebuilt Marienburg. However, Marienburg was not mentioned in further historical sources and, therefore, it was either quickly destroyed by the Lithuanians or abandoned by the Order.

In February 1345, a large army of many European royals—King John of Bohemia with his son Charles, King Louis I of Hungary, William II, Count of Hainaut, Günther von Schwarzburg, Peter I, Duke of Bourbon, Henry II, Count of Holstein-Rendsburg—approached Pieštvė and Junigeda but received false reports of a Lithuanian raid towards Königsberg and rushed back to defend it. In fact, the Lithuanians attacked in the opposite direction towards Livonia destroying Tērvete, burning Mitau outer bailey, and looting areas around Sigulda and Turaida. A spring thaw made it impossible to return to Lithuania and, therefore, the grand campaign ended with no great accomplishments. The failure led to the resignation of Grand Master Ludolf König.

Pieštvė remained a major Lithuanian fortress as evidenced by Teutonic relief when they managed to quietly bypass it on their 1348 raid to environs of Ariogala. In 1357, Pieštvė was threatened by a crusader army from France, England, Nuremberg but instead the invaders decided to attack Junigeda where they were defeated. In April 1363, a year after the fall of Kaunas Castle, the Teutons attacked and destroyed New Kaunas which Lithuanians were hastily building at the mouth of Nevėžis and turned to Pieštvė. Before attacking, the Teutons offered the defenders to surrender. During the night, the defender abandoned the fortress and escaped. The undefended fortress was burned to the ground. The Teutons also burned down Junigeda. The loss of these defensive outposts along the Neman River was a major setback for the Lithuanians and signified a period of most intense Teutonic attacks.

Pieštvė fortress was rebuilt in May 1412 by Grand Duke Vytautas in preparation for possible war with the Order over Samogitia. However, the territorial disputes were resolved after the Gollub War and the Treaty of Melno (1422). Pieštvė and other fortresses along the Neman lost their strategic importance and were abandoned.

== Description ==
Historical sources did not provide a description of the fortress and no archaeological excavations were carried out on the hill fort. Therefore, available information about the fortress is very rudimentary. Based on preliminary observations, the fortress was 60 m × 35 m (197 ft × 115 ft) in size along the east–west axis. It was surrounded by wooden walls and steep slopes 30 m (98 ft) in height. On the eastern end, it was separated from the castle town by a rampart 7 m (23 ft) in height, a ditch 2 m (6 ft 7 in) in depth and 10 m (33 ft) in width, and another rampart 3 m (9.8 ft) in height and 10 m (33 ft) in width.
