= Siege of Kaunas =

Siege of Kaunas may refer to:

- Siege of Kaunas (1362), a 14th-century Teutonic siege of a Lithuanian castle
- Siege of Kaunas (1915), a World War I German siege of a Russian-held fortress
