= Rainiai massacre =

Massacre in Lithuania

Coordinates: 55°57′40″N 22°18′20″E

- Location: Telšiai, Lithuania
- Date: June 24–25, 1941
- Target: Lithuanian political prisoners
- Attack type: Mass murder
- Deaths: 70-80
- Perpetrators: NKVD, Red Army

The Rainiai massacre (Lithuanian: Rainių žudynės) was the mass murder of between 70 and 80 Lithuanian political prisoners by the NKVD, with help from the Red Army, in a forest near Telšiai, Lithuania, during the night of June 24–25, 1941. It was one of many similar massacres carried out by Soviet forces in Lithuania, and other areas under the control of the Soviet Union, during June 1941. Several thousand people were killed in these massacres. The Rainiai massacre was far from the largest of these massacres, but it is one of the best-known, due to the brutality and alleged tortures inflicted on the victims by the perpetrators. Similar atrocities were committed in other places, like the NKVD prisoner massacre in Tartu, in which almost two hundred people were murdered.

== Massacre ==

The Soviet Union had invaded Lithuania, Latvia and Estonia in June 1940. During the Soviet occupation of the Baltic states political repression followed with mass deportations of around 130,000 citizens carried out by the Soviets.

A decision was made to carry out the massacre after the June Uprising in Lithuania (1941), in which the Lithuanian Activist Front deposed the Soviet government in Lithuania, and Nazi Germany invaded the Soviet Union. The Soviet authorities were unable to evacuate the political prisoners at the Telšiai prison, but did not want to abandon them to be freed by the local population or by the Germans. Therefore, a punishment squad of the Red Army led by Dontsov was called in to "liquidate" them.

Most of the prisoners were put into trucks during the night of June 24 and taken to the Rainiai forest where they were tortured and killed. Many of the victims were so mutilated that only twenty-seven bodies could be identified after they were exhumed just three days later.

According to the coroner's examination published by the Lithuanian newspaper Ūkininko patarėjas after the exhumation, both the report and the testimonies of witnesses, concurred that the Soviets cut off tongues, ears, genitals, scalps, put genitals into mouths, plucked out eyes, pulled off fingernails, made belts of victims' skins to tie their hands, burned them with torches and acid, crushed bones and skulls, all while the prisoners were still alive. The organizers of the massacre included Pyotr Raslan, Boris Mironov, Nachman Dushanski, political leader of 8th border army Mikhail Kompanyanec, NKVD Kretinga county deputy director Yermolayev, and NKVD lieutenant Zhdanov.

== Victims ==

Most of those killed in the Rainiai massacre had been arrested for political reasons when Lithuania was occupied by the Soviet Union in 1940.

Some of them, like Vladas Petronaitis, were arrested for their roles in the independence struggle or their societal roles in independent Lithuania (intellectuals, politicians, lawyers, policemen and public servants). Some had been arrested as "enemies of the revolution" for their business interests, land ownership or savings, as Soviet propaganda taught that businessmen and landlords were thieves and oppressors.

Other people were arrested for possessing non-communist literature (such as books which supported the idea of independent Lithuania or were written by authors considered to be in the wrong by the Soviets), owning a Lithuanian flag, not giving their crops to the Soviet authorities, or similar "crimes". Others had been arrested without evidence, because their friends had been arrested or because someone denounced them. This group included mainly younger people, such as students from the Telšiai Crafts School aged 18 – 19 and other young people from the villages around Telšiai.

Many were arrested for having been members of certain parties or organizations such as the Boy Scouts and Pavasarininkai. Some of the youths had been preparing for an anti-Soviet rebellion. These people were held without trial in Telšiai prison until the massacre.

While most of the prisoners of the Telšiai prison were killed in the massacre, a few were released before it happened.

== After the massacre ==
When the bodies of those killed in Rainiai were exhumed and reburied after the Soviets retreated from the country, the funeral turned into a mass demonstration against the former Soviet occupation.

Both the German and Soviet occupying forces tried to use the events for propaganda purposes. Since several of the organizers and perpetrators were Jewish, the Nazi German occupying force produced propaganda blaming Jewish Bolshevik activists for the massacre. Perversely, in 1942, Soviet planes dropped propaganda pamphlets in Samogitia asking "Who are those 'Bolshevik martyrs'?" and blaming German forces for the massacre.

The local citizenry were well aware of the Soviet responsibility and in 1942, planned to build a chapel, designed by Jonas Virakas, to honor and remember the victims of the massacre. However, as the Soviet Union reoccupied the area in 1944, it was not built. Throughout the Soviet occupation, discussion of the massacre was suppressed, and it was not permitted to hold memorial services commemorating it. Despite this, local people, under threat of arrest used to erect crosses at the site of the Rainiai massacre; the crosses were periodically demolished by the Soviet authorities, only to spring up again.

The political organization Sąjūdis began to discuss the massacre more openly in 1988, during the glasnost policy of Soviet general secretary Mikhail Gorbachev.

After Lithuania regained its de facto independence, a chapel designed by Algirdas Žebrauskas was built in the Telšiai cemetery. Funded by donations, it was built in 1991, and became one of the first memorials to be erected for the people who were killed by the Soviet authorities during the Soviet occupation of Lithuania (1940–1941 and 1944–1991).

== Prosecutions ==
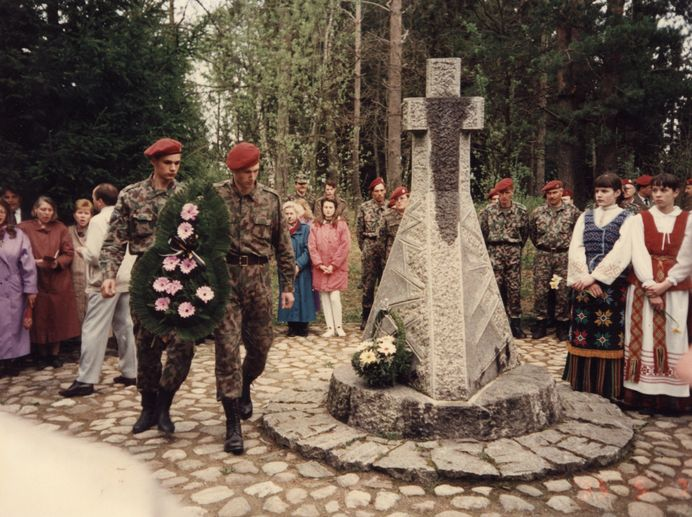
Ceremony at the Rainiai memorial in 1995

The perpetrators of the massacre continued to hold high positions in the Soviet Union; some were awarded medals. Pyotr Raslan, for example, was employed as an official in the Soviet Ministry of Religious Affairs.

After the dissolution of the Soviet Union, those perpetrators who remained in Lithuania fled to Russia and Israel. Lithuania requested their extradition for trial, which Russia refused, saying one of them was 'too ill to be tried'. Some perpetrators have since died.

In 2001, the Šiauliai Area Court in northwest Lithuania found a former officer of the NKVD, Pyotr Raslan, guilty of genocide against Lithuanian civilians and sentenced him in absentia to life in prison. He remained protected by Russian authorities and in 2004 Vytautas Landsbergis urged the Lithuanian president to boycott the Victory Day celebrations in Moscow for this among other reasons.

== Documentation ==
The massacre was well documented by both the Lithuanians and the Soviets; surgeons such as Leonardas Plechavičius examined the bodies after the exhumation and gave a full account of the torture and wounds inflicted on the victims. After the war, Plechavičius delivered a speech before the US House of Representatives about the massacre. An investigation was carried out. In 1942 the first book about the massacre was published, Rainių kankiniai. Soviet authorities attempted to document the events that took place in the first days after Germany invaded "Soviet" territory. Most of the communists of Lithuania fled to Russia when the invasion began. Some were asked to write their testimonies of the events. The Rainiai massacre was explained in the testimony of communists based in Telšiai. The leaders of Lithuanian SSR asked the perpetrators of the massacre to write their testimony after Antanas Bimba, a Lithuanian communist who was living in United States and sending aid to the USSR, found out about the massacre and demanded an explanation.

== Gallery ==
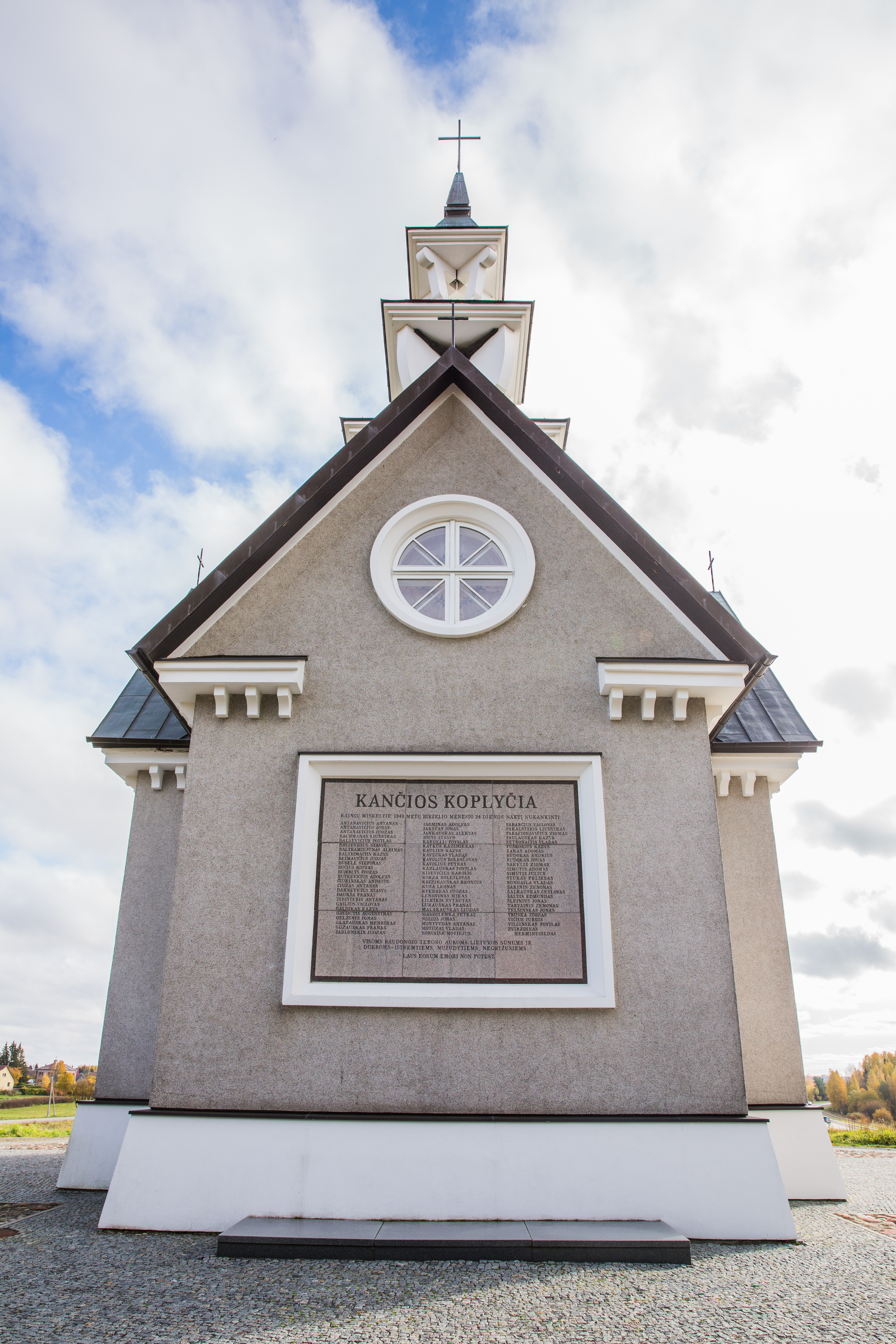

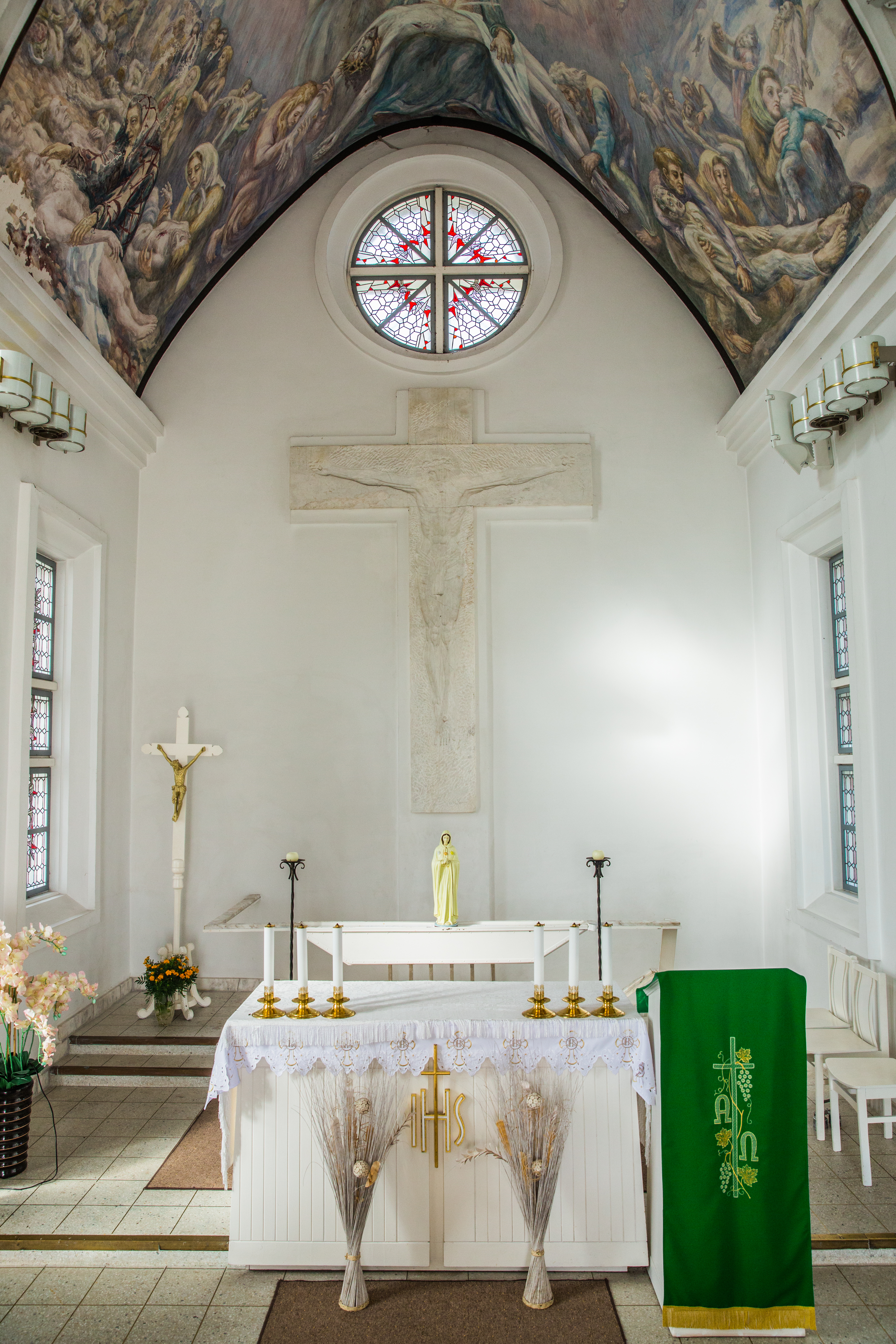

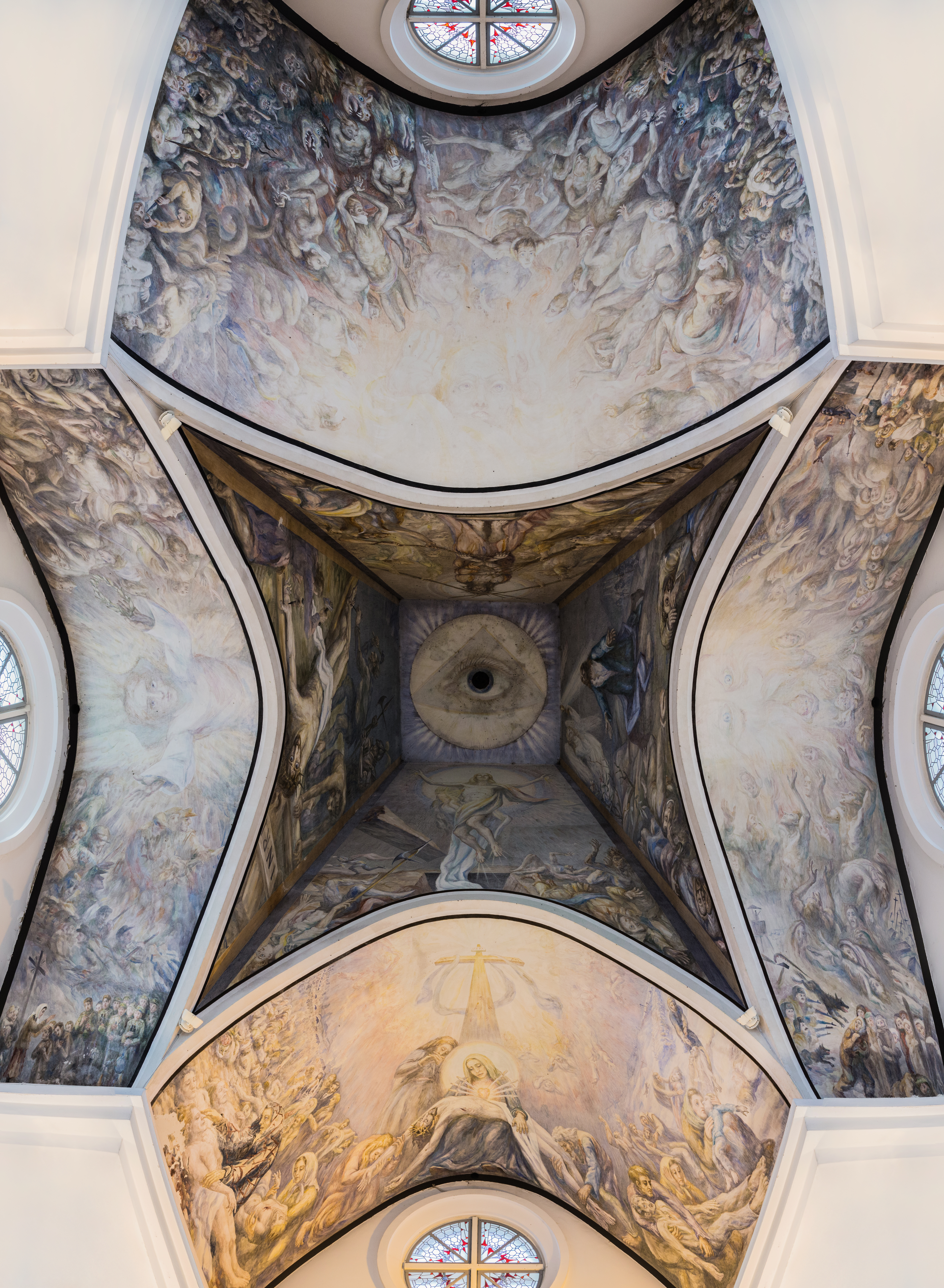

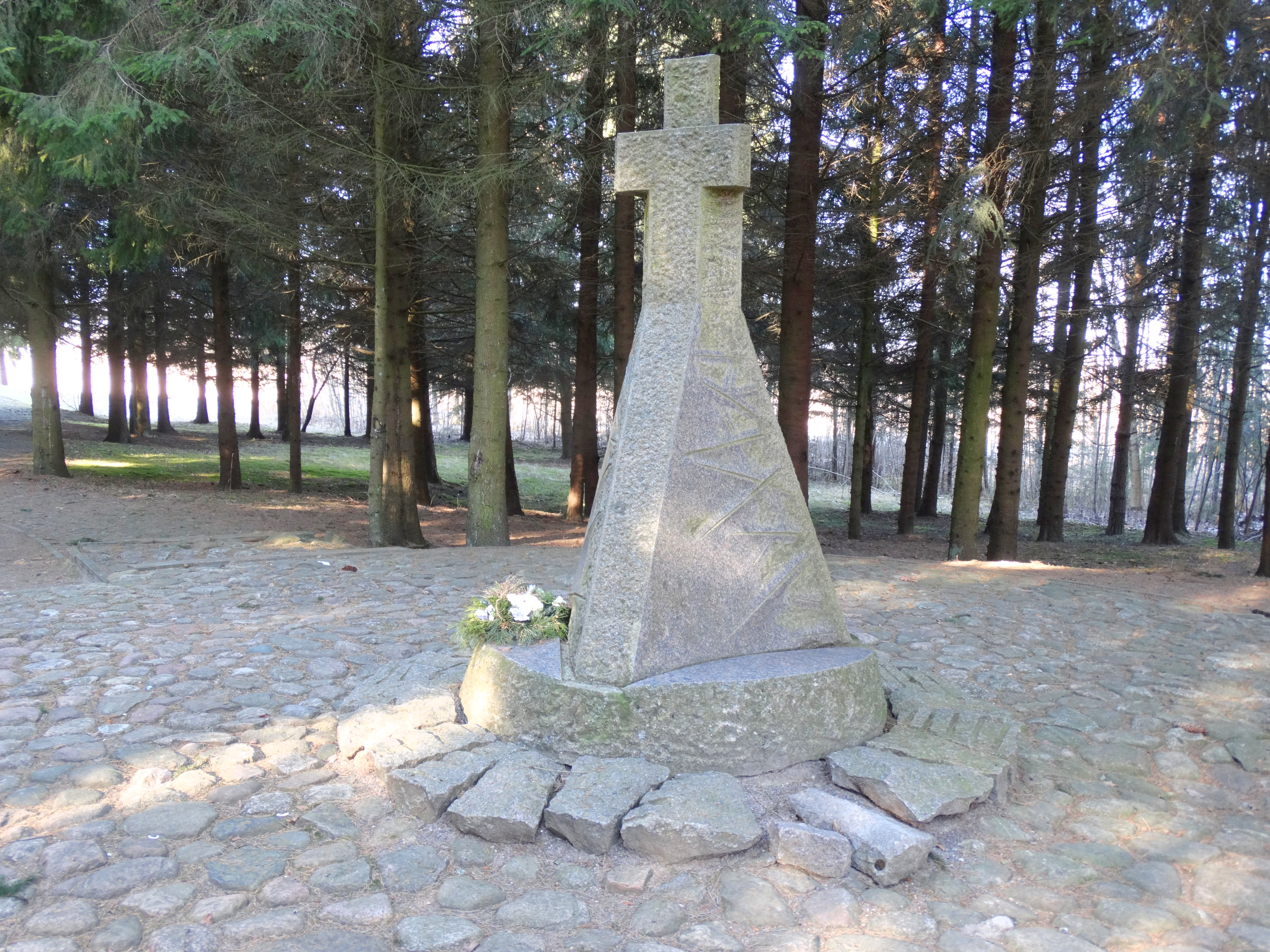

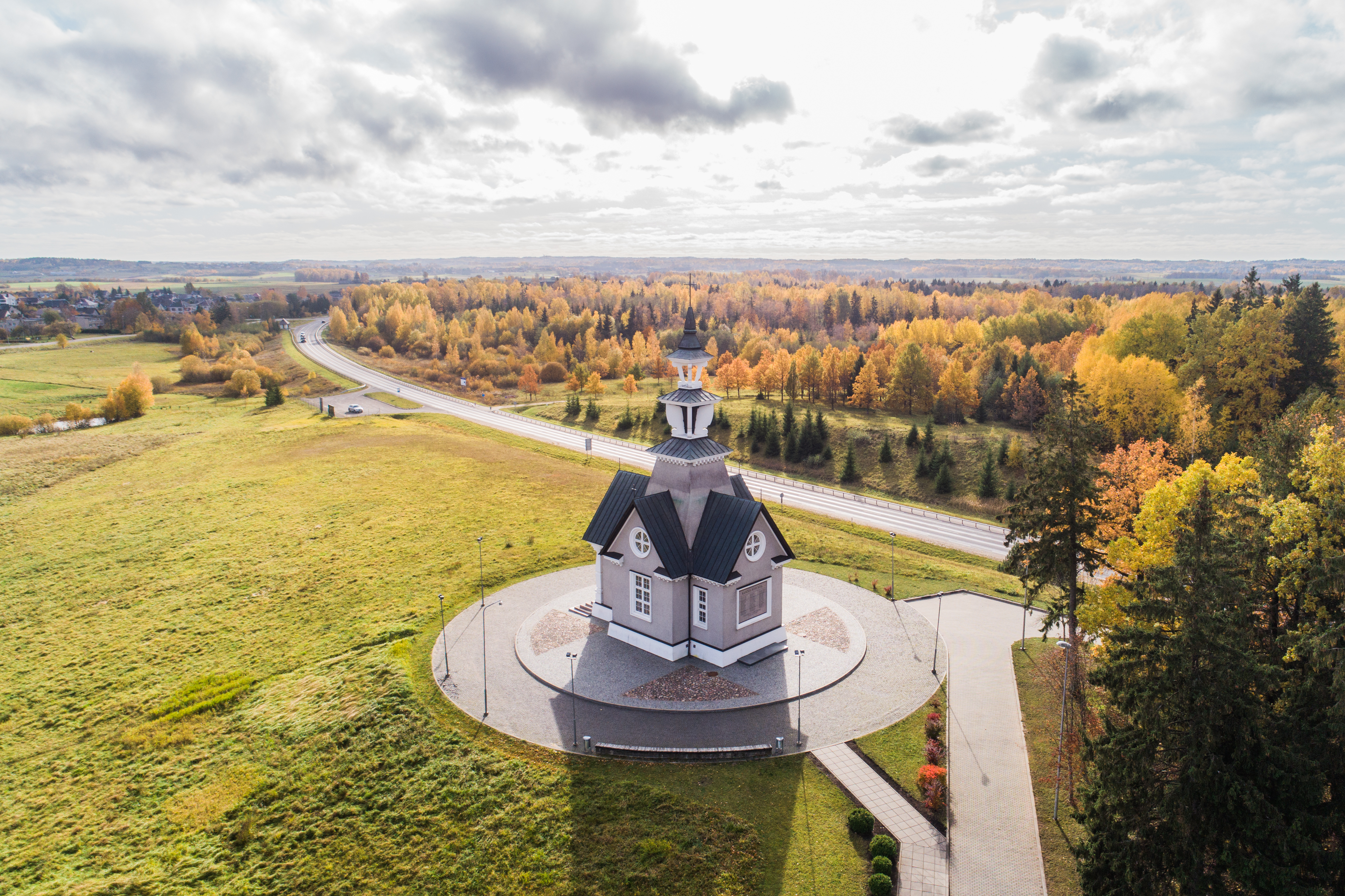

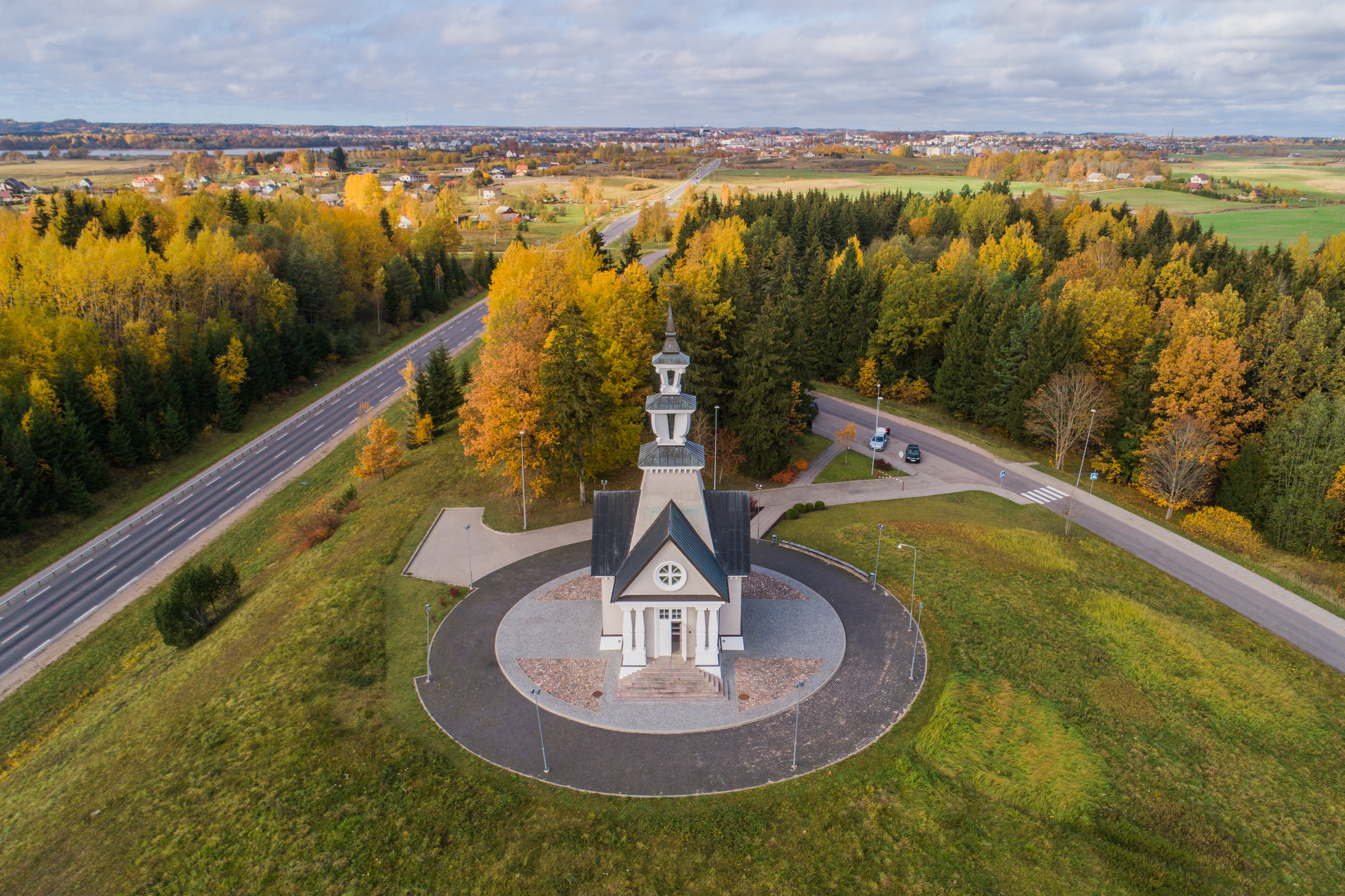

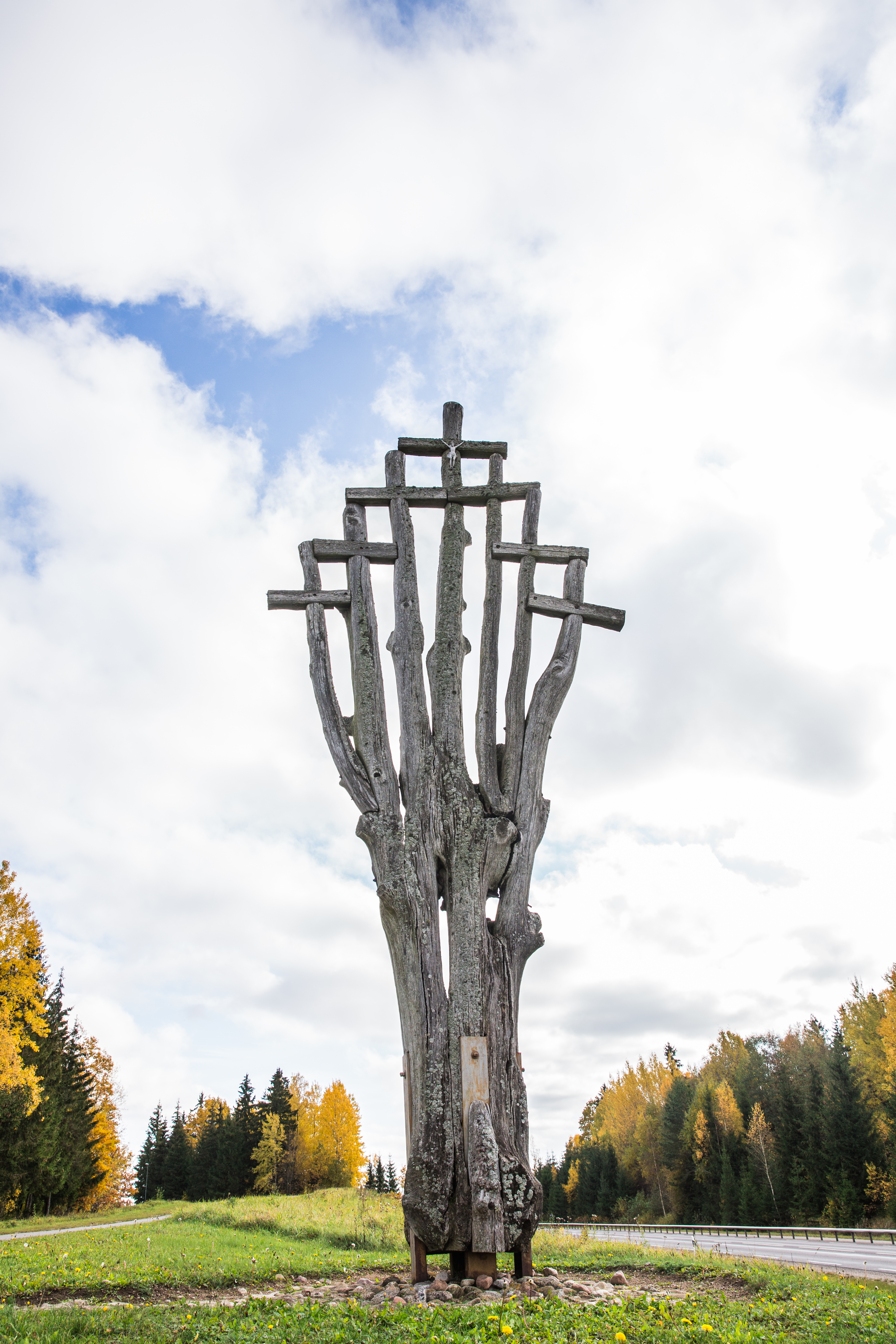
