= Seredžius =

- Town
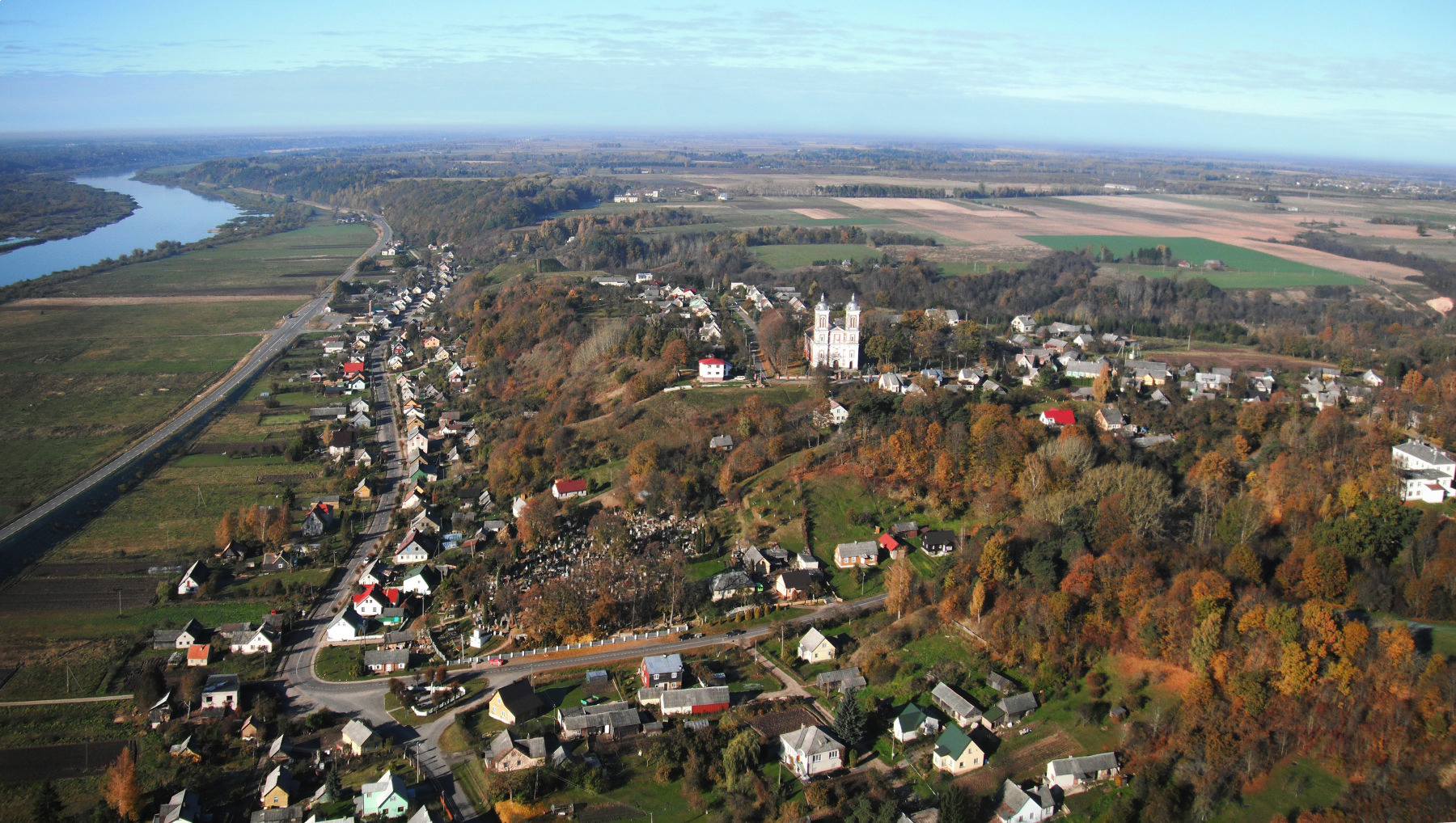

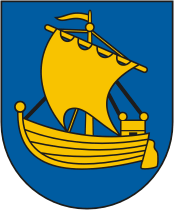
- Coat of arms

- Location within Lithuania
- Coordinates: 55°5′N 23°25′E
- Country: Lithuania
- Ethnographic region: Samogitia
- County: Tauragė County
- Municipality: Jurbarkas district municipality
- Eldership: Seredžius eldership
- Capital of: Seredžius eldership

Population (2011)
  - Total: 590
- Time zone: UTC+2 (EET)
  - Summer (DST): UTC+3 (EEST)

Seredžius is a town in Lithuania on the right bank of the Nemunas River near its confluence with the Dubysa River. According to the 2011 census, it had a population of 590.

== Names ==
The Yiddish name for the city was סרעדניק (Srednik), corresponding to the Polish Średniki, German Schrödnick, and Russian Средники (Sredniki). In local Samogitian dialect the town is known as Seredius, in Lithuanian - Seredžius. Other recorded forms of the town's name include Srednike, Seredzhyus, Seredzhus and Seredius. The name Seredžius is believed to be derived from середа (sereda), a word meaning "Wednesday" in many Slavic languages. This is probably because of the markets held there on Wednesday.

== History ==
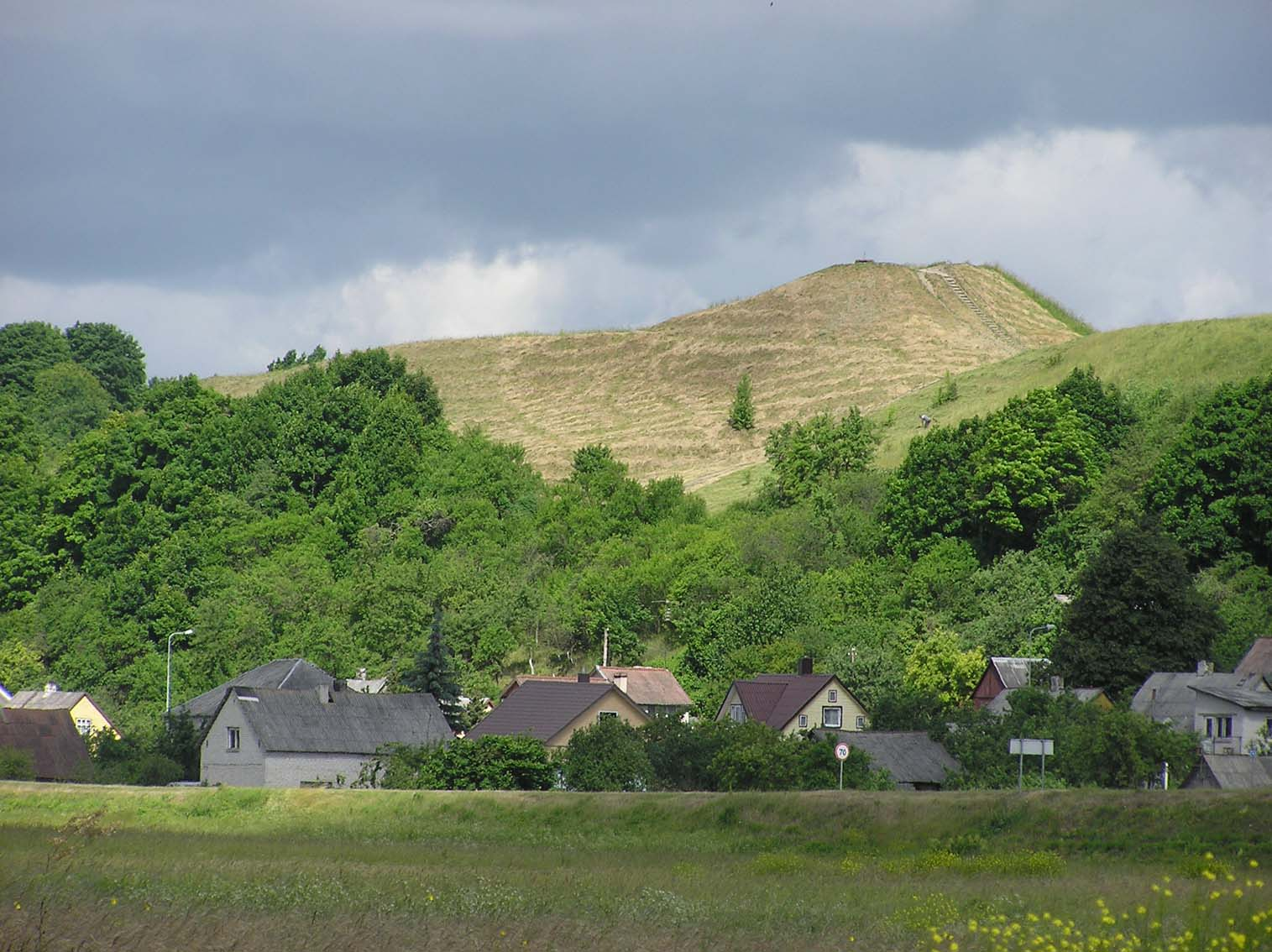
View of Seredžius with Palemon Hill (hillfort) in the background

Southeast of the town, archaeologists discovered graves from the 3rd–4th centuries. According to the Palemonids legend, noble refugees from the Roman Empire settled on the hill, now known as the Palemon Hill, and established the Grand Duchy of Lithuania. On the Palemon Hill the Lithuanian Pieštvė fortress stood during the Lithuanian Crusade. It was attacked by the Teutonic Knights numerous times in the late 13th and early 14th centuries. After the Battle of Grunwald, the location lost its military purpose and became private property of the Sapieha family.

The Sapiehas built a residential palace, which did not survive. The town's first Catholic church was built around 1608–12. The church was destroyed in 1829 after a landslide caused by extensive flooding. The residents built a wooden church, which was replaced by a Neo-Renaissance church dedicated to John the Baptist in 1913.

The town had a large Jewish population prior to World War II, was a shtetl. In 1900 (when part of the Russian Empire) the town's Jewish population numbered 1,174. The town's Jews were killed on September 4, 1941. On that day, 193 people were shot near the village of Skrebėnai: 6 men, 61 women and 126 children.

== Notable people ==
- Jonas Virakas (1905 – 1988), architect.
- Stasys Santvaras (1902 – 1991), poet, playwright, opera soloist
- Stasys Šimkus (1887 – 1943), composer.
- Jonas Čižauskas (1886–1974), organist, choirmaster, singer, composer.
- Al Jolson (born Eizer "Asa" Yoelson), singer, comedian, and actor
