= Bisenė =

- Jurbarkas District Municipality, Lithuania
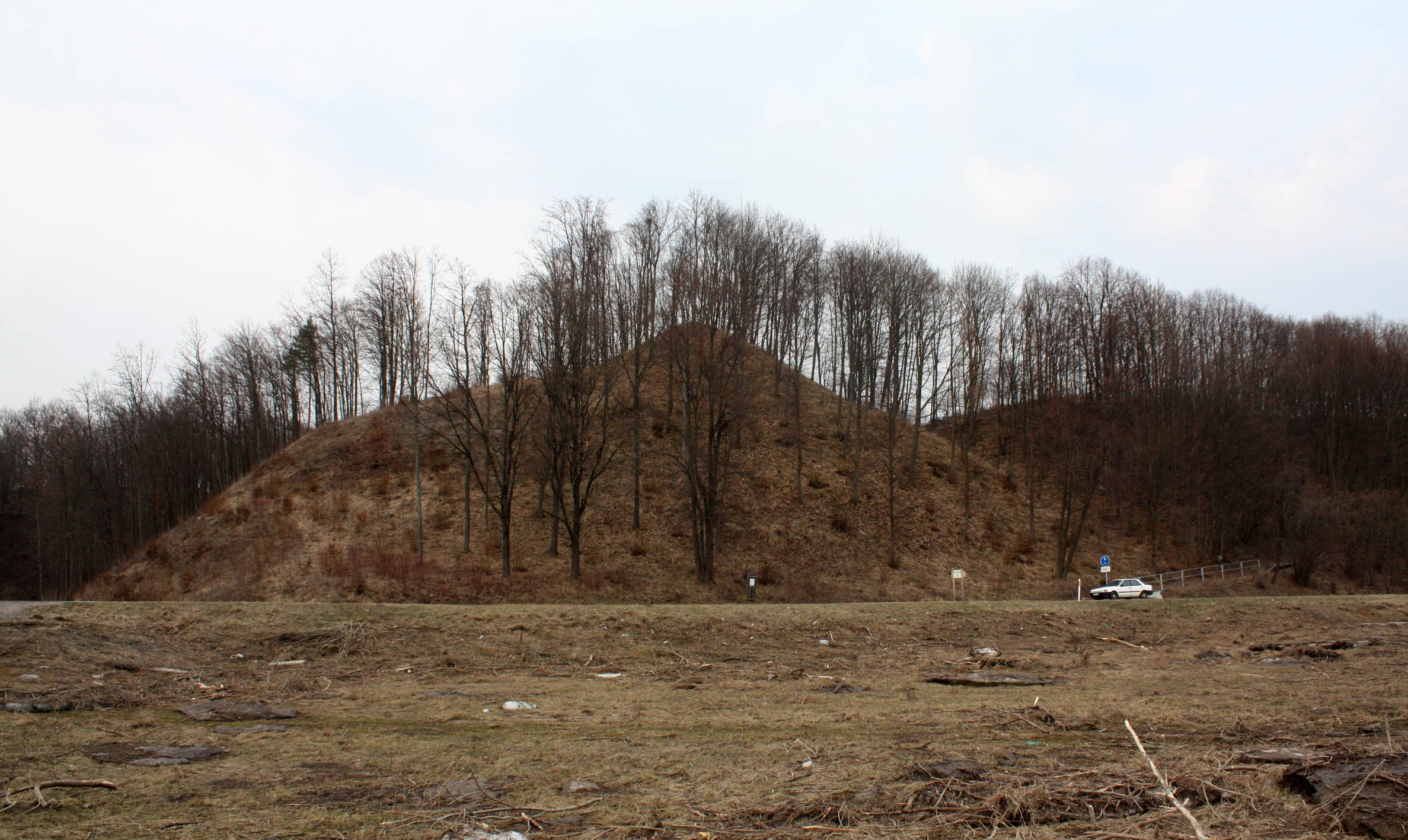
- Kartupėnai Hill Fort in April 2010

Site information
- Type: Hill fort

Location
- Coordinates: 55°6′8″N 23°0′21″E

Site history
- Built: Before 1283
- Built by: Grand Duchy of Lithuania
- Materials: Wood, earthworks
- Fate: Burned down in April 1316
- Battles/wars: 1283, 1313 (twice), 1316
- Events: Lithuanian Crusade

Bisenė or Bisena was a wooden fortress of the Grand Duchy of Lithuania during the Lithuanian Crusade. It was one of the Lithuanian defensive outposts along the Neman River and was burned down by the Teutonic Order in 1283 and 1316. Its location was long debated and often confused with Pieštvė, but after 1985 research of Romas Batūra it has been generally accepted to be Kartupėnai Hillfort near the confluence of the Kartupis and Neman in Jurbarkas District Municipality, Lithuania. After the burning down of Kolainiai in 1291 and Bisenė in 1316, Junigeda (Veliuona) became the westernmost Lithuanian fortress along the Neman.

== History ==
Chronicler Peter von Dusburg noted that the Teutonic Order finalized its conquest of Prussia and launched the Lithuanian Crusade in the winter of 1283. The first target of the Teutons was Bisenė. Teutonic soldiers, commanded by the Prussian Landmeister Konrad von Thierberg, crossed the frozen Neman River and rigorously attacked the Lithuanian fortress in the morning. It fell in the afternoon and was burned to the ground. Surviving defenders were taken captive. A detachment of the Teutons raided the surrounding area, taking much loot. Dusburg noted that many Teutons were injured in the attacks and four brothers drowned in the Neman when frozen ice collapsed under their feet.

Lithuanians rebuilt the fortress. In early 1313, the Teutonic order completed the construction of Christmemel not far from Bisenė and used it as a base for further attacks. In the summer of 1313, Bisenė was attacked by Prussian Landmeister Heinrich von Plötzke and his men. Part of his force sailed via the Neman and used boats to construct a bridge across the river. The invaders used "war machines" but the fortress withstood the assault. Landmeister Heinrich with men from Sambia and Natangia tried again in fall 1313. This time they burned the outer bailey but failed to take the main fortress.

Bisenė was manned by a Lithuanian garrison in one-month shifts, a weakness in security which was exploited by the Teutons. Sometime between 1307 and 1315, 22 brothers and 60 soldiers attacked 85 Lithuanians returning home after their shift. All Lithuanians were killed except for three wounded men who managed to escape. The same type of attack was repeated twice in 1316. The first attack, commanded by the vicekomtur of Christmemel, saw 75 Lithuanians killed and five survivors who managed to escape. On 4 April 1316, three brothers with three squires departed Ragnit towards Bisenė at the end of the one-month shift. They killed six Lithuanians while the other six escaped. As they approached Bisenė they saw that the fortress was left unattended. Using the opportunity, the Teutons burned it down. This time the fortress was not rebuilt.

== Description ==
Historical sources did not provide a description of the fortress and no archaeological excavations were carried out on the Kartupėnai Hill Fort. Therefore, available information about the fortress is very rudimentary. The northern and western edges of the hill collapsed into the Kartupis due to erosion making analysis more challenging. Based on preliminary observations, the fortress was 50 m × 30 m (164 ft × 98 ft) in size along the east–west axis. It was surrounded by wooden walls and steep slopes 20 m (66 ft) in height. Eastern side of the hill fort had a rampart, 7 m (23 ft) in height and 21 m (69 ft) in width, which transitions into a ditch, 2.5 m (8 ft 2 in) in depth and 25 m (82 ft) in width. To the east of the hill fort, there is a settlement covering an area of 1.3 ha (3.2 acres) but it has not been archaeologically excavated.
