= Petras Raslanas =

Lithuanian genocide perpetrator

- Born: March 25, 1914; Riga, Governorate of Livonia, Russian Empire
- Died: 2002 (aged 88); Balashikha, Moscow Oblast, Russia
- Known for: Perpetrating the Rainiai Massacre
- Conviction: Genocide (in absentia)
- Penalty: Life imprisonment
- Military career
- Allegiance: USSR
- Branch: NKVD; MGB; KGB
- Service years: 1940–1969
- Rank: Colonel

Petras Raslanas (Russian: Пётр Петрович Раслан, romanized: Pyotr Pyotrovich Raslan; March 25, 1914 – 2002) was a Lithuanian communist. He worked for the Soviet security agencies (NKVD, MGB, KGB) achieving the rank of colonel in the Lithuanian SSR from 1940 to 1969. As a person responsible for the Rainiai massacre, he was convicted of the crime of genocide by independent Lithuania in 2001. He died in Russia as a free man.

== Early life ==
Raslanas was born on March 25, 1914, in Riga (in the then Governorate of Livonia of the Russian Empire) to an ethnic Lithuanian family. According to his memoirs, due to financial struggles, he was forced to work at a young age and could not finish primary school. In 1927, at the age of 13, he got a job at a metalworking workshop in Rokiškis which brought him into contact with communist activists.

He joined the Lithuanian Komsomol in 1931 which was an illegal organization in Lithuania. For communist activities, he was imprisoned by Lithuania in 1932–1938. He joined the Communist Party of Lithuania in 1938 and became a member of the Central Committee of the Lithuanian Komsomol.

== Soviet security officer ==
After the Soviet occupation of Lithuania in June 1940, he joined the NKVD and worked in Kaunas and Kėdainiai. In January 1941, he became head of the NKVD in Telšiai district and is claimed to be responsible for the Rainiai massacre, one of the NKVD prisoner massacres at the start of the German invasion of the Soviet Union in June 1941.

During World War II, Raslanas retreated to the Soviet Union and continued working for the NKVD in Perm, Yaroslavl, Moscow. In 1943, he graduated from the Graduate School of the NKVD. He returned to Lithuania after the Red Army pushed out the Germans in mid-1944. He was deputy director of various sections and departments of the Lithuanian NKGB and MGB. From May 1953 to May 1954, he headed the 4th Directorate of the Lithuanian KGB. He headed KGB offices in Panevėžys (1954–1955) and Kaunas (1955–1961). He was the head of the Operational Technical Directorate of the Lithuanian KGB in 1961–1969. He participated in the suppression of the armed anti-Soviet resistance.

== Later life and trial ==
In 1960, Raslanas graduated with a law degree from Vilnius University. After the retirement from the Soviet security agencies in 1969, he worked at the Lithuanian Ministry of Public Utilities in 1969–1971, the Lithuanian representative office of the Council for Religious Affairs in 1971–1984, and the publishing association Periodika in 1985–1986. In 1991, he moved to Russia.

In 2001 he was convicted of genocide by Šiauliai Area Court in Lithuania in absentia and sentenced to life imprisonment. Raslanas denied the charges and Russian authorities denied requests for his extradition. He continued to live as a free man in Russia. Raslanas died in 2002.

== Awards ==
Raslanas received the following Soviet awards:

- Order of the Patriotic War, 2nd degree (1945, 1985)
- Order of the Red Star (1949)
- Order of the Badge of Honour (1950)
- Medal "For Battle Merit" (1952)
- Medal "For Impeccable Service" (1958, 1960)
- Badge of Honored State Security Employee (1960)
- Medal "For Labour Valour" (1965)
- Honored Jurist of the Lithuanian SSR (1974)
