= Vileišis =

Vileišis is a Lithuanian surname that may refer to:

- Jonas Vileišis (1872–1942), Lithuanian politician, diplomat, and lawyer
- Petras Vileišis (1851–1926), Lithuanian engineer and publisher
- Antanas Vileišis (1856–1919), Lithuanian doctor and activist
- Vileišis Palace, Neo-baroque style architectural ensemble in Vilnius, Lithuania
