= Jonas Virakas =

Lithuanian architect (1905–1988)

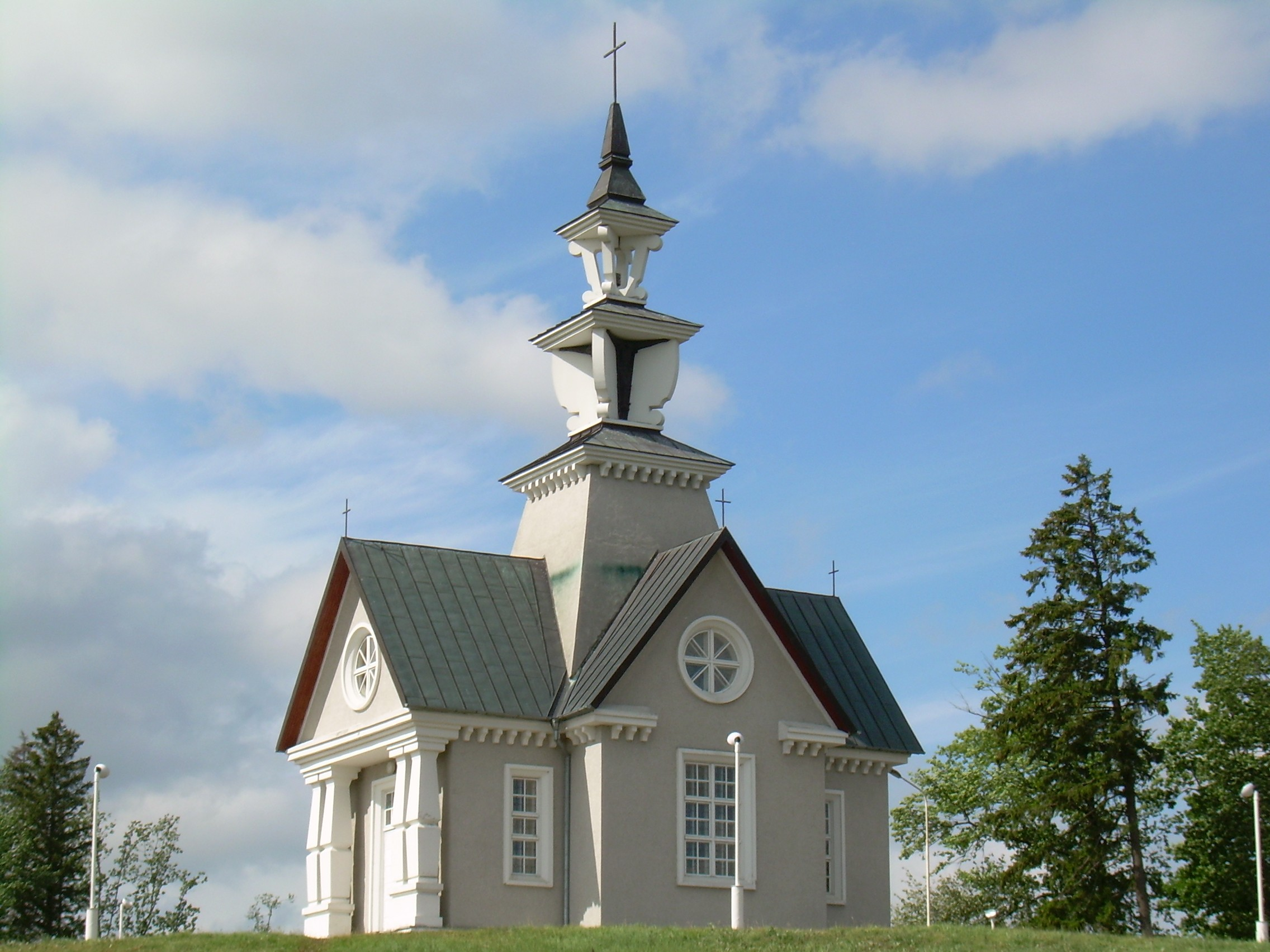
Virakas created a contest winning project of the Rainiai Chapel, dedicated to the Rainiai massacre victims

Jonas Virakas (5 September 1905 – 30 April 1988) was born in the town of Seredžius in the Kaunas district. He studied at the Kaunas Art School. He worked as a draftsman for the architect Vladimiras Dubeneckis until 1934, and continued architecture studies at the Kaunas Art Institute in 1940. Starting in 1942, Virakas started teaching design and architectural drawing as well as interior design and decoration at the Kaunas Art Institute.

In 1944, he became the dean of the Decorative Architecture Department. Starting in 1949, the architect worked at the Kaunas Fine Art Workshop for more than thirty years. Virakas created a number interiors for drugstores, civil registry offices, halls, and bookstores. His most prominent work is the interior design of the Tulpė Cafe in Kaunas and the central bookstore in Kaunas. The interiors created by this artist are remarkable for their simplicity, logical and constructive distribution of space, and use of decorative elements.

Jonas Virakas died in Kaunas on April 30, 1988, and is buried in the Karmėlava Cemetery.
