= Wojciech Jastrzębowski (sculptor) =

Polish sculptor

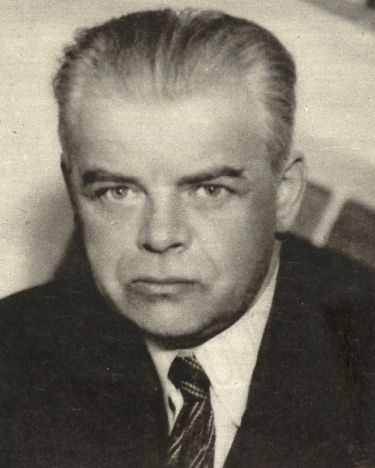
- Born: 25 February 1884; Warsaw, Poland
- Died: 9 March 1963 (aged 79); Warsaw, Poland
- Occupation: Sculptor

Wojciech Jastrzębowski (Polish pronunciation: [vɔj.t͡ɕɛx jastʐɛŋbɔvski]; 25 February 1884 – 9 March 1963) was a Polish sculptor. His work was part of the sculpture event in the art competition at the 1932 Summer Olympics.
