= Veliuona =

- Town
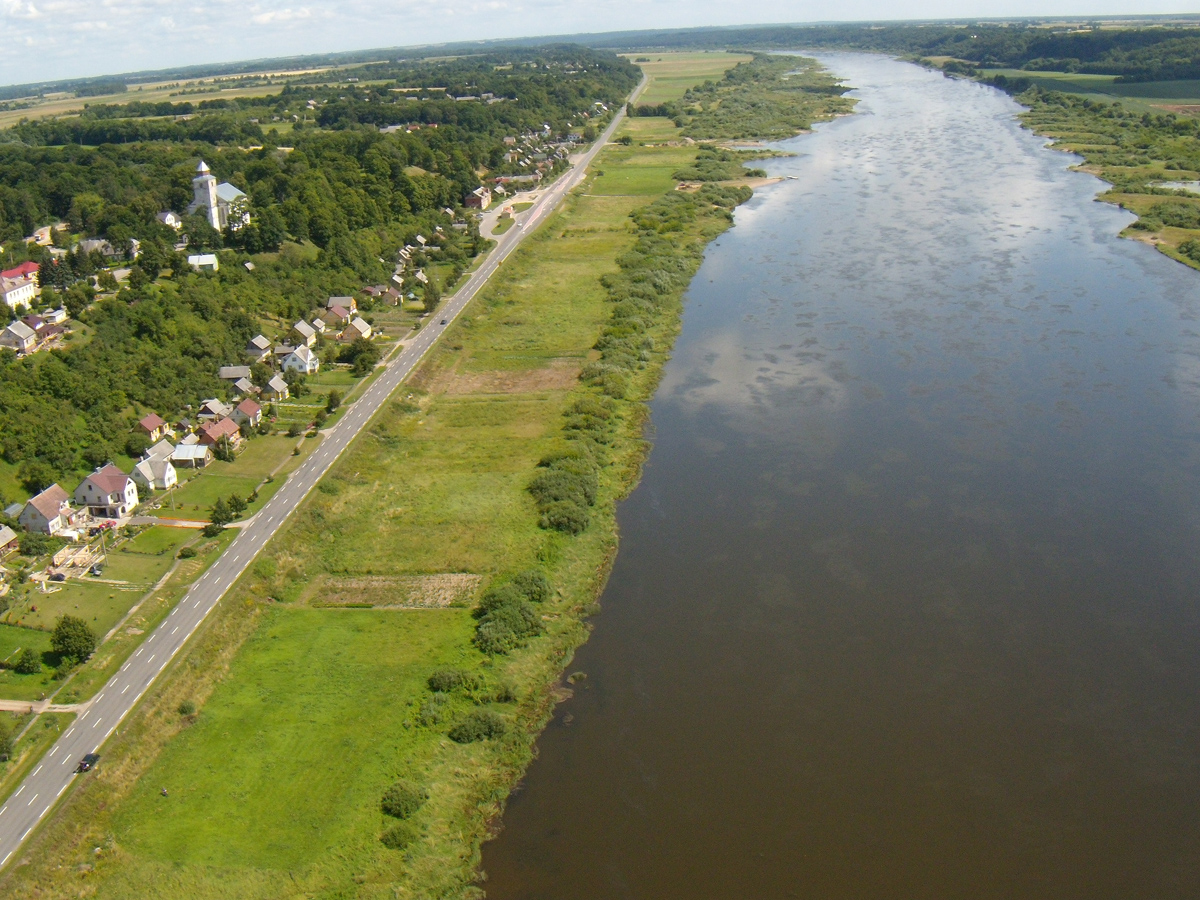

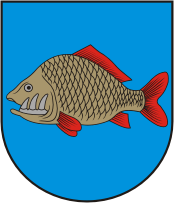
- Seal

- Location within Lithuania
- Coordinates: 55°4′56″N 23°16′16″E
- Country: Lithuania
- County: Tauragė County

Population (2011)
  - Total: 726
- Time zone: UTC+2 (EET)
  - Summer (DST): UTC+3 (EEST)

Veliuona (Samogitian: Veliouna, Polish: Wielona, German: Wehlonen) is a small town on the Nemunas River in the Jurbarkas district municipality in Lithuania.

== History ==
Veliuona (also known as Junigeda) was first mentioned in 1291 in the chronicle of Peter of Duisburg. The town is primarily known as the burial place of Gediminas. An old church, founded by Vytautas the Great in 1421, was rebuilt and enlarged in 1636. In 1501–1506 Veliuona was granted Magdeburg rights by the Grand Duke of Lithuania and King of Poland Alexander Jagiellon. In the 18th century Veliuona belonged to prince Józef Poniatowski, in the 19th century to the Zalewski family.

== Gallery ==
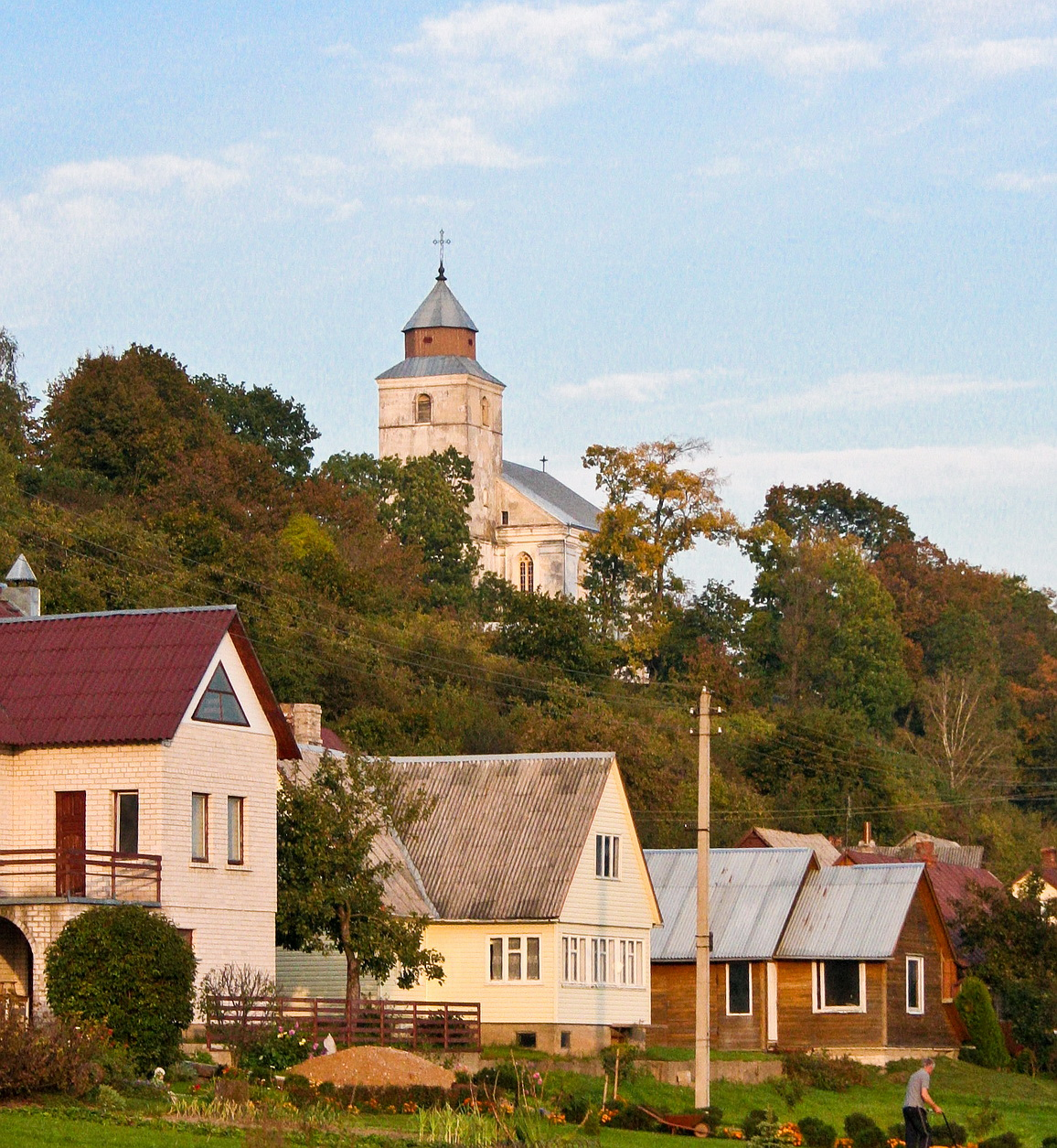
Veliuona from west

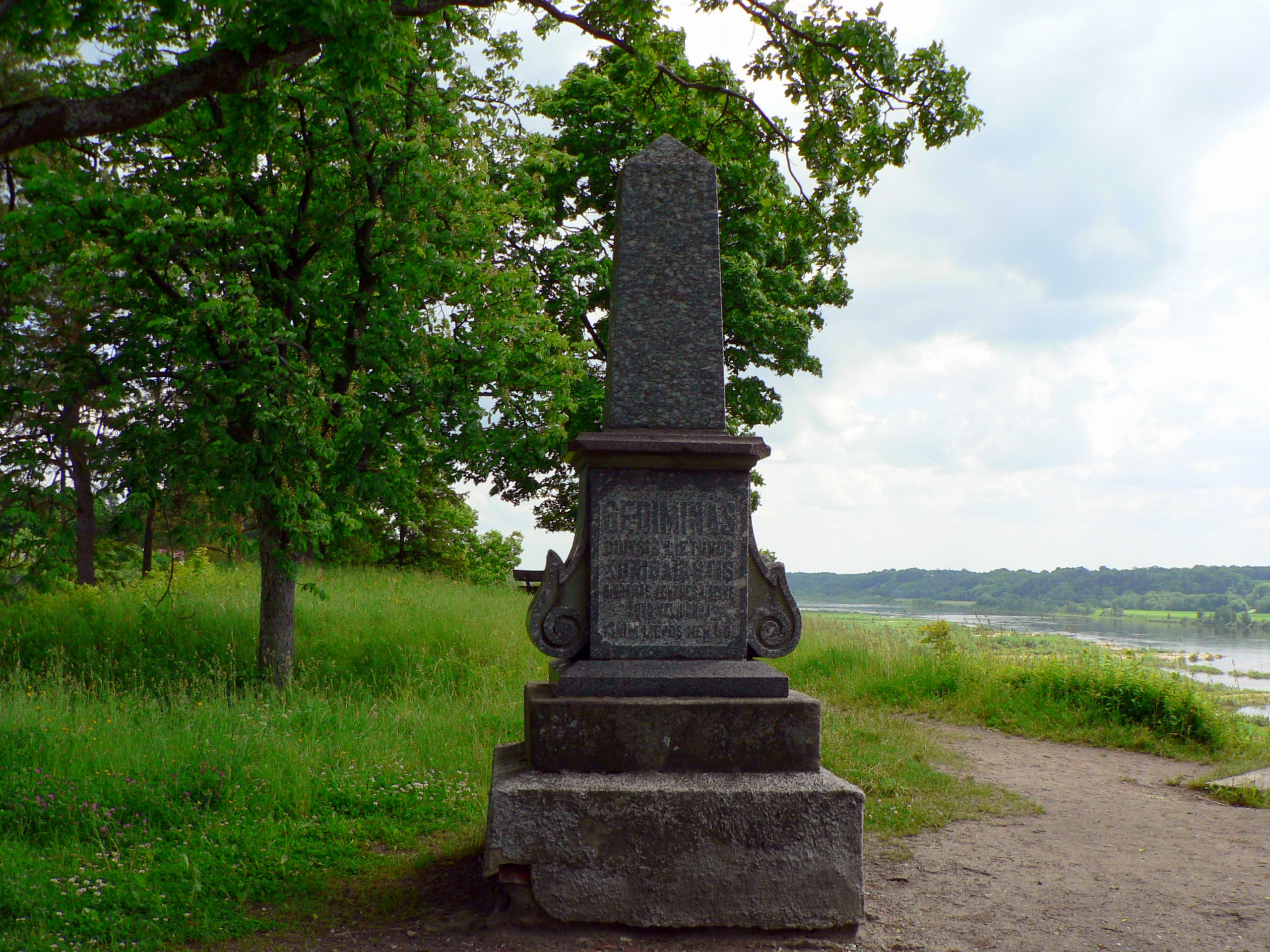
Gediminas tombstone

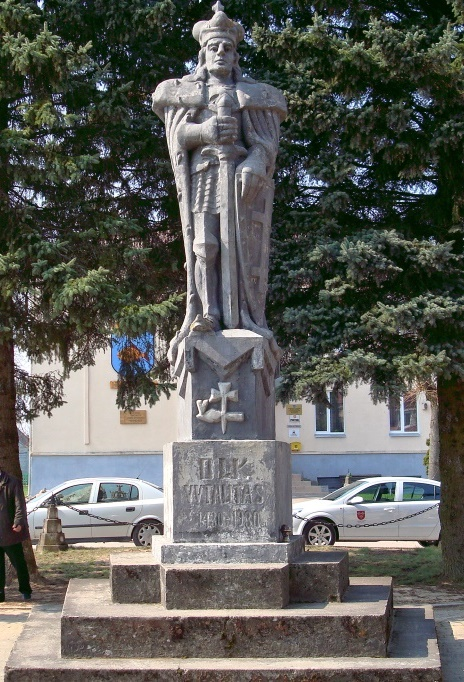
Vytautas the Great Monument

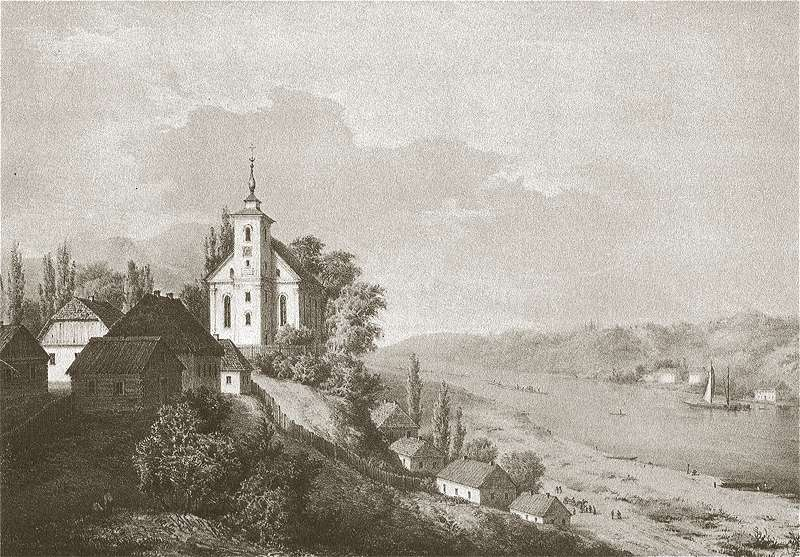
Veliuona in 19th century
