= Kaunas Garrison Officers' Club Building =

- Kauno įgulos karininkų ramovė
- The Three Giants

- Interactive map of the Kaunas Garrison Officers' Club Building area

General information
- Status: Used by the Lithuanian Armed Forces
- Type: Cultural institution
- Architectural style: Modernised historicism, national style
- Location: Kaunas, Lithuania, A. Mickevičiaus g. 19
- Coordinates: 54°53′48″N 23°55′01″E
- Groundbreaking: October 1935
- Inaugurated: April 23, 1937
- Cost: Over 1.27 million litas
- Owner: Lithuanian Armed Forces

Technical details
- Material: Granite, masonry (brick)
- Floor count: 4
- Lifts/elevators: 1

Design and construction
- Architects: Stasys Kudokas, Elmar Lohk, Herbert Johanson, Vladimiras Dubeneckis, Mykolas Songaila, Jonas Kova-Kovalskis,
- Engineer: Jonas Kriščiukaitis, Kazimieras Kriščiukaitis

Kaunas Garrison Officers' Club Building (Lithuanian: Kauno įgulos karininkų ramovė) is a building in Kaunas, Lithuania. At construction cost of over 1.27 million Lithuanian litas, it was one of the most luxurious buildings built in interwar Lithuania. Located next to Laisvės alėja, the main pedestrian street, the building features nationalistic symbolism and decorative folk motifs. The second of the four floors has four formal rooms of grand but eclectic design. Their interior pays homage to the Grand Duchy of Lithuania and was designed by prominent Lithuanian artists. Built in 1935–1937, the building served as the headquarters of the Officers' Club of the Lithuanian Army and venue for various official events. The building suffered great damage in the Lithuanian SSR (1945–1990). The Lithuanians recovered the building from the Russian Army in 1992 and it was taken over by the Lithuanian Armed Forces in 2000. In the early 2000s, the building underwent major renovation to restore and recreate as much of the authentic interwar decor as possible. In 2015, the building was one of 44 objects in Kaunas to receive the European Heritage Label.

== History ==
The first soldiers' club was established in July 1919. By 1924, this club evolved to the Officers' Club (Lithuanian: karininkų ramovė) of Lithuanian military officers, doctors, and chaplains. Its Lithuanian name ramovė was invented by professor Jonas Jablonskis, the father of standard Lithuanian language. He described the club as a peaceful and serene (ramybė and rimtis) shelter from the chaos of the war, just like the Romuva temple was a shelter for pagan Lithuanians. At the time, the club owned a two-floor house on the corner of A. Mickevičiaus street and Laisvės alėja built in 1860. The idea for a dedicated headquarter building was raised in 1930. In 1931, the club held an international competition for the design. It was won by Estonian architects Elmar Lohk and Herbert Johanson. The design was further work on by Vladimiras Dubeneckis and after his death in 1932 by Mykolas Songaila. The project was completed in 1933, but the construction due to financial difficulties did not start until 1935. The location was hotly debated, from outlandish proposals to demolish the Church of St. Michael the Archangel and build the club building in its place or built it on the Napoleon's Hill to more serious proposals to build it outside the city center where it could be accompanied by a park or a garden.

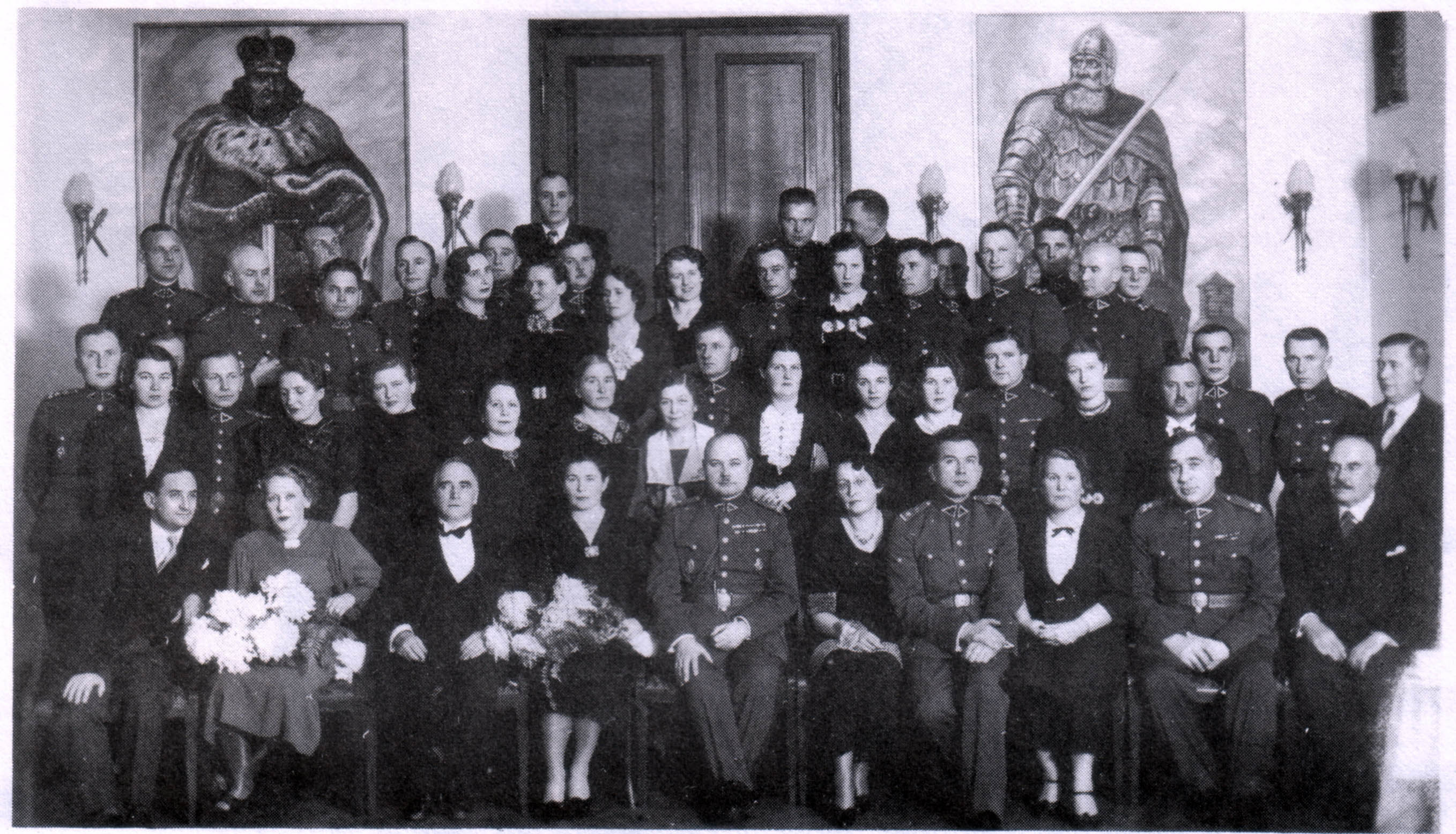
Lithuanian Army Topography Department officers and civil servants in Dukes' Hall, 1937

The construction, at a cost of over 1.27 million Lithuanian litas, was completed in April 1937. Part of the required cost was covered by the soldiers from their official salary (2% in 1920s and 1% in 1930s). The remaining 780,000 litas was provided as a loan by the State Savings Bank. The building was built with four floors, covering over 4,500 square metres (48,000 sq ft) with the first floor being made from granite and the remaining floors from masonry bricks. The building used as much local Lithuanian materials as possible. Each floor of the building served a distinct function. The first floor was open to the public and housed a large restaurant. The second floor was the formal floor for various official events. The third floor was the private space for officers with a library, salon, chess room. The fourth floor was a hotel for visiting officers. The basement had a gym and a shooting range. The building also featured technical innovations, such as modern lighting by AEG, ventilation, and elevator.

During the interwar period when Kaunas was the temporary capital of Lithuania, the building was an object of great importance that often hosted military and other official events, including reception of foreign dignitaries by President Antanas Smetona. During World War II, the building was occupied by the Red Army in June 1940. During the German occupation, Lithuanians were allowed to use the building but their activities were limited. When Lithuania was occupied for the second time by the Soviets in 1944, the building was turned into officer's club of the Red Army, its nationalistic symbols were destroyed, and the building fell into the general state of disrepair.

The Lithuanians recovered the building from the Russian Army in 1992. The ownership was restored to the reestablished Officers' Club, but it lacked financial resources to repair the building. Of a particular concern was the leaky roof. The building was taken over by the Lithuanian Armed Forces in 2000 and the building underwent major renovation to restore and recreate as much of the authentic interwar decor as possible. In 2015, the building was one of 44 buildings in Kaunas to receive the European Heritage Label.

== Exterior ==
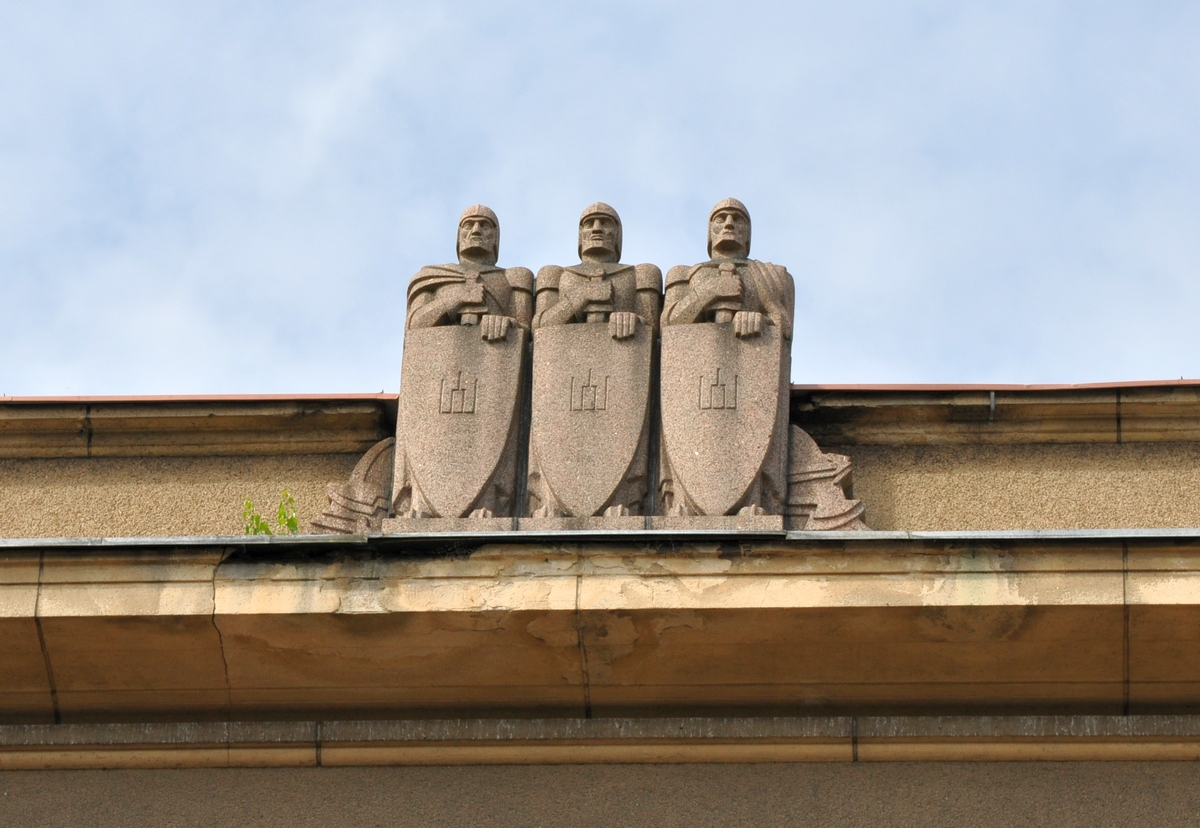
Three coats of arms of Lithuanian cities: Kaunas, Vilnius, Klaipėda (left) and The Three Giants (right)

The building exterior was described as "modernized Renaissance". The exterior is decorated with sculptural composition The Three Giants (Lithuanian: Trys milžinai) depicting three warriors of the Grand Duchy of Lithuania. Their shields feature the columns of Gediminas. The original sculpture survived because it was boarded up during the Soviet era. Coat of arms of three cities decorate the entrance doors: taurus with a cross of Kaunas, Saint Christopher of Vilnius, and castle towers of Klaipėda. It was a clear political statement: during the interwar period, Lithuania was involved in territorial disputes with Poland regarding the Vilnius Region and with Germany regarding the Klaipėda Region. The sculpture and the coat of arms were created by Bronius Pundzius. The first floor windows are covered with grates more as a decoration than for security – without them the large windows looked more like display windows.

== Formal rooms ==
=== Great Hall ===
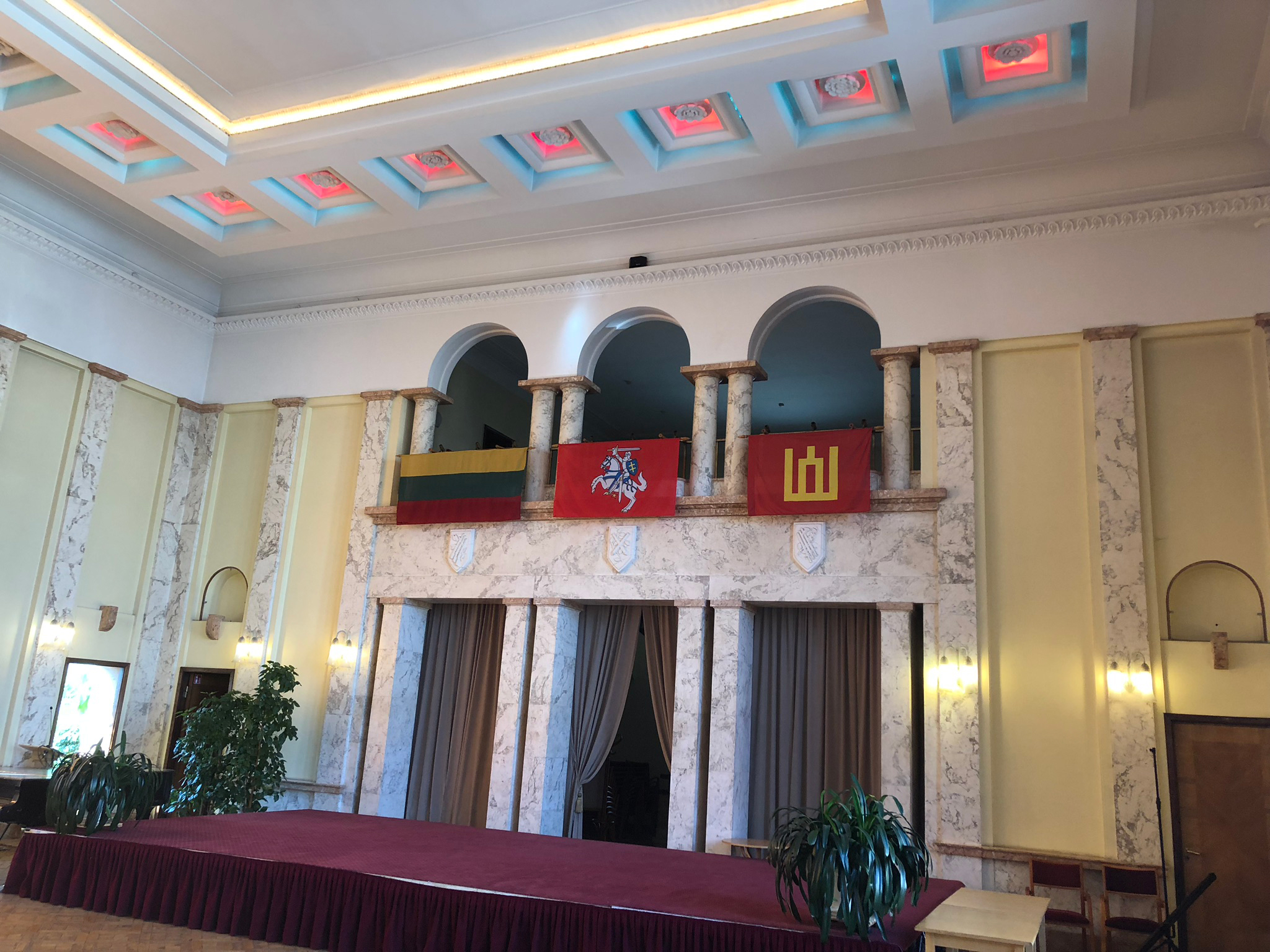
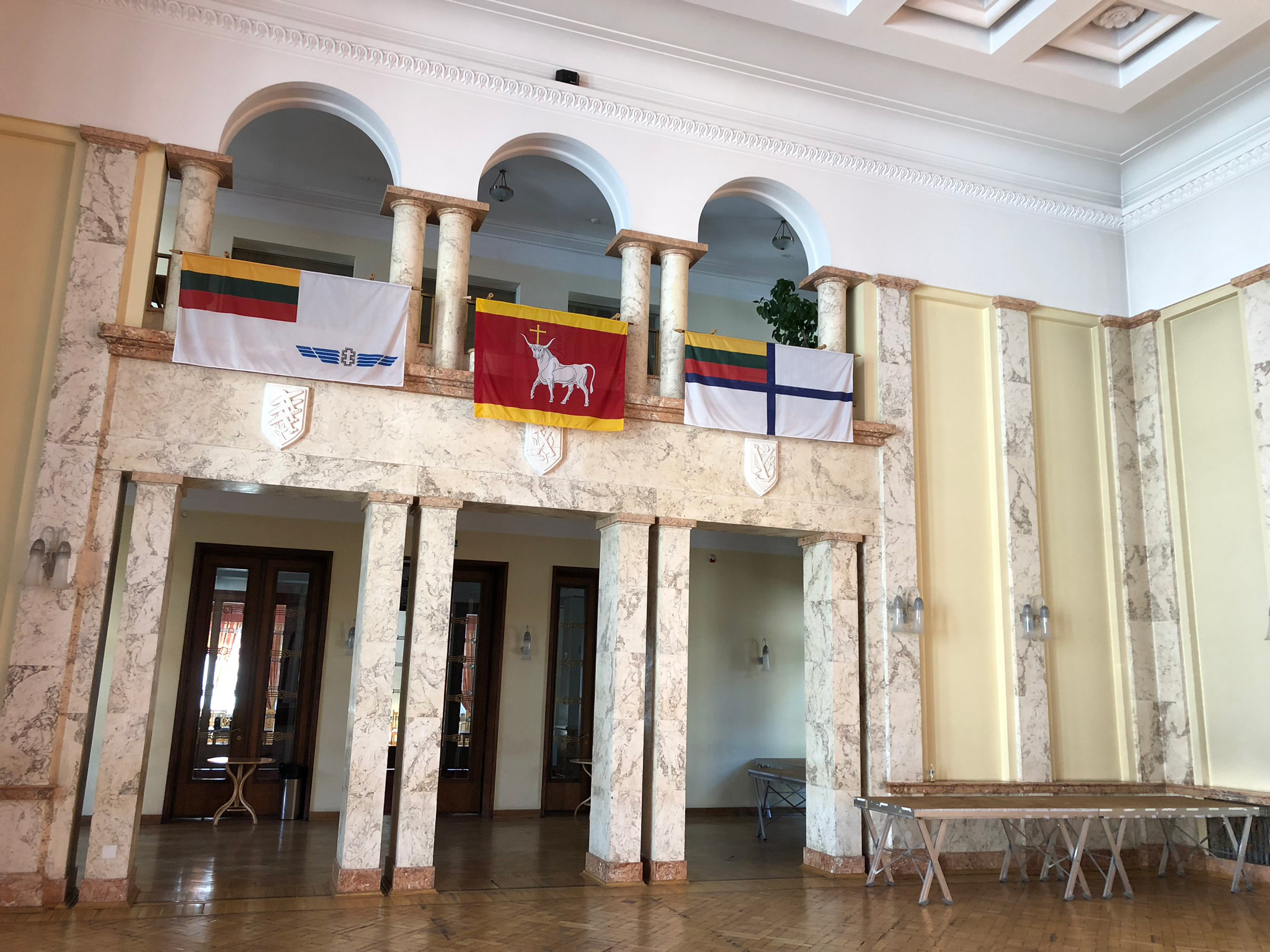
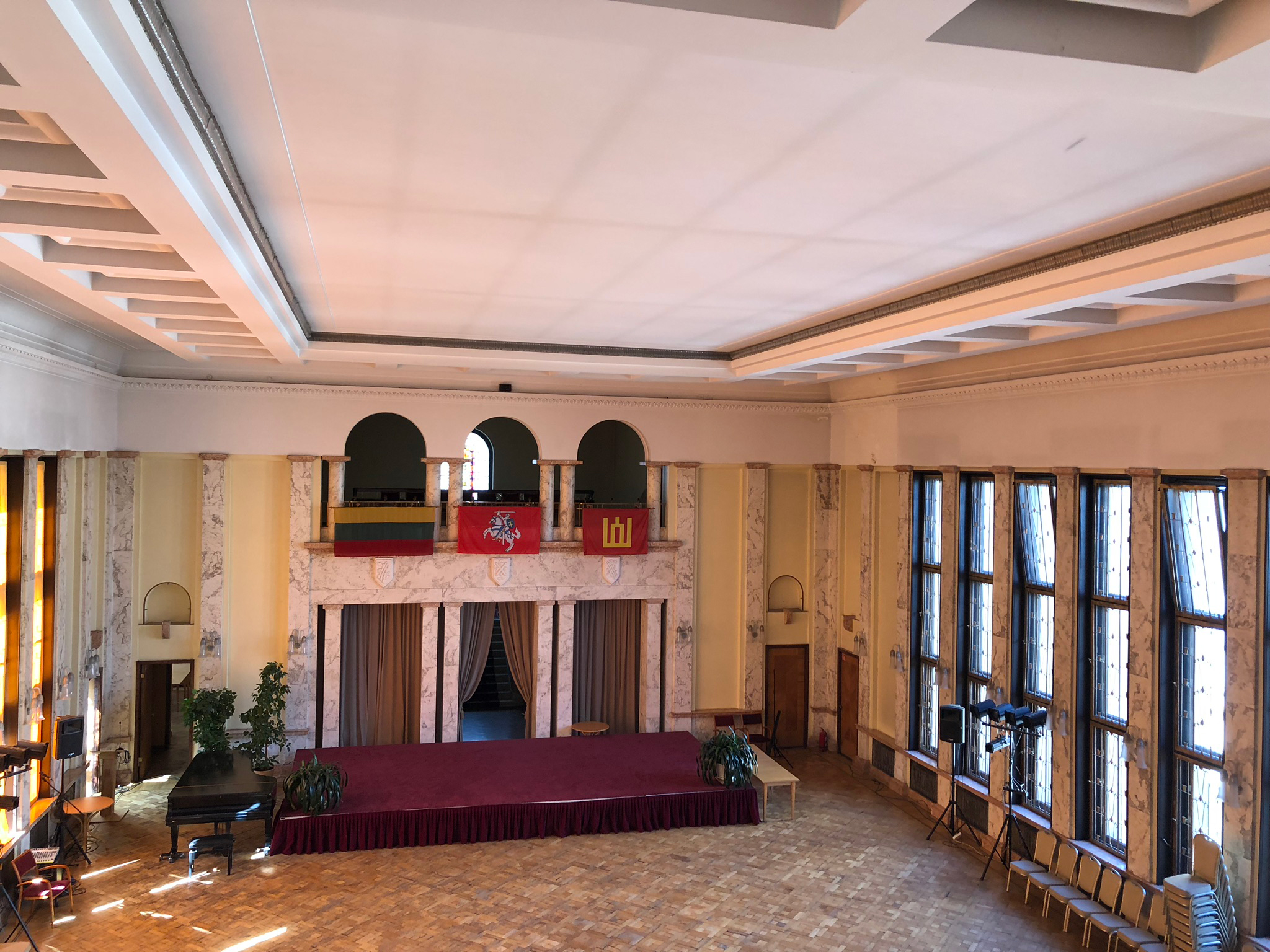
Great Hall

The Great Hall hosts the major events. During the Operation Bagration, in summer 1944, the Great Hall briefly served as a military hospital. The interior is decorated with shields of six main branches of the interwar Lithuanian Armed Forces: Aviation, Engineers, Navy, Infantry, Artillery and Cavalry.

The hall has two balconies: one for the spectators and the other for the musicians. The balconies have bas-reliefs by Petras Rimša that depict four branches of the military. The ceiling is 8 metres (26 ft) in height and features a coffer with tulips. The white ceiling is illuminated with yellow, green and red lights – colors of the Lithuanian flag. Such lighting was installed when the building was built. The columns are covered with marble, windows feature tulip motifs, and radiators are hidden by bronze grates. The black grand piano, made by Steinway & Sons in 1936, was likely gifted by the First Lady Sofija Smetonienė in 1939. Behind the grand piano, doors lead to a small winter garden that during the interwar period had a fountain.

=== Small or Dukes' Hall ===
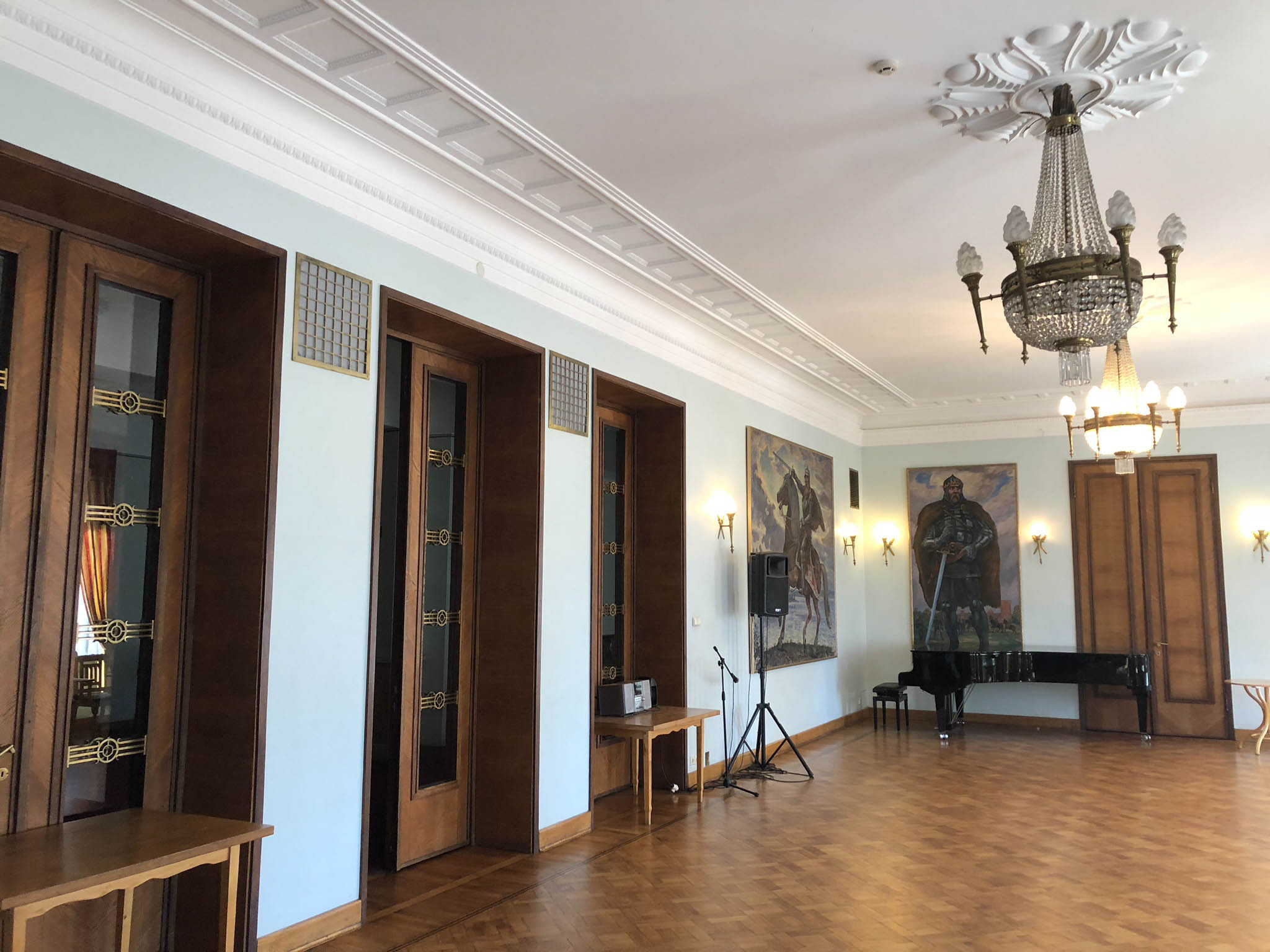
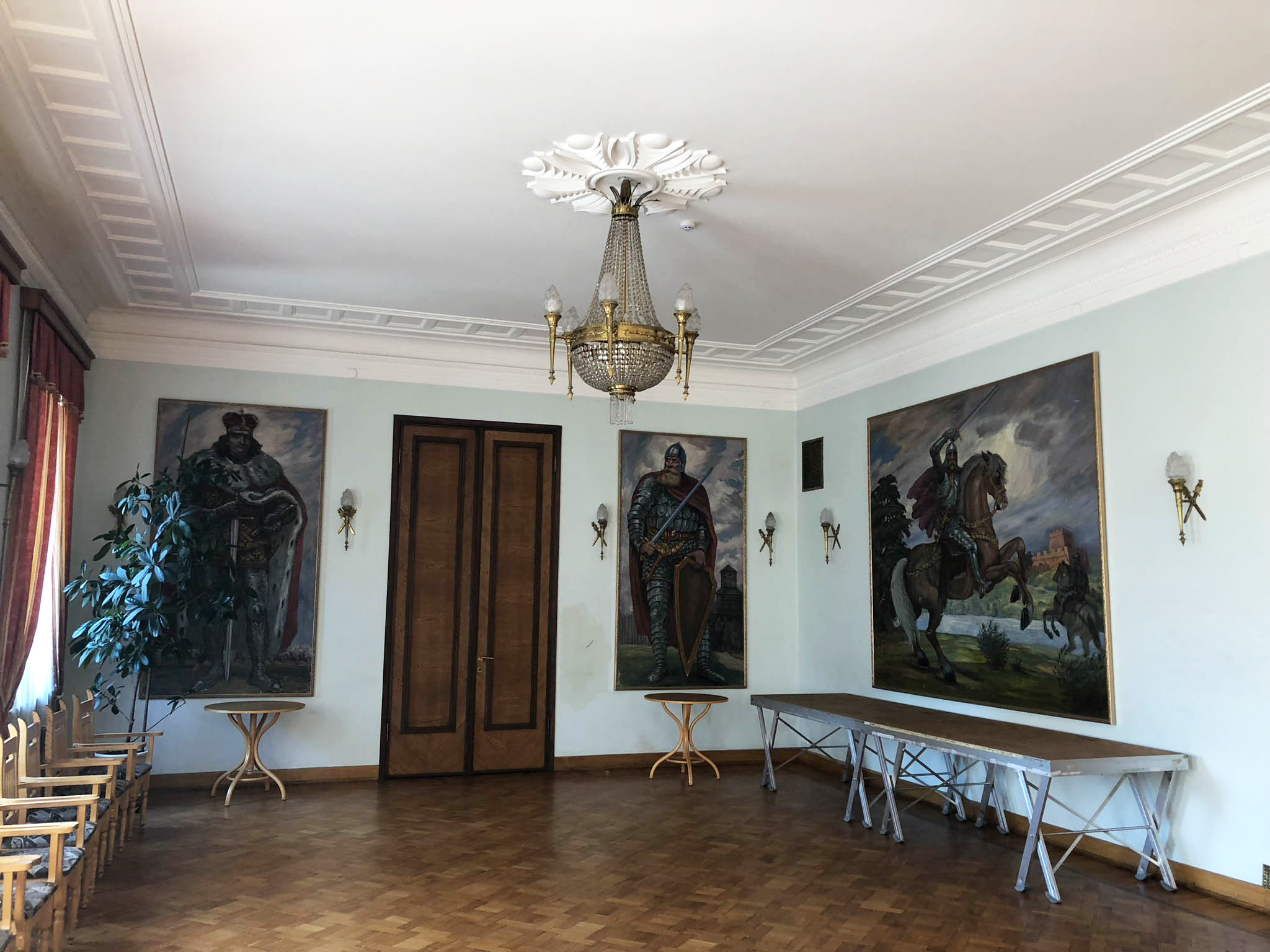
Small or Dukes' Hall

The Dukes' Hall is located in front of the Great Hall. It reused furniture and chandeliers from the old club building. It is dedicated to the Grand Dukes of Lithuania and King Mindaugas. Their full-length portraits were completed in 1937 by Petras Kalpokas. After World War II, the paintings were missing for many years. They were unexpectedly found in the Vytautas the Great War Museum – removed from the frames and rolled up they were inventoried as "unknown paintings of dukes". The paintings depict King Mindaugas, Grand Dukes Vytenis, Kęstutis, Gediminas (father of the Gediminids dynasty), Algirdas, and Vytautas the Great. The painting of Gediminas was severely damaged, and it is believed that Soviet soldiers used it to play darts.

=== Sitting-room of Vytautas the Great ===
The sitting-room of Vytautas the Great resembles a medieval castle hall and is dedicated to Vytautas the Great. Its designer, architect Jonas Kova-Kovalskis, studied Gothic architecture by visiting the Malbork and Kuressaare Castles. It is the most luxurious room but also suffered the most damage during the Soviet era. The hall is decorated with seven murals by Jonas Mackevičius, depicting the key moments from Vytautas' life, including the victory in the Battle of Grunwald (an adaptation of Battle of Grunwald by Jan Matejko) and the Congress of Lutsk which declared him King of Lithuania. During the Soviet years, the murals were painted over (possibly on purpose to preserve from destruction by the Soviets) but they were restored in 2006.

The sitting-room also has a still operational grey and white marble fireplace, decorated with authentic bas-reliefs by Petras Rimša that depict Vytautas the Great and map of the Grand Duchy of Lithuania during his reign. The bas-reliefs were saved by Rimša's nephew architect Aidas Rimša. The room is also decorated with Lithuanian folk art symbols; for example, solar symbol Swastika decorates benches created by Jonas Prapuolenis. The wooden floor tiles mimic design found in Lithuanian woven fabrics. The walls are decorated with chandeliers made from antlers, chairs are covered with boar pelts. The room has stained glass windows (originals by Stasys Ušinskas, reconstruction by Vytautas Švarlys) that depict medieval coat of arms.

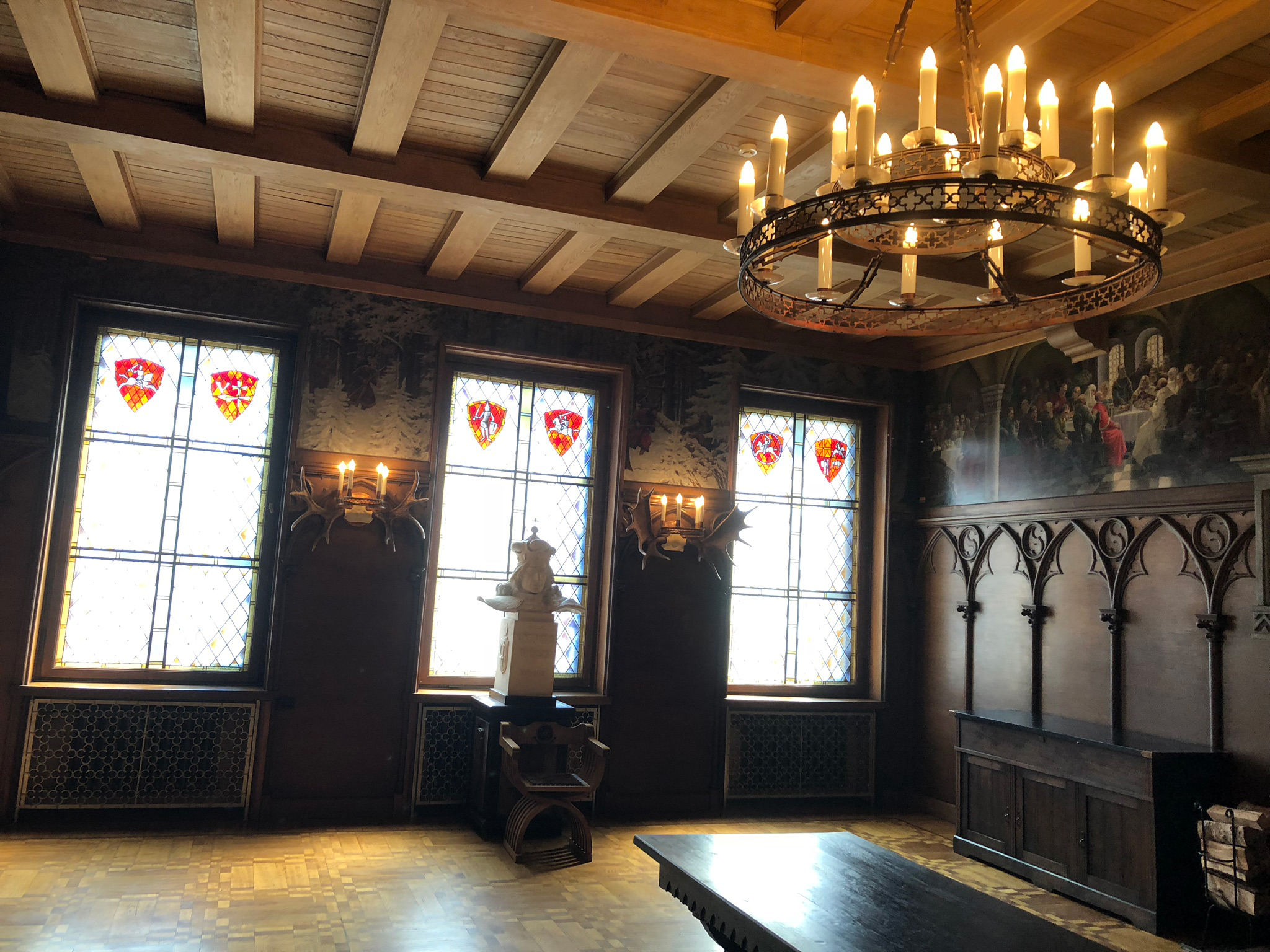

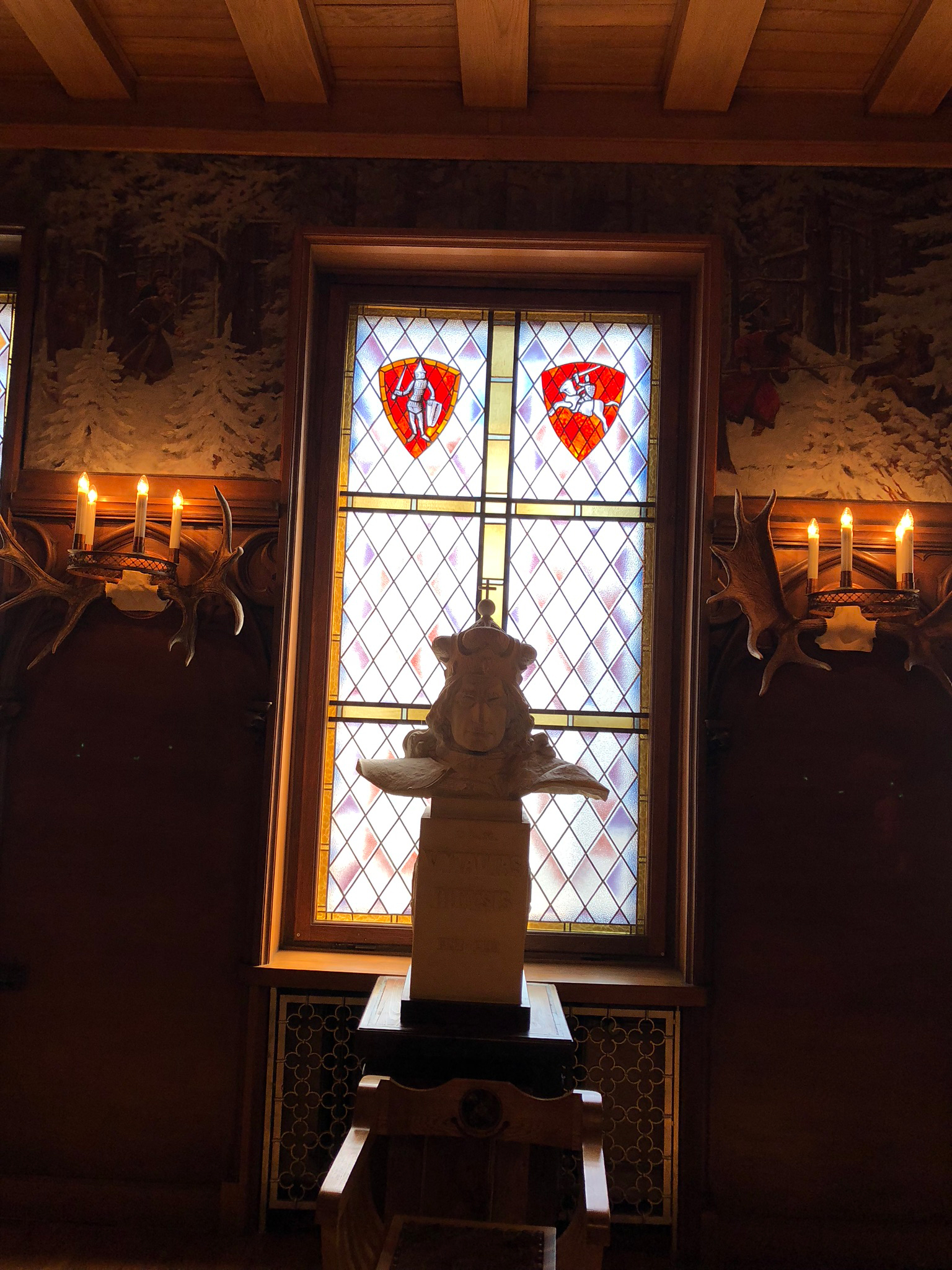

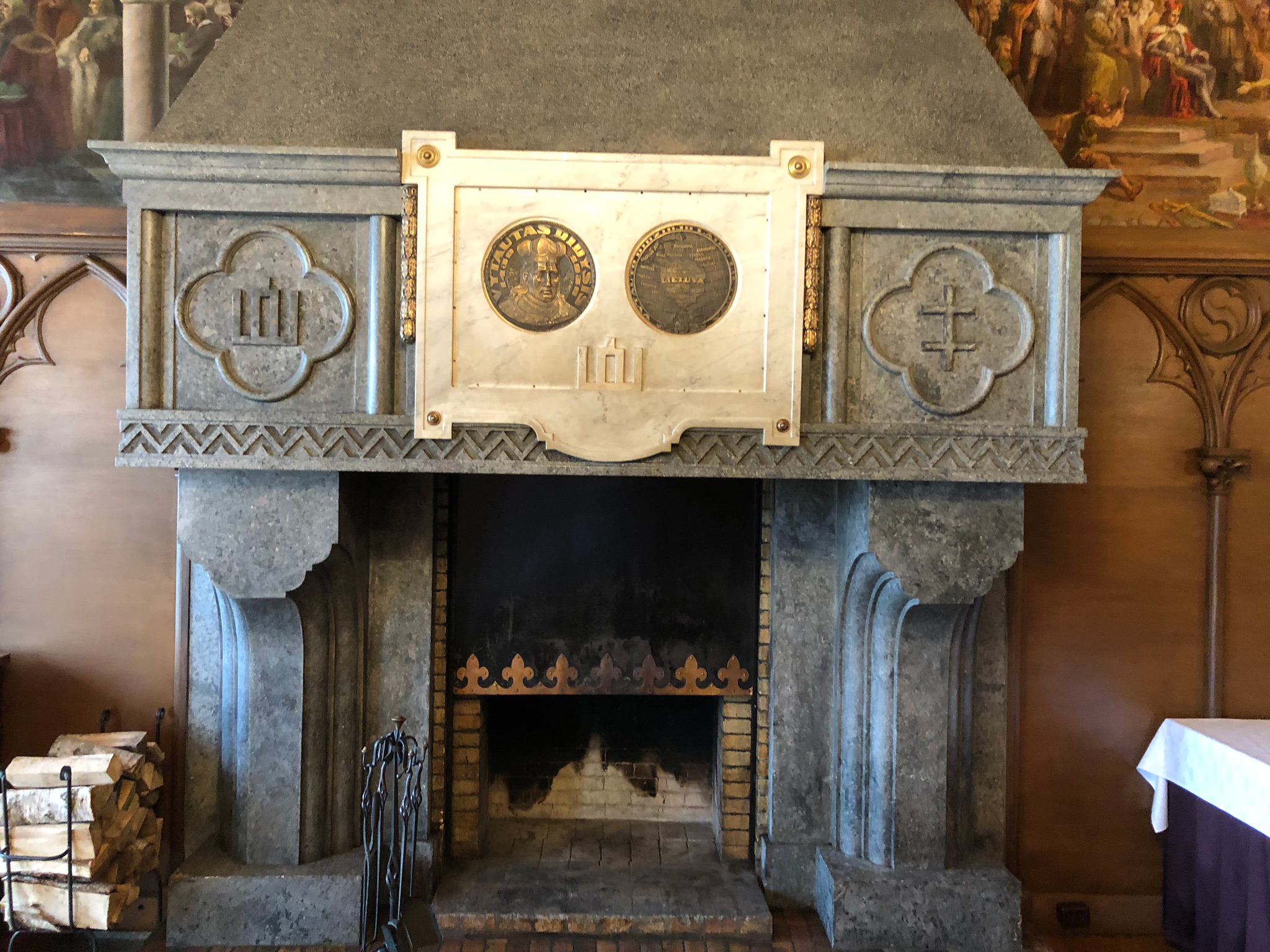

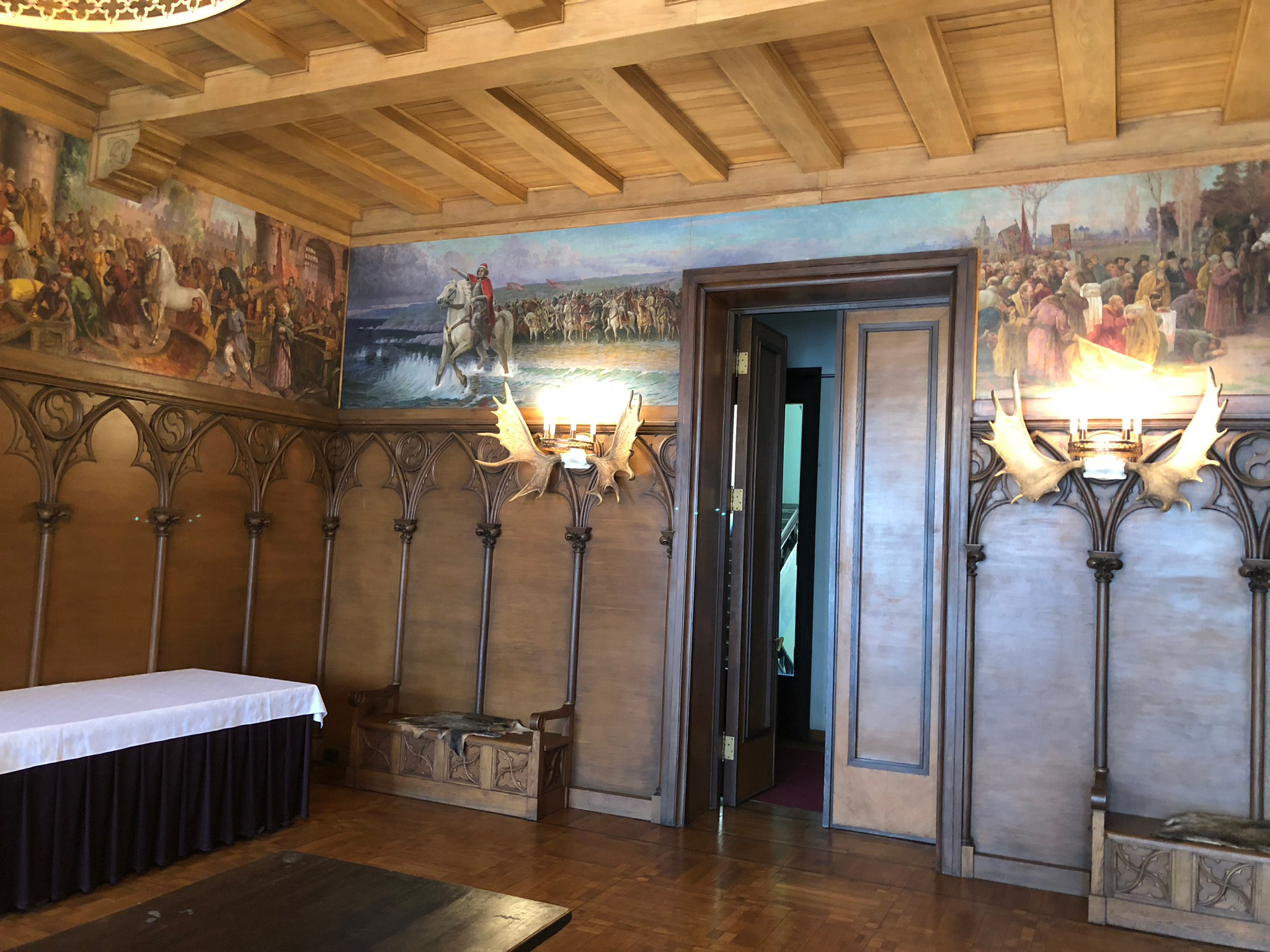

=== Presidential Chamber ===
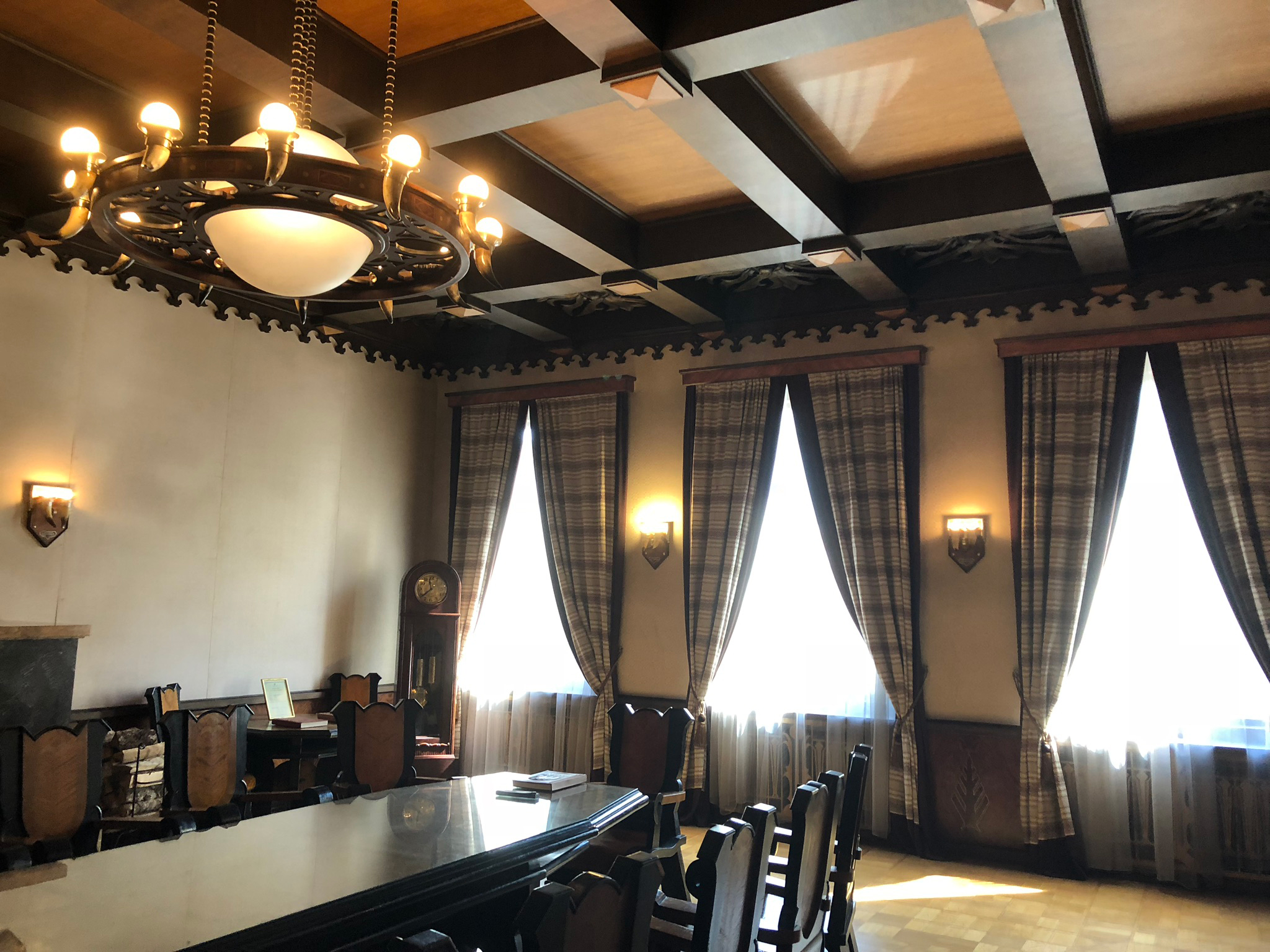
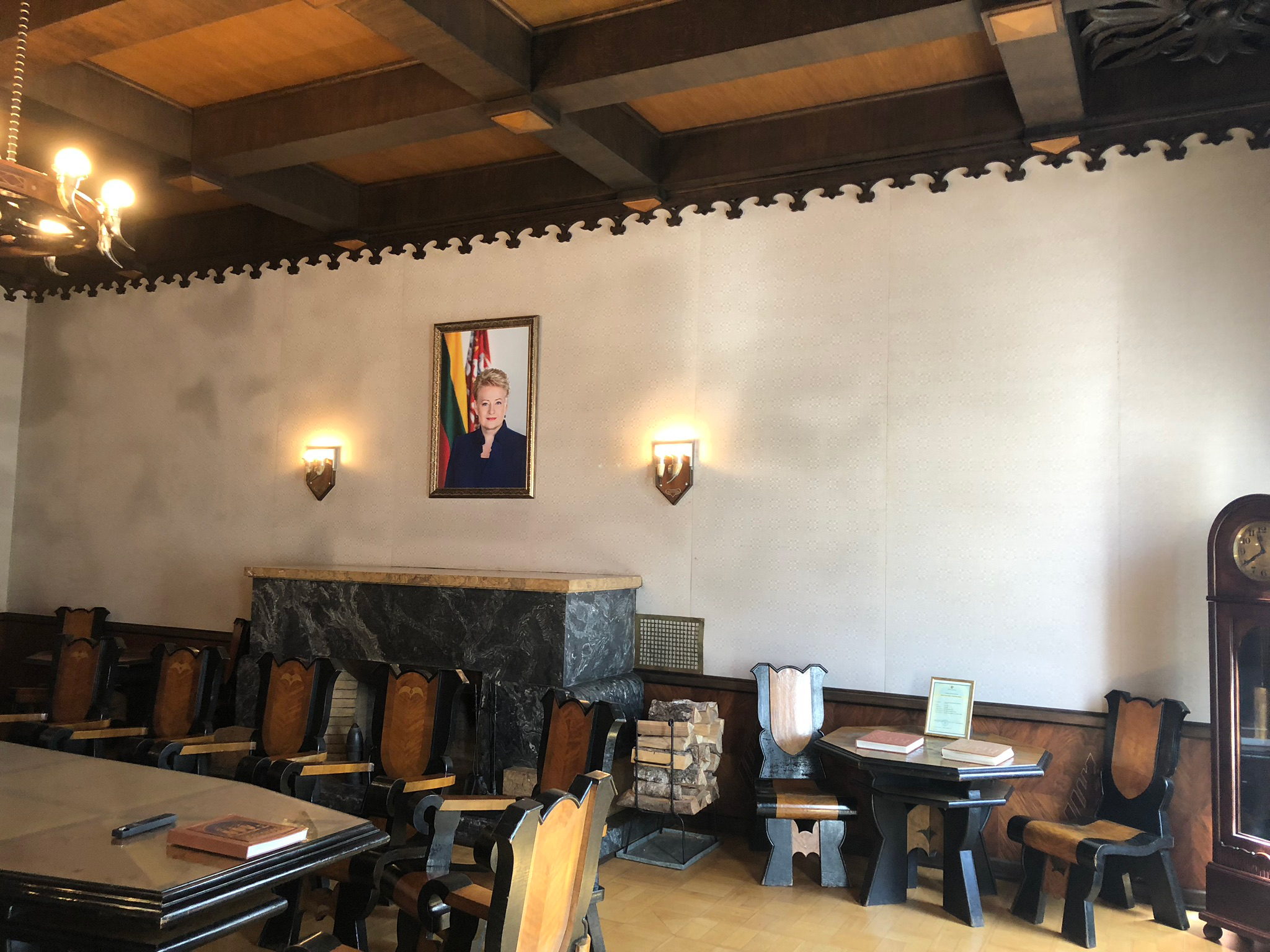
Presidential Chamber

The Presidential Chamber is decorated with the portrait of current President Dalia Grybauskaitė, who visited the chamber in 2014. A small presidential wardrobe room is located near the chamber and is intended as a dressing room for the President.

The Art Deco style chamber was created by painter Gerardas Bagdonavičius. It was designed as a symbol of Lithuania's present. The chamber has one of two fireplaces in the building; this one is made from faux black marble. The chamber is furnished with hand-carved table and chairs designed by Bagdonavičius in 1937: a conference table 4 metres (13 ft) in length, 12 armchairs, 12 chairs, 12 stools, two side tables, and a display cabinet. The room displays artillery shells from the Lithuanian Wars of Independence, linen canvas, and framed Vytis.

== Other rooms ==
=== Entrance and Trys milžinai restaurant ===
Entrance to the building has three doors, the middle ones are rotating. Near the doors there is a cloakroom. At the first floor since 1937 there is a restaurant called Trys milžinai (The Three Giants). Originally, the restaurant was attended by the Lithuanian Army officers and other high-ranking officials. From 1994 to 2025 it was a pizzeria Milano. The restaurant closed in 2025. The modern restaurant has a restored interior, colors, furniture, bar, luminaires from the inter-war times. Above the entrance to the restaurant there also is a signboard "Restoranas kavinė TRYS MILŽINAI" (English: Restaurant cafe THE THREE GIANTS).

Entrance doors from the outside

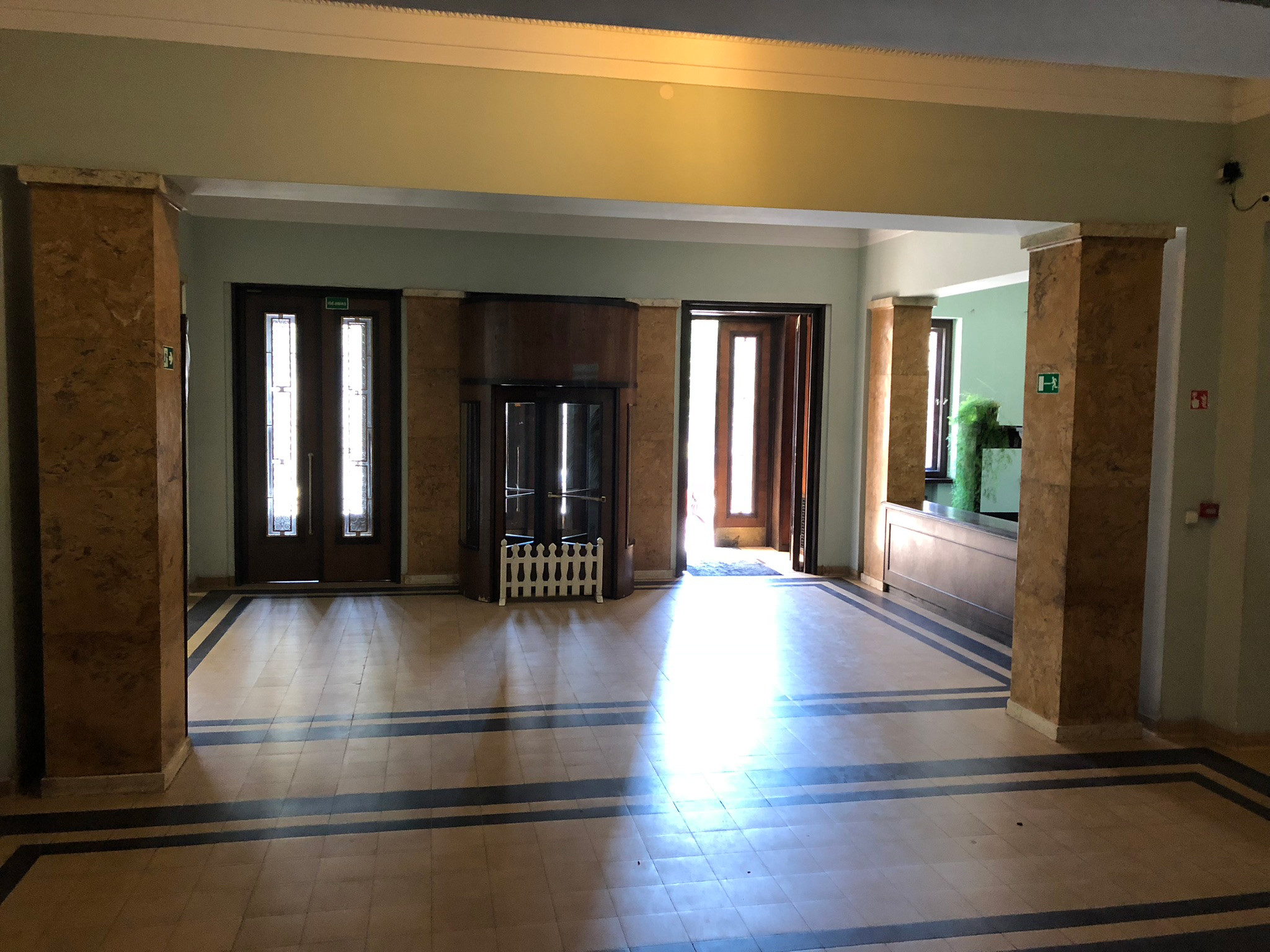
Entrance doors from the inside

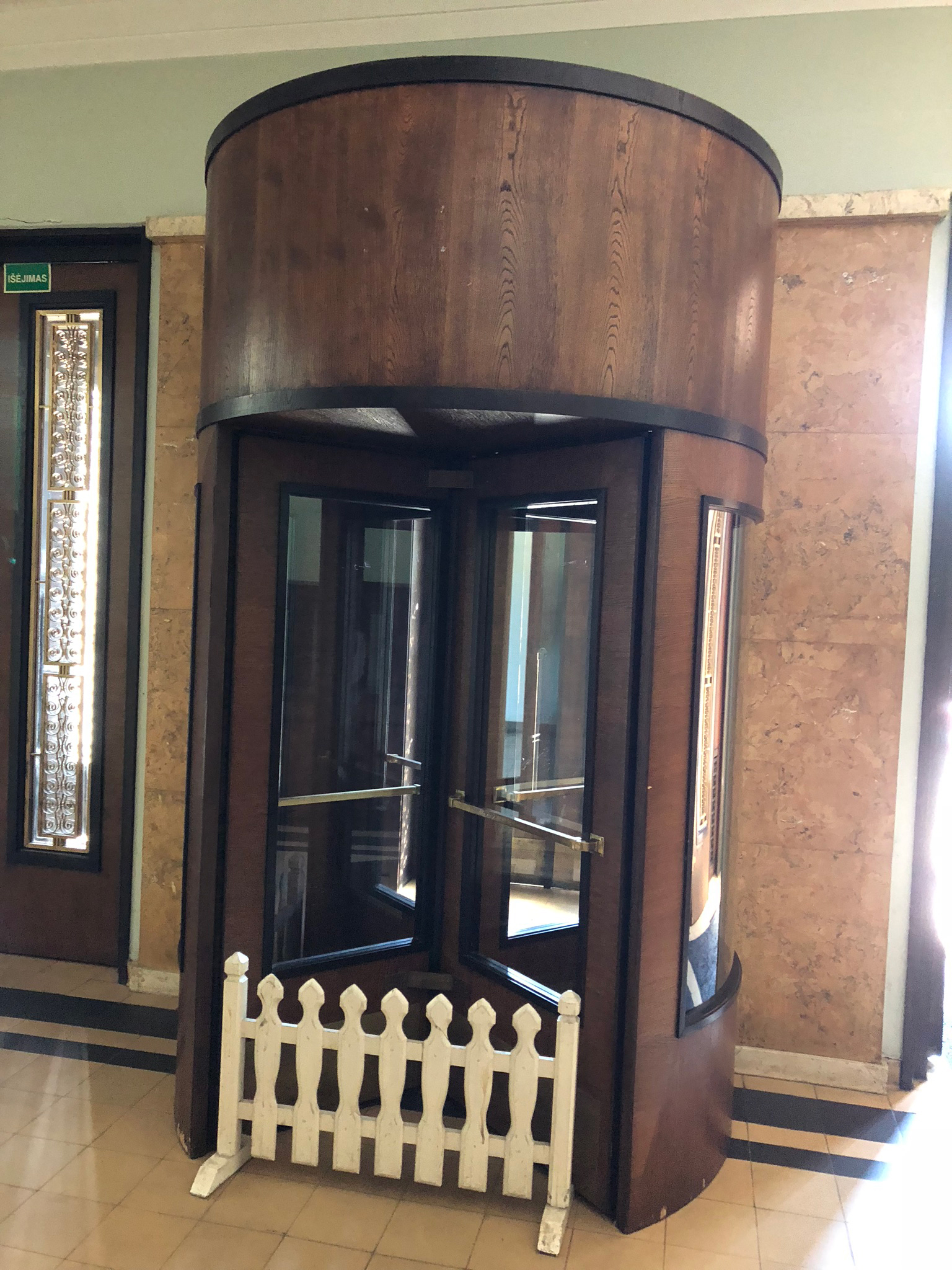
Rotating entrance doors

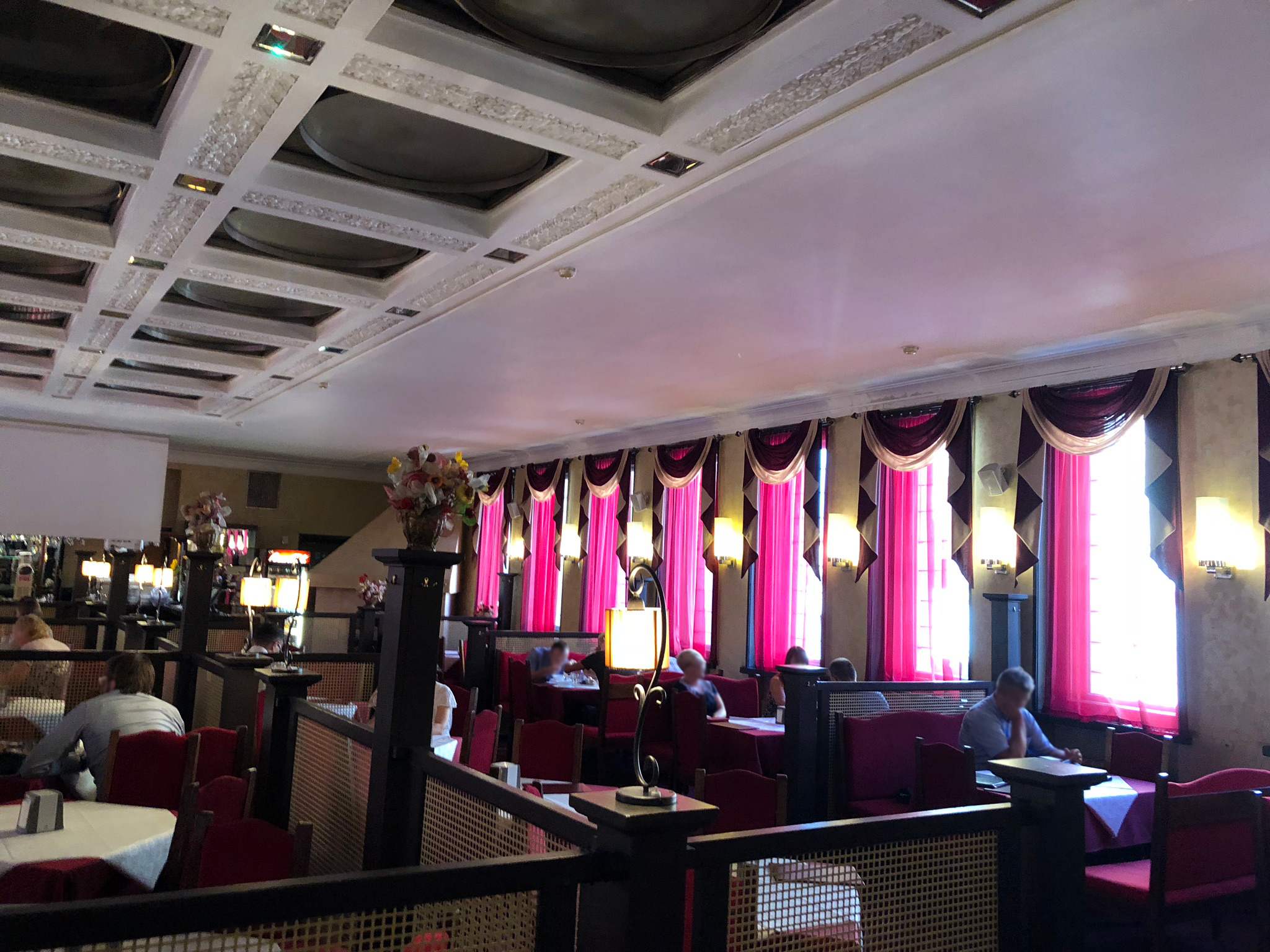
Restaurant Trys milžinai

=== Other floors ===
The office room on the first floor was the editorial office of Kardas (transl. Sword), an illustrated magazine geared towards military officers. Its editors were: Kazys Skučas, Vincas Jonuška, Petras Biržys, Jonas Asevičius-Acukas, Juozas Balčiūnas, Vytautas Steponaitis, Aleksandras Šimkus, Liudas Zibavičius. The room is now a small museum displaying authentic military items: paintings, maps, models, guns, tablecloth ironing machines, typewriter, still operating telephones and other. The most valuable exhibits are the political map of Europe made in 1924 and Vytis.

The building's elevator by the Schindler Elevator Corporation is one of the oldest still fully operational elevators in Kaunas. It still has the authentic iron scissor gate. The elevator lifts from the basement to the fourth floor not more than 450 kilograms (990 lb). On the third floor there is a library and an officers' salon, which also has a small play room for officers' children. The fourth floor is used as a hotel and also has offices of Ministry of National Defence and art collectives spaces.

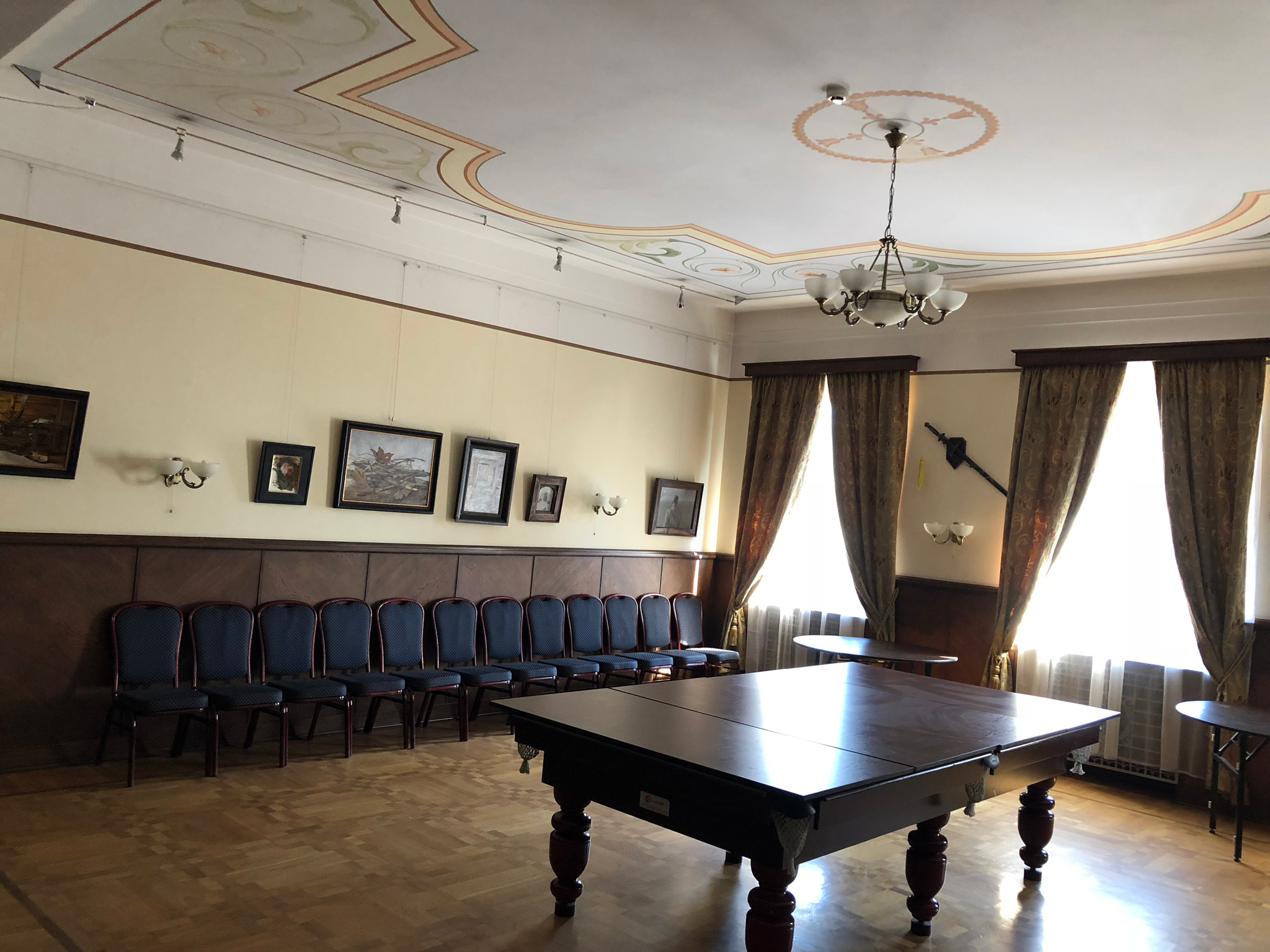
Officers' salon

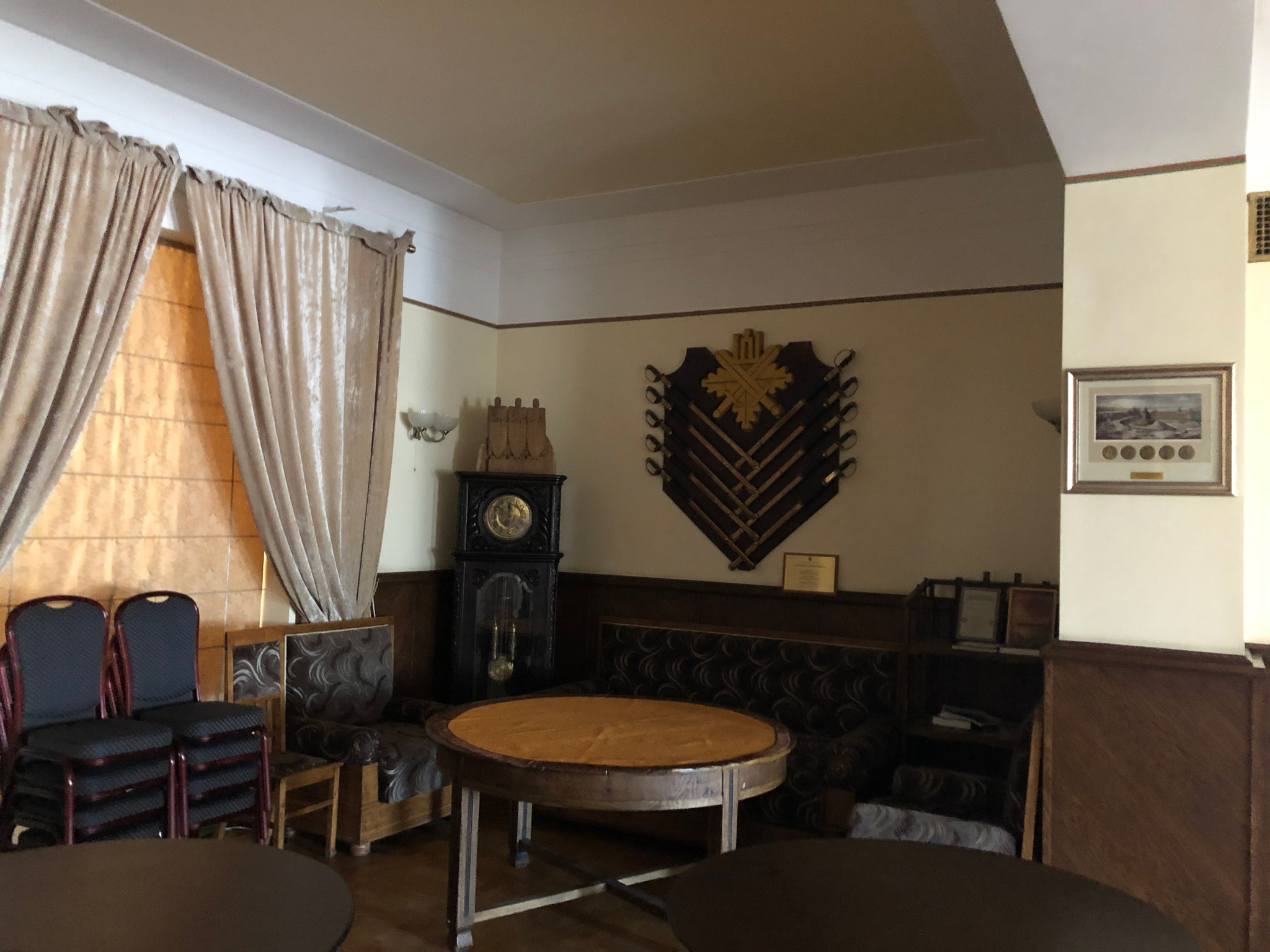
Officers' salon

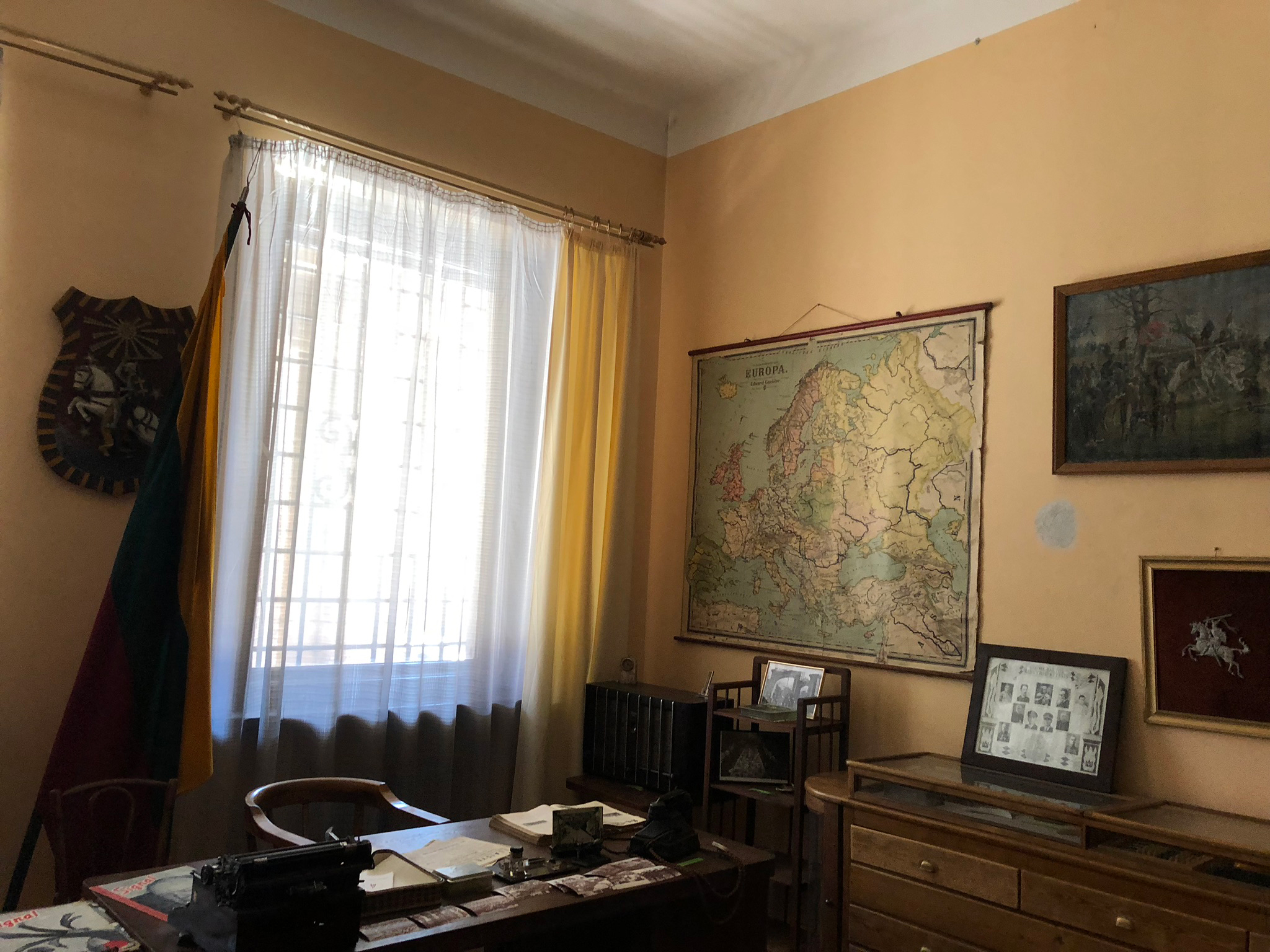
Editorial office of Kardas

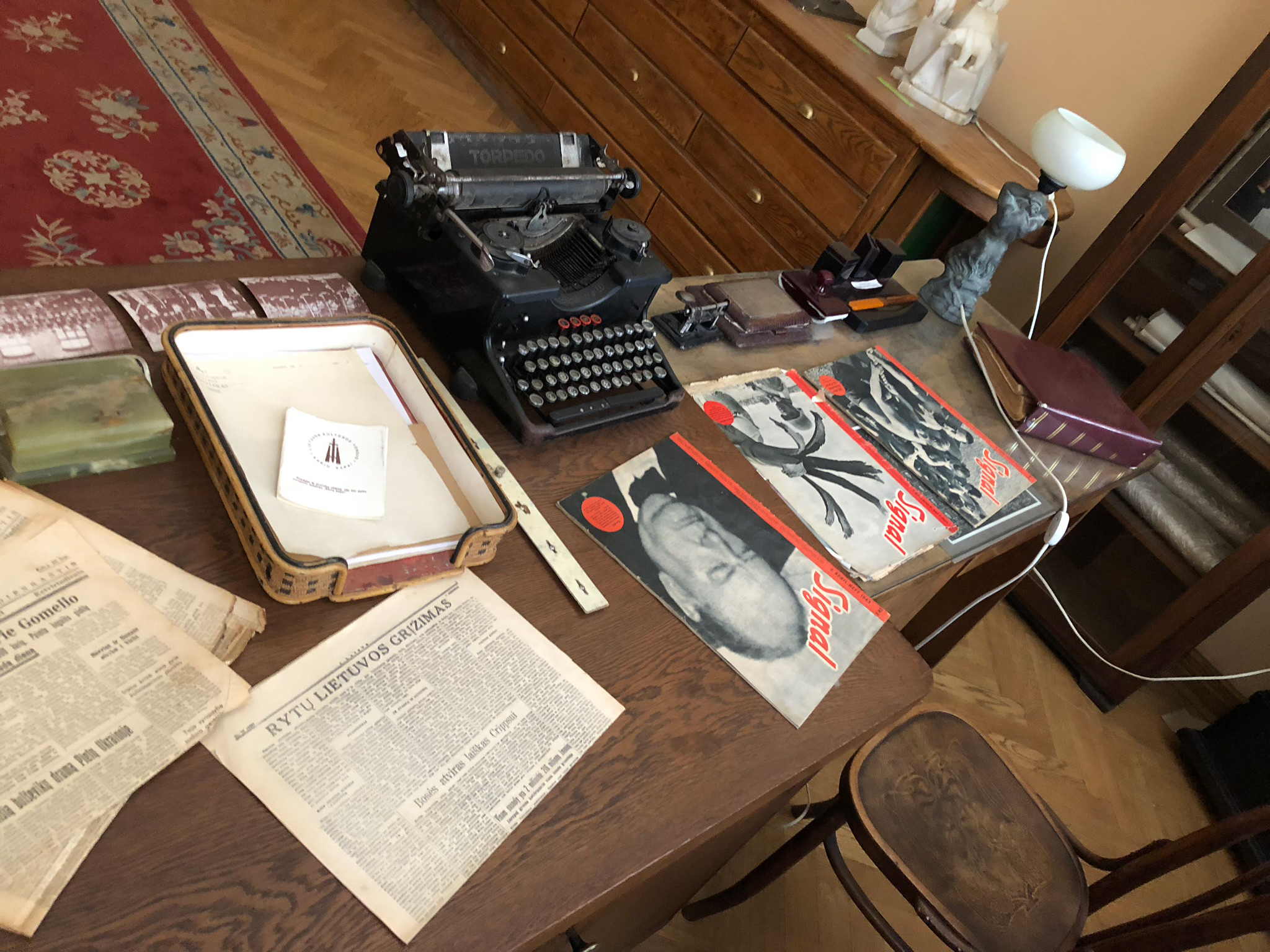
Desk of the editorial office of Kardas

=== Basement ===
The basement underwent major renovations in 2015 and a modern laser shooting room was established in April 2016. The room allows soldiers and their family members to train with pistol Glock and automatic rifle G-36 – the sound and recoil are simulated. The basement also has gym.

Another room is dedicated to the history of Lithuania and Ukraine, which presents information about the international history project Gediminaičių kelias (The Path of the Gediminids), a collaboration of ten cities in Ukraine, two in Belarus, one in Poland and the Czech Republic as well as four in Lithuania (Kaunas, Tauragė, Ukmergė, and Trakai). The room also displays information on Lubart's Castle, one of the best preserved castles of the Grand Duchy of Lithuania, and a modern reconstruction of medieval armor, which weighs 35 kilograms (77 lb). The armor is used as armor of Vytautas the Great during the annual reenactment of the Battle of Grunwald.
