= Kalpokas =

Kalpokas is a surname. Notable people with the surname include:

- Donald Kalpokas (1943–2019), Vanuatuan politician and diplomat
- Petras Kalpokas (1880–1945), Lithuanian artist and professor
