= Church of St. John the Baptist, Kvetkai =

Church of Kvetkai

Kvetkai St. John the Baptist Church
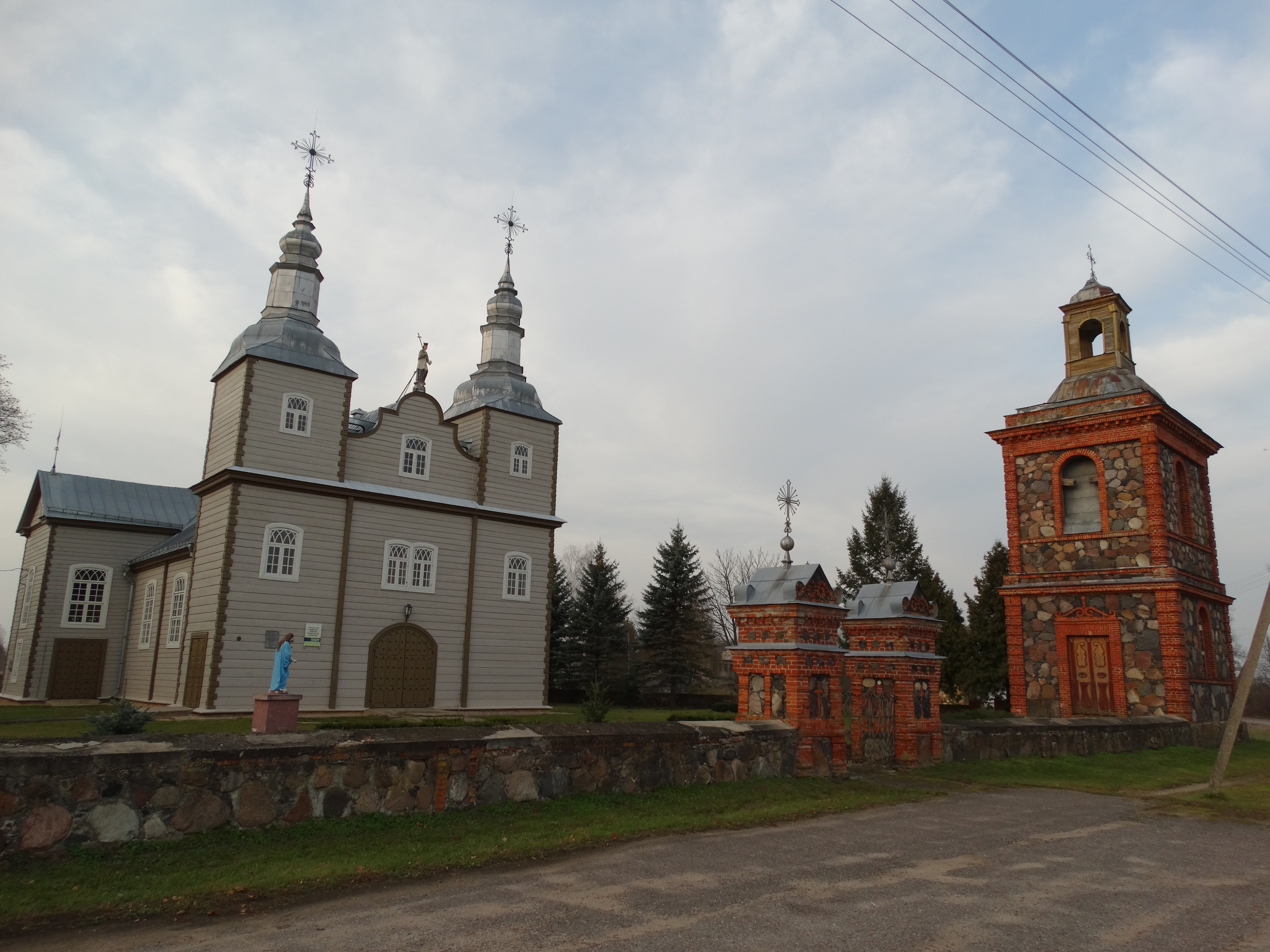

- Location within Lithuania
- 56°8′58″N 25°8′20″E
- Location: Kvetkai, Biržai District Municipality, Panevėžys County
- Country: Lithuania
- Denomination: Roman Catholic

Architecture
- Completed: 1875

Specifications
- Materials: Wood

Administration
- Diocese: Panevėžys
- Deanery: Biržai
- Parish: Kvetkai Parish of St. John the Baptist

Kvetkai St. John the Baptist Church is located in the village of Kvetkai in northern Lithuania, three kilometers from the Lithuania–Latvia border on the left bank of the Nemunėlis river. Built in 1875, the wooden church features folk architecture with some Baroque elements.

== History ==
After the parish of Kvetkai was established in 1769, Pranciškus Kamarauskas built the first church in 1772. The church was consecrated in 1777 by bishop Feliksas Jonas Tovianskis. The parsonage was constructed in 1848 and other living quarters of the parish in 1884.

In 1875 the church was rebuilt, expanded and a new bell tower was erected in 1880.

The church was plundered during World War I and three bells (weighing 100 kg, 200 kg and 300 kg) were taken to Germany. Pastor Povilas Šalučkas oversaw the purchase of two new bells (weighing 102 kg and 175 kg) in 1932.

== Gallery ==
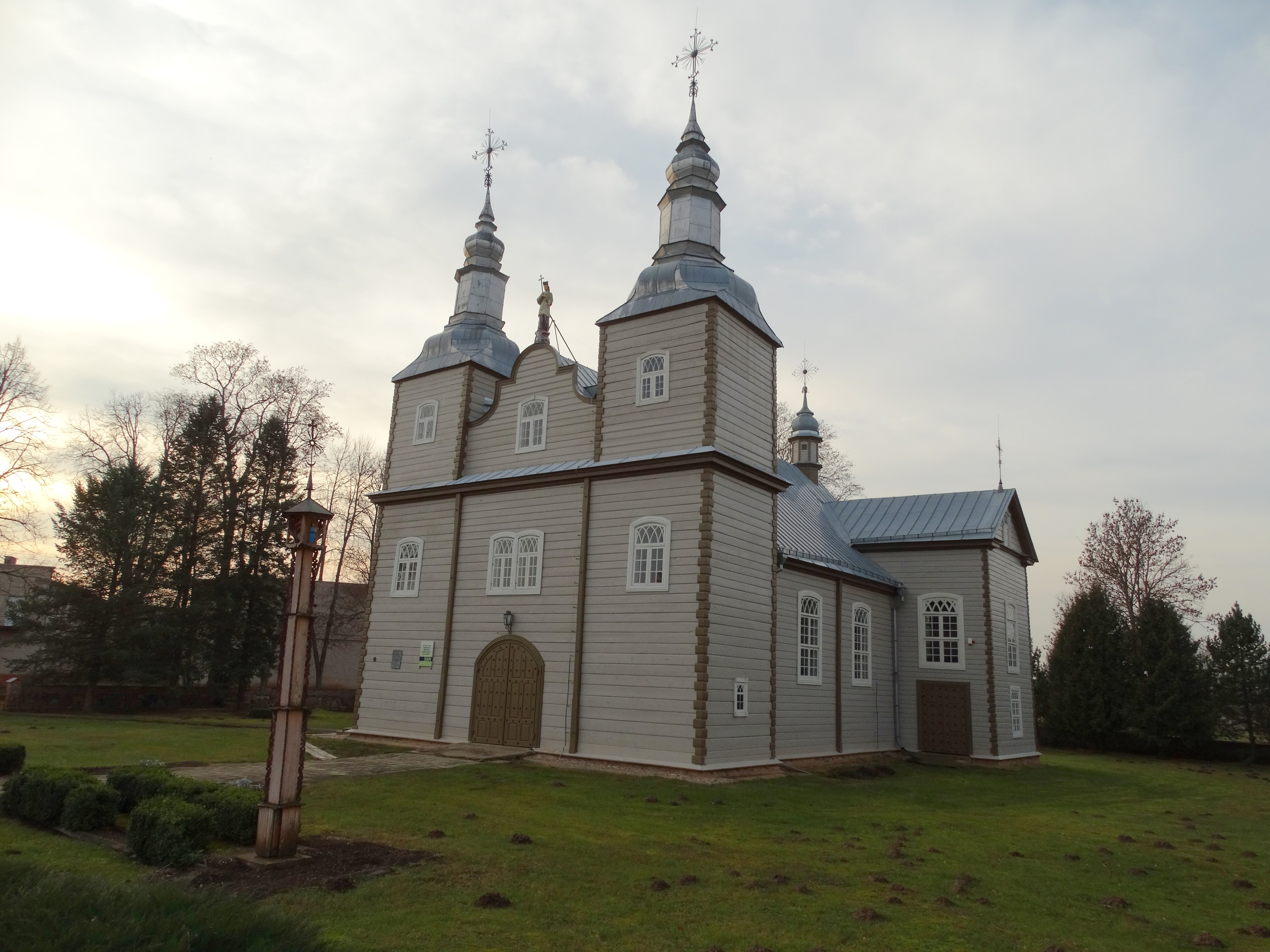
Front view of Kvetkai Church

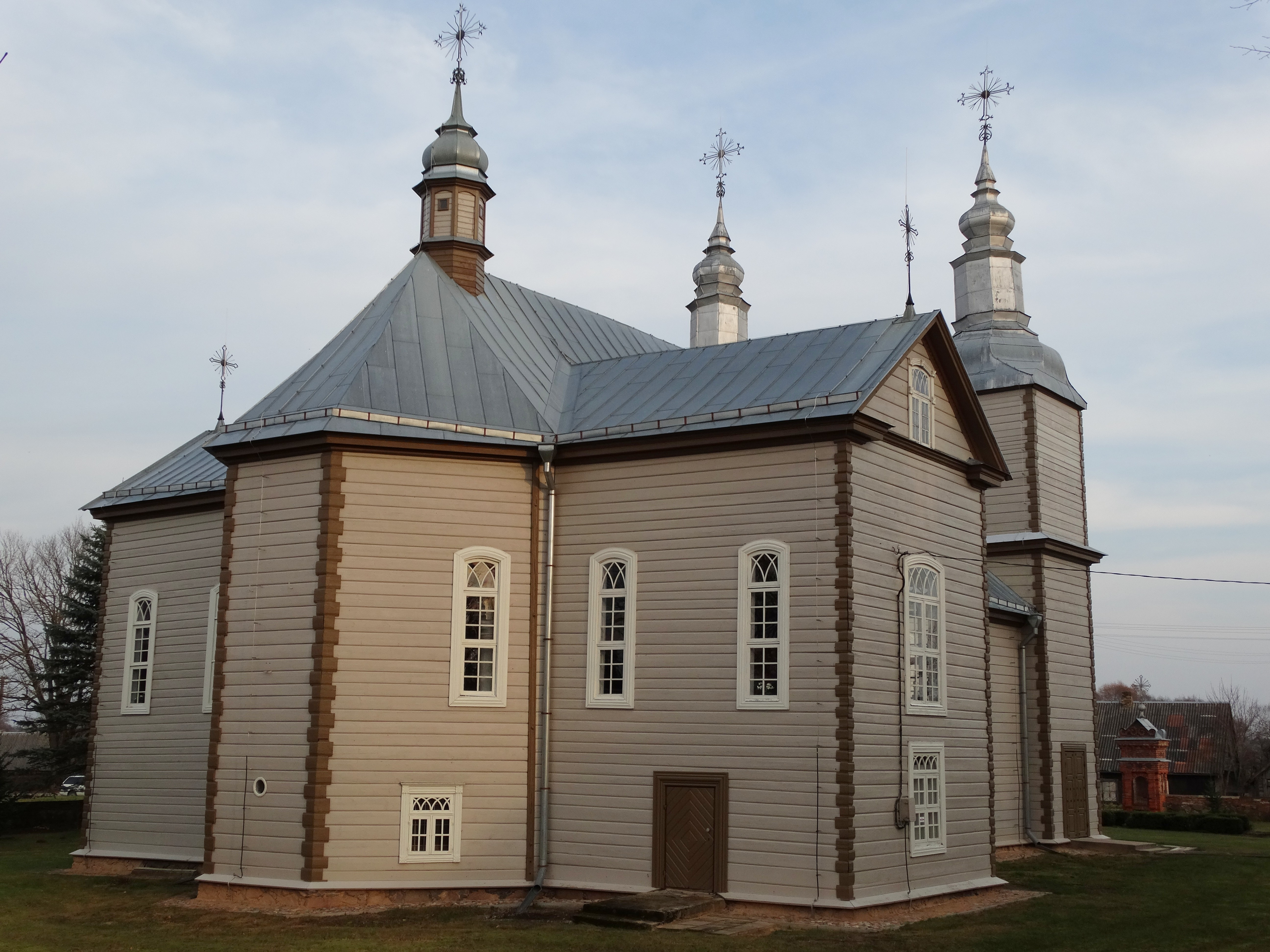
Back view of Kvetkai Church

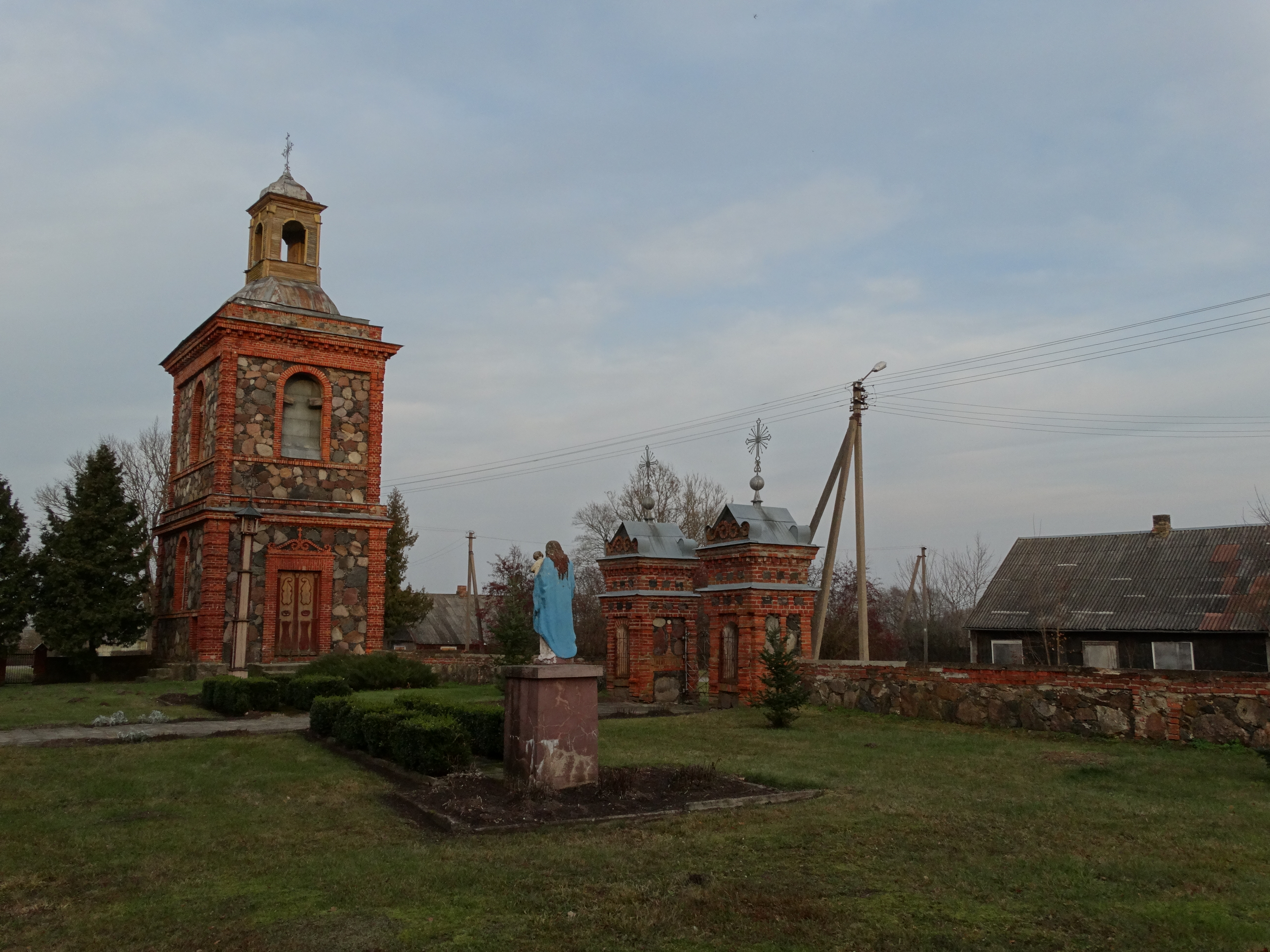
Churchyard of Kvetkai Church

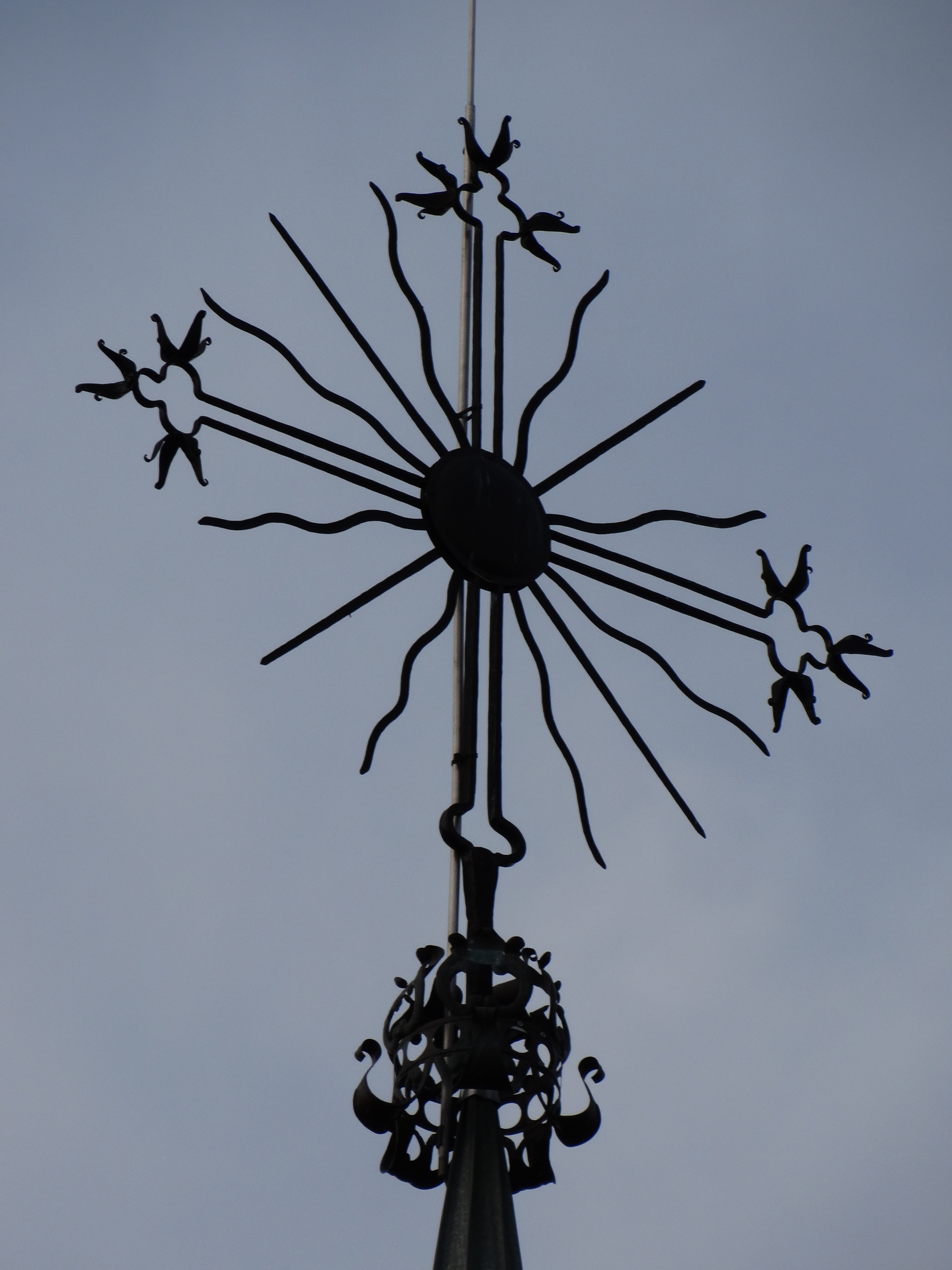
Cross on the tower of Kvetkai Church
