= Kvetkai =

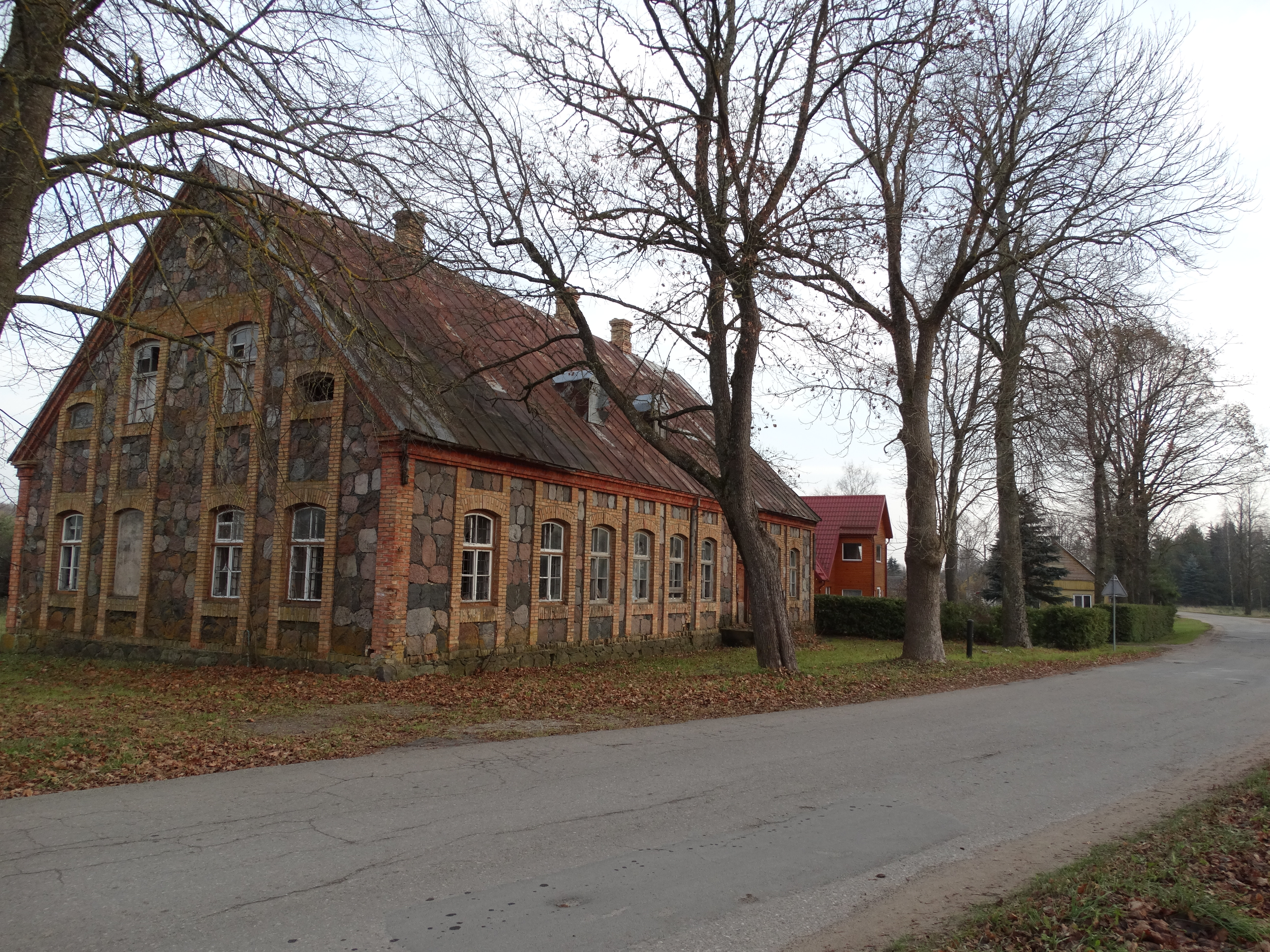
- Kvetkai village, Latvia

- Location of Kvetkai
- Coordinates: 56°08′N 25°08′E
- Country: Lithuania
- Ethnographic region: Aukštaitija
- County: Panevėžys County
- Municipality: Biržai district municipality
- Eldership: Papilys elderate
- First mentioned: 1647

Population (2011)
  - Total: 244
- Time zone: UTC+2 (EET)
  - Summer (DST): UTC+3 (EEST)

Kvetkai is a village in Biržai district municipality, northern Lithuania. It is located about 3 km away from the border with Latvia. Nemunėlis flows through the village.

It has a wooden St. John the Baptist Church (1772) and a primary school established in 1835.

== Famous people ==
- Petras Kalpokas
