= Vladimiras Dubeneckis =

Lithuanian architect and painter

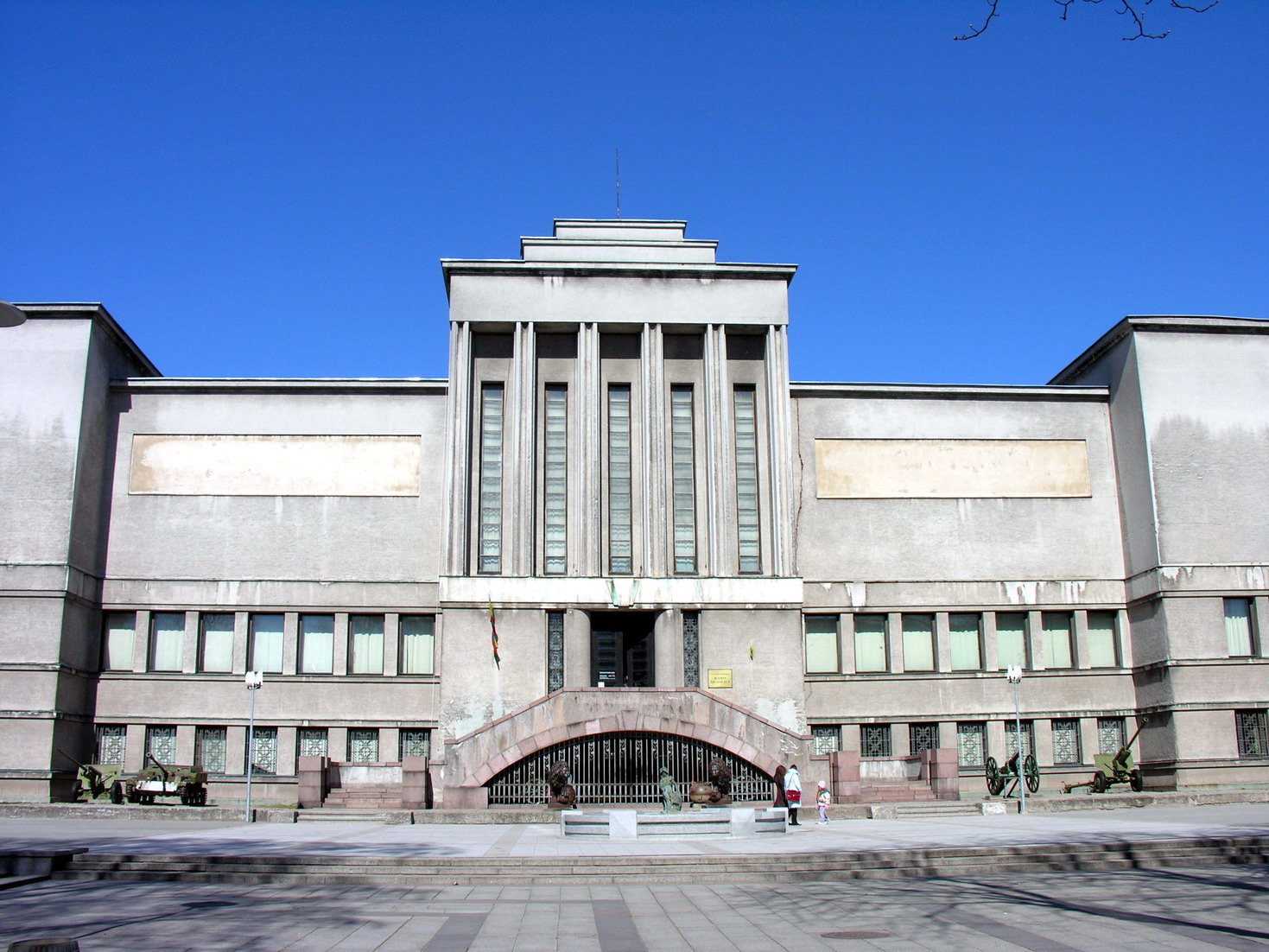
Vytautas Magnus War Museum in Kaunas

Vladimiras Dubeneckis (6 September 1888 – 10 August 1932) was a Lithuanian architect and painter.

He studied at the Imperial Academy of Arts under Leon Benois, and became a professor of the academy in 1917. He was also a professor at the Kaunas Art School.

== See also ==
- List of Lithuanian painters
