= Petras Kalpokas =

Lithuanian artist

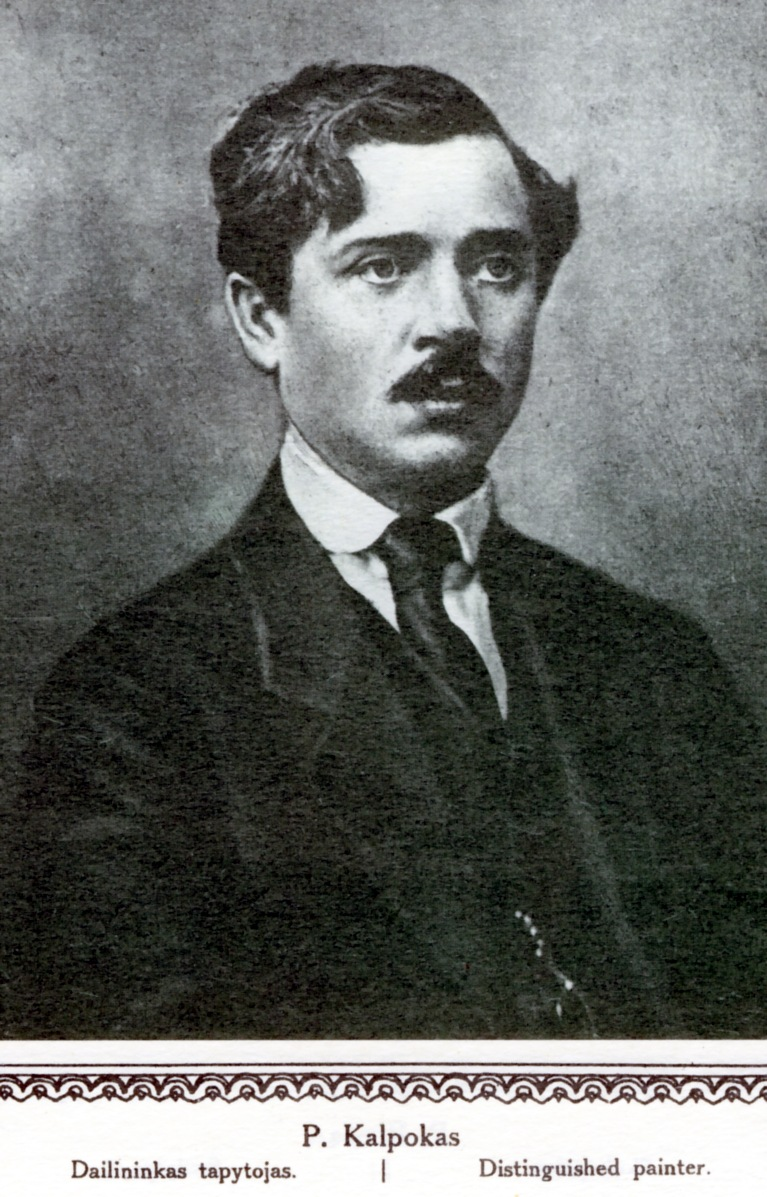
Petras Kalpokas.

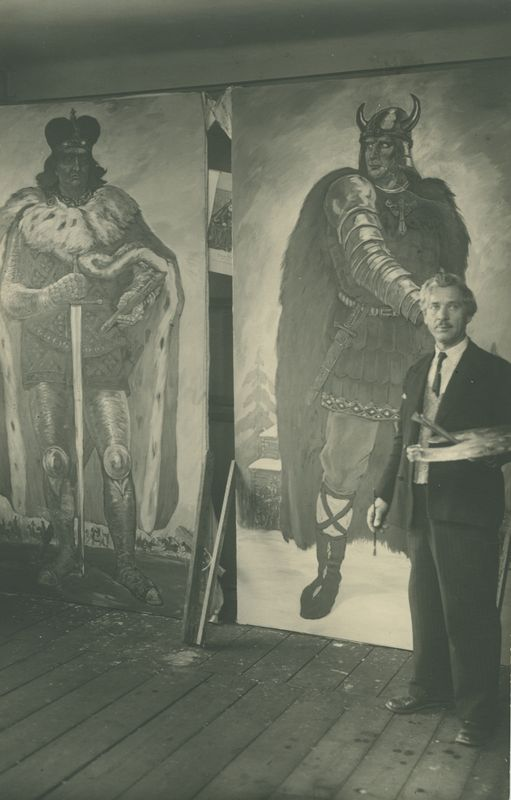
Kalpokas near his Grand Dukes of Lithuania paintings, dedicated to the Kaunas Garrison Officers' Club Building Dukes' Hall in 1937

Petras Kalpokas (31 March 1880 in Miškinė – 5 December 1945) was a Lithuanian artist and professor.

== Biography ==
Kalpokas was born on 31 March 1880 in the village of Miškinė, near Kvetkai, in the Kovno Governorate of the Russian Empire (in the Biržai district of present-day Lithuania).

From 1890 to 1895, he attended the Gymnasium of Jelgava, Latvia. He was expelled when he drew a teacher's cartoon on a stove.

In 1898, Kalpokas moved to Odessa where he spent two years as an art student. In 1890 (?), he received a bronze medal for his still life painting. In 1892, the first exhibition of Kalpokas' drawings was organized in Riga. Kalpokas continued his studies of arts in Munich. He studied under guidance of Anton Ažbe and Wilhelm von Debschitz. Kalpokas attended Heimann Academy and the Ludwig-Maximilians-Universität München.

Between 1909 and 1920, Kalpokas traveled around Europe: Switzerland, Hungary, Italy. In 1914, he attempted to organize a large one-man exhibition in Germany, but more than 120 of his paintings were lost due to World War I. After he returned to Lithuania, Kalpokas began teaching. First lecturing at drawing courses, established by Justinas Vienožinskis, he later taught at Kaunas Art School. In 1928, Kalpokas held a large personal exhibition in Kaunas. In 1930, he published a textbook on painting techniques and in 1945 became a professor.

== Works ==
Most of Kalpokas' works are landscapes and portraits, but he experimented with diverse genres (still life, thematic composition, theatrical scenery, monumental painting) and techniques (oil, watercolor, tempera, fresco). Landscapes of Kalpokas are lyric. Some of them are realistic, others have features of impressionism. His portraits are psychological and precise, while frescoes - decorative and dynamic. Among noted works by Kalpokas are:

- The Golden Birch Tree (1907)
- Rivulet in Spring (1907)
- Sylvan way (1912)
- The landscape of Switzerland (1915)
- Wind from the Sea (1942)
- Portrait of Jurgis Šlapelis (1924)
- Portrait of Jonas Jablonskis (1938)
- Portrait of Salomeja Neris (1945)
- Amasone (1933)
- Forest and Cloud (1926)
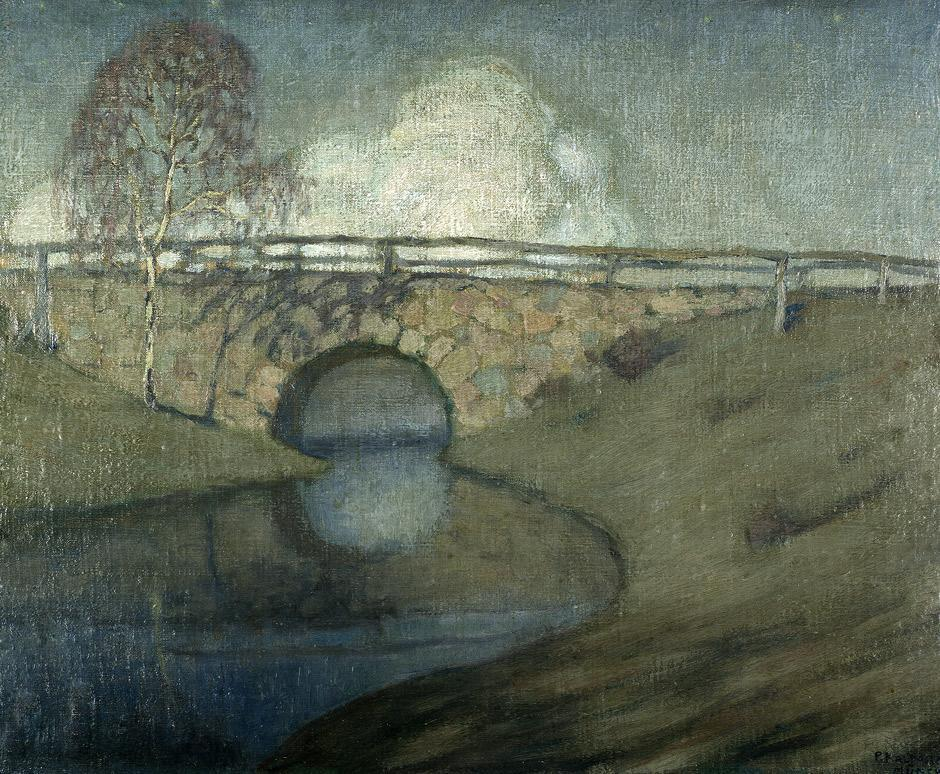
The Bridge in the Moonlight (1906)

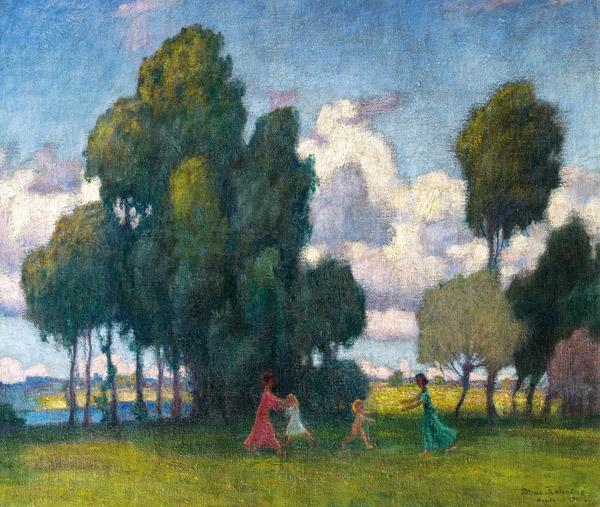
Summer Day (1911)

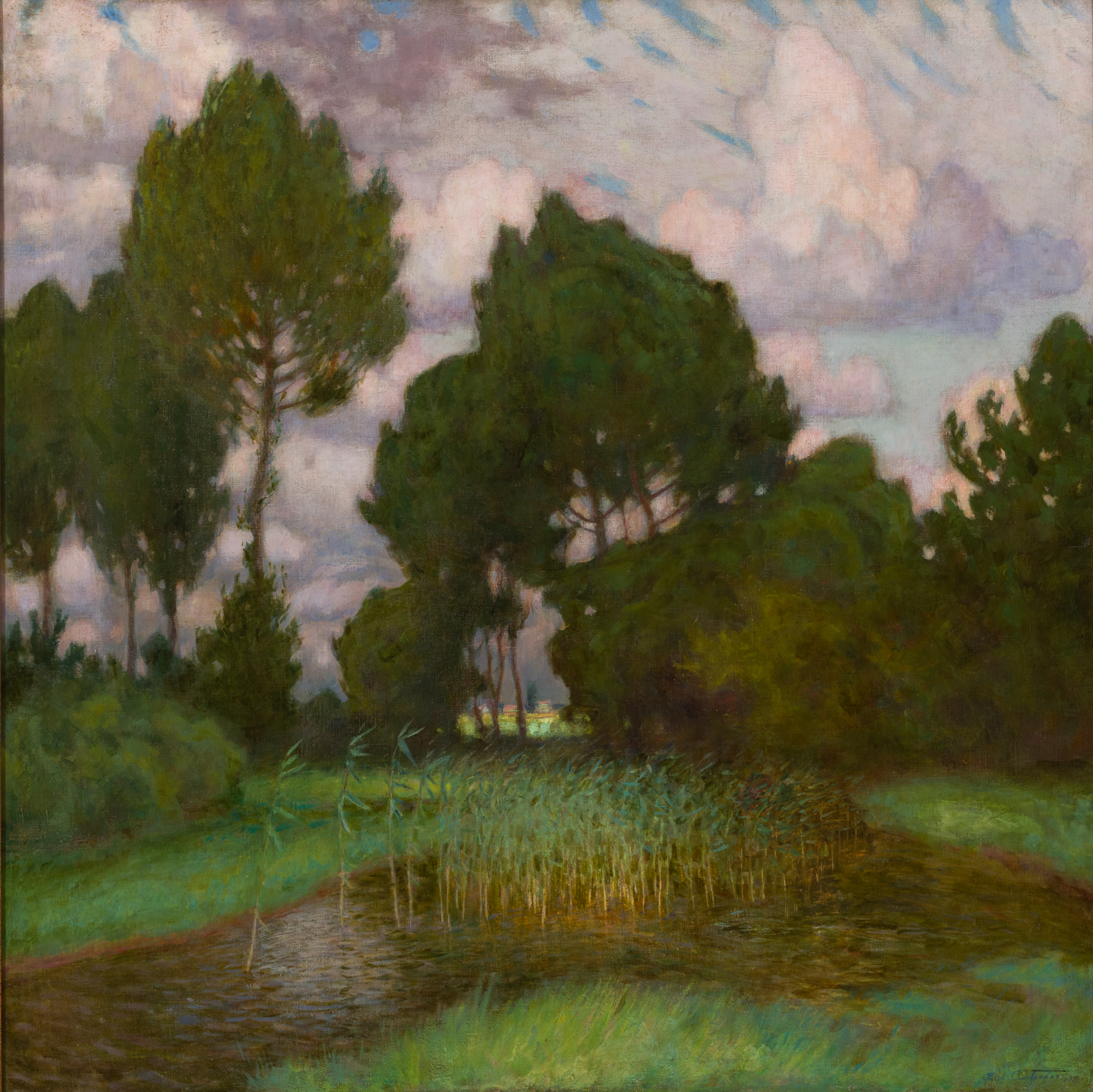
Untitled (1911)

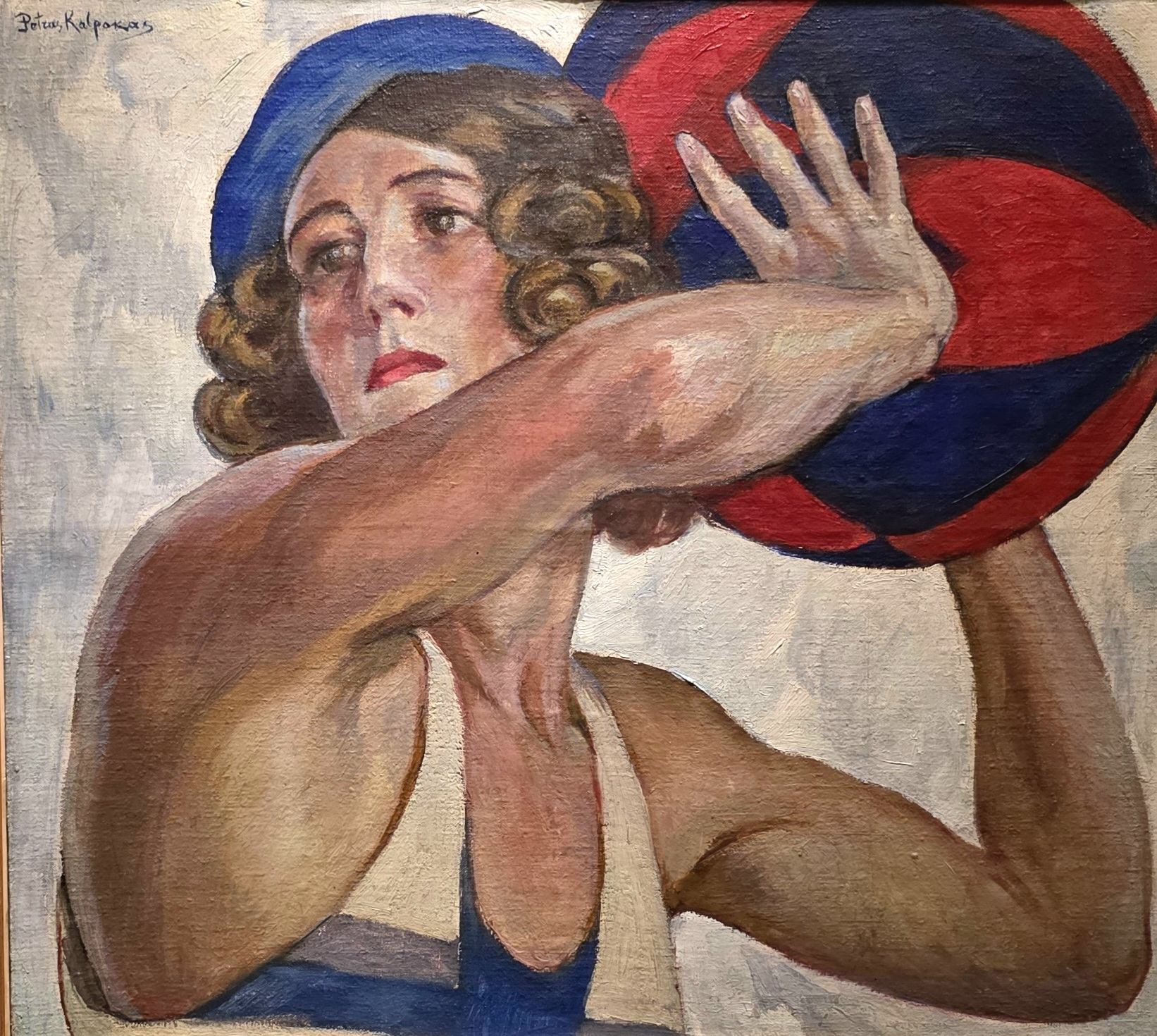
Woman with Ball (around 1933)

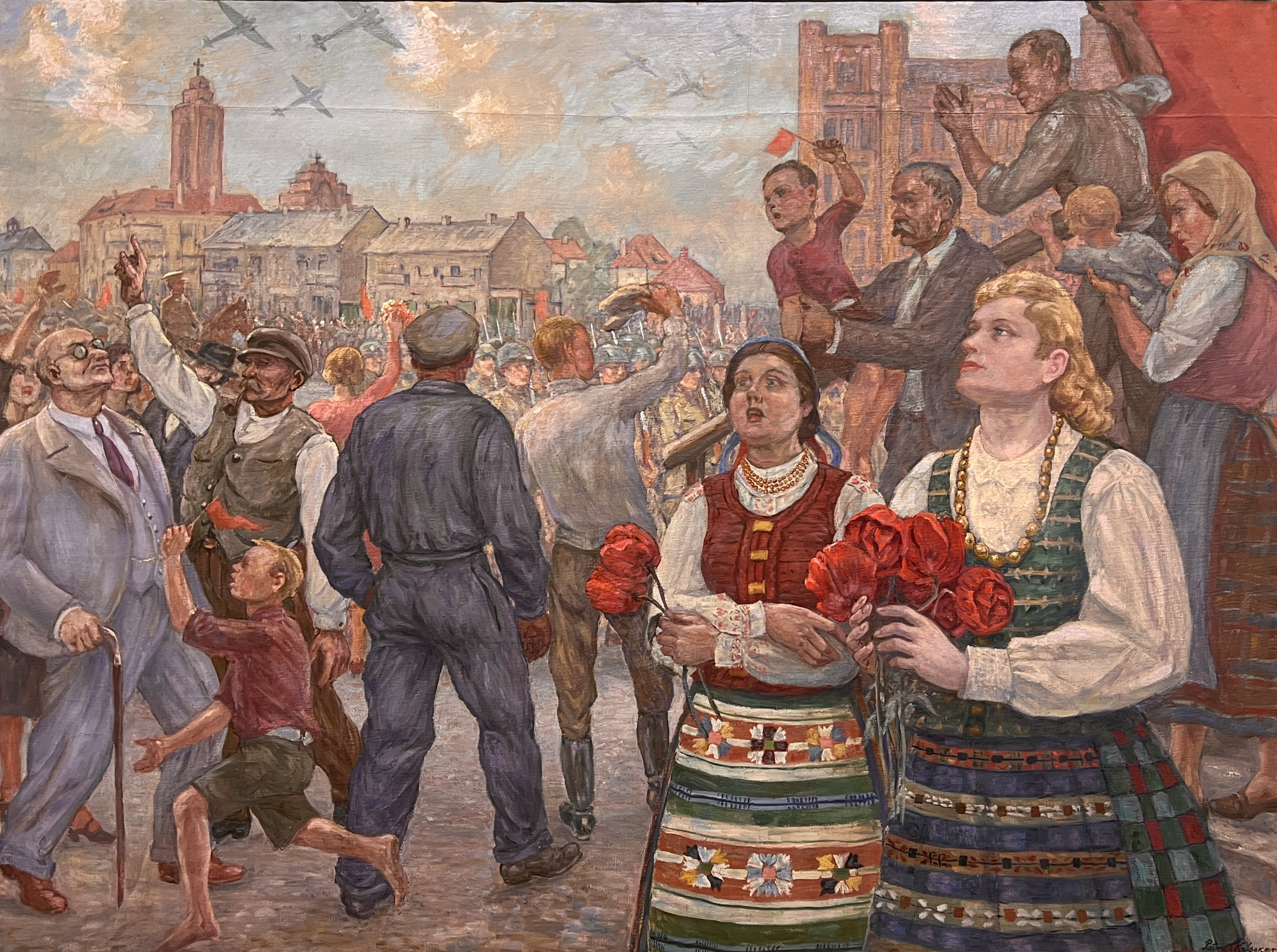
The Red Army Enters the City of Kaunas (1945)
