= Jonas Acus-Acukas =

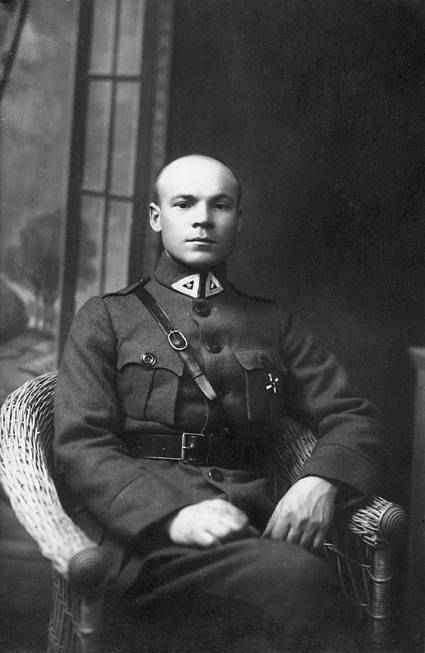
Jonas Asevičius-Acukas in 1921

Jonas Asevicius-Acus-Acukas (July 29, 1885 in Jieznas – July 11, 1976 in Kaunas) was a Lithuanian army officer and chemist. From 1909 to 1918, he served in the Imperial Russian Army at Kaunas Fortress. He fought in the First World War and the Russian Civil War. In 1921 he returned to Lithuania and was mobilized into the Lithuanian Armed Forces, where he attained the rank of colonel (1927) and served until 1940. Acus graduated from Vytautas Magnus University in 1930. He lectured on chemistry and commodity science at Vytautas Magnus University (1934–1940), Vilnius University (1940–1950), and Lithuanian University of Agriculture (1951–1957). He wrote textbooks on foundations of commodity science (1949) and a short course in physical chemistry (1957). Acus was awarded the Commander's Crosses of the Order of Vytautas the Great (1938) and the Order of the Lithuanian Grand Duke Gediminas (1928).
