= 1972 unrest in Lithuania =

- Part of the occupation of the Baltic states
- Date: May 18-May 19, 1972
- Location: Kaunas, Lithuanian SSR, USSR
- Also known as: Kaunas' Spring
- Participants: Lithuanian high school students, workers
- Outcome: the numbers of injured protesters unknown at least five militsiya officers injured 50 people faced civil charges, ten people faced criminal persecution

1972 unrest in Lithuanian SSR, sometimes titled as Kaunas' Spring, took place on May 18–19, 1972, in Kaunas, Lithuania, Soviet Union. It was sparked by the self-immolation of a 19-year-old student named Romas Kalanta in protest against the Soviet regime and the subsequent ban authorities imposed on members of the public attending Kalanta's funeral. As a result, thousands of young demonstrators gathered in the central street of Kaunas, Laisvės Alėja in anti-government protests that started on May 18 and were suppressed by Soviet troops on May 19.

== The wave of protests ==
On May 14, 1972, a 19-year-old high school student named Romas Kalanta poured three liters of gasoline on himself and set himself on fire in the square adjoining Laisvės Alėja in front of the Kaunas Musical Theatre where, in 1940, the People's Seimas had declared the establishment of the Lithuanian Soviet Socialist Republic. Before his suicide, Kalanta left a notebook with a brief note that read "blame only the regime for my death". It was only in 1990, when Lithuania declared its independence, that the contents of this note became publicly known.

Kalanta died fourteen hours later in hospital. On May 18, the Soviet authorities brought Kalanta's burial forward by two hours to prevent publicity. However, it provoked even bigger outrage among the gathered people, mostly high school students and young workers and developed into a politically charged riot, which was forcibly dispersed by KGB, militsiya, and Internal Troops. A spontaneous rally resulted in the disruption of traffic in the city centre, as well as four shop windows being smashed, five Militsiya officers injured and one Militsiya motorcycle burnt.

The next day, about 3,000 people marched along Laisvės Alėja, of which 402 were arrested. The New York Times reported numerous injuries and one death among Soviet troops.

Of the arrested, over half were under 20 years old and about a quarter belonged to the youth branch of the Communist Party. In an effort to distract from the political nature of the protests, the arrested people were charged with hooliganism. 50 people faced civil charges, while ten faced criminal prosecution. Eventually, eight people were sentenced to between one and two years in prison. Demonstrations spread to other cities in the Lithuanian SSR as well, and altogether 108 people were arrested.

These mass demonstrations were on a scale that had not been seen since 1956 and were ultimately suppressed by squads of KGB, Militsiya and Internal Troops.

== Aftermath ==
Public agitation continued throughout 1972 and 1973 as the KGB registered 3–4 times more various anti-Soviet incidents. Lithuania recorded 13 other suicides by fire in 1972, including 24-year-old V. Stonys in Varėna on May 29, 60-year-old A. Andriuškevičius in Kaunas on June 3, 62-year-old Zališauskas on June 10, and 40-year-old Juozapas Baracevičius in Šiauliai on June 22.

The crackdown on demonstrations was followed by increased censorship, and youth organisations and gatherings came under more thorough surveillance. Lithuanian SSR officials blamed "so-called followers of the hippie movement" for organising the riots.

There were some rallies by the Lithuanian diaspora in other countries, such as the United States, in support of the demonstrations. The political émigré Vytautas Alantas published a book dedicated to the events under the title Romas Kalanta: The Living Torches in the Nemunas Valley.

== Commemoration of events ==
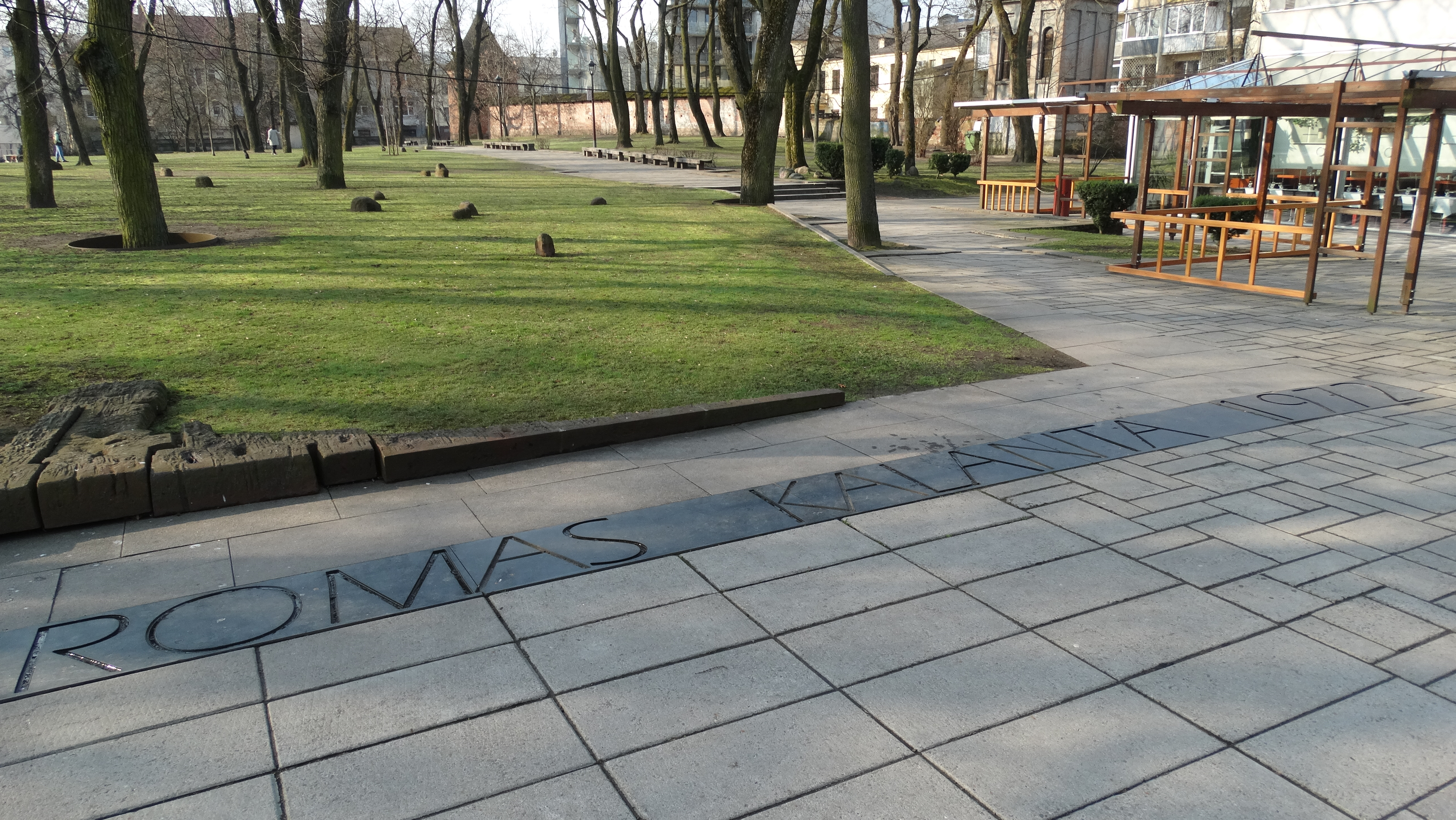
A monument for Romas Kalanta at the place where he set himself on fire.

The day when Romas Kalanta died and the subsequent demonstrations are called "kalantinės" and is observed annually in Kaunas. There is a monument for Romas Kalanta at the place where he self-immolated.

== In the popular culture ==
A 1990 Lithuanian drama film The Children from the Hotel America depicts some scenes from the Kaunas' demonstrations. A 2017 Lithuanian drama film Emilija contains a self-immolation scene, the course of events in the city centre and the subsequent crackdown by the militsia.

== Notable participants ==
- Vytautas Kaladė, anti-Soviet activist; one of the most active members of the protests, who was imprisoned
- Algirdas Vaclovas Patackas, a Member of the Seimas, one of the signatories of the Act of the Re-Establishment of the State of Lithuania
