= Grybas =

Grybas is a surname. Notable people with the surname include:

- Clinton Grybas (1975–2008), Australian sports commentator
- Vincas Grybas (1890–1941), Lithuanian sculptor
