= Faustas =

Faustas is a masculine given name. Notable people with the name include:

- Faustas Latėnas (1956–2020), Lithuanian composer and diplomat
- Faustas Steponavičius (born 2004), Lithuanian football forward
