= Borys Krylov =

Ukrainian sculptor

- Born: 1976 (age 49–50); Budapest, Hungary
- Education: Ukrainian Academy of Art
- Known for: Sculpture
- Website: www.tms.kiev.ua

Borys Yuriyovich Krylov (Ukrainian: Борис Юрійович Крилов, born 6 August 1976) is a Ukrainian sculptor, a member of the National Union of Artists of Ukraine (since 2012), and a member of the Royal Society of Sculptors (since 2010).

== Life ==
Borys Krylov was born on 6 August 1976, in Hungary.

From 1993 to 1999, he studied at the National Academy of Fine Arts and Architecture under the direction of Valery Shvetsov.

Since 1999, he has been working in collaboration with Oles Sidoruk.

In 2001, he won third place at Interyear 2001, their second all-Ukrainian competition, for his work on the "Ra" night club complex.

In 2011, along with Oles Sidoruk, he was awarded the title of "Honorary Citizen of Vyshhorod" for creating the sculptural complex dedicated to Holy Martyrs Saint Boris and Gleb.

Borys Krylov currently works out of Kyiv.

== Works ==
=== Monumental sculpture ===
- Monument to Liubomyr Huzar
- Freedom Warrior Monument. 2018. Kaunas, Lithuania.
- Monument dedicated to Taras Shevchenko. 2014. Kyiv, Ukraine.
- Monument to soldiers who fought on the Eastern Front during WWII. 2013. Donetsk, Ukraine.
- Monument dedicated to Spyridon of Trimythus. 2012. Crimea, Ukraine.
- Monument to Kyiv Princes Boris and Gleb. 2011. Vyshhorod, Kyiv region, Ukraine.
- Monument to Ukrainian Hetman Pylyp Orlyk. 2011. Kristianstad, Sweden.
- Monument dedicated to the heroes of Chernobyl. 2011. Kolonschyna, Kyiv region, Ukraine.
- Monument dedicated to Prince Sviatoslav. 2008. Starі Petrіvtsі, Kyiv region, Ukraine.
- Monument dedicated to the victims of the Holodomor famine. 2008. Vyshgorod, Kyiv region, Ukraine.
- Monument dedicated to Petro Mohyla. 2005. Kyiv, Ukraine.
- Monument dedicated to Hryhorii Skovoroda. 2005. Kyiv, Ukraine.
- Monument dedicated to Hetman Bohdan Khmelnytsky. 2005. Kyiv, Ukraine.
- Monument dedicated to Taras Shevchenko. 2005. Kyiv, Ukraine.
- Monument dedicated to Lesya Ukrainka. 2005. Kyiv, Ukraine.
- Monument dedicated to Yaroslav the Wise. 2004. Kyiv, Ukraine.
- Monument dedicated to Prince Sviatoslav. 2003. Kyiv, Ukraine.
- Monument dedicated to Hetman Petro-Konashevych Sahaidachny. 2001. Kyiv, Ukraine.
- Monument dedicated to Andrew Pervozvanniy. 2000. Kyiv, Ukraine.

=== Plaques ===
- Plaque dedicated to the memory of the Cranston family. 2014. Haddington, Scotland.
- Plaque dedicated to Soviet Air Force Marshal, Hero of the Soviet Union Alexander Pokryshkin. 2013. Kyiv, Ukraine.
- Plaque dedicated to Ukrainian linguist Volodimir Peretz. 2013. Kyiv, Ukraine.
- Plaque dedicated Ivan Lyashko. 2012. Kyiv, Ukraine.
- Plaque dedicated to Kyiv Arsenal Director Sergei Gusovskiy. 2001. Kyiv, Ukraine.

== Gallery ==
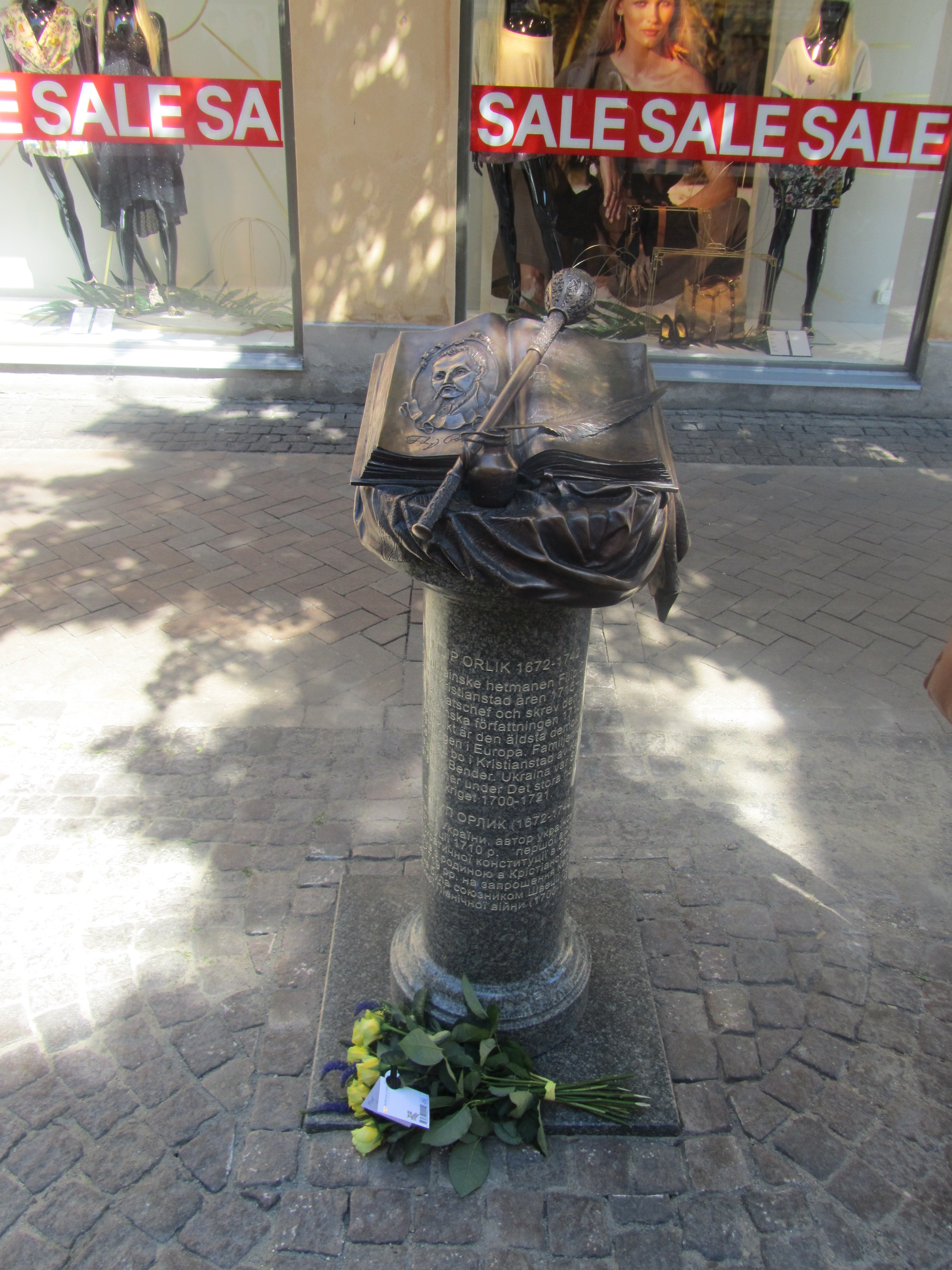
Monument dedicated to Ukrainian hetman Pylyp Orlyk.

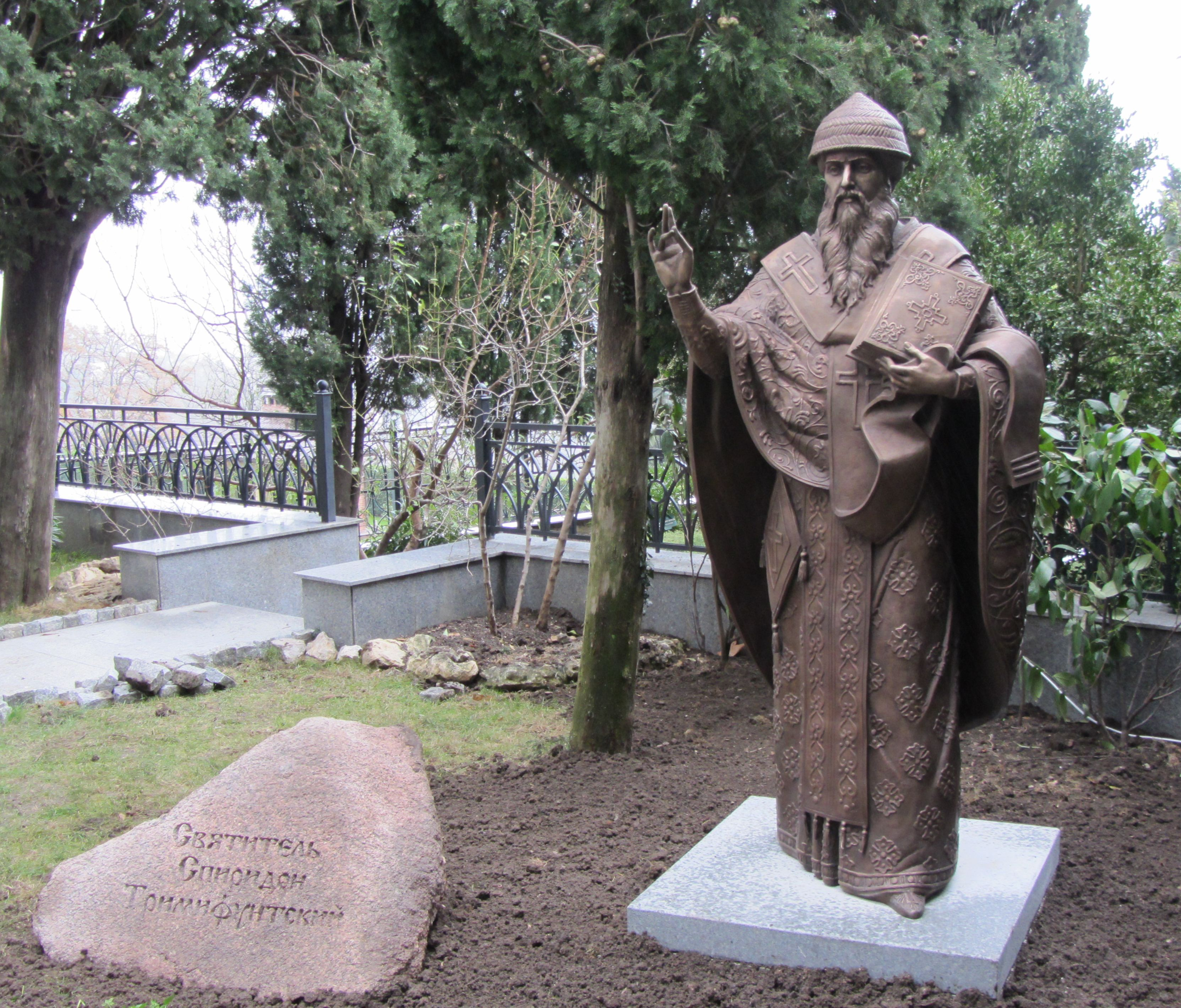
Monument to Spyridon of Trimythus

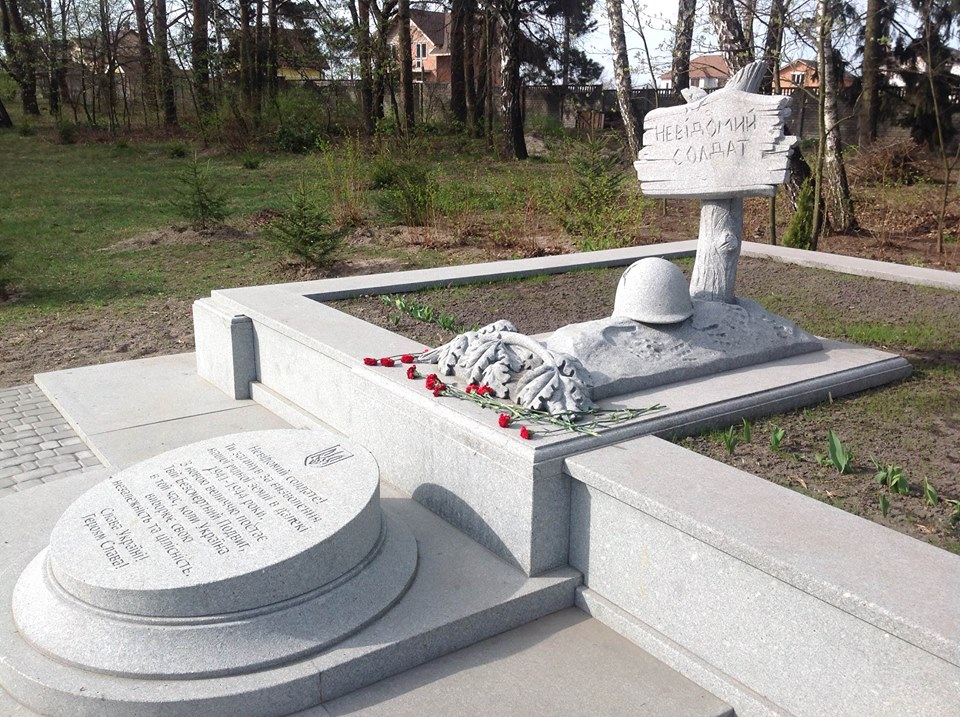
Monument dedicated to the unknown soldier
