= The Children from the Hotel America =

- Directed by: Raimundas Banionis
- Written by: Maciejus Drygas
- Starring: Augustas Šavelis; Gabija Jaraminaitė; Jūratė Onaitytė; Jurga Kaščiukaitė; Gediminas Karka; Linas Paugis; Rolandas Kazlas; Giedrius Čaikauskas
- Music by: Faustas Latėnas
- Release date: December 2, 1990
- Running time: 88 minutes
- Country: Lithuania
- Languages: Lithuanian, Russian

The Children from the Hotel America (Lithuanian: Vaikai iš „Amerikos“ viešbučio) is a 1990 Lithuanian Soviet drama film.

== Synopsis ==
The film revolves around the lives of teenagers in Soviet Lithuania. The protagonists of the film are fans of rock ’n’ roll music, which is banned in the USSR, and are interested in the hippie movement, secretly listening to the Luxembourg radio. They all live in a house which was formerly a hotel, called "America". Events of Kaunas' spring affect them as they are involved. After their attempt to send a letter to the Luxembourg radio, the teenagers would become suspects by the KGB.

== See also ==
- 1972 unrest in Kaunas
- Rock and roll and the fall of communism
