= Kaunas Castle =

Medieval Gothic castle in Kaunas, Lithuania

- Kauno pilis
- Near Kaunas in Lithuania
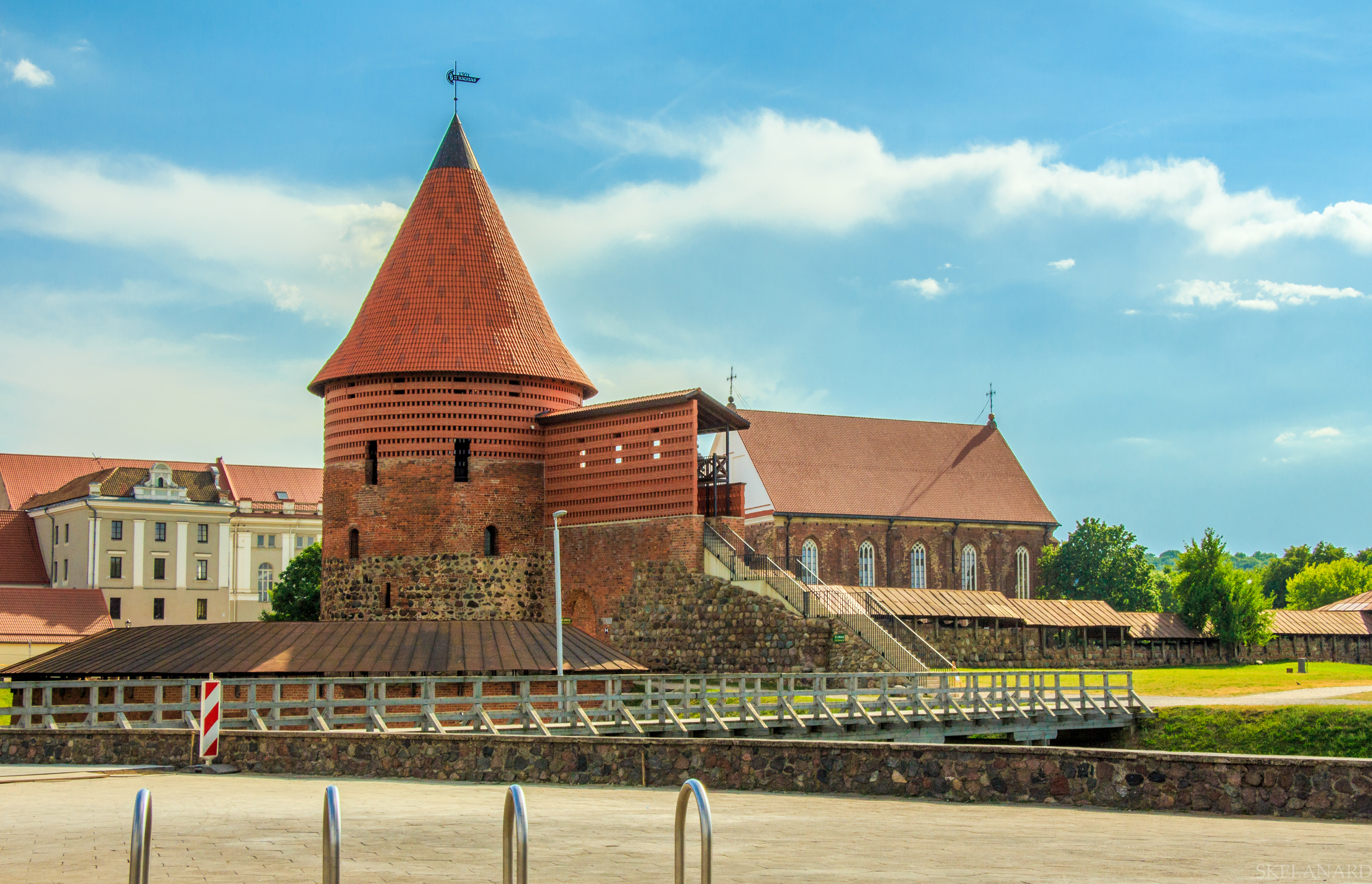
- Kaunas Castle

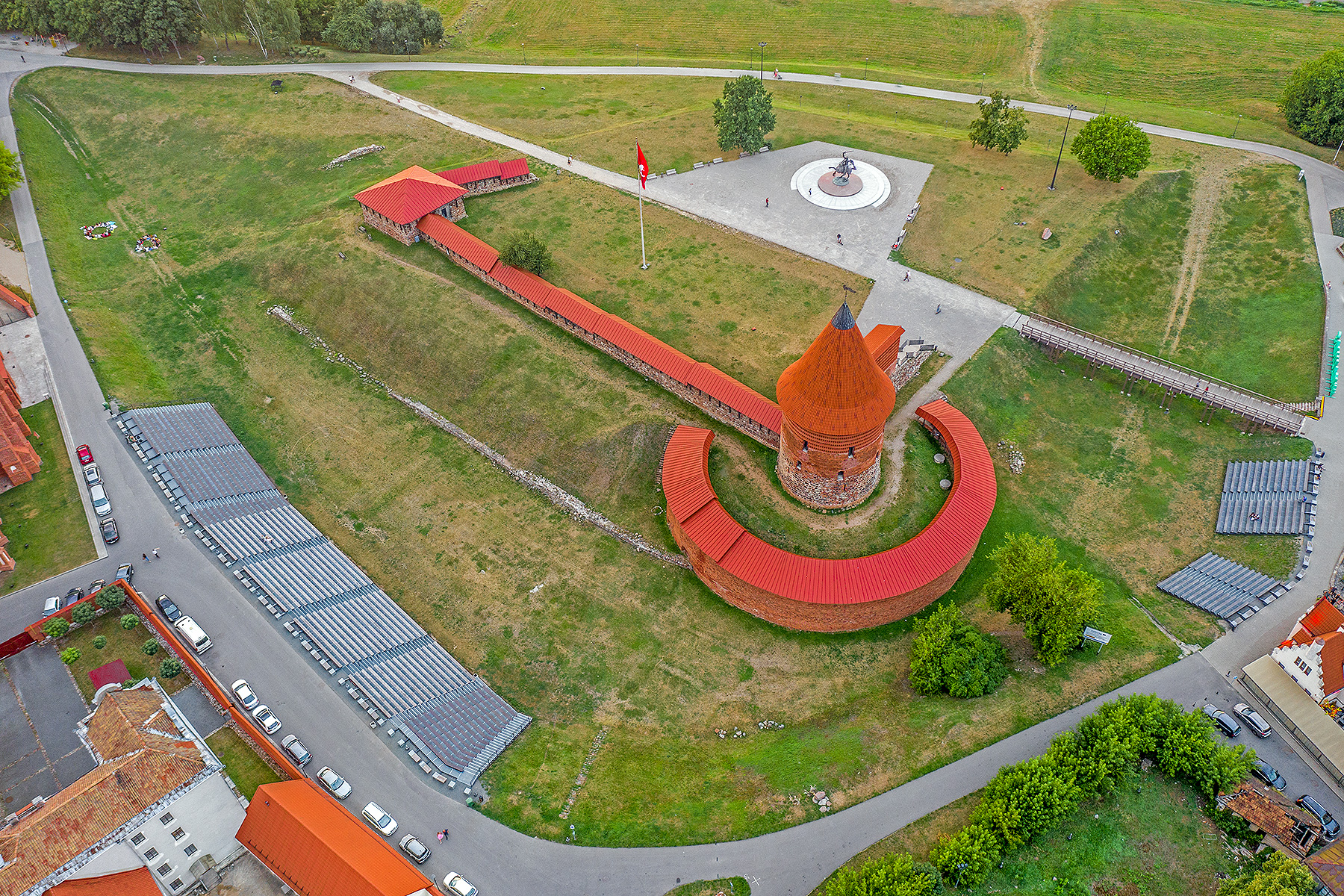
- Aerial view

Site information
- Condition: About one-third still standing

Location
- Coordinates: 54°53′56″N 23°53′06″E

Site history
- Built: Mid-14th century

Kaunas Castle (Lithuanian: Kauno pilis) is a medieval castle in Kaunas, the second-largest city in Lithuania. Archeological evidence suggests that it was built during the mid-14th century in the Gothic style. Its site is strategic—a rise on the banks of the Nemunas River near its confluence with the Neris River. As of the 21st century, roughly one-third of the original castle remains.

== History ==
=== 14th century ===
The precise construction date of the first Kaunas Castle is unknown. Archaeological data suggests that a stone castle was built on the site during the middle of the 14th century. Situated on an elevated bank near the river junction about 100 kilometers (62 mi) from the capital city of Vilnius, it served as a strategic outpost. It guarded nearby cities as well as trade routes. The castle was the property of the Ruler of Lithuania.

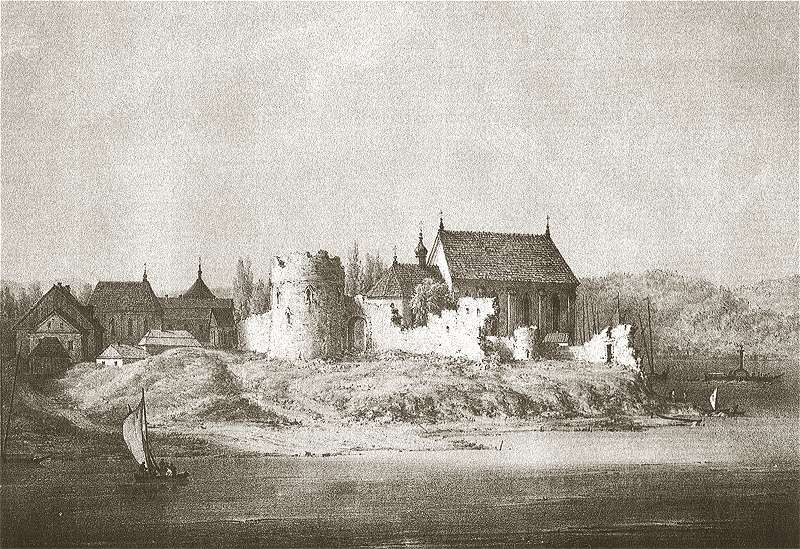
Kaunas Castle in the 19th century

A written account states that in 1361, the Grand Master of the Teutonic Knights Winrich von Kniprode issued an order to gather information about the castle, specifically the thickness of its walls, as preparation for an assault on the castle. In March–April 1362, the castle was besieged by the Teutonic Order. During this attack, the Knights constructed a siege tower and erected wall-penetration machinery; primitive firearms might have been used since gunpowder technology was emerging in Europe. At that time, the castle walls were over 11 meters (36 feet) high when its firing galleries were factored in. According to Wigand of Marburg, the castle's garrison consisted of about 400 Lithuanian soldiers, commanded by Prince Vaidotas, son of Grand Duke Kęstutis. After three weeks, the Knights breached the castle's walls and soon took the castle. On Easter Sunday in 1362, the Knights conducted a Mass at the castle to commemorate their victory.

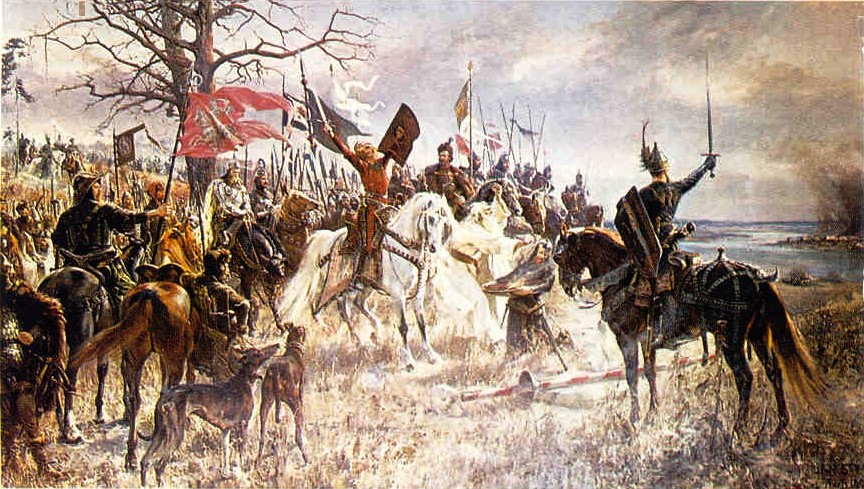
Oath of Vytautas the Great, Grand Duke of Lithuania, by ruined Kaunas Castle in 1362 by Jan Styka in 1901

Apparently, of the castle's defense force of 400, only 36 survived. Questions remain about the castle's defenders' lack of support from outside during the siege. In any event, Kęstutis soon regained and rebuilt Kaunas Castle, but it remained a point of contention between Lithuanians and Teutonic Knights for many years. In 1384, Kaunas Castle was re-captured by the Teutonic Knights. At this time, Grand Master Konrad Zöllner von Rotenstein began the reconstruction of Kaunas Castle and renamed it Marienwerder. The Knights' presence in Kaunas threatened the entire defensive system of castles along the Nemunas. Confronting this situation, the Lithuanians attacked the castle later the same year.

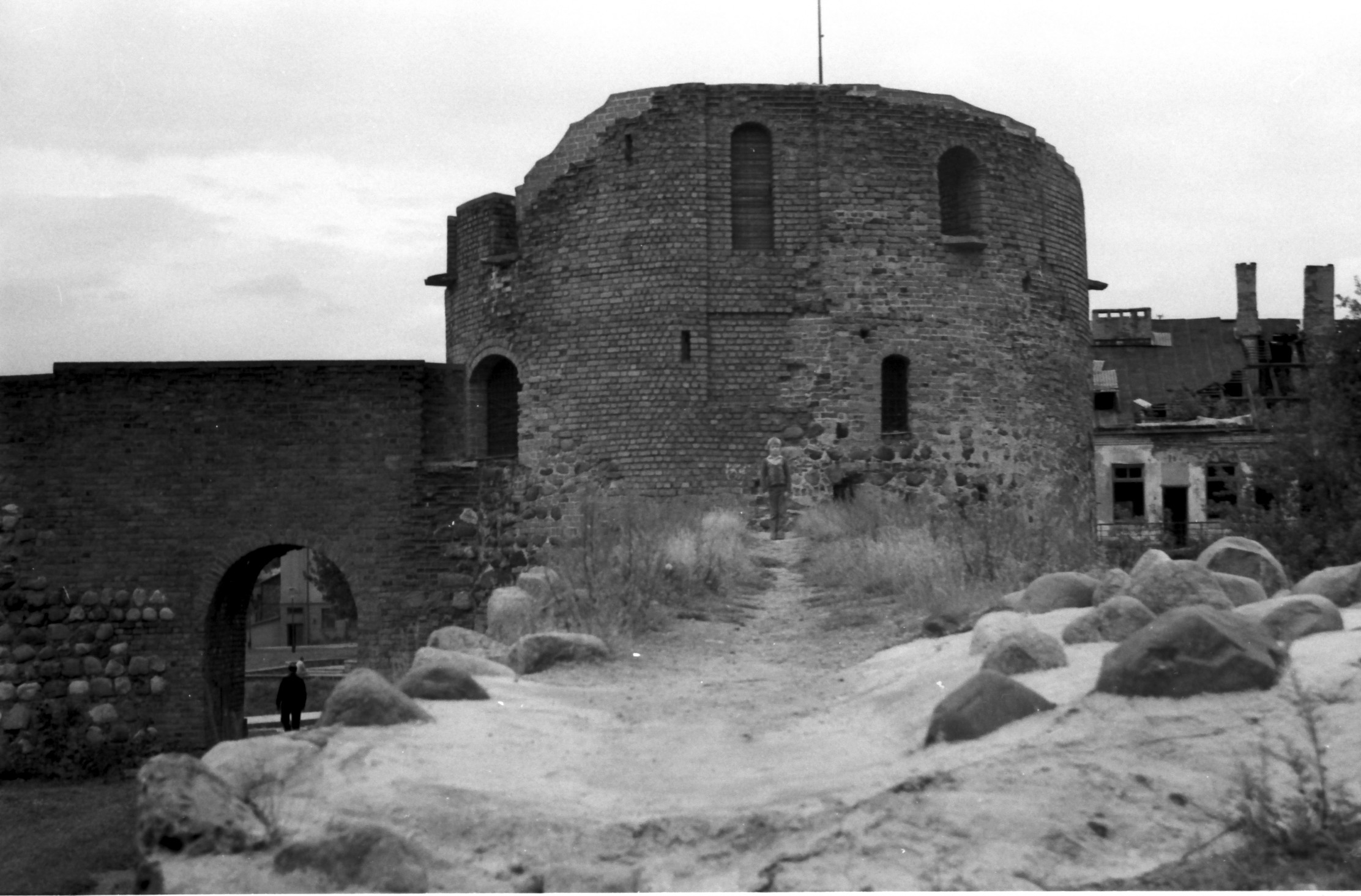
The castle after partial restorations

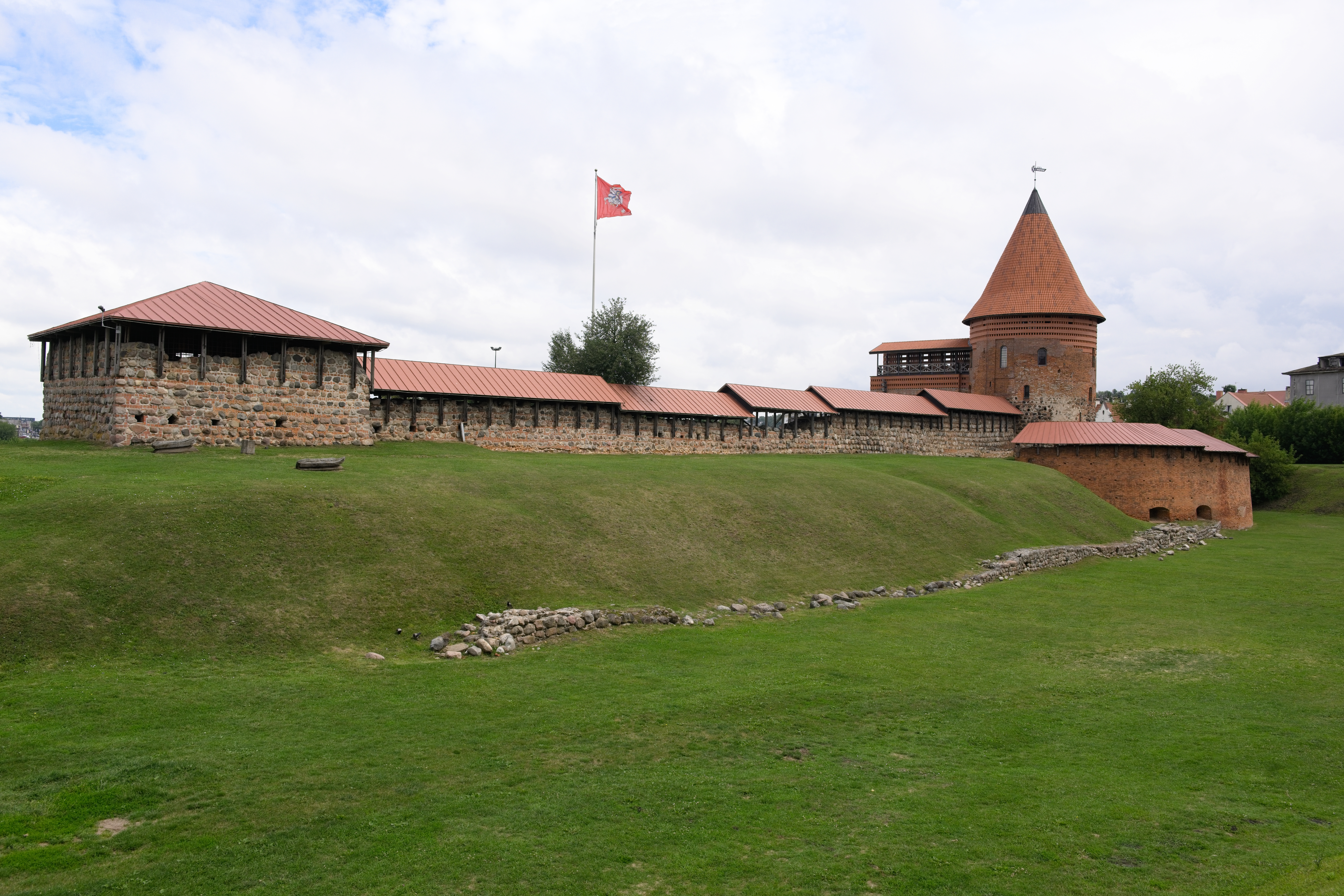
Remnants of the Kaunas Castle medieval fortifications in 2023

The Lithuanians likely mustered an army near Vilnius as a strategic maneuver since Lithuanians could use the downstream flow of the Neris River to transport artillery and military provisions from Vilnius; the Knights likely used overland or upstream transport. During the 1384 assault, the Lithuanians deployed cannons and trebuchets; the besieged Teutonic Knights had also installed cannons in the castle, which destroyed the Lithuanians' trebuchet. Nevertheless, the Lithuanians took the castle.

=== Rebuilt ===
After 1398, the Teutonic Knights could no longer reconquer the castle. Soon after the reconquest Lithuanians began rebuilding and strengthening it. New, thicker walls were construstructed: 3–3.5 meters thick and over 10 meters high. The foundations were widened outwards to allow for this, maintaining the dimensions of the castle's yard. Upon completion of construction the Castle was adapted for withstanding the most up-to-date wall breaking techniques of the time. The castle then had four towers: it is known that the south–eastern tower was rounded, south–western – quadrangle and both of them were four–storey tall. The garrison size of 600 soldiers was recorded in 1409.

Following the Battle of Grunwald, Kaunas Castle began to be used mainly as a residence and an administrative centre of state affairs. At least one, possibly more, of the four castle's towers was converted for the residential purposes. Vytautas the Great stayed here frequently, Władysław II Jagiełło often organized gatherings in the castle. The Elder of Kaunas (seniūnas), title created in 1398, was tasked to preside over the castle and allowed to reside here. In confluence with the city being granted the Magdeburg rights in 1408, castle became the core centre of the Kaunas Powiat administration.

The castle's stature in serving the Grand Duchy's administrative purposes diminished after the death of Vytautas the Great. One of the Castle's purposes then became being a prison for nobles and captives of war. Sheikh Ahmed, the last Khan, was jailed here. Sigismund Augustus gave this castle to his wife Barbara Radziwill in 1549. During the 16th century, the castle was strengthened and adapted to new defensive purposes by constructing an artillery bastion near the round tower. The diameter of the bastion was about 40 meters (130 feet) and the height of the bastion's walls was about 12 meters (39 feet); the wall worked in conjunction with a defensive trench. A firing gallery linked with the tower was installed at the bottom of the bastion.

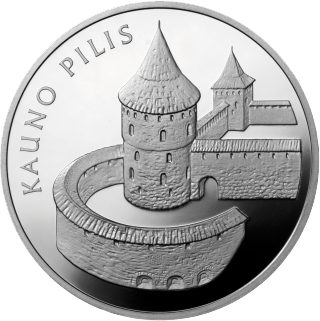
A coin with a presumable view of the remaining part of the castle

In 1601, Kaunas Castle housed courts and an archive. At some time in 1611, the Neris River flooded part of the castle. Due to its convenient location, it was used by the Swedish military during its war with the Polish–Lithuanian Commonwealth, after which its military functions ceased. In the mid-17th century, large portions of the castle were again flooded. The castle was used as a prison in the 18th century; later, the Russian administration granted permission for houses to be built on the castle's territory, which resulted in significant damage to the castle.

=== Restoration ===
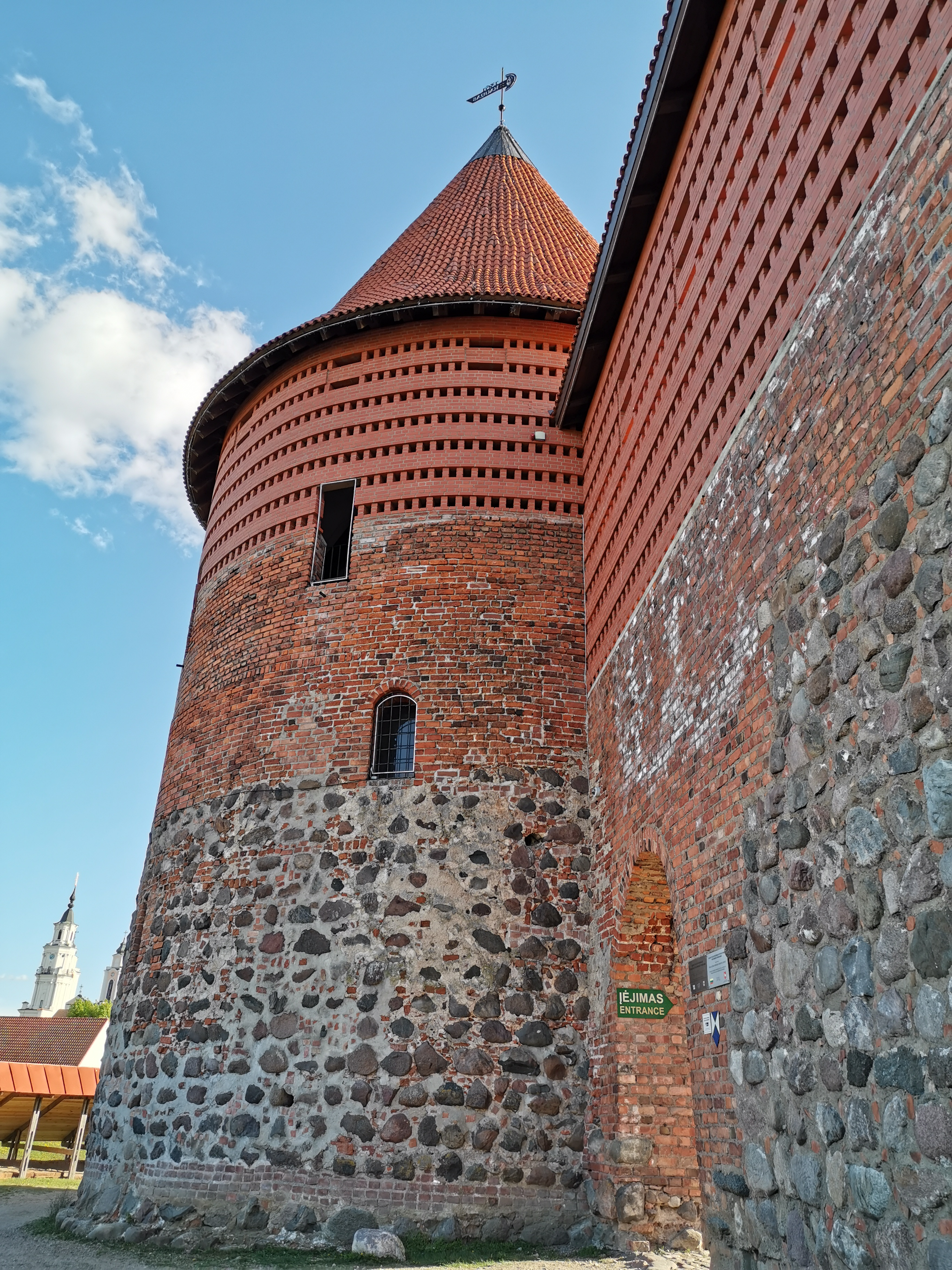
Tower in 2019

For many years afterward, Kaunas castle stood abandoned. Protection of the castle began in 1930; the residential houses within the yard of the Castle were demolished, and archeologists examined the territory. Further efforts to preserve the castle began in 1954. The round tower was repaired; the firing bastion was later excavated from beneath several overlying strata. The excavated bastion was in excellent condition. As part of its protection, temporary roofing was placed there and on the remaining towers and walls. The remaining portions of the round tower were not reconstructed to their original height, nor were the castle walls; the bigger parts are only the remaining foundations of the walls.

Periodic archeological excavations continued at Kaunas Castle. The evidence gathered from these archeological works suggests that the castle's configuration, excluding the bastion, has remained in the form it took during its reconstruction in 1376.

In the 1960s, the round tower was opened as a museum, but due to its structural deterioration, the museum was transferred to a different location.

== Current state ==
Major reconstruction work started in 2010 and ended in 2011. In 2011, a branch of the Kaunas City Museum was established in Kaunas Castle. The castle is open to tourism and hosts occasional festivals.

In July 2018, the Freedom Warrior sculpture inspired by Lithuanian national symbol Vytis was erected near the castle.

In 2019, Kaunas City museum with Kaunas Castle became a new Member of Association of Castles and Museums around the Baltic Sea.

== In popular culture ==
Kaunas' city and castle were mentioned in the famous Lithuanian and Polish poet Adam Mickiewicz poem Konrad Wallenrod (1828), set in the 14th-century Grand Duchy of Lithuania.

== See also ==
- List of castles in Lithuania
- Gothic architecture in Lithuania
- Kaunas Fortress
