= Romas Kalanta =

Lithuanian Soviet dissident

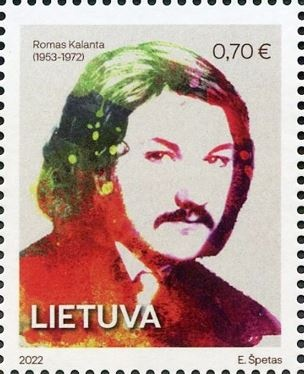
- Kalanta on a 2022 stamp of Lithuania
- Born: 22 February 1953; Alytus, Lithuanian SSR
- Died: 14 May 1972 (aged 19); Kaunas, Lithuanian SSR
- Cause of death: Self-immolation
- Monuments: Memorial in Kaunas
- Occupation: Factory worker
- Era: Second Soviet occupation of Lithuania
- Known for: 1972 self-immolation
- Movement: Anti-communism
- Awards: Order of the Cross of Vytis

Romas Kalanta (22 February 1953 – 14 May 1972) was a 19-year-old Lithuanian high school student who killed himself by self-immolation in an act of protest against the Soviet regime in Lithuania. His death provoked the largest post-war riots in Lithuania and inspired similar self-immolations. In 1972, 13 more people committed suicide by self-immolation in Lithuania.

Kalanta became a symbol of the Lithuanian resistance throughout the 1970s and 1980s. In 2000, he was posthumously awarded the Order of the Cross of Vytis.

== Life and death ==
Kalanta was religious; in a school essay he indicated that he would like to become a Roman Catholic priest, which caused him some troubles with the authorities. He attended an evening school while working at a factory. Kalanta played the guitar and made a few drawings; he had long hair and sympathised with the hippies. These sympathies were later exploited by the Soviets to discredit Kalanta among the older population.

At noon on 14 May 1972, Kalanta poured three litres of petroleum on himself and set himself on fire in the square adjoining the Laisvės Alėja in front of the Kaunas State Musical Theatre where, in 1940, the puppet legislature People's Seimas had declared the establishment of the Lithuanian Soviet Socialist Republic and petitioned the Soviet Union to admit Lithuania as one of the soviet socialist republics. He died about 14 hours later in hospital. Before the suicide, Kalanta left his notebook with a brief note on a bench. Its content became known only after the declaration of independence in 1990 and opening up of secret KGB archives. The note read "blame only the regime for my death" (Lithuanian: Dėl mano mirties kaltinkite tik santvarką). No other notes were found to explain in more detail what had provoked the suicide.

After his death, rumours spread that a few of his classmates had formed a patriot group, and that they had held a lottery to determine which of them would have to carry out the mission. Official Soviet propaganda claimed that Kalanta was mentally ill.

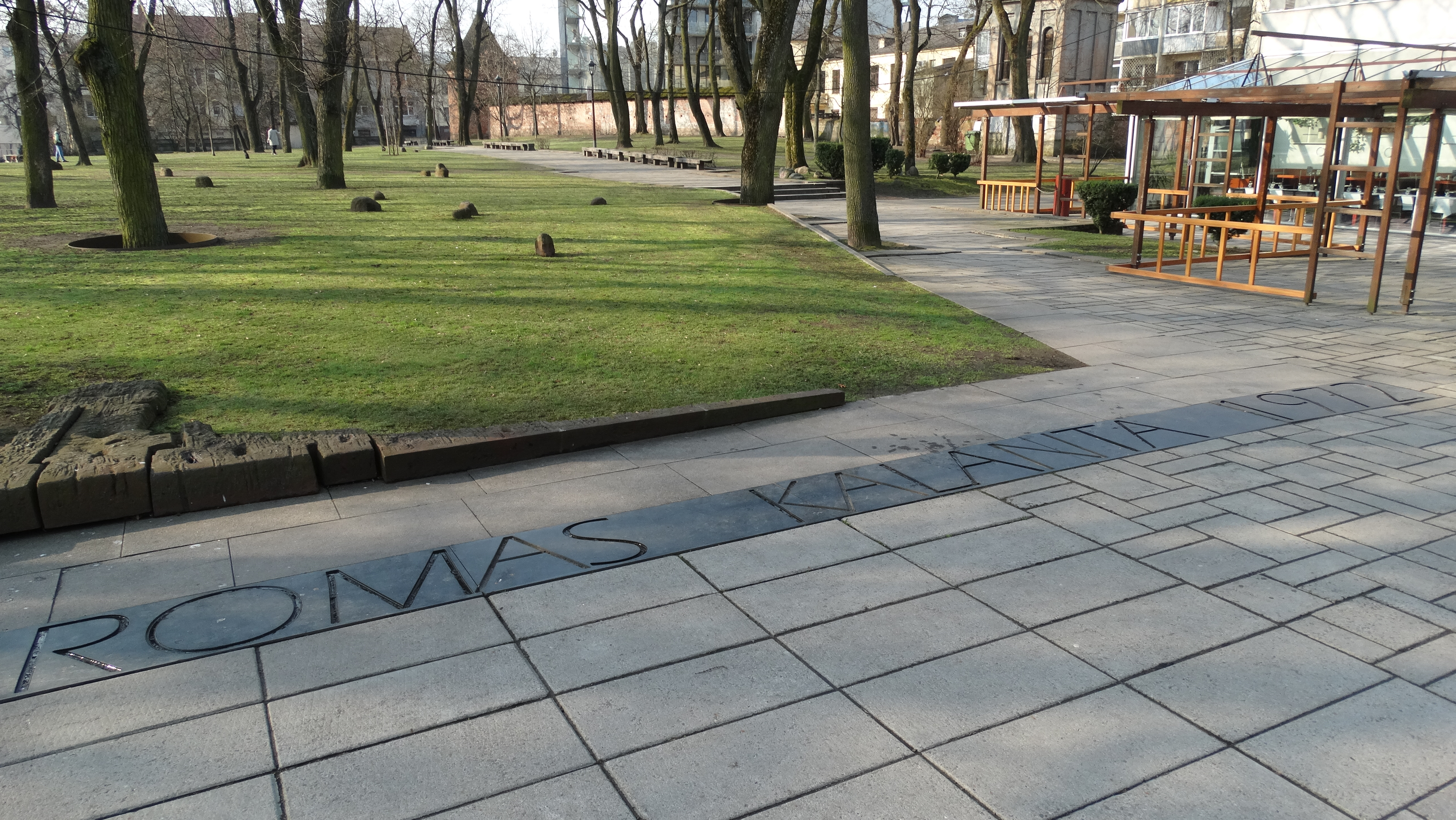
The memorial to Romas Kalanta in Kaunas in the place of his self-immolation. The inscription reads Romas Kalanta 1972

== Riots and aftermath ==
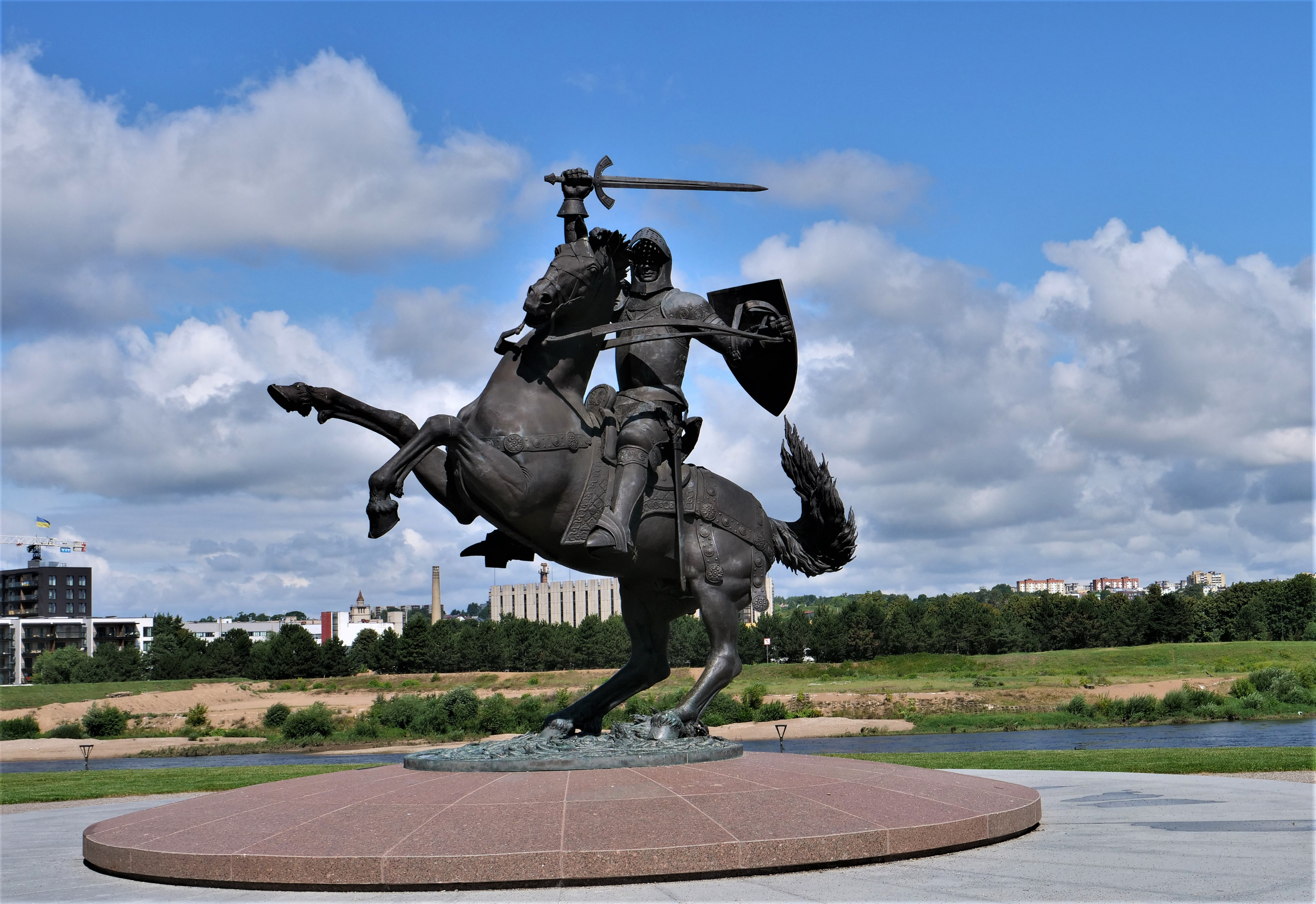
Freedom Warrior statue in Kaunas, whose face was modeled after Kalanta's

The Soviet government tried to cover up the event, but its witnesses spread the news by word of mouth. On 18 May, the Soviet authorities hastened Kalanta's burial by several hours to prevent publicity. His funeral procession touched off two full days of rebellion in which thousands of people took to the streets shouting: "Freedom for Lithuania!" They attacked a police station and the party offices. The people gathered, mostly high school students and young workers, broke into a politically charged riot, which was forcibly dispersed by the KGB, militsiya, and Internal Troops. The next day, about 3,000 people marched along the Laisvės Alėja of whom 402 were arrested. The New York Times reported numerous injuries and one death among Soviet troops.

The public agitation was felt throughout 1972 and 1973 as the KGB registered various anti-Soviet incidents to even greater degrees. Lithuania recorded 13 other suicides by fire in 1972, including 24-year-old V. Stonys in Varėna on 29 May, 60-year-old A. Andriuškevičius in Kaunas on 3 June, 62-year-old Zališauskas on 10 June, and 40-year-old Juozapas Baracevičius in Šiauliai on 22 June.
