= Freedom Warrior (Kaunas) =

Public sculpture in Kaunas, Lithuania

Coordinates: 54.8994467°N 23.88488°E

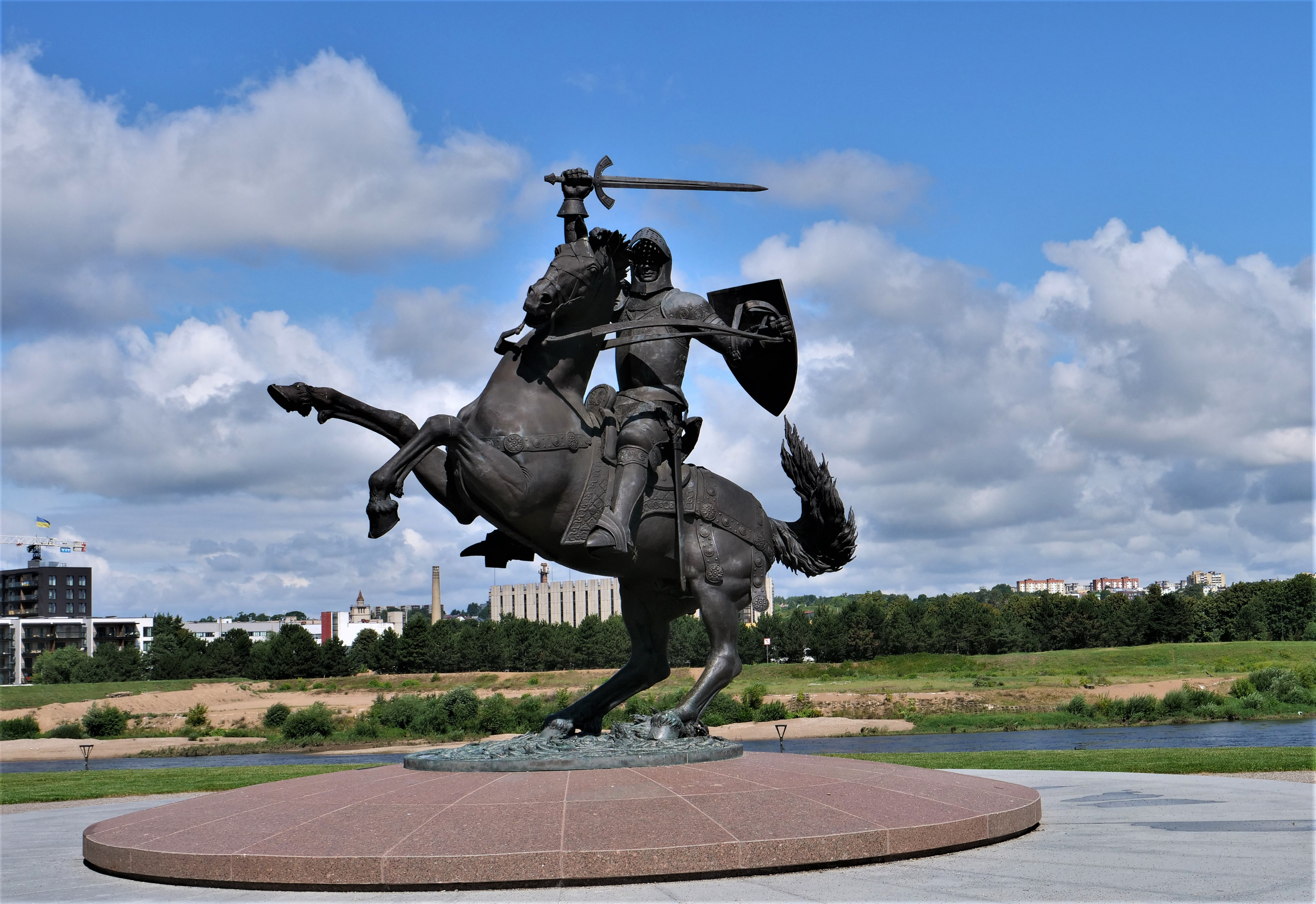
Freedom Warrior statue

The Freedom Warrior is a public sculpture in Kaunas, Lithuania. It is inspired by Vytis, a national symbol of Lithuania.

== Overview ==
The project to erect a statue of Vytis started in 2015 and was promoted by a civil society initiative, the Vytis Support Foundation, which commissioned sculptor Arūnas Sakalauskas. The project was initially intended for Lukiškės Square in Vilnius but received no consensus there, leading to the selection of Kaunas as a preferred location. In late 2017, the municipality of Kaunas committed to the project by signing an agreement with the foundation and the sculptor, while a Ukrainian foundry was selected. Three locations were considered, respectively on the grounds of Kaunas Castle, Nemunas island, and Confluence Park.

The Kaunas Castle site was subsequently selected, and the sculpture was produced by Ukrainian master founders Borys Krylov and Oles Sydoruk. The finished sculpture was shipped in three parts from Kyiv in late June 2018. It was inaugurated on 6 July 2018, the Statehood Day date on the hundred-year anniversary of Lithuanian independence. On that occasion, Sakalauskas revealed that he had modeled the warrior's face after Romas Kalanta, a symbol of the Lithuanian resistance against the Soviet regime. The ceremony was attended, among others, by former Lithuanian President Valdas Adamkus, Kaunas Archbishop Lionginas Virbalas, Speaker of the Seimas Viktoras Pranckietis, and Kaunas Mayor Visvaldas Matijošaitis.

== See also ==
- Freedom Monument (Kaunas)
- Statue of Vytautas the Great
- Coat of arms of Lithuania
