= Wooden Staircase =

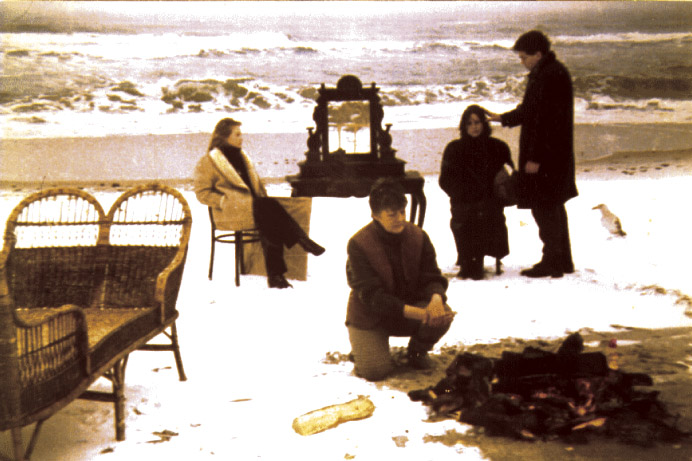
- Final Scene of the film
- Directed by: Vidas Rasinskas
- Written by: Vidas Rasinskas; Alvydas Bausys
- Produced by: Arunas Stoskus; Vidas Rasinskas; Sigitas Puckorius
- Starring: Evaldas Jaras; Gabrielle Odinis; Virginija Kelmelyte; Dalia Melenaite; Vaclovas Bledis
- Cinematography: Jonas Tamasevicius
- Edited by: Vanda Surviliene; Liudmila Volkova
- Music by: Gustav Mahler; Faustas Latėnas
- Release date: October 13, 1993
- Running time: 93 min. version 56 min. version
- Country: Lithuania
- Language: Lithuanian

Wooden Staircase (Lithuanian: Mediniai laiptai, Russian: Derevyannye stupeni) is a feature film of Lithuanian screenwriter and film director Vidas Rasinskas.

== Plot summary ==
Wooden Staircase is a poetic drama of Time and Fate, a metaphor, leading to introspection. Two young people, connected through Time and Fate, are looking for consensus and comprehension between themselves. There is a mystic protagonist, Thomas. He embodies the famous writer Thomas Mann’s spirit, living beyond the time. Thomas lets the young protagonist, Vilius, go back to his past and compels him to face the results of his former mistakes. A rendezvous with the past has a large influence on Vilius present.

== Recognition ==
The premiere of Wooden Staircase, (93 min. version) was at the International Film Festival Cottbus, Germany in 1993.
The film Wooden Staircase, (56 min. version) won the competition in Moscow and was selected as the best student work of the year. It was presented for the 22nd Student Academy Award in 1995.
