= Statue of Vytautas the Great =

Public sculpture in Kaunas, Lithuania

Coordinates: 54°53′53″N 23°54′22″E

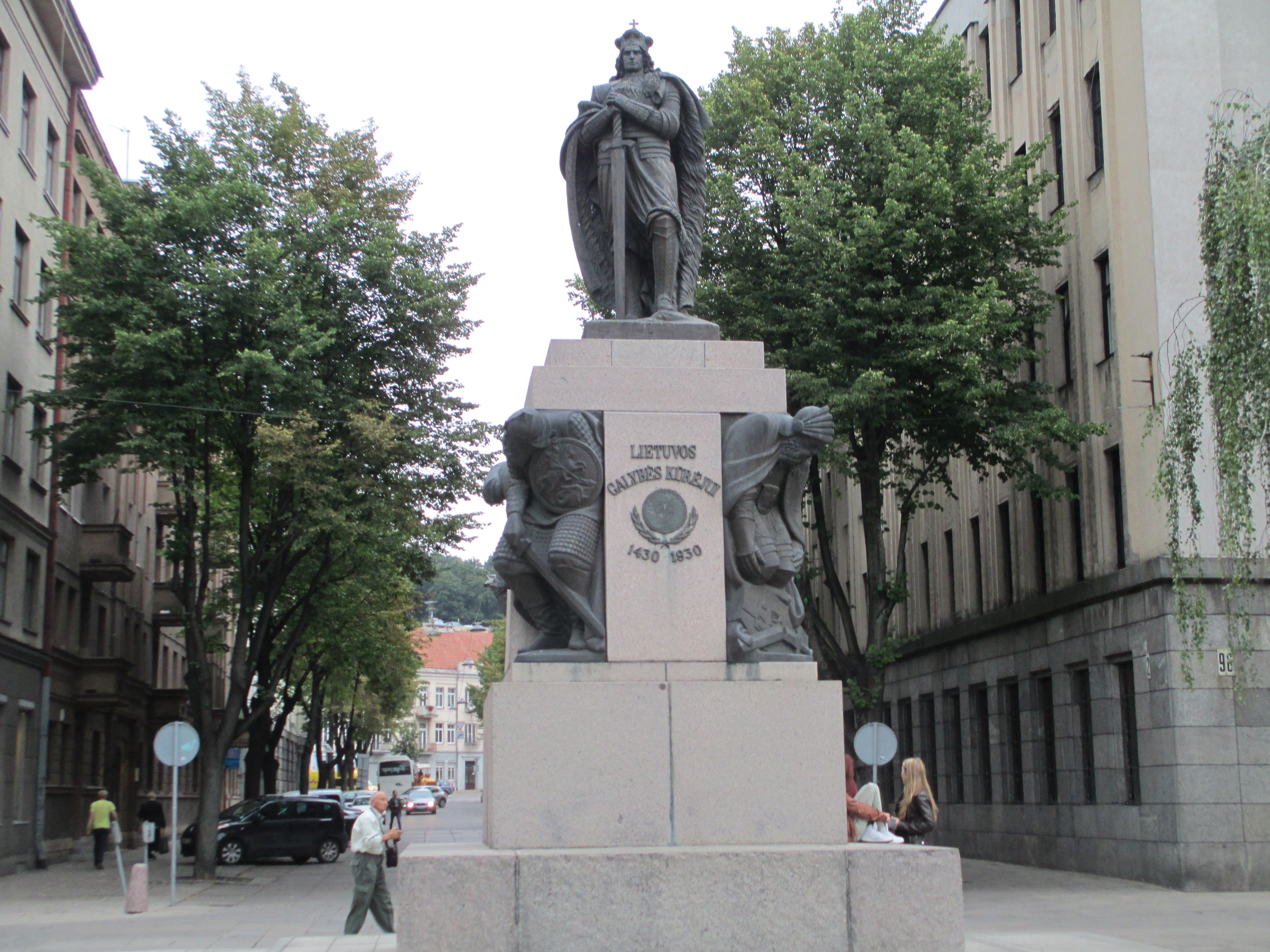
The statue in Kaunas, with figures on the pedestal representing defeated Russia (left) and Poland (right)

The statue of Vytautas the Great is a public sculpture in Kaunas, Lithuania, erected in 1932, destroyed in 1952, and restored to its original appearance (albeit on a different location) in 1990. It features prominent national figure Grand Duke Vytautas the Great dominating four vanquished warriors representing Poland, the Golden Horde, the Teutonic Order (symbolically also representing Germany), and Muscovy (also representing Russia and the Soviet Union).

The reconstructed pedestal features a bronze map of the Grand Duchy of Lithuania at the time of Vytautas the Great, the only surviving piece of the original monument. That map displays its territory extending all the way to the Black Sea and indicating within it the cities of Bratslav, Kyiv, Kursk, Lutsk, Mogilev, and Smolensk, which are now part of Belarus, Russia and Ukraine. It is framed by the inscription "Lietuvos galybės kūrėjui", literally a dedication "to the creator of Lithuanian power", and the dates 1430 and 1930 referring to the 500th anniversary of Vytautas the Great's death.

== Original monument ==
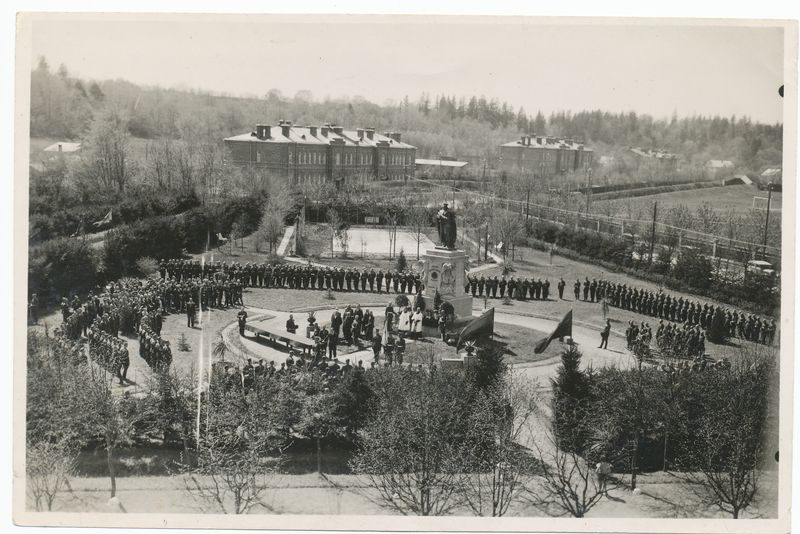
Postcard of a graduation ceremony in the 1930s, showing the statue in the War School of Kaunas

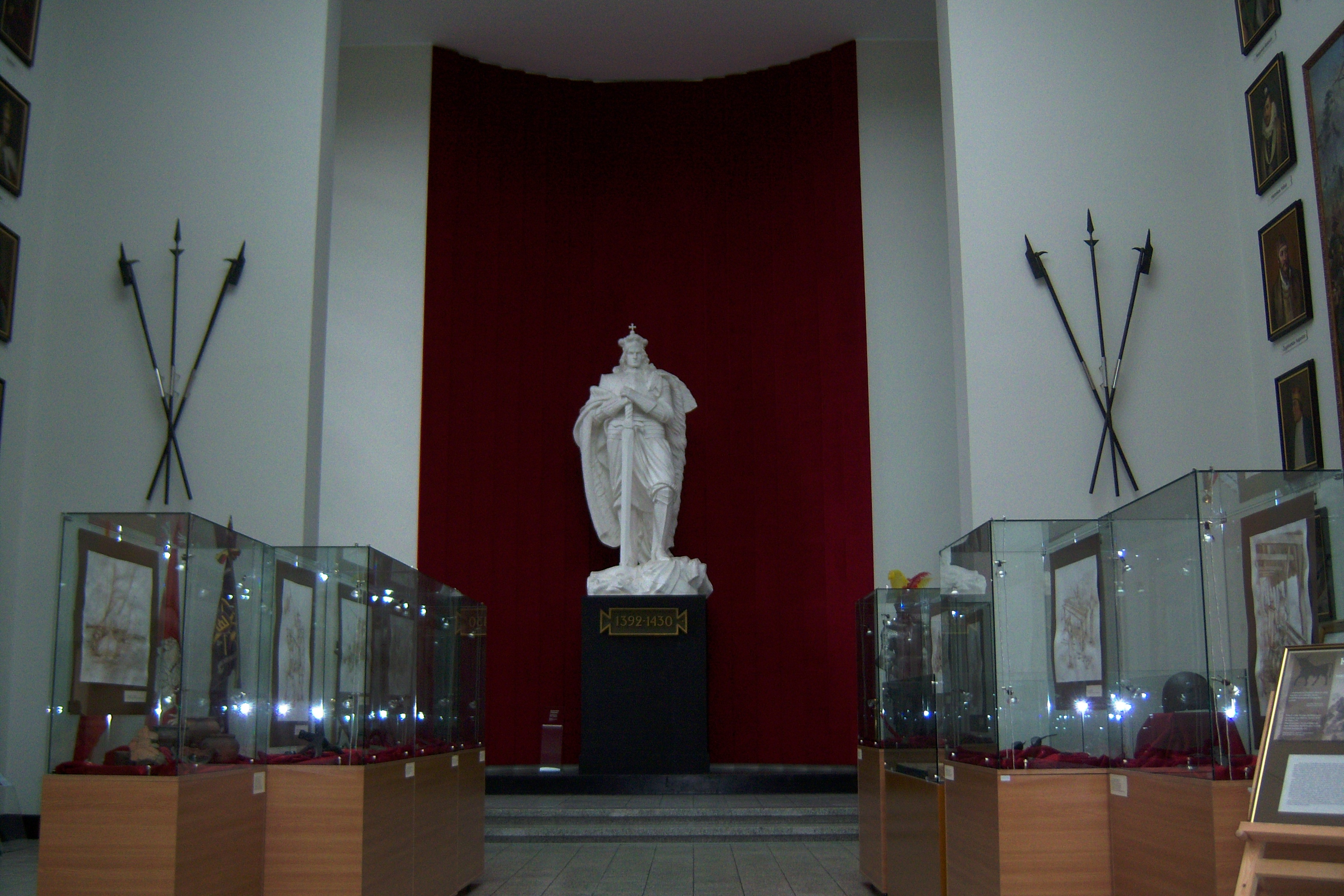
Plaster at Vytautas the Great War Museum

The project to erect the statue originated in the War School of Kaunas, located in the city's southeastern Panemunė suburb. It was led by Stasys Dirmantas, a major figure of military education in interwar Lithuania, who chaired a committee that raised funds and commissioned sculptor Vincas Grybas. The latter had started specializing in public sculpture following his return from Paris where he had attended the workshop of Antoine Bourdelle, and in 1930 had produced a monumental bust of Vytautas the Great which still stands in Jurbarkas.

The statue, placed in the War School's courtyard, was inaugurated on 7 September 1932. Its iconography was shaped by the context of the newly independent country following the Lithuanian Wars of Independence and its defensive nationalism, not least vis-à-vis neighboring Poland, Germany (from which Lithuania had seized the Klaipėda Region in 1923), and the Soviet Union. Relations with Poland were particularly tense following the Polish–Lithuanian War and Poland's 1920 annexation of Vilnius, which Lithuanians viewed as their historic capital. The representation of the Polish knight as a defeated adversary with a broken sword reflected that antagonism, and its presence in the monument to Vytautas the Great was in line with local interwar narratives that represented the Lithuanian Civil War of 1389–1392 as a fight for independence from Poland. Even so, the simultaneous representation of the four defeated enemies sat awkwardly with the historical facts: Vytautas the Great had allied with the Teutonic Knights and Muscovy during the civil war, in which his cousin and feudal overlord Jogaila, Poland's first king of the namesake Jagiellonian dynasty, largely prevailed; he then allied with Poland by the Ostrów Agreement in 1392, renewed by the Pact of Vilnius and Radom (1401) and the Union of Horodło (1413), and fought alongside it against the Teutonic Knights including at his most celebrated victory at the battle of Grunwald in 1410; and his main confrontation with the Golden Horde ended in strategic defeat at the battle of the Vorskla River in 1399.

In 1934, the Lithuanian 2nd Infantry Regiment purchased the original plaster of the standing figure of Vytautas the Great from Grybas and donated it to the Vytautas the Great War Museum in Kaunas.

The monument survived the turmoil of World War II, but was destroyed by the Soviet authorities in 1952.

== Reconstruction ==
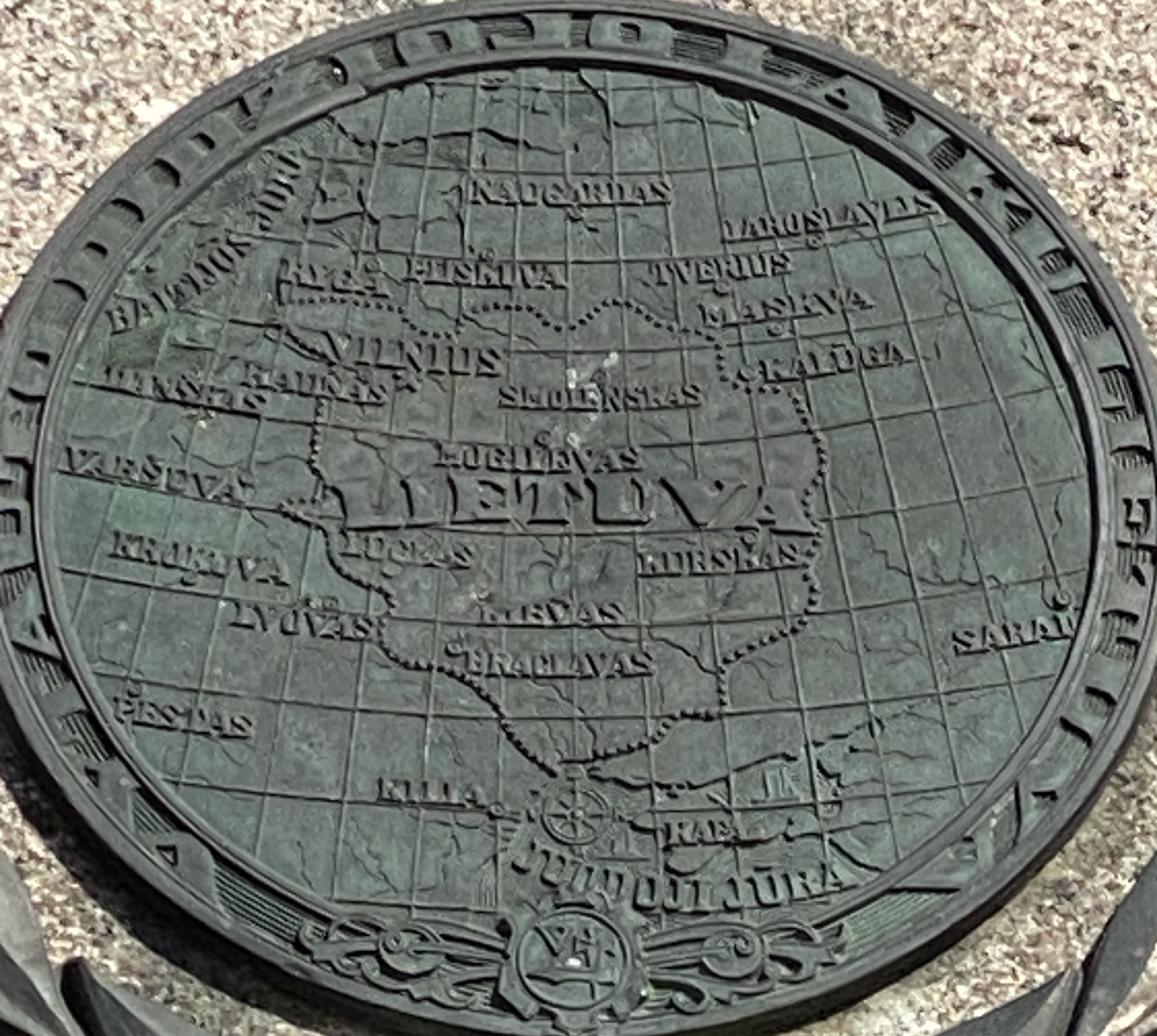
Bronze map of the former Grand Duchy of Lithuania on the statue's pedestal

The idea to re-erect the statue arose during a conference held on 5 May 1988 by the Aukuras Club chaired by Gediminas Kostkevičius, an organization associated with the revival of Lithuanian national awareness at the time. Because the statue's original site was still under the control of the Soviet Army and thus unavailable, the club organized two successive rounds of voting about an alternative location. Architect Jurgis Bučas's suggestion of the site on Laisvės alėja near the Kaunas District Municipality building was retained in June 1989, and the municipal administration gave the relevant permit on 12 February 1990.

The recreated version was inaugurated on 15 July 1990, marking the 560th anniversary of Vytautas the Great's death and the 580th anniversary of the Battle of Grunwald. The ceremony was attended by Lithuanian Army Colonel Antanas Malijonis and Ričardas Mikutavičius, parish priest of the church of Vytautas the Great in Kaunas, who consecrated the statue. The Grunwald connection was emphasized by the placement in the monument of a stone brought from the battle's site and a capsule containing soil from there. A plaque commemorating the role of the Aukuras Club in the monument's reconstruction was added on the pedestal on the eve of the inauguration ceremony; it was removed a few years later.

The nationalistic ideals enshrined in the monument were undisputed at the time of its re-creation, but became more controversial later on. In particular, the depiction of Poland as an enemy nation defeated by Vytautas the Great, at odds with both the 1990 narrative emphasizing the Battle of Grunwald and the subsequent positive development of Lithuanian-Polish relations, led in the 2010s to calls for the monument to be removed from its public setting and placed in a museum. Nevertheless, the statue has become an iconic landmark of Kaunas.

== See also ==
- Freedom Warrior (Kaunas)
- Freedom Monument (Kaunas)
- King Jagiello Monument in New York
