= Kaunas State Musical Theatre =

Coordinates: 54°53′46″N 23°54′21″E

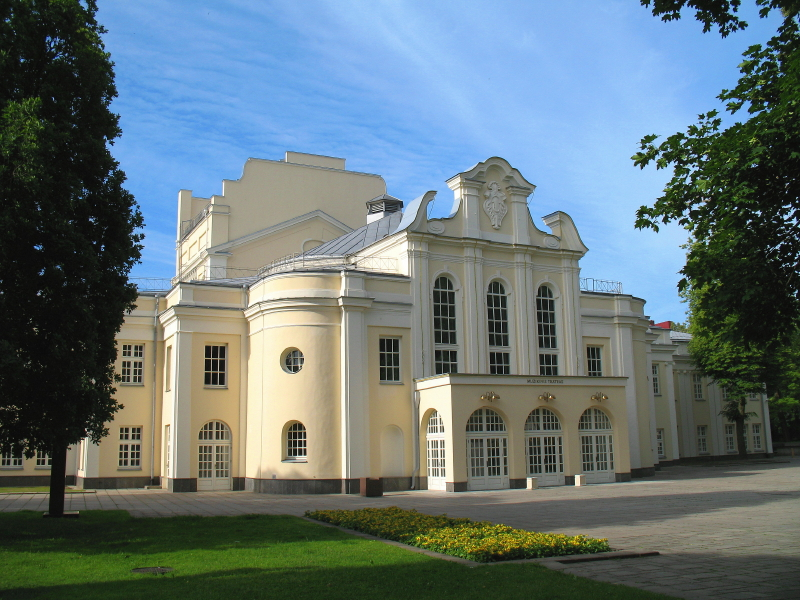
Kaunas State Musical Theatre in 2006

The Kaunas State Musical Theatre, formerly Kaunas City Theatre, is a theatre in Kaunas, Lithuania. It is home to a musical theatre company of the same name, established on 27 November 1940 in the former State Theatre hall on the Laisvės Alėja.

== History ==
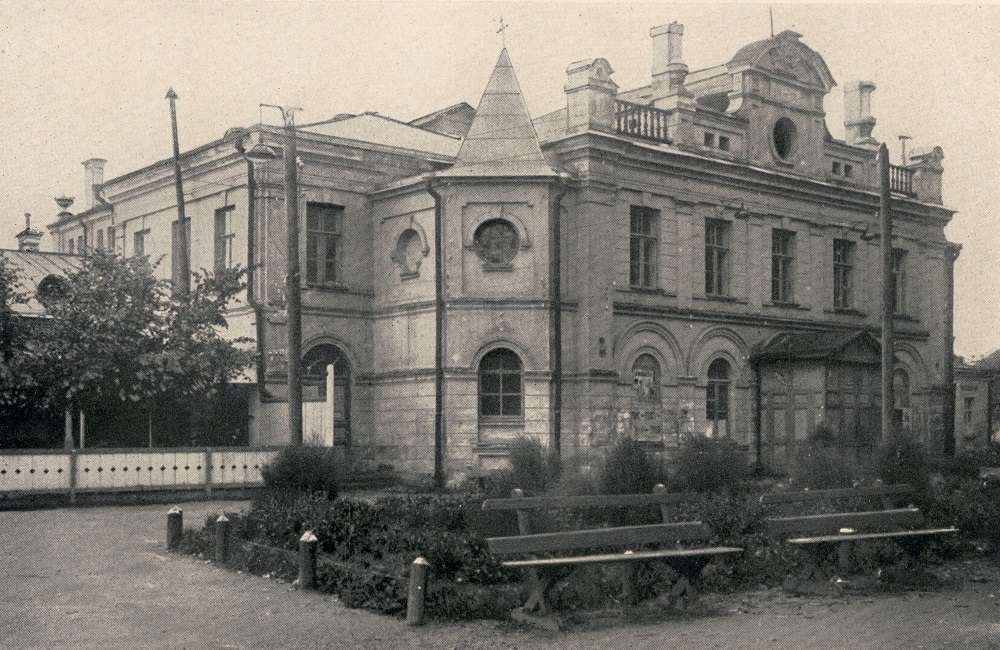
The Kaunas City Theatre, where the first session of the Constituent Assembly of Lithuania took place (pictured before the First World War)

The building dates back to 1892, when a small Russian municipal theatre designed by Kaunas province architect Ustin Golinevich was built next to what is now known as the City Garden. The decision to build a Kaunas City Theatre was made in 1891, and the first play was staged there on January 9, 1892. Renaissance Revival architecture was chosen as a style for the building, and it was built in the City Garden square. The two-story building incorporated a hall of 500 m^{2} (5,400 sq ft) in size. Spectators also could watch plays from the two-storey balcony rows. In the balconies, special loges were established for the Governor of Kaunas and the commandant of Kaunas Fortress.

Kaunas became the temporary capital during the period of the First Republic after World War I, and the building became one of the main stages of the State. It was also used for meetings of the City Council, and later the Seimas (parliament).

In 1919, first performances of Antanas Sutkus' National Theater were staged in the theatre, and in 1920, the Lithuanian Artists' Association established their drama and opera theatres here. In 1922, the association was nationalised, and the State Theatre was established.

However the 450-seat theatre, with two-storey uncomfortable balconies, was considered too small to accommodate the country's main performing arts centre, but the economy did not allow for a complete reconstruction. Instead, a significant renovation was designed by architects Vladimir Dubenecki and Mykolas Songaila. The style of the main façade added neo-baroque forms to its previous neoclassical style. The reconstruction, completed in 1925, expanded and modernised the stage and the hall, with the hall featuring Art Deco interior decoration. More entrances and staircases were also added. The seating was increased to accommodated 763 people, with a third row of balconies and a central loge added.

In 1930-1933, a second complete renovation of the building was instigated, designed by Vytautas Landsbergis-Žemkalnis. The premises were significantly expanded, and a motor-operated fire curtain was installed in front of the stage, which was brought into use when a fire broke out in the same year.

On 21 July 1940, after Lithuania was annexed by the Soviet Union, the "People's Seimas" announced the founding of Lithuania as a Socialist Soviet Republic in the theatre building, and later that year the State Theatre was abolished. There were many changes of name, and theatre troupes merged, were established or disestablished. After the Nazi occupation of Lithuania during World War II, many opera and ballet troupes left Kaunas.

In 1948, the company of the Lithuanian Opera and Ballet Theatre, which had resided in the State Musical Theatre, was moved to Vilnius, and musical theatre became the only dramatic genre cultivated in the building. It built its reputation on staging musical comedies. After Lithuania regained independence, the theatre added opera to its repertoire.

in 1959, the drama and musical theatre companies separated, and the Kaunas State Drama Theatre moved to its present location at Laisvės alėja 71, in the refurbished former "Metropolitan" (also spelt "Metropolitain") cinema

In 1980–1984, a major renovation was completed by the Institute for the Restoration of Monuments, and in 2008, yet another major reconstruction and modernisation was again carried out.

Romas Kalanta set himself on fire in 1972 as a protest against the Soviet regime in the nearby square.

== Notable performances ==
- Giuseppe Verdi's opera Rigoletto, 1951

== See also ==
- Lithuanian Academy of Music and Theatre, in Vilnius
