= Vincas Grybas =

Lithuanian sculptor

Vincas Grybas (3 October 1890 – 3 July 1941) was a Lithuanian sculptor. Vincas Grybas was born in Lukšiai village, where he finished elementary school. Later, he continued his studies at Warsaw art school. After World War I, Grybas extended his studies in Kaunas and Paris. In 1919, he joined the LSDP (Social Democratic Party of Lithuania). After Lithuania was occupied by the Nazi Germany, Grybas was handed over to the Gestapo by the local auxiliary forces and shot on July 3rd, 1941, along with 300 Jews from Jurbarkas.

== Works ==
Among Vincas Grybas' most famous creations are the monuments to Simonas Daukantas in Seda, Lithuania and the statue of Vytautas the Great (1932, restored in 1991) in Kaunas. He also produced the sculpture of Petras Vileišis in Pasvalys, and a church altar in Sintautai.

== Sources ==
"Vincas Grybas" (in Lithuanian). Žemaičių dailės muziejus. Archived from the original on 2007-07-17.
