= Faustas Latėnas =

Lithuanian composer (1956–2020)

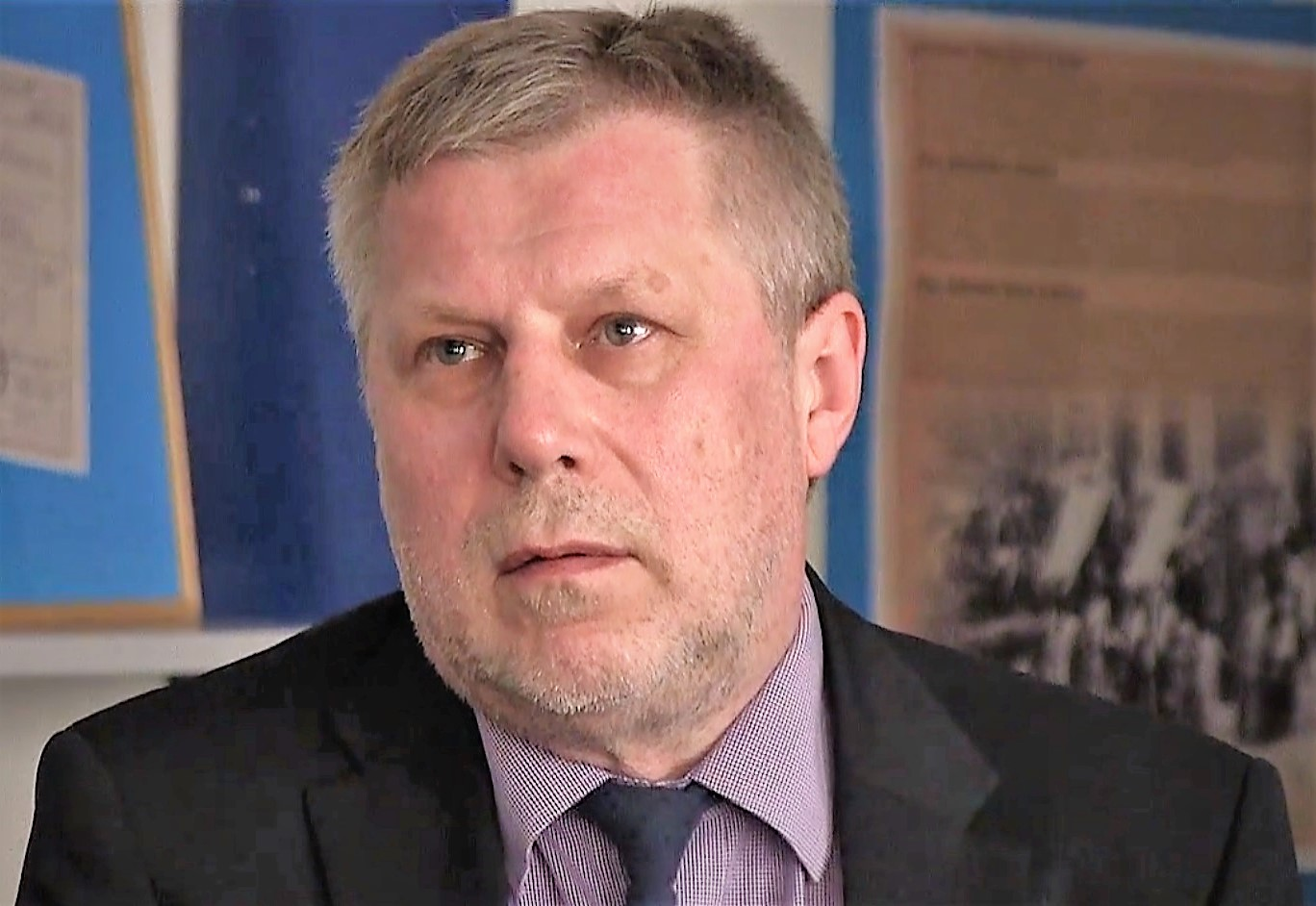
- Faustas Latėnas at the Vilnius Jewish Public Library in 2016
- Born: 16 May 1956; Dusetos, Lithuanian SSR, Soviet Union
- Died: 3 November 2020 (aged 64); Vilnius, Lithuania
- Education: Juozas Gruodis College of Music, Kaunas; Lithuanian Academy of Music and Theatre
- Occupations: Composer; Theatre manager; Vice-minister of culture; Cultural attaché
- Organizations: Vilniaus teatras Lėlė; National Small Theatre; Lithuanian National Drama Theatre; Lithuanian Ministry of Culture
- Awards: Lithuanian National Culture and Art Prize

Faustas Latėnas (16 May 1956 – 3 November 2020) was a Lithuanian composer, theatre manager, politician and diplomat. He composed mostly incidental music, and also scores for films and television. He was vice-minister of the Lithuanian Ministry of Culture, advisor to the prime minister in cultural affairs, and cultural attaché in Moscow. He composed incidental music for 200 drama and puppet theatre productions, and received the Lithuanian National Culture and Art Prize.

== Life and career ==
Born in Dusetos, Latėnas studied composition, first at the Kaunas Juozo Gruodžio Conservatory in Kaunas with Giedrius Kuprevičius, graduating in 1975, then at the Lithuanian Academy of Music and Theatre in Vilnius with Eduardas Balsys, graduating in 1980. He shared his teacher's love for Latin American dances. His first position was director of music at the puppet theatre Lėlė, becoming the theatre's director in 1990. From 1991, he was director of music department at the National Small Theatre of Vilnius.

From 1996, he was vice-minister of the Lithuanian Ministry of Culture, also the country's advisor for cultural affairs the following year. He was from 1999 director of the National Drama Theatre, and from 2000 director of the National Small Theatre of Vilnius. In 2005, he served again as vice-minister. From 2006 to 2008, he was cultural advisor to the Prime Minister. He was cultural attaché at the Embassy of Lithuania in Moscow from 2011 to 2012, and then again advisor to the Prime Minister until 2016.

Latėnas received the Lithuanian National Culture and Art Prize for "The sounding Lithuanian theatre, and music as a worthwhile counterpart in theatrical action". In June 2016, the Lithuanian National Philharmonic Society organised a concert on the occasion of his 60th birthday, entitled Faustas Latėnas. Music as Theatre. Instrumental soloists and ensembles, the Vilnius State Choir and the Lithuanian National Symphony Orchestra, conducted by Robertas Šervenikas, performed works by Latėnas including chamber music and Agnus Dei for choir, organ and orchestra.

Latėnas died at age 64. He was buried at Antakalnis Cemetery three days later.

== Work ==
Latėnas composed incidental music for 200 drama and puppet theatre productions, often recognized by awards. Even his non-theatrical works often sound dramatic. He named his style "post-social realism", expressing emotional aspects such as "joy, sadness and sarcasm". He composed for a 2019 Dutch-Lithuanian collaboration for The King Ubu at the Lele Theatre.

He also composed soundtracks for nine films, including My Little Wife, The Children from the Hotel America and Wooden Staircase, and for 20 documentaries, and music for five television productions. He said:

I have always regarded theatre as a refreshing current in my concert music, something like an islet where one is free to incarnate the most radical, banal, or quirky thoughts, because the attitude to theatre music has always been more lenient.

The 1978 Cello Sonata was recorded by David Geringas and Indrė Baikštytė in a collection "Sound of Lithuania". Chamber music by Latėnas was recorded in 2006, including the Flute Sonata (1977), the Cello Sonata (1978), the Violin Sonata (1983) and the String Quartet No. 2 "Šviesiam atminimui" ("In loving memory", 1986). The composer said that he dedicated the string quartet "to the loving memory of all the good friends who emigrated from Lithuania; it's music for the loving memory of all the happy moments I've experienced; it is music for a loving memory of all dear people who are no longer with us". Another CD, ...in extremis..., included in 2008 the String Quartet No. 1 "...in extremis...", piano music, and the Rondo Sonata for Saxophone and Piano.
