= Laisvės alėja =

Street in Kaunas, Lithuania

Coordinates: 54°53′50″N 23°54′49″E

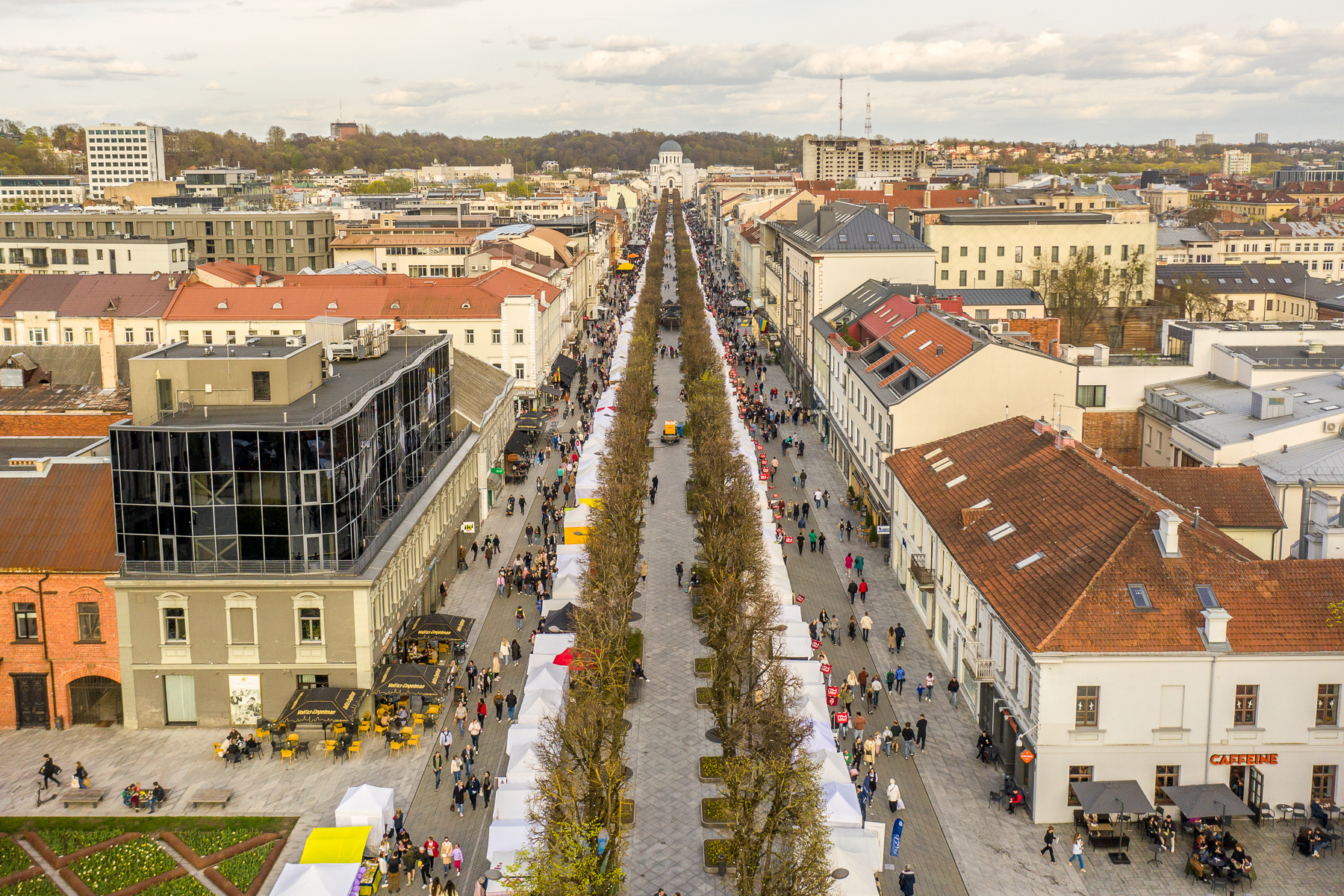
Laisvės Alėja in 2023

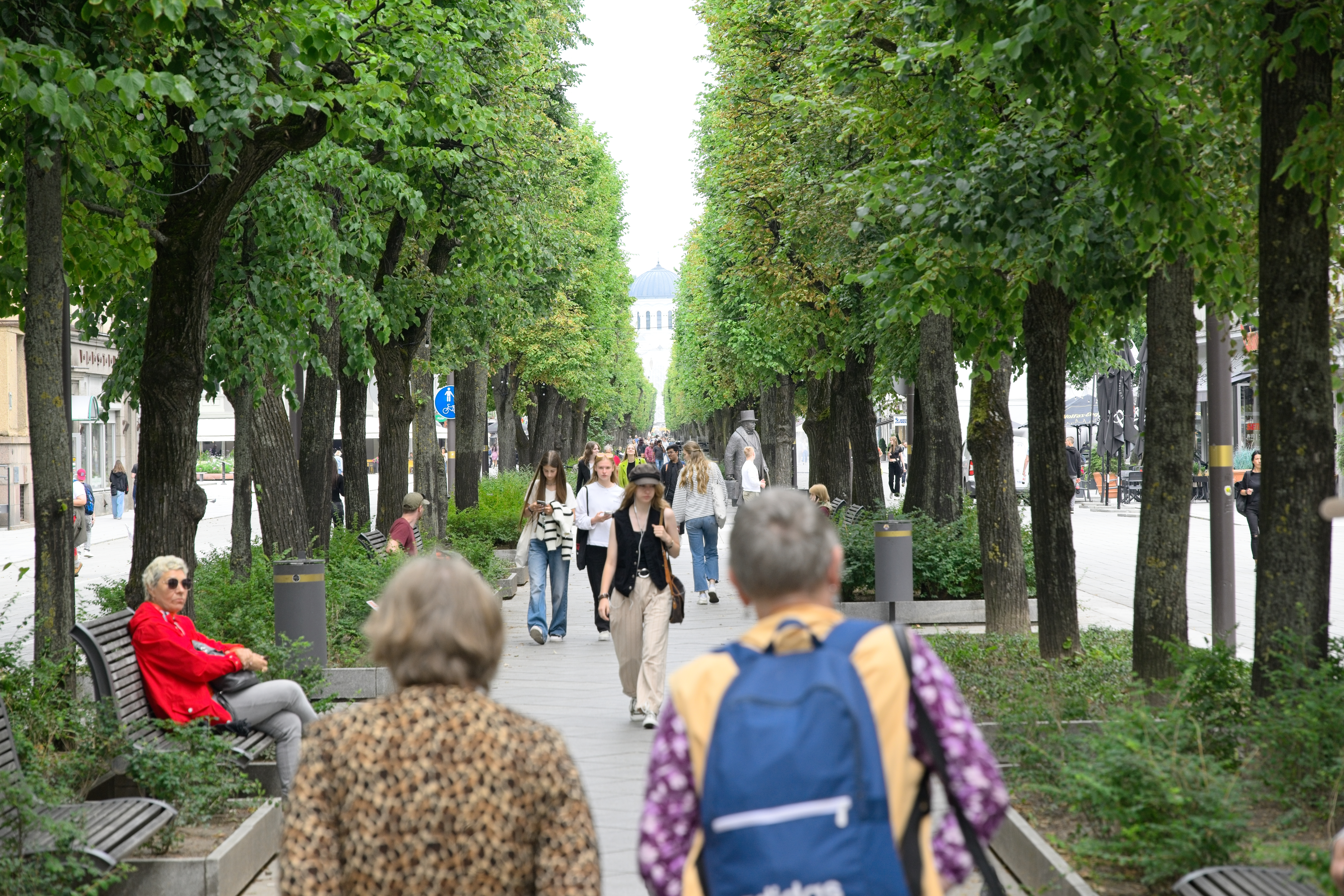
Central view

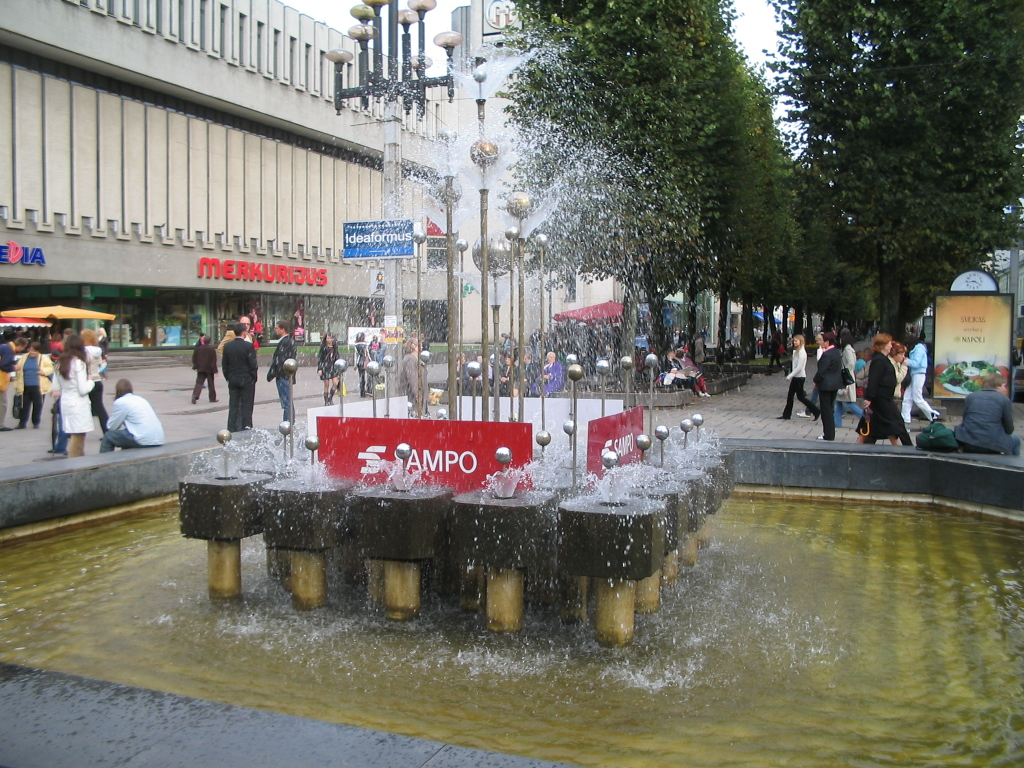
A fountain in the Avenue

Laisvės Alėja (literally Liberty Boulevard or Liberty Avenue) is a prominent pedestrian street in the city of Kaunas, Lithuania. It is the longest pedestrian street in Eastern Europe

== History ==
Much of the construction around Laisvės Alėja originally took place during the latter half of the 19th century and into the beginning of the 20th century. At the time, Kaunas Fortress was also being constructed around the city. As a result, all the buildings were limited to a height of 2–3 floors, with a few exceptions such as St. Michael the Archangel's church, built in 1895.

In 1982, Laisvės Alėja was reconstructed according to plans of architects V. Palauskas and V. Paleckienė, and completely transformed into pedestrian area (as it was planned as early as 1953). For a long time it was the main commercial district of Kaunas.

== Location and description ==
Laisvės Alėja stretches between the St. Michael the Archangel's Byzantine-style church to the Central Post Office and Tadas Ivanauskas Zoological Museum, around the Kaunas Old Town, the oldest section of Kaunas. Stretching for 1.6 kilometres (1 mi), Laisvės Alėja is the longest pedestrian street in Eastern Europe. Motor vehicles cannot travel along Laisvės Alėja, but can cross it at intersections with other streets where motor traffic is permitted. The boulevard is separated into two walkways by a median strip lined with linden trees.

== Notable buildings ==
Both Kaunas State Musical Theatre and National Kaunas Drama Theatre (no.71) are located along the street, as well as the Kaunas Red Cross Hospital.

== Image gallery ==
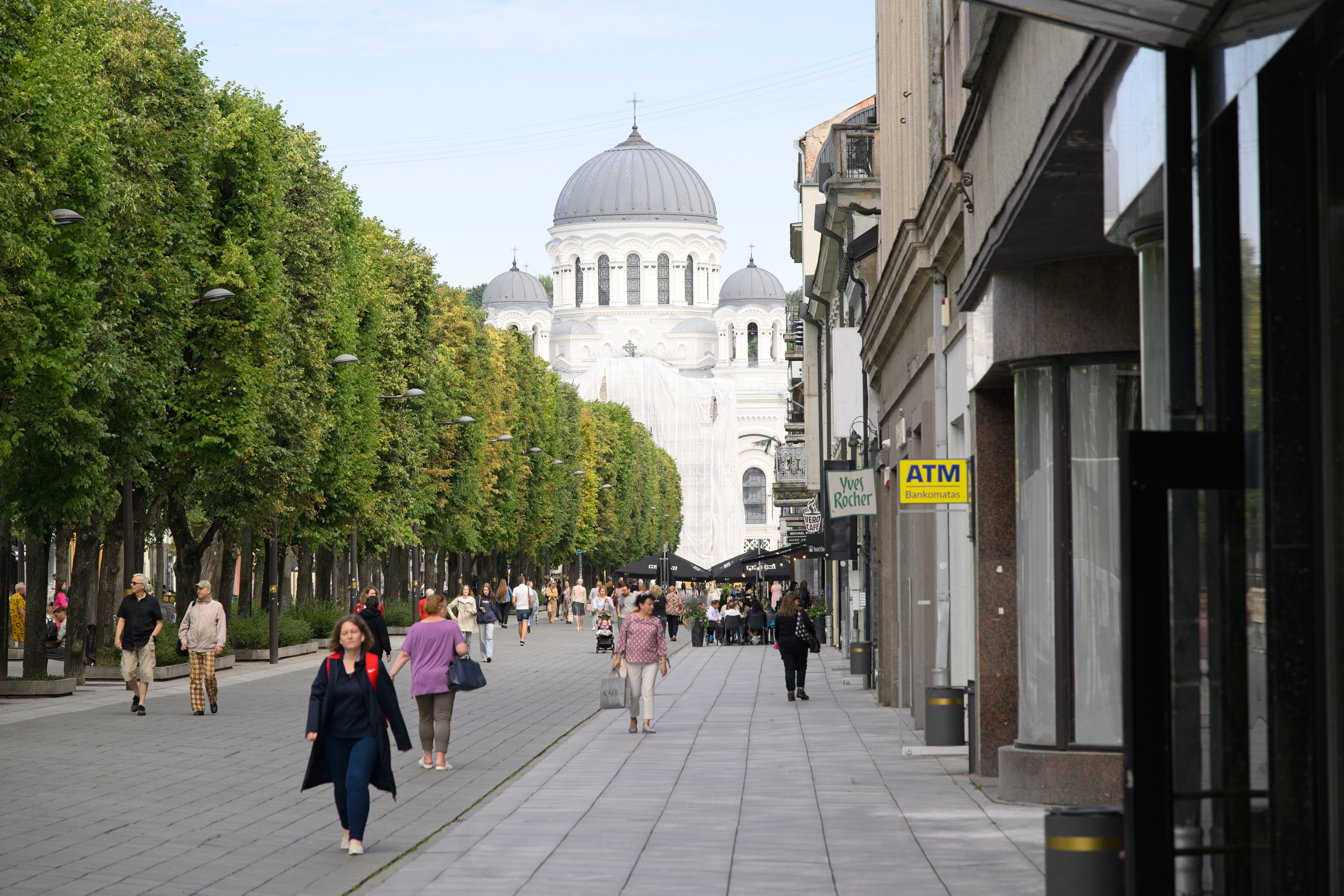
Laisvės Alėja with St. Michael the Archangel's church in the background

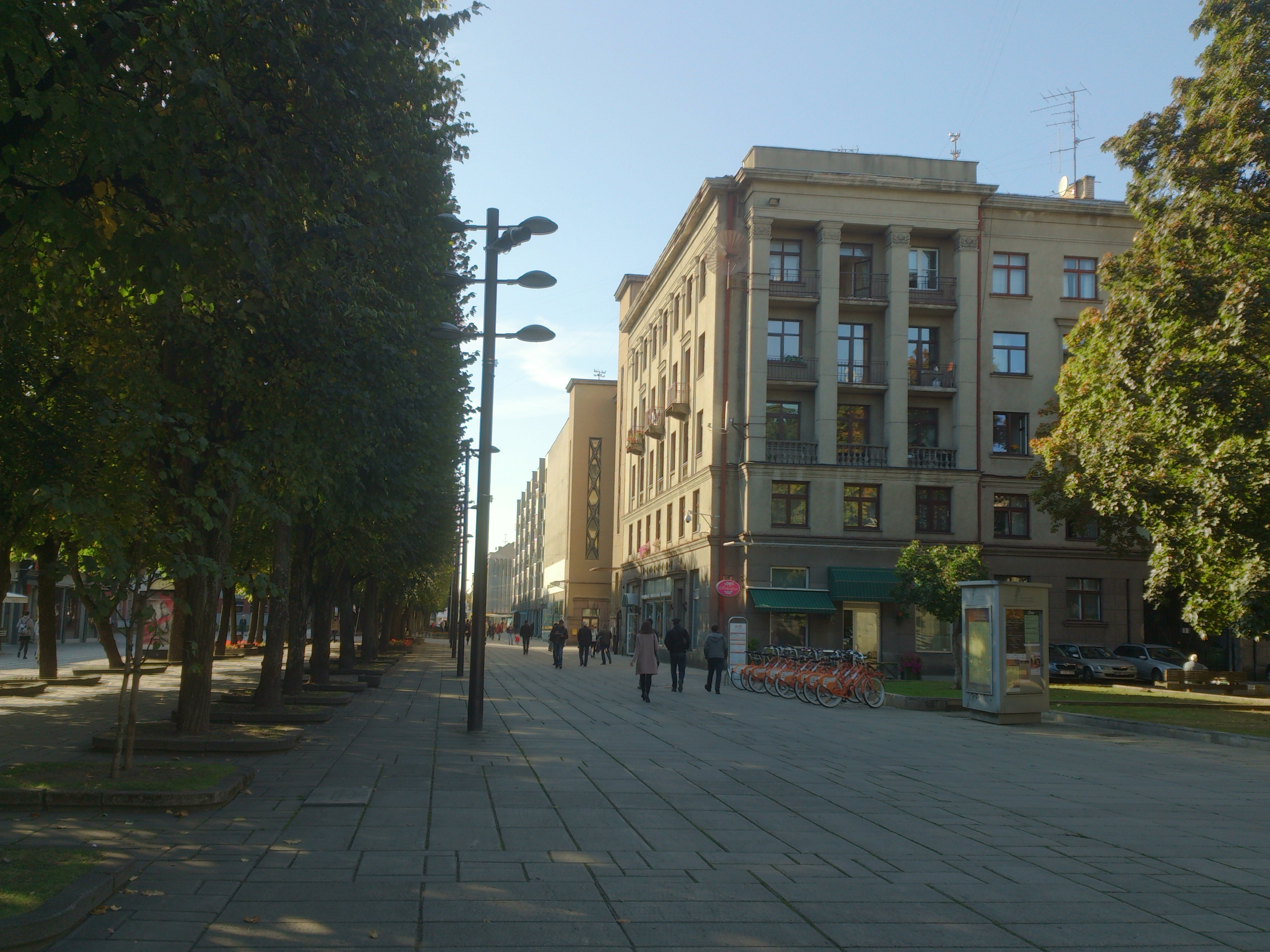

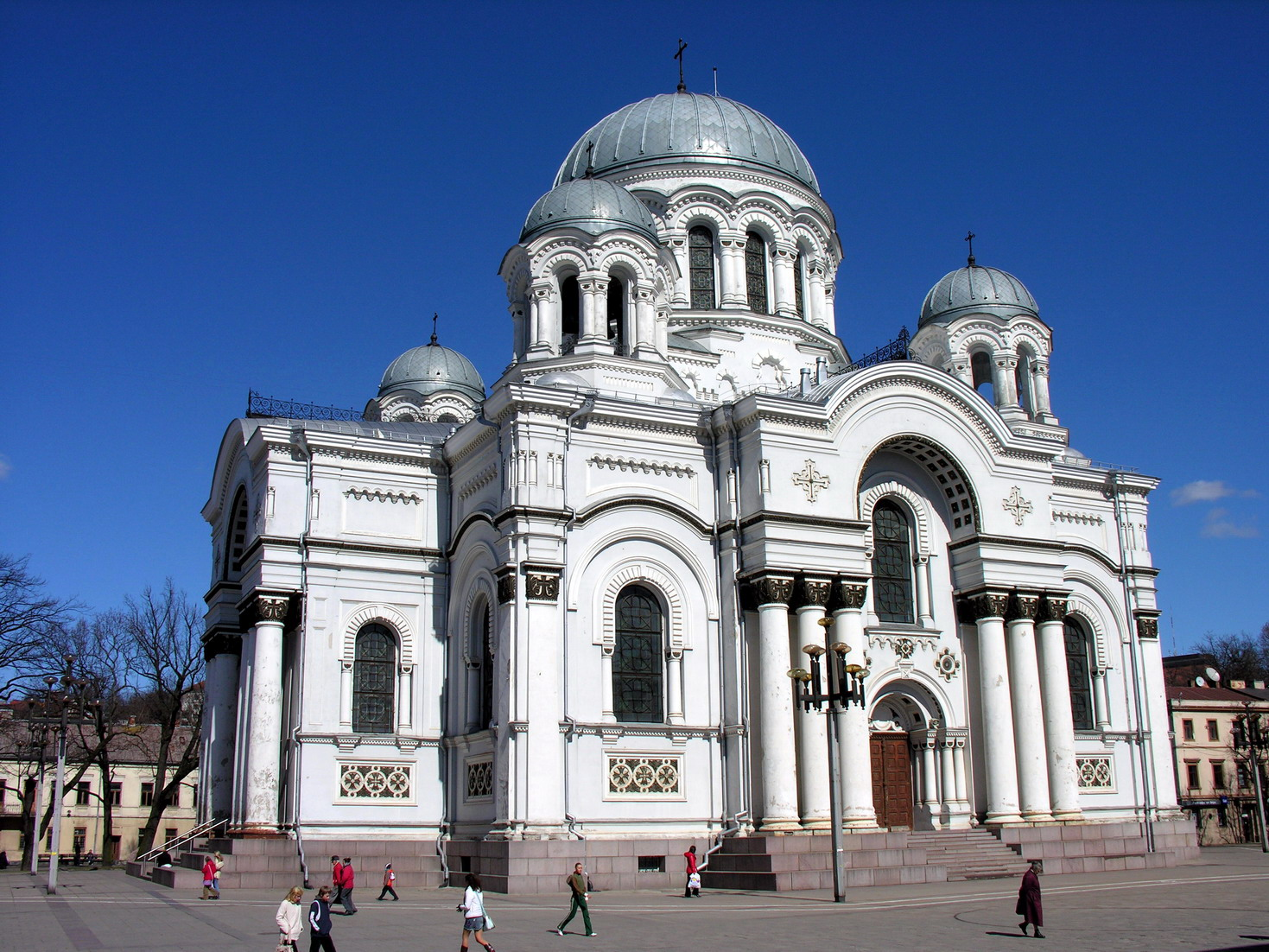
St. Michael the Archangel's church (Sobor)

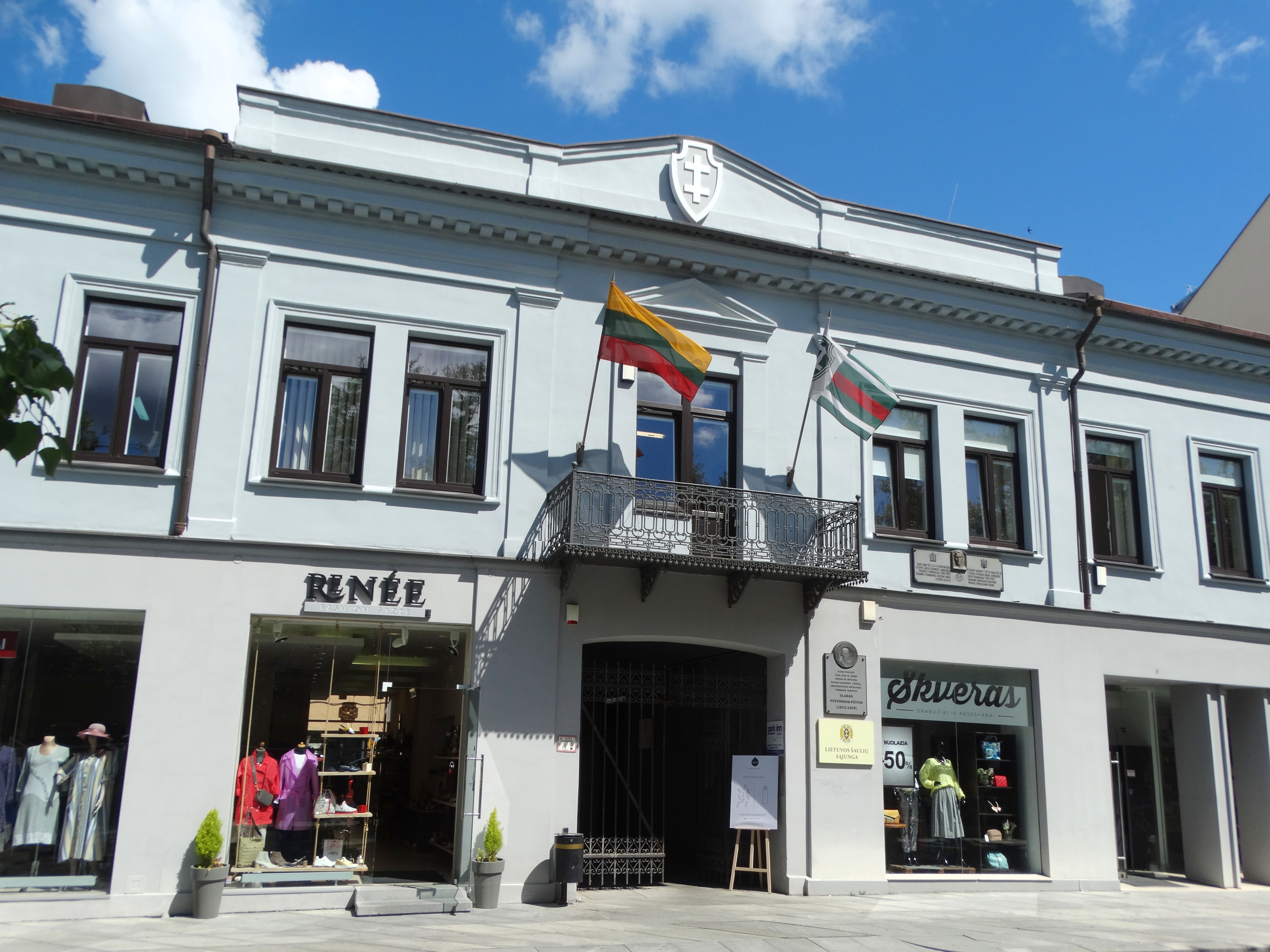
Headquarters of the Lithuanian Riflemen's Union

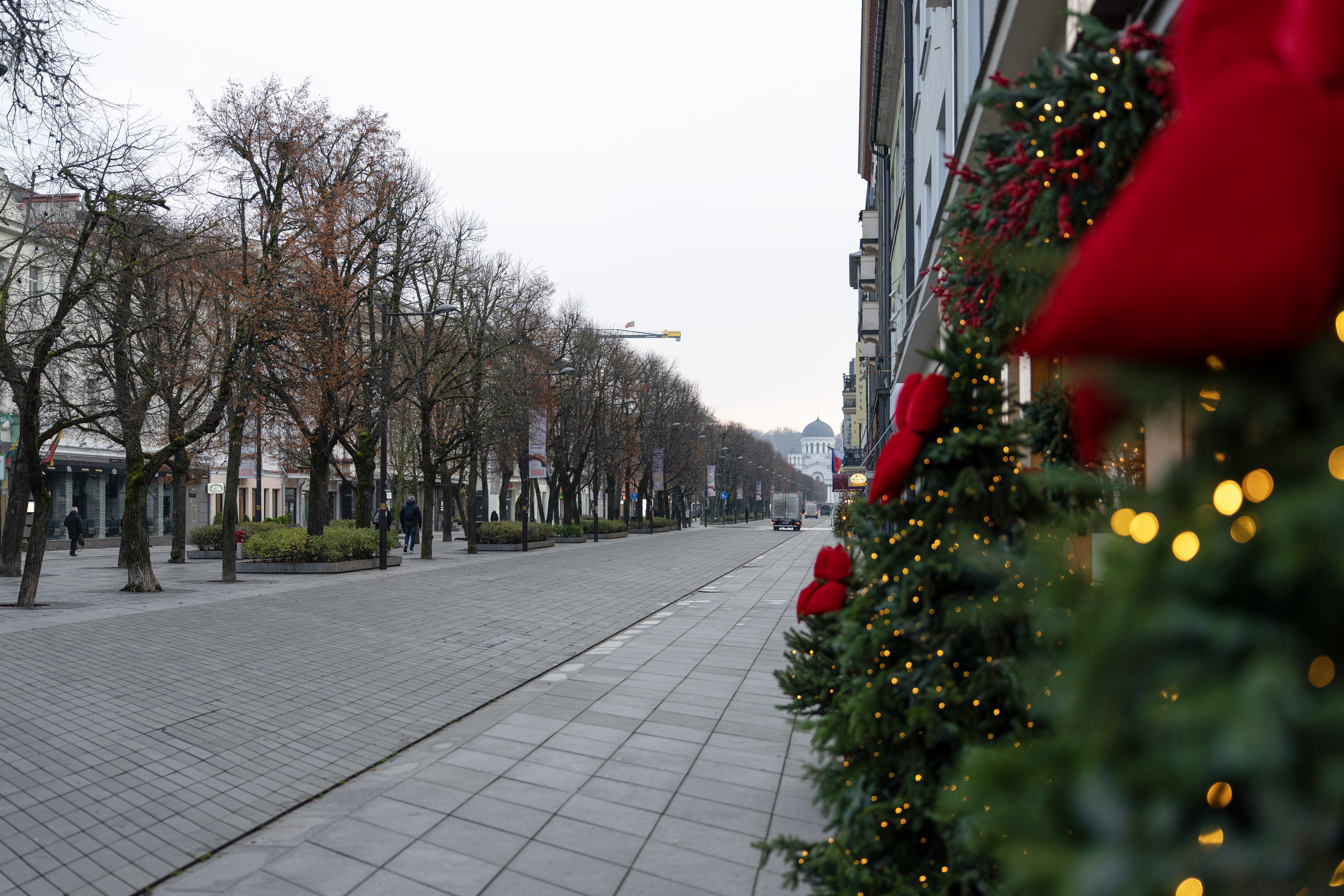
During Christmas season

== See also ==
- Statue of Vytautas the Great
