= Cathedral Basilica of Győr =

Coordinates: 47.6890°N 17.6313°E

Cathedral Basilica of the Assumption of Our Lady
- Mennyekbe Fölvett Boldogságos Szűz Mária székesegyház
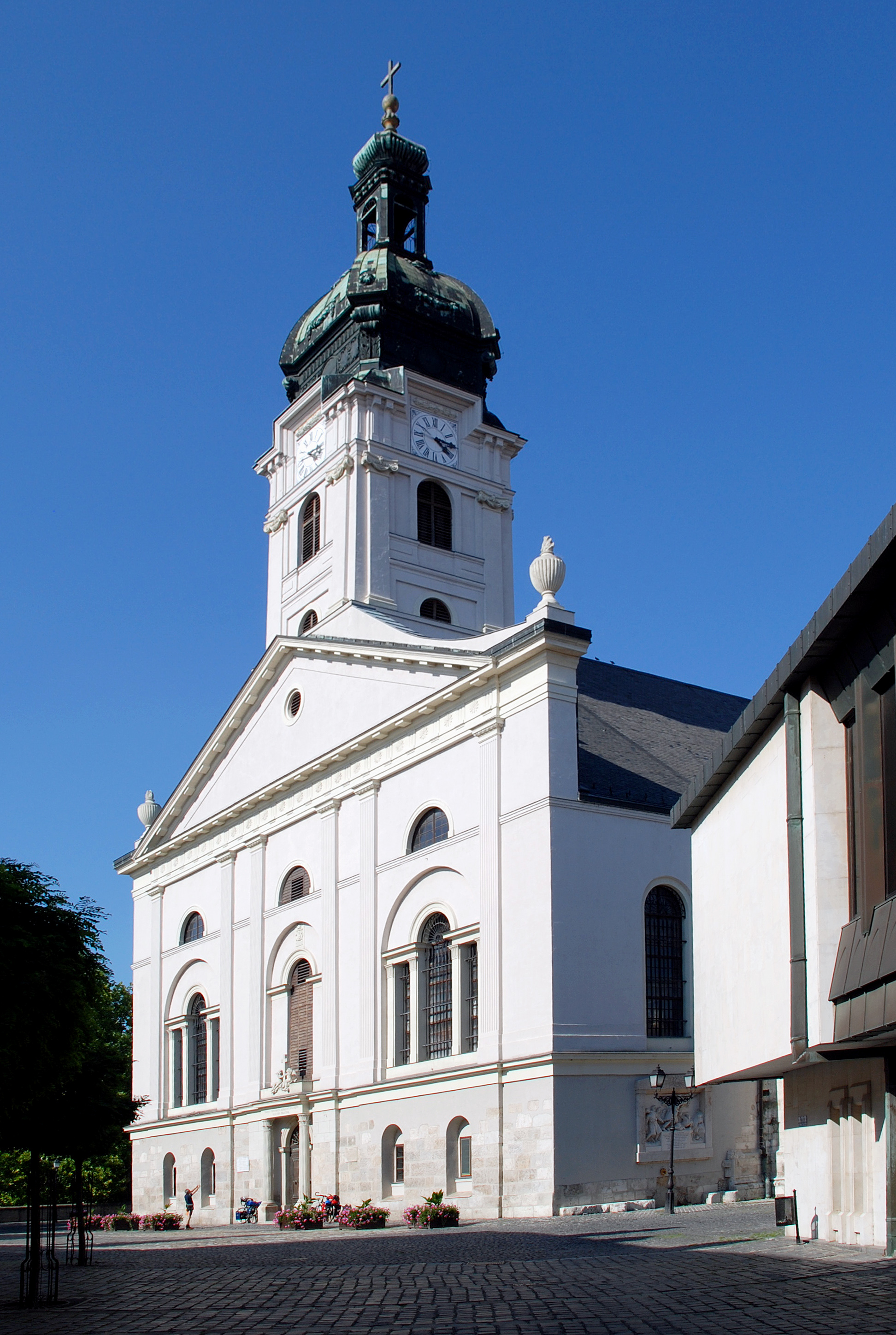
- Cathedral Basilica of the Assumption of Our Lady
- Location: Győr
- Country: Hungary
- Denomination: Roman Catholic Church

Architecture
- Style: Baroque architecture

Administration
- Diocese: Roman Catholic Diocese of Győr

The Cathedral Basilica of the Assumption of Our Lady (also called Győr Cathedral; Hungarian: Mennyekbe Fölvett Boldogságos Szűz Mária székesegyház) is a Catholic church that serves as cathedral basilica in Győr, Hungary, being the seat of the Diocese of Győr.

The early 11th-century Romanesque church was destroyed by the Mongols and rebuilt from the thirteenth to the fifteenth century. After the expulsion of the Turks, the interior was redesigned between 1635 and 1650 by the Italian master Giovanni Battista Rava in early Baroque style. The tower was completed only in 1680. The construction of the church lasted until the 1770s. The last restoration was carried out between 1968 and 1972. In 1997, the cathedral obtained the status of minor basilica, awarded by Pope John Paul II.

== Pulpit ==
The pulpit belongs to the same period as the interior when the most important Baroque features were added under Bishop Count Ferenc Zichy in the 1770s. Its architect and sculptor remains unknown but it is attributed to Melchior Hefele. The classicizing late Baroque structure was built at the first pillar of the nave on the left side. It was made of red marble with a marble side stair supported by a pillar; the main support forms a Doric column with a fluted shaft.

The pulpit itself is shaped like a shell with a solid parapet articulated by panels and pilasters and decorated with gilt wooden carvings of rosettes, bay leaf garlands and acanthus leaves. The wrought-iron railing was made in 1783 by a craftsman who carved the date and his initials (J. K.) into the doorway post. The railing and the door are richly decorated with roses, garlands, leaves and bows. The abat-voix is painted woodwork with dark yellow marbleizing, decorated with rosettes, brackets and leaves. On the underside there is a silvery dove surrounded by a meander strip; on the top an allegorical female statue representing the Church is holding a chalice and a church model. The canopy-like base of the statue is decorated with wreathes and it is surrounded by four putti holding the Tablets of Stone and the cross, flanked by flowering urns. The statues of the abat-voix were created in a more traditional Baroque style than the other parts of the pulpit, which show the growing influence of Neoclassicism.

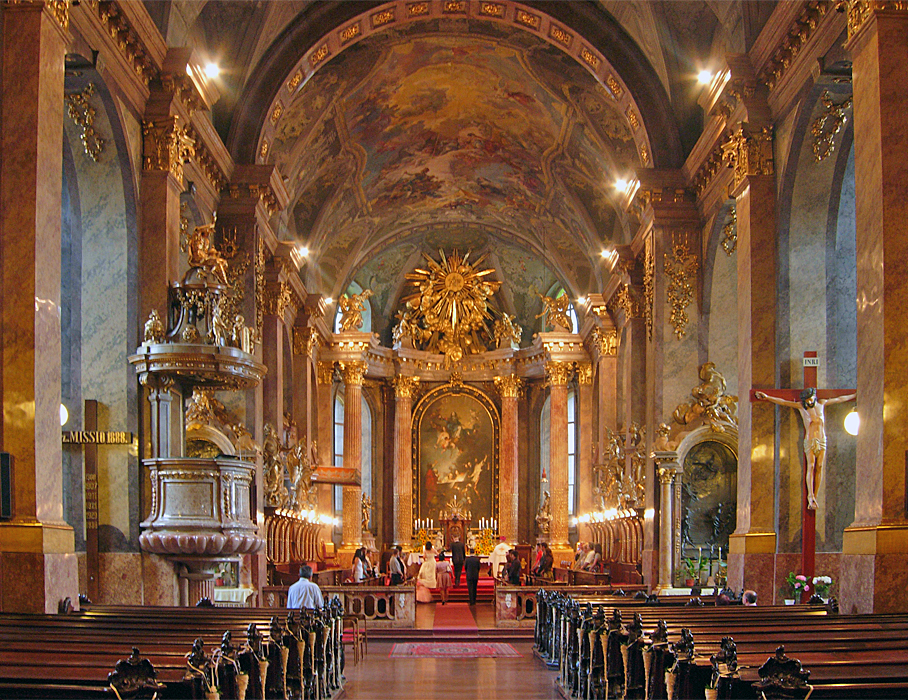
Internal view

== Herma of King Saint Ladislaus ==
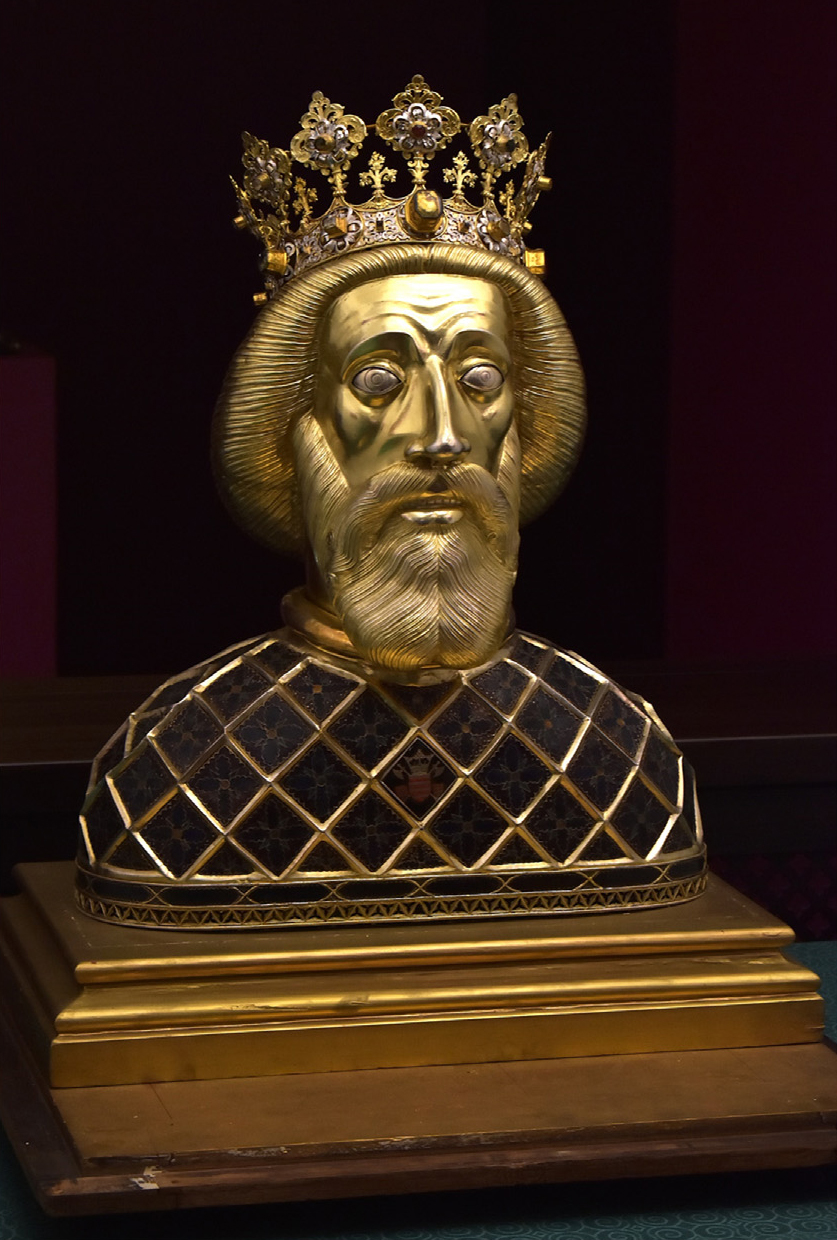
Herm of Ladislaus I of Hungary (15th century) containing his skull, held in the Cathedral Basilica of Győr

The skull relic in the Saint Ladislaus' Herma preserved in the Cathedral Basilica, is one of the most important relics for Hungarians.

King Ladislaus I of Hungary completed the work of Stephen I of Hungary, consolidating Hungarian state power and strengthening Christianity in Hungary. He was canonized in 1192 at the request of King Béla III of Hungary, and his body was exhumed to prepare relics from his skull and other skeletal remains.

According to historian György Szabados, Gyula László proved in 1965 that the face of the Saint Ladislaus' Herma depicts King Béla III. The skull reconstruction of his tomb in the Basilica of the Assumption of the Blessed Virgin Mary, Székesfehérvár also shows the face of the Herma, which is not surprising, because Ladislaus had already been dead for 97 years in 1192, so only the then living king from the same family, Béla III was worthy to sit as a model for the face of the Herma.

The wooden herm containing the skull was damaged in a fire in 1406, but the skull has been preserved unharmed. Later it was placed into the current Herma created during the reign of King Sigismund of Hungary. In the 16th century, the relic had to be rescued from Várad due to the ravage of Transylvania by the Protestants. In the first decades of the 17th century, it reached its current location in the Cathedral of Győr after passing through Prague, Pozsony (now Bratislava) and Veszprém.

== See also ==
- Roman Catholicism in Hungary
- List of cathedrals in Hungary
- Assumption Cathedral (disambiguation), other cathedrals with the same dedication
