= Ladislaus I of Hungary =

King of Hungary from 1077 to 1095

Saint Ladislaus I
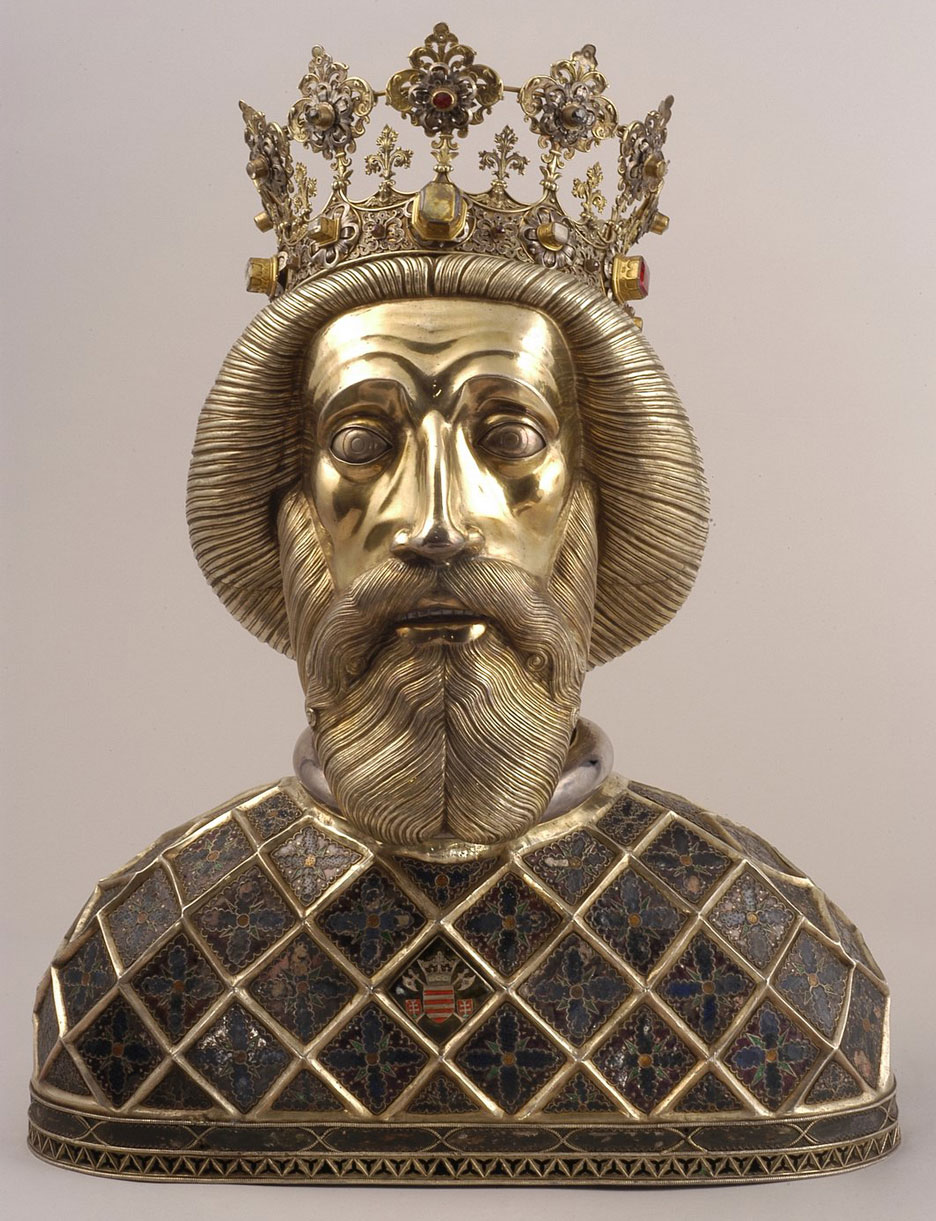
- Herm of Saint Ladislaus containing his skull, held in the Cathedral Basilica of Győr

King of Hungary Contested by Solomon until 1081
- Reign: 25 April 1077 – 29 July 1095
- Coronation: 1077, Székesfehérvár
- Predecessor: Géza I
- Successor: Coloman

King of Croatia Contested by Petar Snačić
- Reign: 1091 – 29 July 1095
- Predecessor: Stephen II
- Successor: Petar Snačić
- Regent: Álmos as Duke
- Born: 27 June 1040; Kraków, Kingdom of Poland
- Died: 29 July 1095 (aged 55); Nitra, Kingdom of Hungary
- Burial: Cathedral-Basilica of Nagyvárad (today Oradea, Romania)
- Spouse: Adelaide of Rheinfelden
- Issue more...: Piroska, Byzantine Empress; A princess of Volhynia
- Dynasty: Árpád dynasty
- Father: Béla I of Hungary
- Mother: Richeza or Adelaide of Poland
- Religion: Roman Catholic

Ladislaus I (Hungarian: I. László, Croatian: Ladislav I., Slovak: Ladislav I., Polish: Władysław I; 27 June 1040 – 29 July 1095), also known as Saint Ladislas, was King of Hungary from 1077 and King of Croatia from 1091. He was the second son of King Béla I of Hungary and Richeza (or Adelaide) of Poland. After Béla's death in 1063, Ladislaus and his elder brother, Géza, acknowledged their cousin Solomon as the lawful king in exchange for receiving their father's former duchy, which included one-third of the kingdom. They cooperated with Solomon for the next decade. Ladislaus's most popular legend, which narrates his fight with a "Cuman" (a Turkic nomad marauder) who abducted a Hungarian girl, is connected to this period. The brothers' relationship with Solomon deteriorated in the early 1070s, and they rebelled against him. Géza was proclaimed king in 1074, but Solomon maintained control of the western regions of his kingdom. During Géza's reign, Ladislaus was his brother's most influential adviser.

Géza died in 1077, and his supporters made Ladislaus king. Solomon resisted Ladislaus with assistance from King Henry IV of Germany. Ladislaus supported Henry IV's opponents during the Investiture Controversy. In 1081, Solomon abdicated and acknowledged Ladislaus's reign, but he conspired to regain the royal crown, and Ladislaus imprisoned him. Ladislaus canonized the first Hungarian saints (including his distant relatives, King Stephen I and Duke Emeric) in 1085. He set Solomon free during the canonization ceremony.

After a series of civil wars, Ladislaus's main focus was the restoration of public safety. He introduced severe legislation, punishing those who violated property rights with death or mutilation. He occupied almost all Croatia in 1091, which marked the beginning of an expansion period for the medieval Kingdom of Hungary. Ladislaus's victories over the Pechenegs and Cumans ensured the security of his kingdom's eastern borders for about 150 years. His relationship with the Holy See deteriorated during the last years of his reign, as the popes claimed that Croatia was their fief, but Ladislaus denied their claims.

Ladislaus was canonized on 27 June 1192 by Pope Celestine III. Legends depict him as a pious knight-king, "the incarnation of the late-medieval Hungarian ideal of chivalry." He is a popular saint in Hungary and neighboring nations, where many churches are dedicated to him.

== Early years (before 1064) ==
Ladislaus was the second son of the future King Béla I of Hungary and his wife, Richeza (or Adelaide), who was a daughter of King Mieszko II Lambert of Poland. Ladislaus and his elder brother, Géza, were born in Poland, where Béla had settled in the 1030s after being banished from Hungary. Ladislaus was born around 1040. Ladislaus's "physical and spiritual makeup testified to God's gracious will even at his birth", according to his late-12th-century Legend. The almost contemporaneous Gallus Anonymus wrote that Ladislaus was "raised from childhood in Poland" and almost became a "Pole in his ways and life". He received a Slavic name: "Ladislaus" is derived from "Vladislav".

Béla and his family returned to Hungary around 1048. Béla received the so-called "Duchy" – which encompassed one-third of the kingdom – from his brother, King Andrew I of Hungary. The Illuminated Chronicle mentions that Andrew's son, Solomon, "was anointed king with the consent of Duke Bela and his sons Geysa and Ladislaus" in 1057 or 1058.

Béla, who had been Andrew's heir before Solomon's coronation, left for Poland in 1059; his sons accompanied him. They returned with Polish reinforcements and began a rebellion against Andrew. After defeating Andrew, Béla was crowned king on 6 December 1060. Solomon left the country, taking refuge in the Holy Roman Empire. Béla I died on 11 September 1063, some time before German troops entered Hungary in order to restore Solomon. Ladislaus and his brothers, Géza and Lampert, went back to Poland, and Solomon was once again crowned king in Székesfehérvár. The three brothers returned when the Germans left Hungary. To avoid another civil war, the brothers signed a treaty with Solomon on 20 January 1064, acknowledging Solomon's reign in exchange for their father's duchy.

== Duke in Hungary (1064–1077) ==
Ladislaus and Géza probably divided the administration of their duchy; Ladislaus seems to have received the regions around Bihar (now Biharia, Romania). Géza and Ladislaus cooperated with King Solomon between 1064 and 1071. The most popular story in Ladislaus's later legends – his fight with a "Cuman" warrior who abducted a Christian maiden – occurred during this period. The relationship between the king and his cousins became tense in the early 1070s. When Géza accompanied Solomon on a military campaign against the Byzantine Empire in 1072, Ladislaus stayed behind with half of the ducal troops in Nyírség to "avenge his brother with a strong hand" if Solomon harmed Géza.

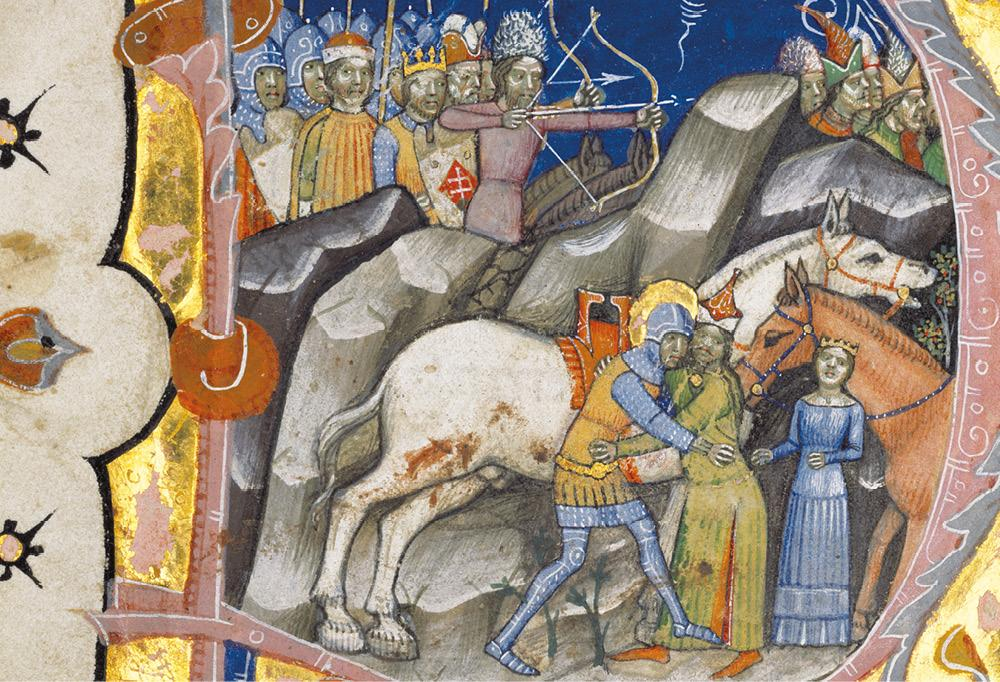
After the Battle of Kerlés in 1068, Saint Ladislaus is fighting a duel with a Cuman warrior who kidnapped a girl (Chronicon Pictum, 1358)

Realizing that another civil war was inevitable, the king and dukes launched negotiations to obtain the assistance of foreign powers. First, Ladislaus visited the Kievan Rus', but he returned without reinforcements. He then went to Moravia, and persuaded Duke Otto I of Olomouc to accompany him back to Hungary with Czech troops. By the time they returned to Hungary, the royal army had already invaded the duchy and routed Géza's troops at the Battle of Kemej on 26 February 1074. Ladislaus met his fleeing brother at Vác, and they decided to continue the fight against Solomon. A legend preserved in the Illuminated Chronicle mentions that before the battle, Ladislaus "saw in broad daylight a vision from heaven" of an angel placing a crown on Géza's head. Another legendary episode also predicted the dukes' triumph over the king: an "ermine of purest white" jumped from a thorny bush to Ladislaus's lance and then onto his chest. The decisive Battle of Mogyoród was fought on 14 March 1074. Ladislaus commanded "the troops from Byhor" on the left flank. Solomon was defeated, but instead of surrendering to his cousins, he fled to the western borders of the kingdom to seek assistance from his brother-in-law Henry IV of Germany.

Géza was proclaimed king, but Solomon established himself in Moson and Pressburg (now Bratislava, Slovakia). During his brother's reign, Ladislaus administered all of their father's former duchy. He repelled Solomon's attack on Nyitra (present-day Nitra, Slovakia) in August or September 1074, but he could not seize Pressburg. Ladislaus was also his brother's main advisor. Legend says that Géza decided to build a church dedicated to the Holy Virgin in Vác after Ladislaus explained the significance of the wondrous appearance of a red deer at the place where the church would be erected:

As [King Géza and Duke Ladislaus] were standing at a spot near [Vác], where is now the church of the blessed apostle Peter, a stag appeared to them with many candles burning upon his horns, and it began to run swifly before them towards the wood, and at the spot where is now the monastery, it halted and stood still. When the soldiers shot their arrows at it, it leapt into the Danube, and they saw it no more. At this sight the blessed Ladislaus said: "Truly that was no stag, but an angel from God." And King [Géza] said: "Tell me, beloved brother, what may all the candles signify which we saw burning on the stag's horns." The blessed Ladislaus answered: "They are not horns, but wings; they are not burning candles, but shining feathers. It has shown to us that we are to build the church of the Blessed Virgin on the place where it planted its feet, and not elsewhere."

— The Hungarian Illuminated Chronicle

== His reign ==
=== Consolidation (1077–1085) ===
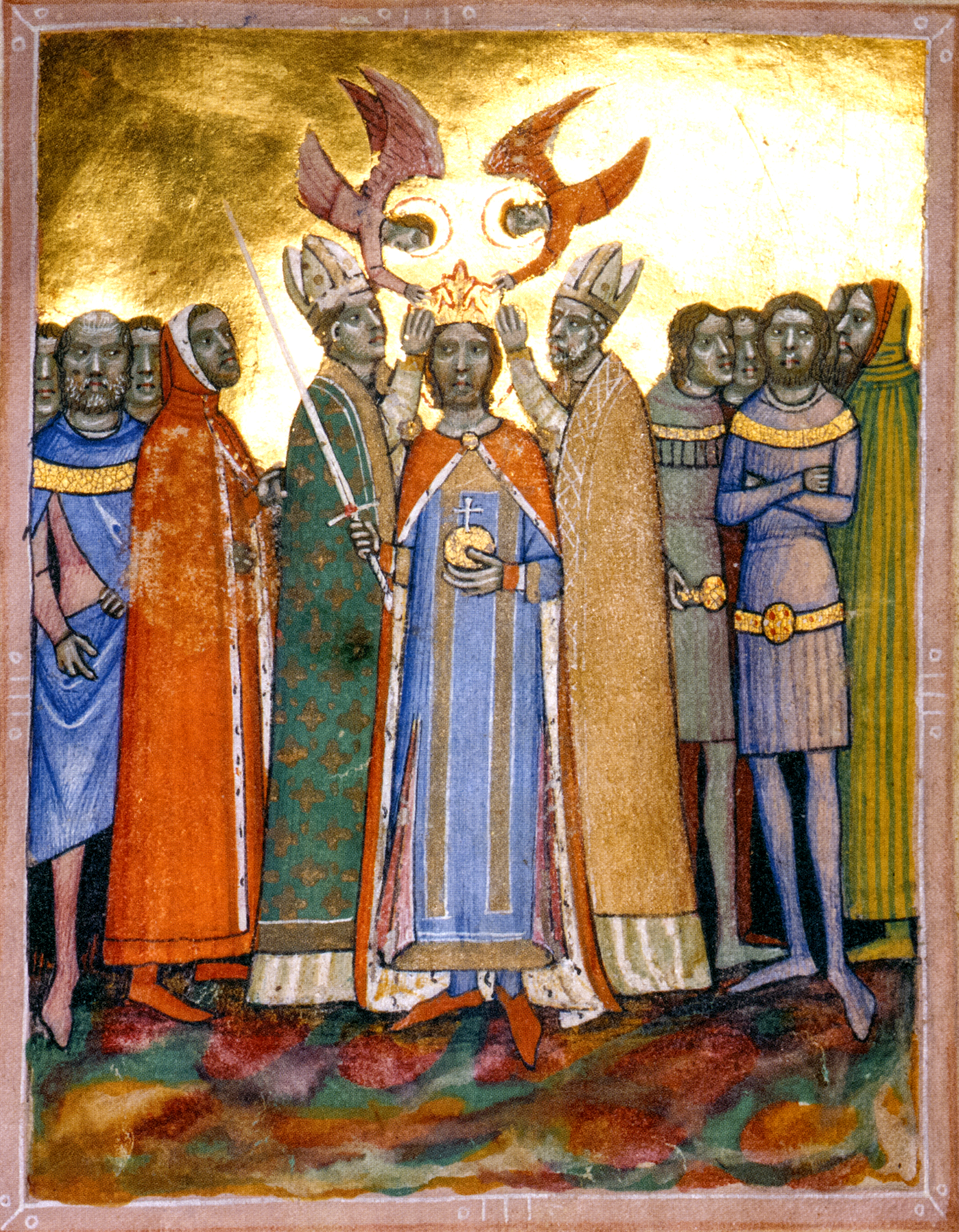
Angels crowning King Saint Ladislaus (Chronicon Pictum, 1358)

Géza I died on 25 April 1077. Since Géza's sons, Coloman and Álmos, were minors, his supporters proclaimed Ladislaus king instead. Gallus Anonymus emphasizes that King Boleslaus II the Bold of Poland "drove out" Solomon "from Hungary with his forces, and placed [Ladislaus] on the throne"; Boleslaus even called Ladislaus "his king". Although the Illuminated Chronicle emphasizes that Ladislaus "never placed the crown upon his head, for he desired a heavenly crown rather than the earthly crown of a mortal king", all his coins depict him wearing a crown, suggesting that Ladislaus was actually crowned around 1078. Shortly after his coronation, Ladislaus promulgated two law books, which incorporated the decisions of an assembly of the "magnates of the kingdom", held in Pannonhalma. The majority of these laws were draconian measures to defend private property, showing that Ladislaus primarily focused on internal consolidation and security during the first years of his reign. Those who were caught stealing were to be executed, and even criminals who committed minor offenses against property rights were blinded or sold as slaves. His other laws regulated legal proceedings and economic matters, including the issuing of judicial summons and the royal monopoly on salt trade.

If someone, freeman or bondman, should be caught in theft, he shall be hanged. But if he flees to the church to evade the gallows, he shall be led out of the church and blinded. A bondman caught in theft, if he does not flee to the church, shall be hanged; the owner of the stolen goods shall take a loss in the lost goods. The sons and daughters of a freeman caught in theft who fled to the church, was led out and blinded, if they are ten years old or less, shall retain their freedom; but if they are older than ten years they shall be reduced to servitude and lose all their property. A bondman or freeman who steals a goose or a hen shall lose one eye and shall restore what he has stolen.

— Laws of King Ladislas I

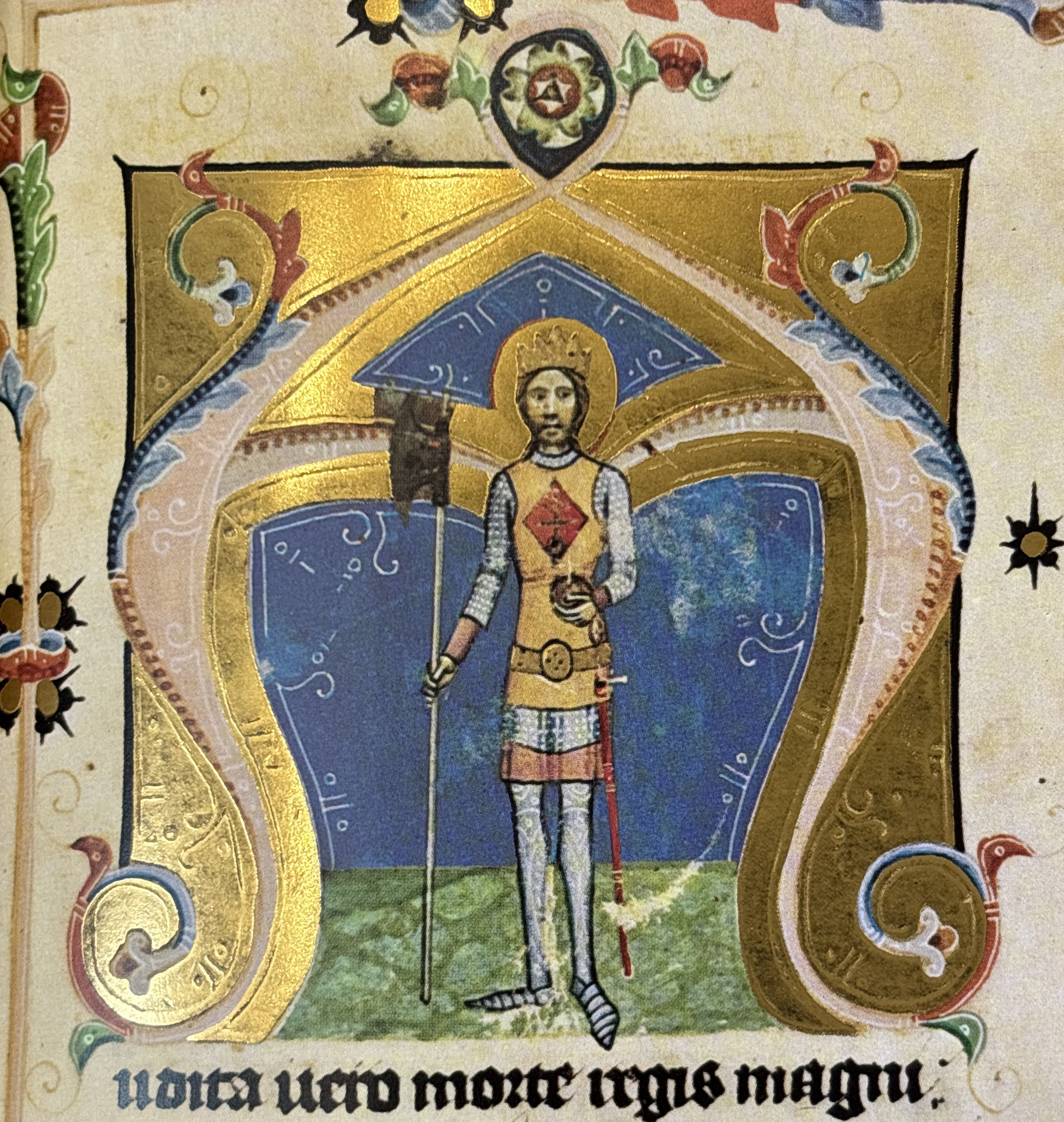
King Saint Ladislaus, the Knight King (Illuminated Chronicle)

The Illuminated Chronicle claims that Ladislaus planned to "restore the kingdom" to Solomon and "himself have the dukedom", but almost all contemporaneous sources contradict this report. Ladislaus approached Pope Gregory VII, who was the primary opponent of Solomon's ally, Henry IV of Germany. At the Pope's request, Ladislaus sheltered Bavarian nobles who had rebelled against Henry. In 1078 or 1079, Ladislaus married Adelaide, a daughter of Rudolf of Rheinfelden, whom the German princes had elected to take the place of Henry IV as king. Ladislaus supported Leopold II, Margrave of Austria, who also rebelled against Henry IV; however, the German monarch forced Leopold to surrender in May 1078.

Taking advantage of the internal conflicts in the Holy Roman Empire, Ladislaus besieged and captured the fortress of Moson from Solomon in early 1079. However, Henry IV stormed the western regions of Hungary, and secured Solomon's position. The German invasion also prevented Ladislaus from assisting Boleslaus the Bold, who fled to Hungary after his subjects expelled him from Poland. Ladislaus initiated negotiations with Solomon, who abdicated in 1080 or 1081 in exchange for "revenues sufficient to bear the expenses of a king". However, Solomon soon began conspiring against Ladislaus, and Ladislaus imprisoned him.

The first five Hungarian saints, including the first king of Hungary, Stephen I, and Stephen's son, Emeric, were canonized during Ladislaus's reign. Stephen's canonization demonstrates Ladislaus's magnanimity, because Ladislaus's grandfather, Vazul, had been blinded on Stephen's orders in the 1030s. Historian László Kontler says that the canonization ceremony, held in August 1083, was also a political act, demonstrating Ladislaus's "commitment to preserving and strengthening" the Christian state. Ladislaus even dedicated a newly established Benedictine monastery – Szentjobb Abbey – to Stephen's right arm, known as the "Holy Dexter", which was miraculously found intact. Ladislaus released Solomon at the time of the ceremony; legend said that Stephen's grave could not be opened until he did so.

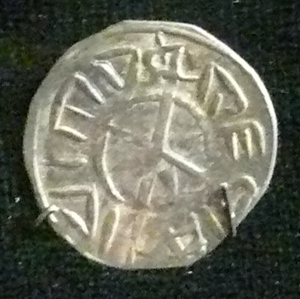
Ladislaus's denar

[The] Lord, in order to show how merciful [King Stephen I] had been while living in a mortal body, demonstrated his approval of [Stephen's revelation as a saint] before all other works when [the king] was already reigning with Christ to the point that though for three days they struggled with all their might to raise his holy body, it was not by any means to be moved from its place. For in that time, because of the sins, a grave discord arose between the said king Ladislas and his cousin Solomon, because of which, Solomon, captured, was held in prison. Therefore when they tried in vain to raise the body, a certain recluse at the church of the Holy Savior in Bökénysomlyó, by the name of Karitas, whose famous life at the time was held in esteem, confided to the king by a revelation made to her from heaven that they exerted themselves in vain; it would be impossible to transfer the relics of the holy king until unconditional pardon was offered to Solomon, setting him free from the confinement of prison. And thus, bringing him forth from the prison, and repeating the three-day fast, when the third day arrived for the transferal of the holy remains, the stone lying over the grave was lifted up with such ease as if it had been of no weight before.

— Hartvic, Life of King Stephen of Hungary

After his release, Solomon made a final effort to regain his crown. He persuaded a Pecheneg chieftain, Kutesk, to invade Hungary in 1085. Ladislaus defeated the invaders at the upper courses of the Tisza River.

=== Expansion (1085–1092) ===
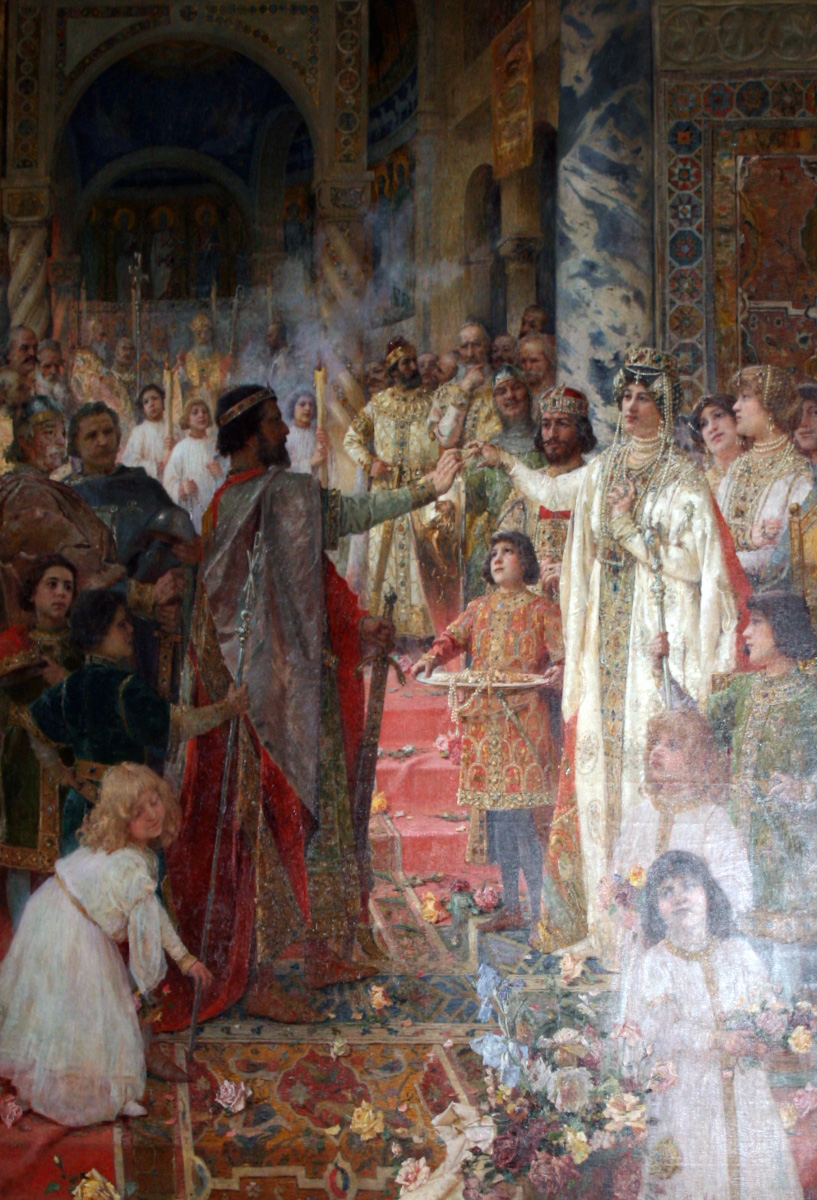
The engagement of King Demetrius Zvonimir of Croatia and Helen, sister to Ladislaus in 1075 (painting by Mato Celestin Medović)

In August 1087, German princes who opposed Henry IV's rule held a conference in Speyer. The contemporaneous Bernold of St Blasien mentions that Ladislaus sent envoys to the meeting, and "promised that he would assist [them] with 20,000 knights, if it became necessary". Ladislaus also recognized Pope Victor III as the legitimate pope, rather than Clement III, who had been elected pope at Henry IV's initiative. However, Ladislaus provided no further support to Henry IV's opponents after he was informed of Solomon's death in 1087. King Demetrius Zvonimir of Croatia's wife, Helen, was Ladislaus's sister. After the death of Zvonimir and his successor, Stephen II, a conflict developed between factions of Croatian noblemen.

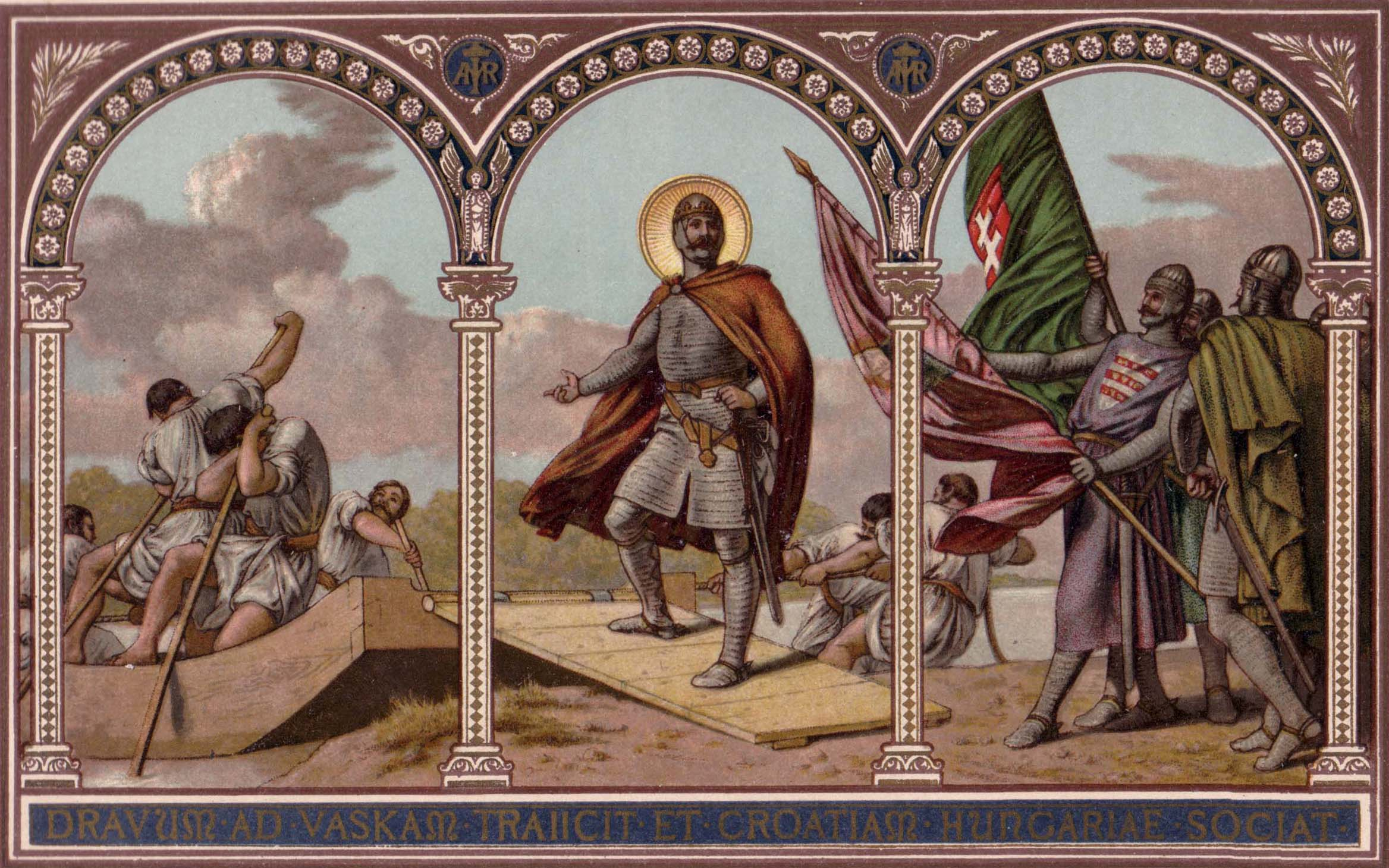
King Saint Ladislaus of Hungary crosses the river Drava to conquer Croatia (painting by Bertalan Székely, 19th century)

At Helen's request, Ladislaus intervened in the conflict and invaded Croatia in 1091. The same year, he wrote to Oderizius, Abbot of Monte Cassino in Italy, about his invasion. Thomas the Archdeacon's chronicle describes how Ladislaus "occupied the entire land from the River Drava to the mountains called the Iron Alps without encountering opposition". However, his opponents crowned a local nobleman, Petar Snačić, as king. Snačić fought in the Gvozd Mountains, preventing the complete conquest of Croatia. Ladislaus appointed his nephew, Álmos, to administer the occupied territory. Around the same time, Ladislaus set up a separate diocese in Slavonia, with its see in Zagreb. The bishop of the new see became the suffragan to the archbishop of Esztergom in Hungary.

Ladislaus admitted in his letter to Oderizius that he could not "promote the cause of earthly dignities without committing grave sins". Historian Bálint Hóman says that Ladislaus was referring to a developing conflict with Pope Urban II, who objected to Ladislaus's refusal to acknowledge the Holy See's suzerainty over Croatia. In the letter, Ladislaus styled himself as "king of the Hungarians and of Messia". Historian Ferenc Makk writes that the latter title referred to Moesia, implying that Ladislaus had taken the regions between the Great Morava and Drina rivers from the Byzantine Empire. No other documents refer to Ladislaus's occupation of Moesia, suggesting that if Ladislaus did occupy the region, he lost it quickly. Alexandru Madgearu says that "Messia" should rather be associated with Bosnia, which was occupied during Ladislaus's campaign against Croatia.

The Cumans invaded and plundered the eastern part of the kingdom in 1091. The invading Cumans were leading by chieftain Kapolcs, they broke first in Transylvania, then the territory between the Danube and Tisza rivers. The Cumans tried to leave Hungary with their huge booty and prisoners, but King Ladislaus reached and defeated them near the Temes river. Ladislaus offered the Christianity for the Cuman survivors, the majority of them accepted, thus the king settled them in Jászság. The rumor of the losing battle reached the Cuman camp, the Cumans threatened King Ladislaus with revenge and demanded to free the Cuman prisoners. King Ladislaus marched to the Hungarian border to prevent the next invasion. The two armies clashed near Severin, the Hungarian army was victorious, King Ladislaus killed Ákos, the Cuman chieftain. Makk argues that the Byzantines persuaded them to attack Hungary, while the Illuminated Chronicle states that the Cumans were incited by the "Ruthenians". In retaliation, the chronicle continues, Ladislaus invaded the neighboring Rus' principalities, forcing the "Ruthenians" to ask "for mercy" and to promise "that they would be faithful to him in all things". No Rus' chronicle documents Ladislaus's military action.

Bernold of St Blasien writes that Duke Welf of Bavaria prevented a conference that Emperor Henry IV "had arranged with the king of the Hungarians" in December 1092. A letter written by Henry refers to "the alliance into which [he] once entered" with Ladislaus. Pope Urban II also mentioned that the Hungarians "left the shepherds of their salvation", implying that Ladislaus had changed sides and acknowledged the legitimacy of Antipope Clement III. In the deed of the Benedictine Somogyvár Abbey, Ladislaus stated that the abbot should be obedient to him, proving that Ladislaus opposed the Church's independence, which was demanded by the Gregorian Reforms. Ladislaus personally presided over an assembly of the Hungarian prelates that met in Szabolcs on 21 May 1091. The synod recognized the legitimacy of a clergyman's first marriage, in contrast to the requirements of canon law, which states that members of the clergy may not marry at all. According to a scholarly theory, the sees of the dioceses of Kalocsa and Bihar were moved to Bács (now Bač, Serbia) and Nagyvárad (present-day Oradea, Romania), respectively, during Ladislaus's reign.

=== Last years (1092–1095) ===
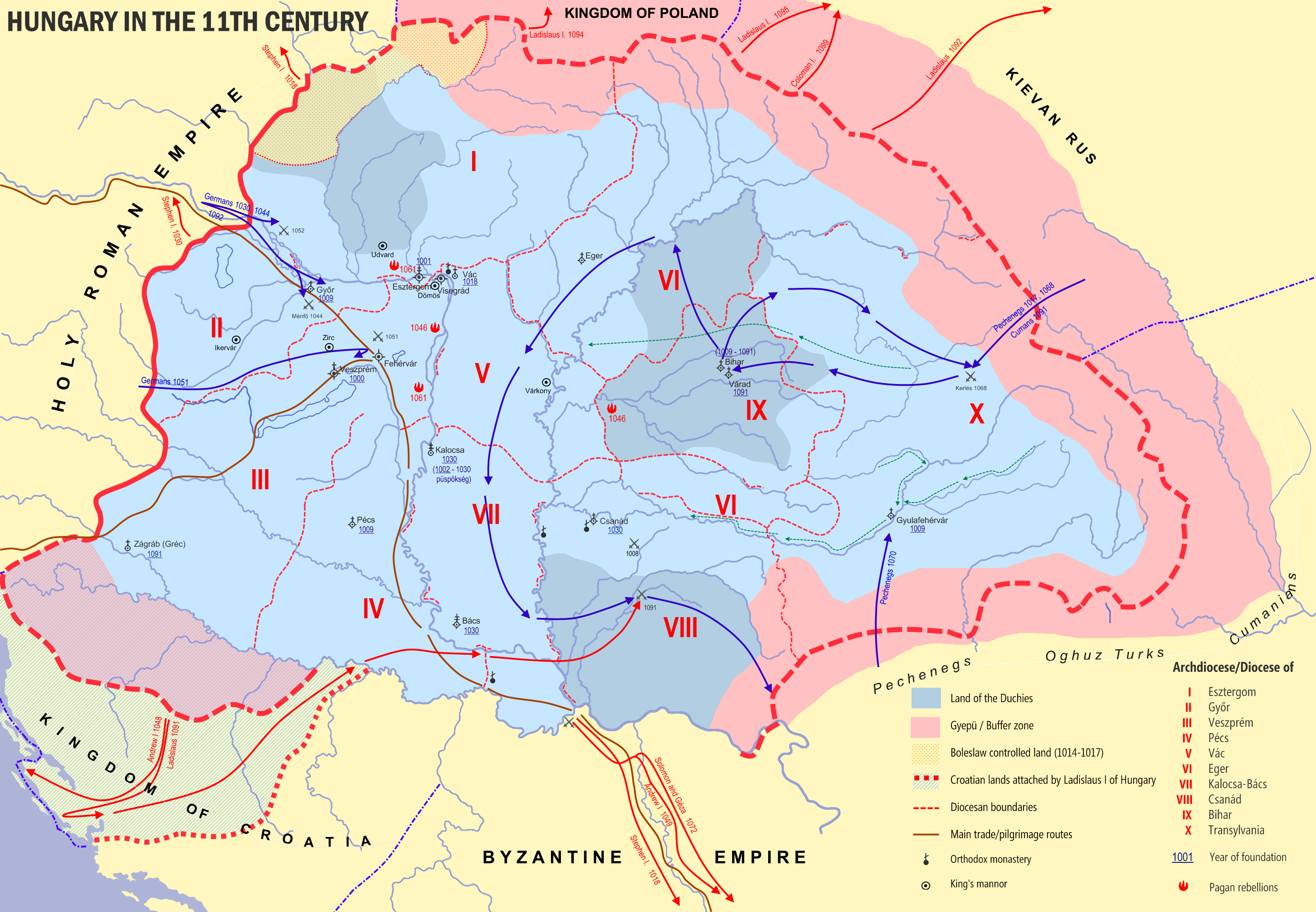
The Kingdom of Hungary in the 1090s

Ladislaus intervened in a conflict between Władysław I Herman, Duke of Poland, and the duke's illegitimate son, Zbigniew, on the latter's behalf. He marched to Poland and captured Herman's younger son, Boleslaus, in 1093. At Ladislaus's demand, Władysław I Herman declared Zbigniew his legitimate son. The Illuminated Chronicle also mentions that the Hungarian troops captured Kraków during Ladislaus's campaign, but the credibility of this report has been questioned.

The Illuminated Chronicle states that "messengers from France and from Spain, from England and Britain, and especially from Willermus, the brother of the King of the Franks" visited Ladislaus in Bodrog (near present-day Bački Monoštor in Serbia) on Easter 1095, asking him to lead their crusade to the Holy Land. Ladislaus's legend says that he decided "to go to Jerusalem, and to die there for Christ". The whole story was invented, probably during the reign of King Béla III of Hungary (who was actually planning to lead a crusade to the Holy Land in the 1190s), according to historian Gábor Klaniczay. However, Ladislaus did plan to invade Bohemia, because he wanted to assist his sister's sons, Svatopluk and Otto. He became seriously ill before reaching Moravia. The Illuminated Chronicle narrates that Ladislaus, who had no sons, "called together his chief men", telling them that his brother's younger son, Álmos, "should reign after him".

Ladislaus died near the Hungarian-Bohemian border on 29 July 1095. A papal bull of Pope Paschal II in 1106 states that Ladislaus's "venerable body rests" in Somogyvár Abbey, implying that Ladislaus had been buried in Somogyvár. On the other hand, Ladislaus's late 12th-century "Legend" provides that his attendants buried him in Székesfehérvár, but the cart carrying his body "set out to Várad on its own, unassisted by any draft animal".

== Family ==
Ancestors of Ladislaus I of Hungary

16. Taksony of Hungary
8. Michael
17. A "Cuman" lady
4. Vazul
2. Béla I of Hungary
5. A lady of the Tátony clan
1. Ladislaus I of Hungary
24. Mieszko I of Poland
12. Boleslaus I of Poland
25. Dobrawa of Bohemia
6. Mieszko II Lambert of Poland
26. Dobromir
13. Emnilda
3. Richeza or Adelaide of Poland
28. Herman I, Count Palatine of Lotharingia
14. Ezzo, Count Palatine of Lotharingia
29. Heylwig of Dillingen
7. Richeza of Lotharingia
30. Otto II, Holy Roman Emperor
15. Matilda of Germany
31. Theophanu

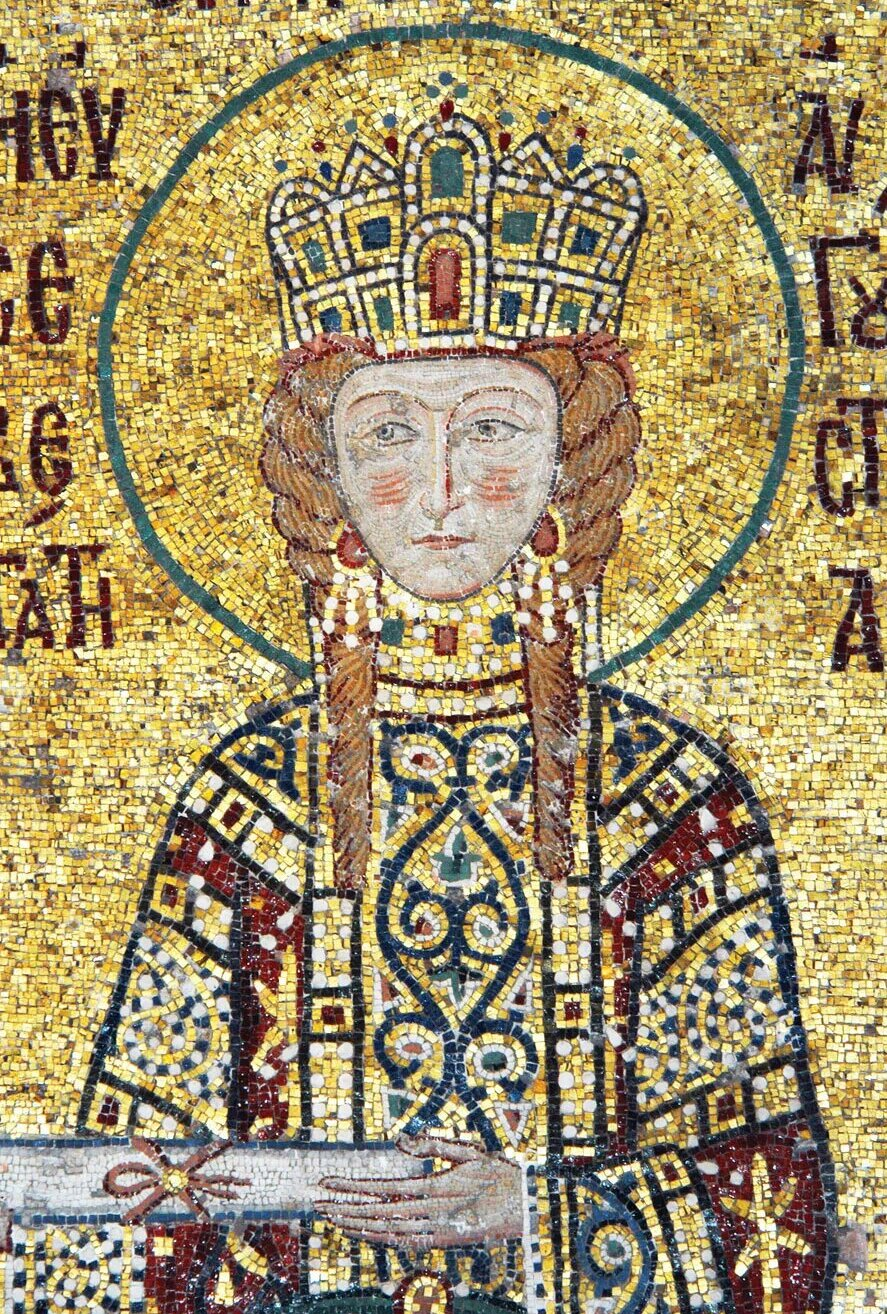
Mosaic portrait of Ladislaus's daughter, Piroska, who was known as Empress Irene in the Byzantine Empire, in the Hagia Sophia (Istanbul, Turkey). She is venerated as Saint Irene by the Eastern Orthodox Church.

Historian Gyula Kristó says that Ladislaus had a first wife, but her name and family are not known. She gave birth to a daughter, whose name is also unknown. Ladislaus's daughter married Prince Iaroslav Sviatopolchich of Volhinia around 1090. Ladislaus married again in 1078, to Adelaide, a daughter of the German anti-king Rudolf of Swabia. Their only known child, Piroska, became the wife of the Byzantine Emperor John II Komnenos in 1105 or 1106.

Ladislaus's family and relatives who are mentioned in the article are shown in the following family tree.

A lady of the Tátony clan	Vazul
Andrew I	Béla I	Richeza or Adelaide
Solomon
Géza I	unknown*	Ladislaus	Adelaide of Rheinfelden	Lampert	Helena	Zvonimir of Croatia
Kings of Hungary (from 1095)	Iaroslav of Volhinia	daughter	Irene (born Piroska)	John II Komnenos

*According to a scholarly theory suggesting that Ladislaus had two wives.

== Legacy ==
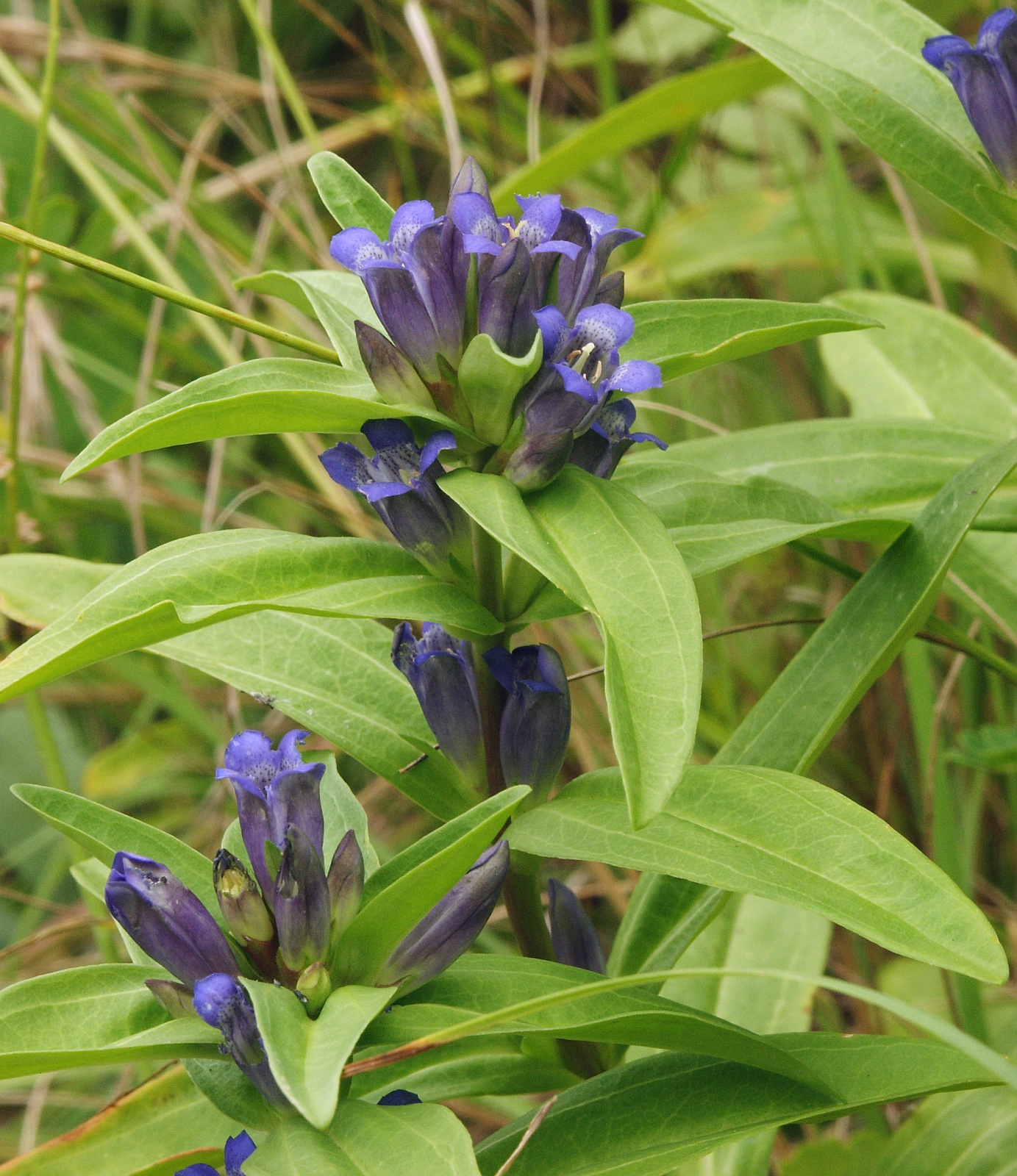
A blue-flowered Gentiana cruciata (Star Gentian), traditionally known in Hungary as "St. Ladislaus's Herb" (Hungarian: Szent László füve)

=== Consolidation of the Christian monarchy ===
For centuries, hagiographers and historians have emphasized Ladislaus's prominent role in the consolidation of the Christian monarchy. The chronicles also stressed his idoneitas, or personal suitability, to reign, because the legitimacy of his rule was questionable. The Illuminated Chronicle clearly states that Ladislaus knew that "the right of law between him and [Solomon] was not on his side but only the force of fact".

After Ladislaus's victories over the Pechenegs and the Cumans, the nomadic peoples of the Pontic steppes stopped invading Hungary until the Mongol invasion of 1241. Kristó suggests that the Székely people—a community of Hungarian-speaking warriors—started settling the easternmost borderlands under Ladislaus. The "historic association of the Kingdom of Hungary and Croatia", which ended in 1918, began with Ladislaus's conquest of Croatia. His conquest marked the beginning of a period of Hungarian expansion, which ensured that Hungary developed into a leading Central European power during the following centuries. It became a customary rite for a newly crowned Hungarian king to make a pilgrimage to Ladislaus's shrine at Várad. Louis I of Hungary, who made many attempts to expand his territory in the Balkan Peninsula, showed a special respect for Ladislaus.

Hungary had never had as great as king, so they repute
And the land thereafter never bore that much and splendid fruit.

— Gallus Anonymus: The Deeds of the Princes of the Poles

=== Sainthood and veneration ===
St. Ladislaus
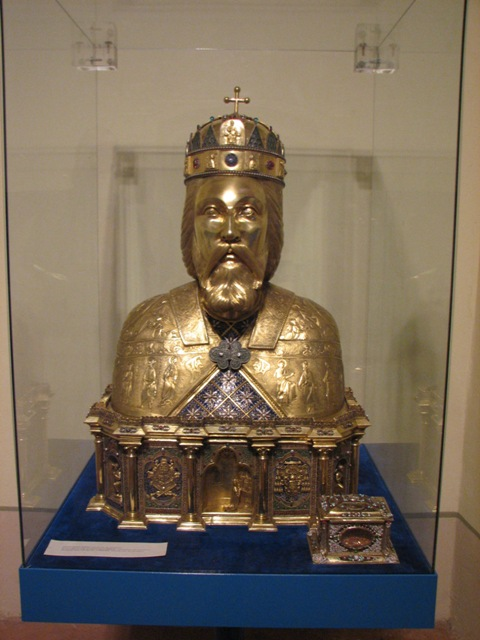
- Saint Ladislaus's reliquary of the late 19th-century (in the Cathedral-Basilica of Oradea, Romania)

King and Confessor
- Venerated in: Catholic Church
- Canonized: 27 June 1192 (dubious) by Pope Celestine III (dubious)
- Major shrine: Cathedral-Basilica of Oradea, Romania and Cathedral Basilica of Győr, Hungary
- Feast: 27 June
- Attributes: Long sword defended by two angels
- Patronage: Patron Saint of Hungary; Patron Saint of the Székelys; Protector against pestilence

Gábor Klaniczay emphasizes that Ladislaus "seemed expressly designed to personify the knight-king ideal" of his age. During the reign of Ladislaus's successor, Coloman the Learned, Bishop Hartvik said that Ladislaus's "character was distinguished by the respectability of morals and remarkable for the splendor of his virtues". The so-called Gesta Ladislai regis ("The Deeds of King Ladislaus"), which are the texts about Ladislaus's life and reign preserved in 14th-century Hungarian chronicles, were written during Coloman's rule. Five significant events of Ladislaus's life, which were not included in his official legend, were only preserved in the Gesta.

The most popular story describes Ladislaus's fight with a "Cuman" warrior after the Battle of Kerlés (at present-day Chiraleș, Romania) in 1068. In the battle, the united armies of Solomon, Géza and Ladislaus routed a band of Pechenegs or Oghuz Turks who were plundering the eastern parts of the kingdom. According to the version recorded in the Illuminated Chronicle, Ladislaus spotted a pagan warrior fleeing from the battlefield with a captive Hungarian maiden. Ladislaus pursued the "Cuman", but he could not stop him. On Ladislaus's advice, the maiden pulled the warrior off his horse, allowing Ladislaus to kill the "Cuman" after a long fight on the ground. Archaeologist Gyula László says that murals depicting this legend in medieval churches preserved the elements of pagan myths, including a "struggle between forces of light and darkness".

[The] most blessed Duke Ladislaus saw one of the pagans who was carrying off on his horse a beautiful Hungarian girl. The saintly Duke Ladislaus thought that it was the daughter of the Bishop of Warad, and although he was seriously wounded, he swiftly pursued him on his horse, which he called by the name of Zug. When he caught up with him and wished to spear him, he could not do so, for neither could his own horse go any faster nor did the other's horse yield any ground, but there remained the distance of a man's arm between his spear and the Coman's back. So the saintly Duke Ladislaus shouted to the girl and said: "Fair sister, take hold of the Coman by his belt and throw yourself to the ground." Which she did; and the saintly Duke Ladislaus was about to spear him as he lay upon the ground, for he wished to kill him. But the girl strongly pleaded with him not to kill him, but to let him go. Whence it is to be seen that there is no faith in women; for it was probably because of strong carnal love that she wished him to go free. But after having fought for a long time with him and unmanned him, the saintly Duke killed him. But the girl was not the bishop's daughter.

— The Hungarian Illuminated Chronicle

During the reign of Stephen II of Hungary, Ladislaus's shrine in the cathedral of Várad became a preferred venue for trials by ordeal. However, it cannot be determined whether Ladislaus became subject to veneration soon after his death, or if his cult emerged after he was canonized by Béla III of Hungary on 27 June 1192. Béla had lived at the Byzantine court, where Ladislaus's daughter, Empress Irene, was venerated as a saint.

According to Thomas the Archdeacon, Pope Innocent III declared that Ladislaus "should be enrolled in the catalogue of saints", but his report is unreliable, because Celestine III was pope at the time. Celestine III's bulls and charters make no reference to Ladislaus's canonization, implying that Ladislaus was canonized without the Holy See's authorization. The nearly contemporaneous Regestrum Varadinense says that a bondsman, named "Tekus, son of the craftsman Dénes", opened Ladislaus's tomb at the beginning of the ceremony, after which Tekus was granted freedom. Parts of Ladislaus's head and right hand were severed so that they could be distributed as relics. The 15th-century silver reliquary that contains Ladislaus's head is displayed in Győr Cathedral.

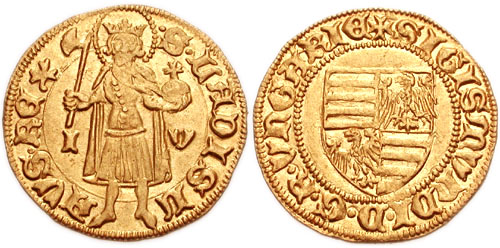
Gold coin of King Sigismund of Hungary depicting King Saint Ladislaus

Ladislaus's official legend, which was compiled after 1204, attributes a number of miracles to him. According to one of his legends, a pestilence spread throughout the kingdom during Ladislaus's reign. Ladislaus prayed for a cure; he then shot an arrow into the air at random, hitting a herb which cured the illness. This plant became known as "Saint Ladislaus's herb" in Hungary.

Ladislaus is a patron saint of Hungary, especially along the borders. In particular, soldiers and the Székely people venerate him. A late medieval legend says that Ladislaus appeared at the head of a Székely army fighting against and routing a plundering band of Tatars in 1345. He is also called upon during times of pestilence. He is often depicted as a mature, bearded man wearing a royal crown and holding a long sword or banner. He is also shown on his knees before a deer, or in the company of two angels.

King Sigismund of Hungary died in 1437, and as ordered in life, he was buried at Várad (now Oradea), next to the tomb of the King Saint Ladislaus, who was the ideal of the perfect monarch, warrior and Christian for that time and was deeply venerated by Sigismund.

== Herma of King Saint Ladislaus and genetics ==
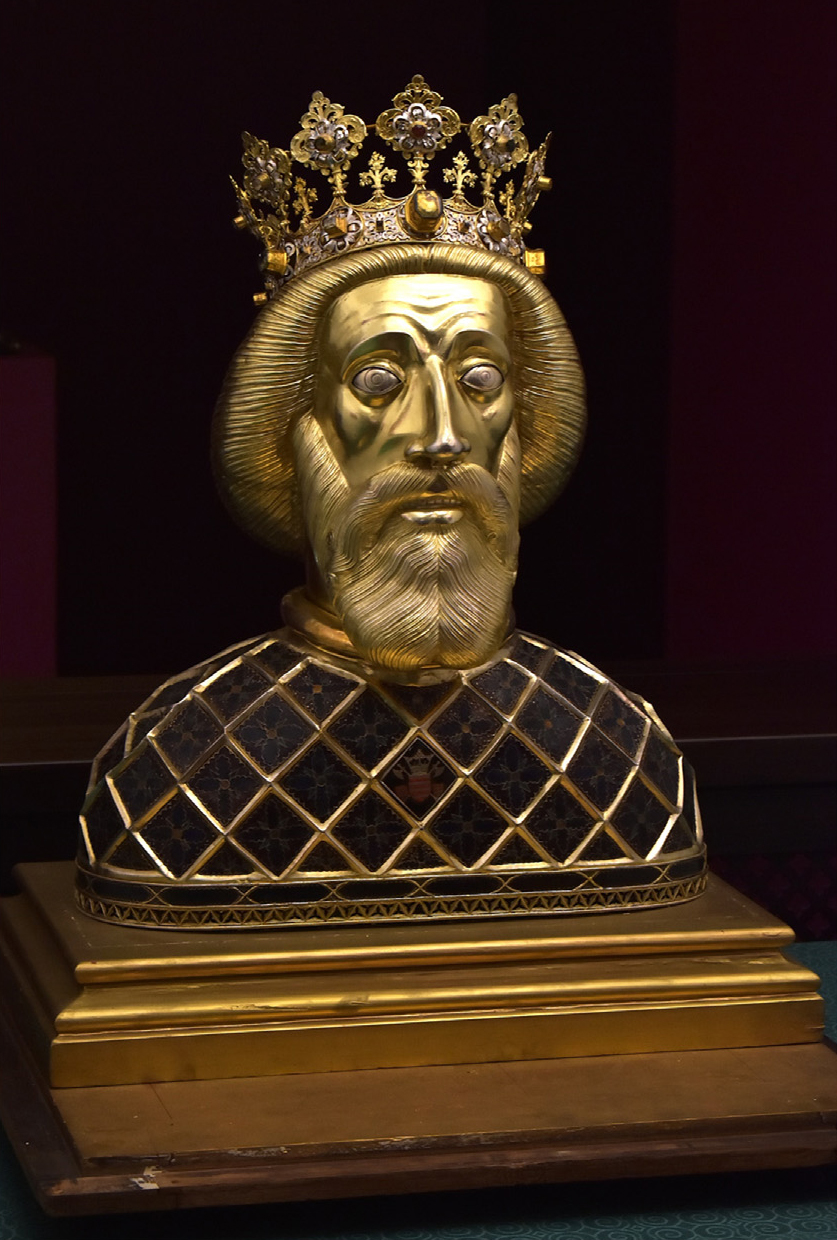
Herm of King Saint Ladislaus (15th century) containing his skull, held in the Cathedral Basilica of Győr

The skull relic in Saint Ladislaus's Herma, preserved in the Cathedral Basilica of Győr, is one of the most important relics for Hungarians.

King Saint Ladislaus of Hungary completed the work of King Saint Stephen of Hungary, consolidating Hungarian state power and strengthening Christianity in Hungary. His charismatic personality, strategic leadership and military talents resulted the termination of internal power struggles and foreign military threats. He was seen as the embodiment of the knight-king ideal to be emulated all over Europe. He was canonized in 1192 at the request of King Béla III of Hungary, and his body was exhumed to prepare relics from his skull and other skeletal remains as was the custom in that medieval times.

According to historian György Szabados, Gyula László proved in 1965 that the face of Saint Ladislaus's Herma depicts King Béla III. The skull reconstruction of the Royal Basilica's tomb find in Székesfehérvár also shows the face of the Herma, which is not surprising, because King Ladislaus had already been dead for 97 years in 1192, so only the then-living king from the same family, Béla III, was worthy to sit as a model for the creation of the face of the Herma.

The wooden herm containing the skull was damaged in a fire in 1406, but miraculously the skull has been preserved unharmed. Later it was placed into the current Herma created during the reign of King Sigismund of Hungary. In the 16th century, the relic had to be rescued from Várad due to the ravage of Transylvania by the Protestants. In the first decades of the 17th century, it reached its current location in the Cathedral of Győr after passing through Prague, Pozsony (now Bratislava) and Veszprém.

The turbulent history events of the Herma raised doubts concerning the authenticity of the relic by historians and archaeologists. At that time, the only Árpád dynasty king, the remains of King Béla III had known and identified, because little earlier, the Institute of Hungarian Research determinated the whole genome data of King Béla III which was published in 2020. Thus the Hungarian scholars were able to compare the paternal Y chromosome sequence of the skull to that of King Béla III from whom a whole genome data was available.

On 4 June 2021, Endre Neparáczki collected a sample from the skull of the herm. The Institute of Hungarian Research defined the genetic composition of the skull found in the herm and it was published in 2023. The result supported the originality of Saint Ladislaus relic, the Y chromosome of the skull belongs to the exclusive haplogroup of the Árpád-dynasty R-ARP (R1a1a1b2a2a1c3a3b) and the kinship analysis detected the skull is at five generations distance from King Béla III.

The R-ARP sub-haplogroup belongs to the R-Z2123 clade, the phylogenetic analysis suggested a Bronze Age BMAC origin of the R-Z2123 sub-haplogroup which belongs to the R-Z2125 clade, which was detected in individuals from the Middle-Late Bronze Age on the Caspian Steppe, connected to the Potapovka, Sintashta and Andronovo cultures. In the Iron Age, this haplogroup was detected in the Turan basin and in Scytho-Siberians of the Minusinsk Basin, later among the Asian Huns (Xiongnus) and up until the Middle Ages in Mongolia which indicates an eastward and southward spread of the haplogroup. The first appearance of R-Z2125 in the Carpathian Basin was detected in 5th-century European Huns, and 7th–8th-century Avars, but it also arrived with the conquering Hungarians, in the 9th–10th century including Árpád and his family. The basic premise of the Hungarian medieval chronicle tradition (for example in the Chronicon Pictum) that the Huns, i.e. the Hungarians coming out twice from Scythia, the guiding principle was the Hun-Hungarian continuity. The genomic analyses of the Hungarian royal Árpád family members are in line with the reported conquering Hungarian-Hun origin of the dynasty in harmony with their Y-chromosomal phylogenetic connections.

The Institute of Hungarian Research published a genetic study in 2022 in which 113 Hungarian conqueror samples were analyzed. The results of the genome analysis of King Saint Ladislaus confirmed that the Árpád dynasty originated from the same ethnic group as other members of the Hungarian conqueror elite (i.e. from semi-nomadic tribes originating in central and east Asia), and that he had higher genetic affinity to these Hungarian conquerors than later Hungarian royalty that succeeded him. King Saint Ladislaus had more Eastern genomic heritage than his later relatives, on the PCA genetic map he shifted slightly eastward from the cloud of modern European populations, while the genome of King Béla III was projected near modern Hungarians and Croatians, because the Central Asian genomes were progressively attenuated during the centuries through dynastic marriages with European royal families.

Saint Ladislaus became the first saint in the world whose identity was confirmed by archaeogenetic tests.

== Gallery ==
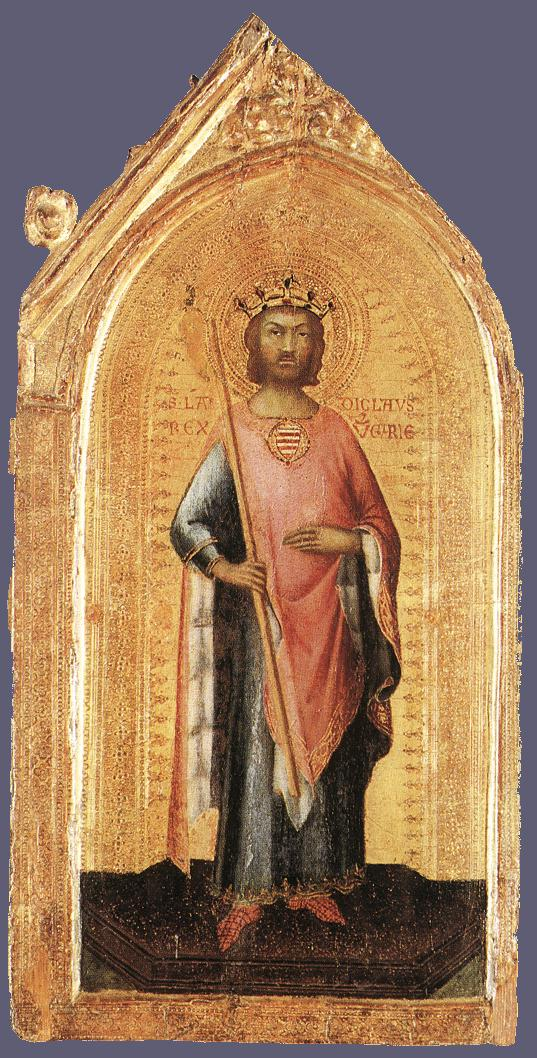
Saint Ladislaus (painting by Simone Martini, 1326) (Museo Civico di Santa Maria della Consolazione, Altomonte, Italy)

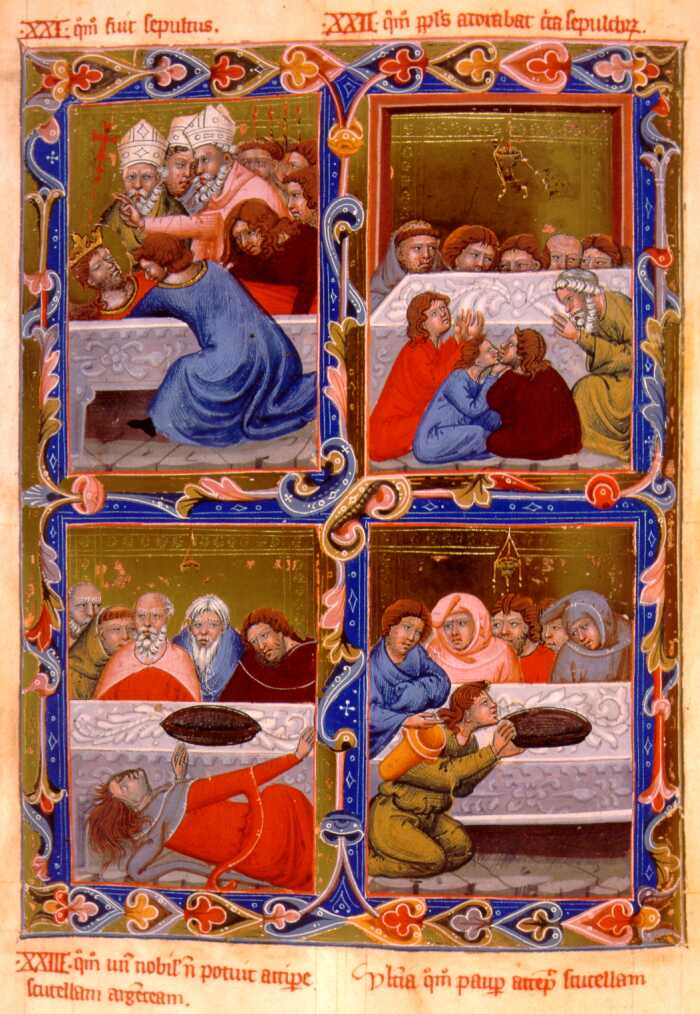
1. Burial of Saint Ladislaus. 2. Persons praying at his tomb. 3. A rich man unable to lift a silver tray from his tomb. 4. A poor man lifting the silver tray. (Anjou Legendarium, 14th century)

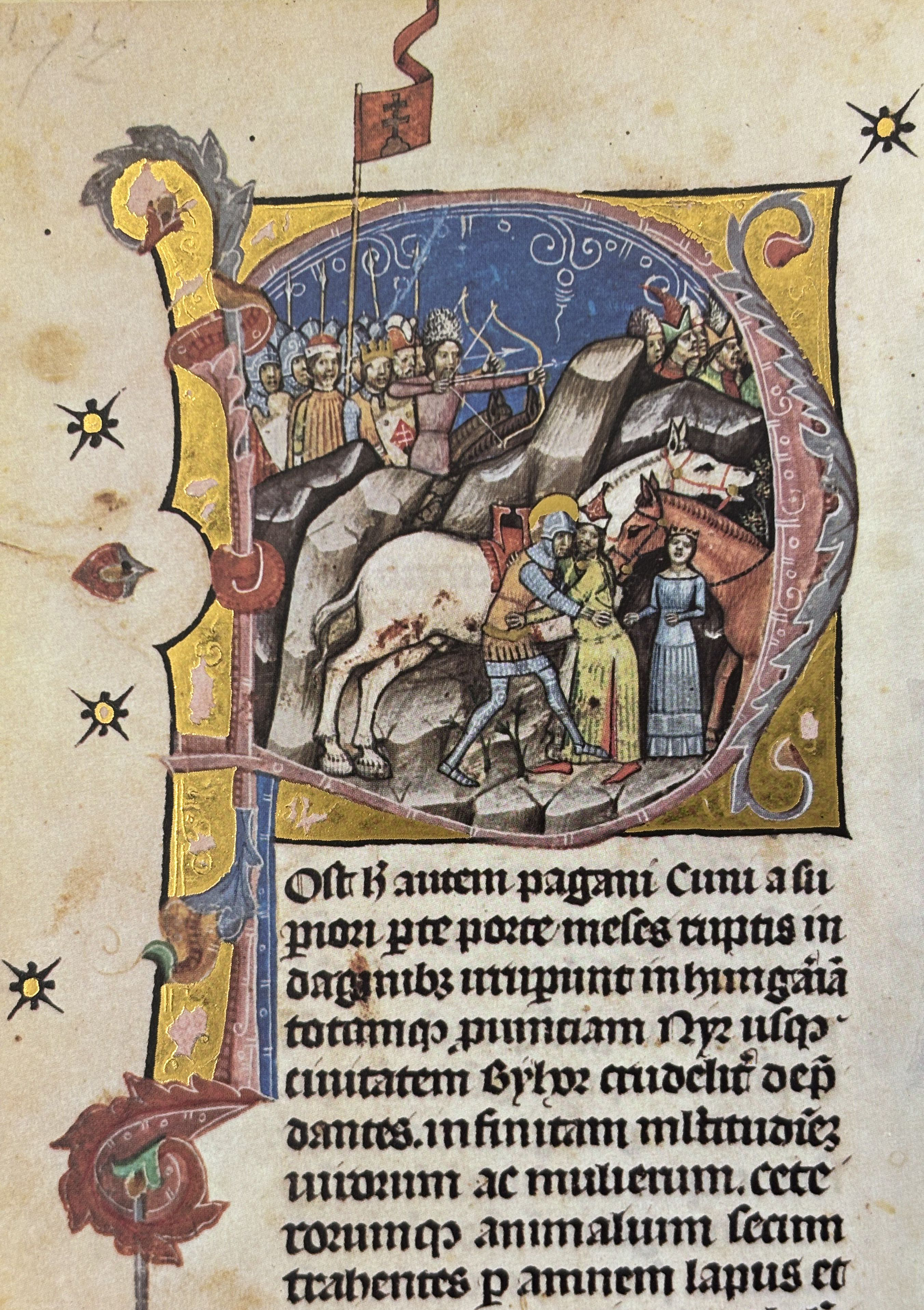
In the initial "P", Prince Ladislaus is fighting a duel with a Cuman warrior (Chronicon Pictum, 1358)

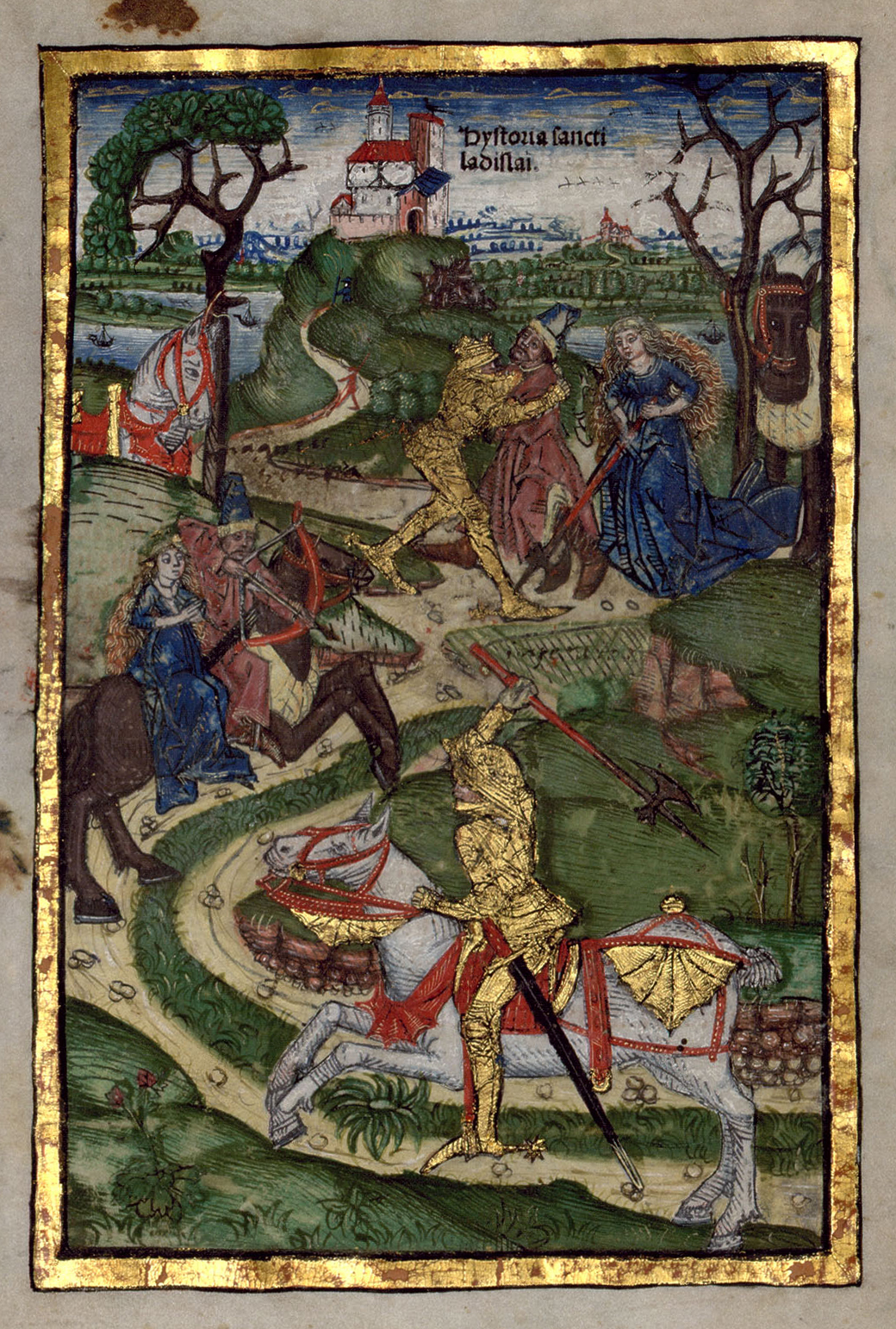
Saint Ladislaus chases the Cuman warrior who kidnapped a girl (Chronica Hungarorum, 1488)

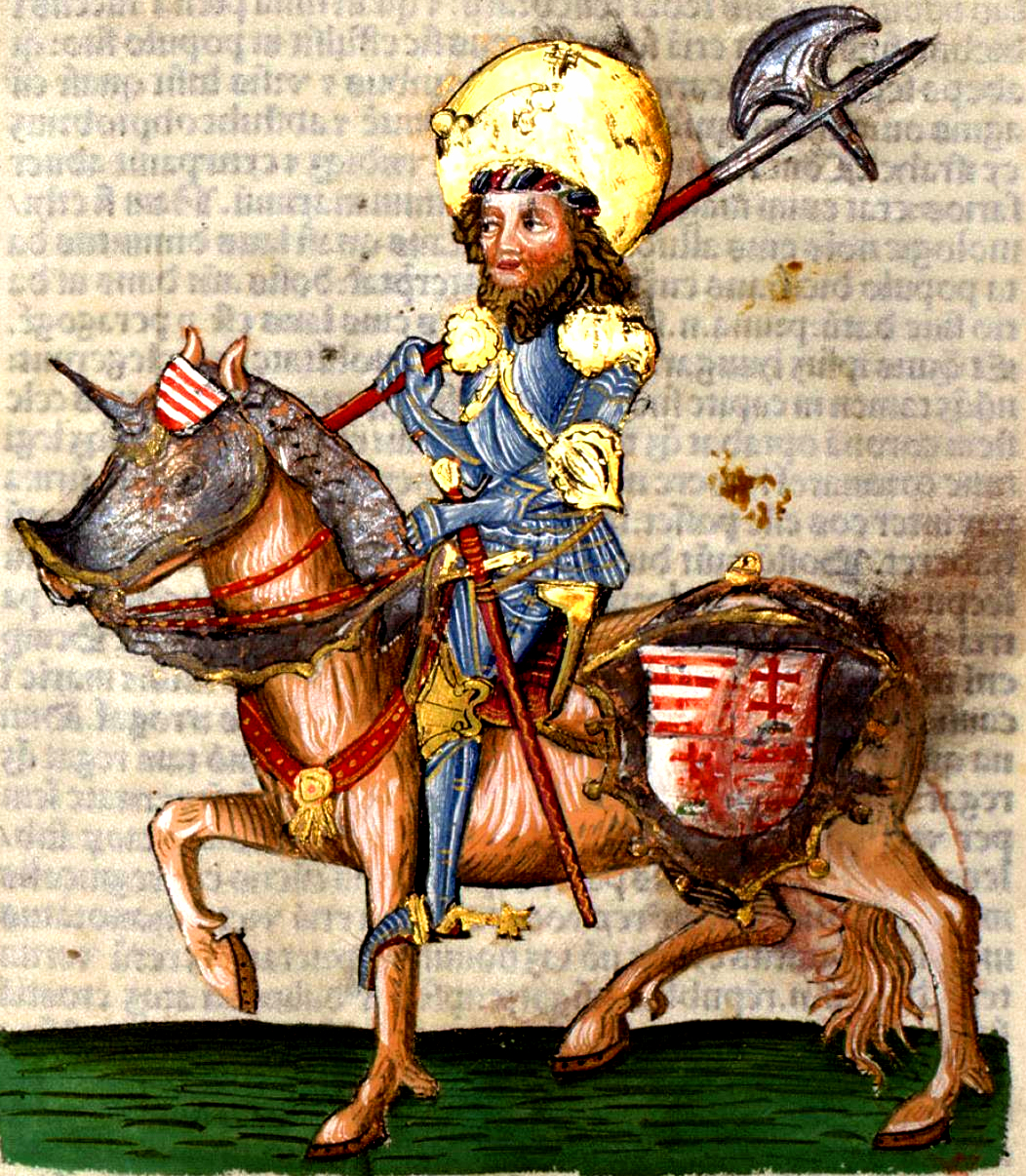
Saint Ladislaus the knight-king (Chronica Hungarorum, 1488)

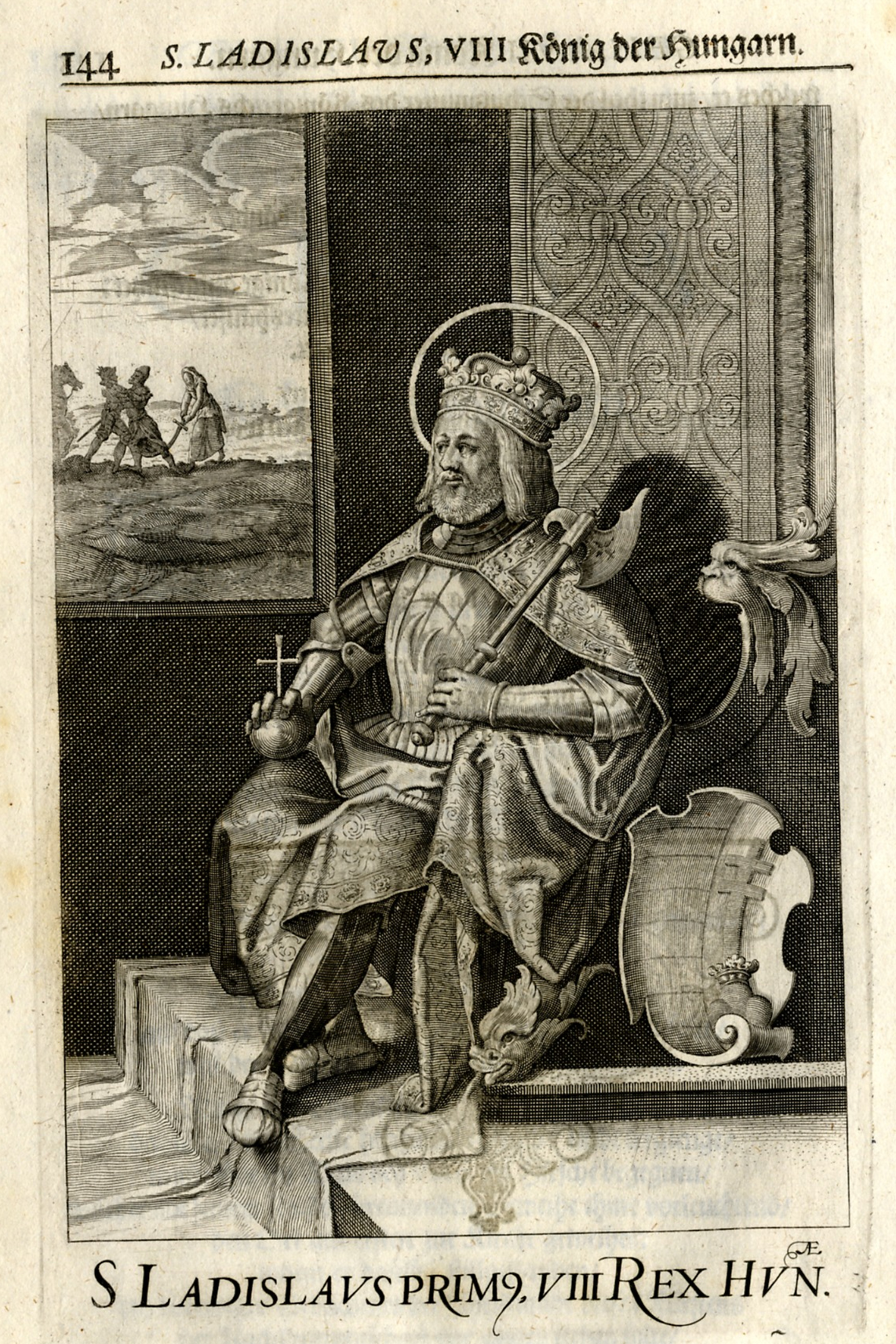
King Saint Ladislaus (Nádasdy Mausoleum, 1664)

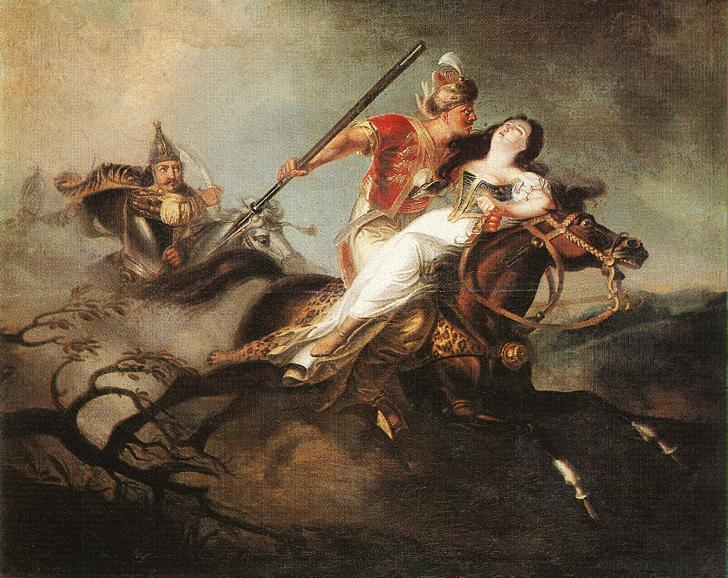
Saint Ladislaus at Battle of Cserhalom (painting by Károly Kisfaludy, 1826–1830) (Hungarian National Gallery, Budapest)

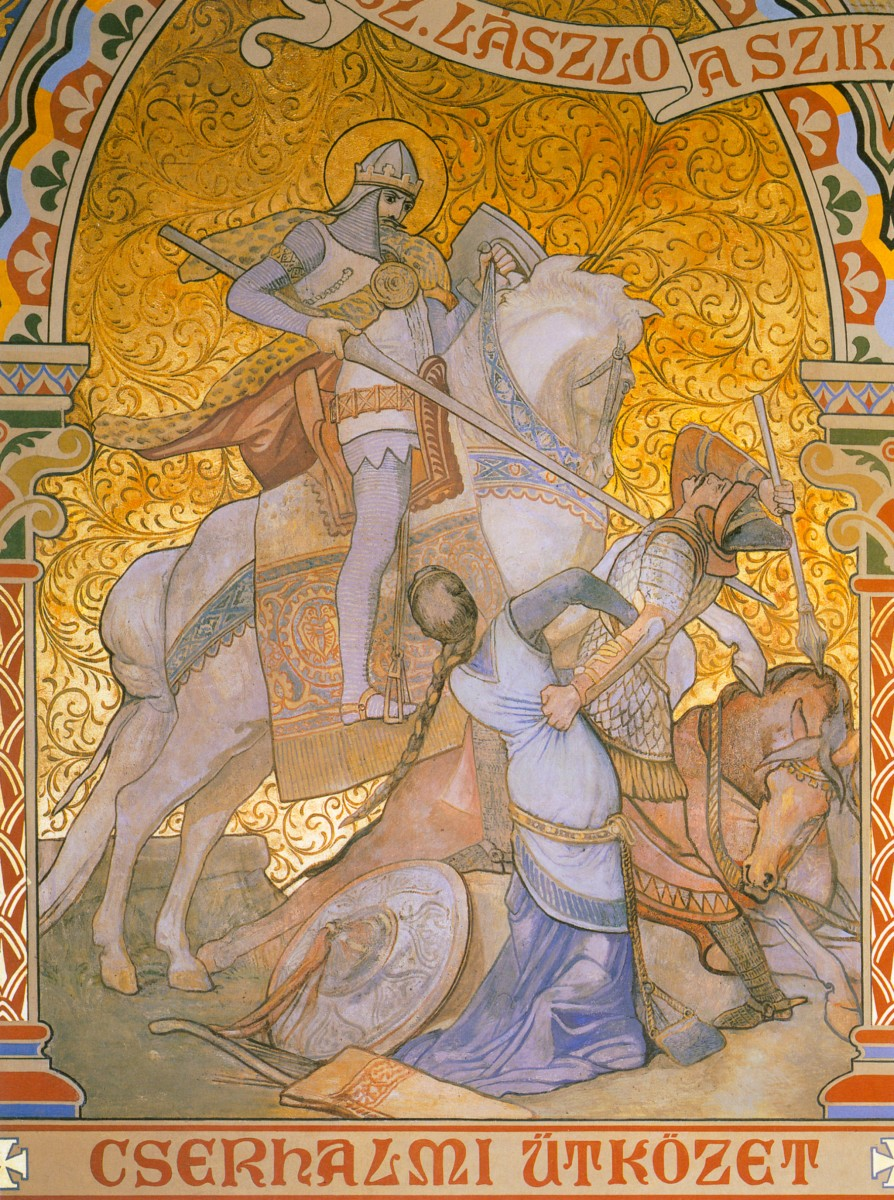
The depiction of the Battle of Cserhalom in the Saint Ladislaus chapel, Matthias Church (Budapest, Hungary) (painting by Károly Lotz, 19th century). King Saint Ladislaus of Hungary saves the kidnapped Hungarian girl from a Cuman warrior.

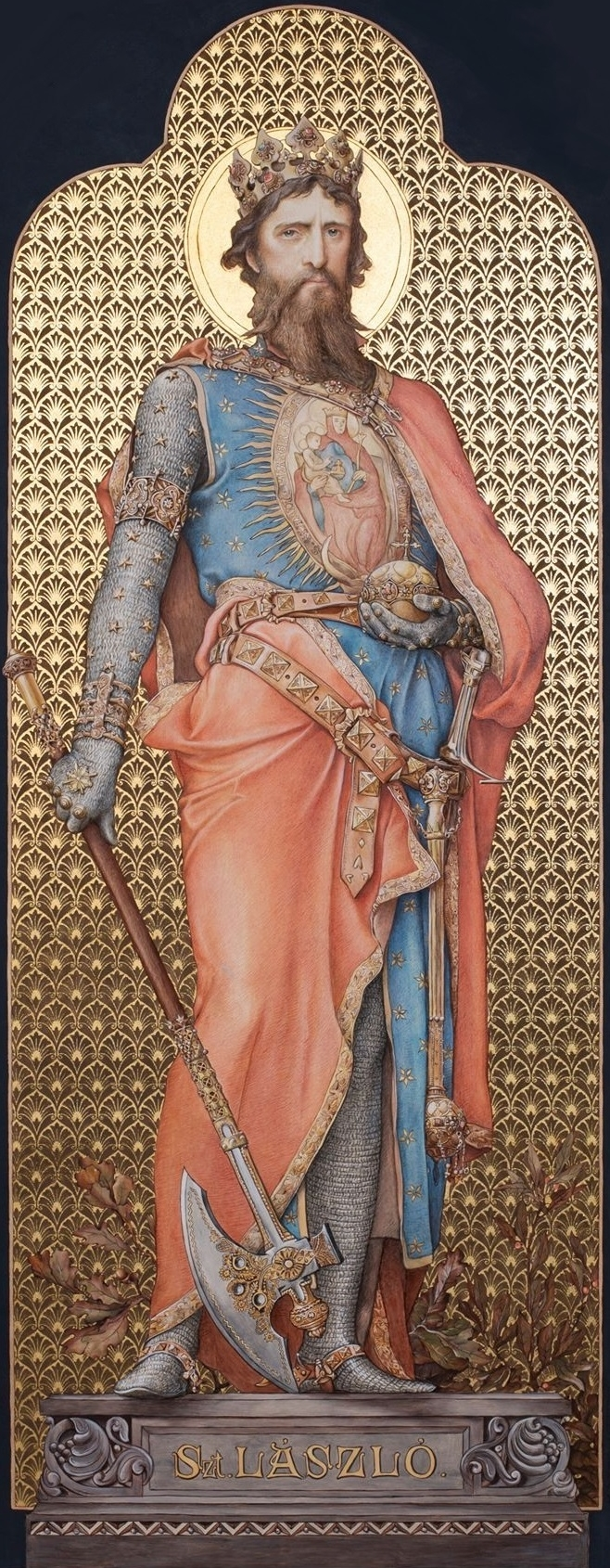
Saint Ladislaus in the Saint Stephen room in the Buda Castle

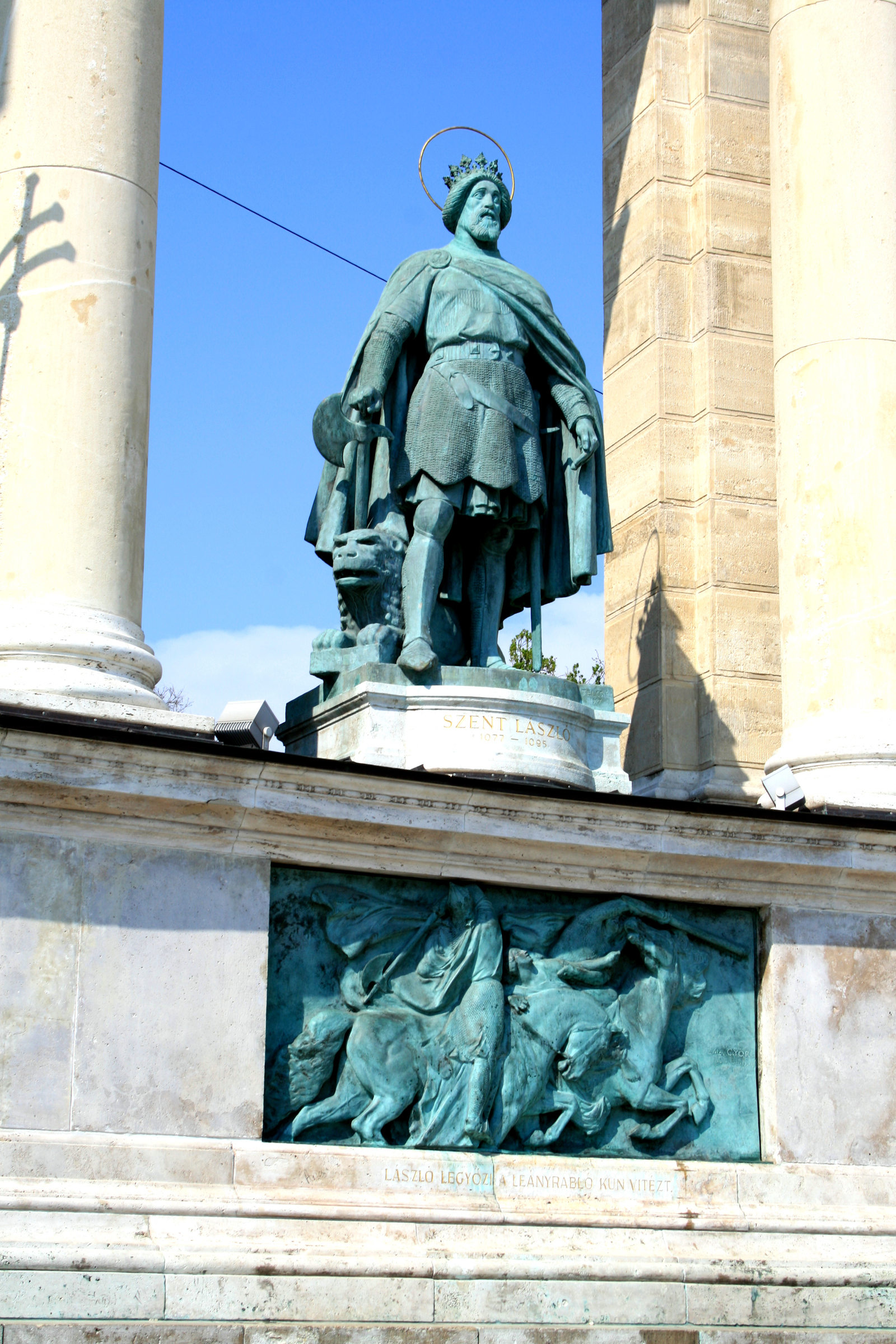
Statue of Saint Ladislaus at the Heroes' Square, Budapest

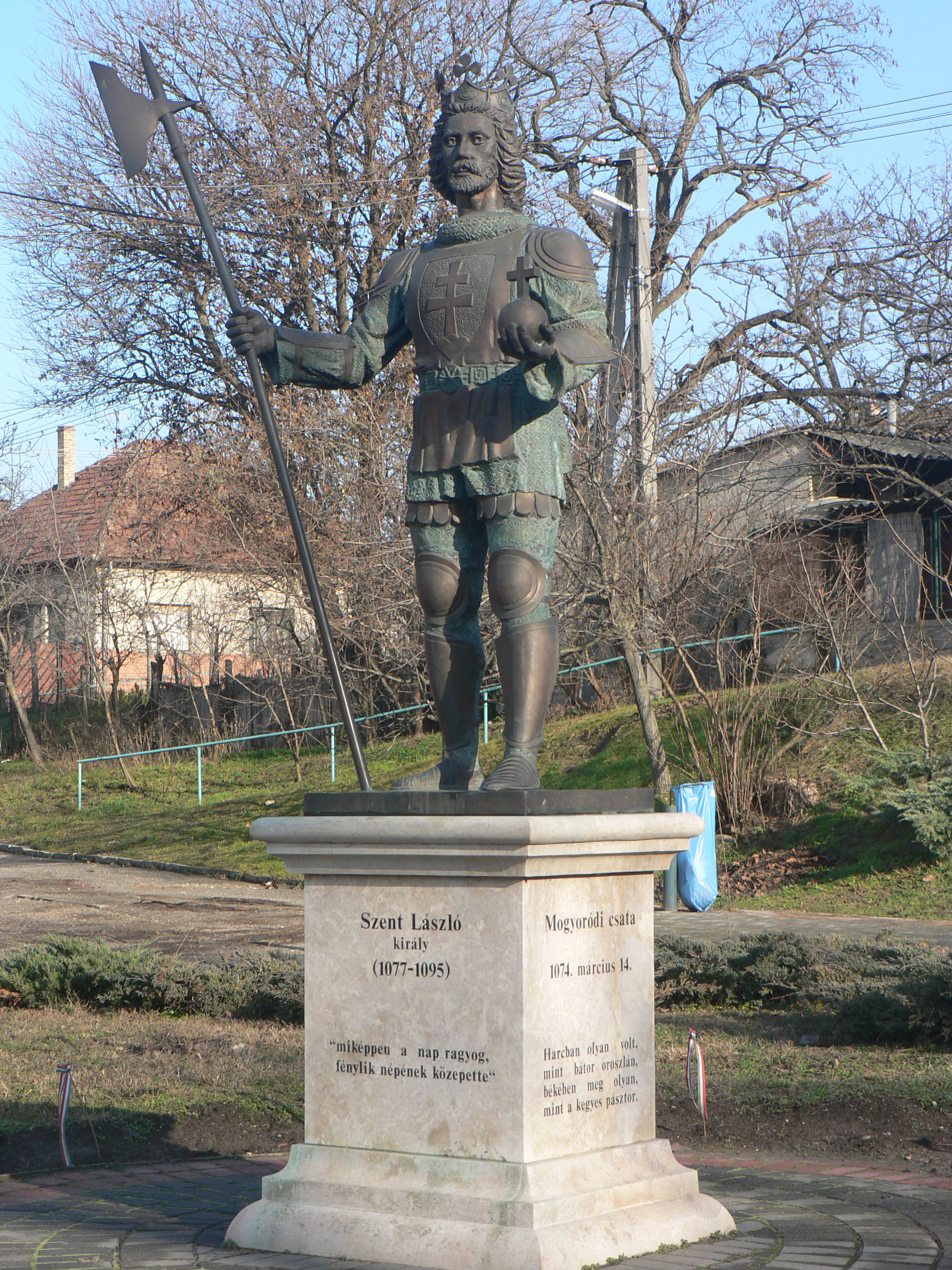
Statue of Saint Ladislaus made to memory of the Battle of Mogyoród in Mogyoród, Hungary (made by Lajos Józsa in 2001)

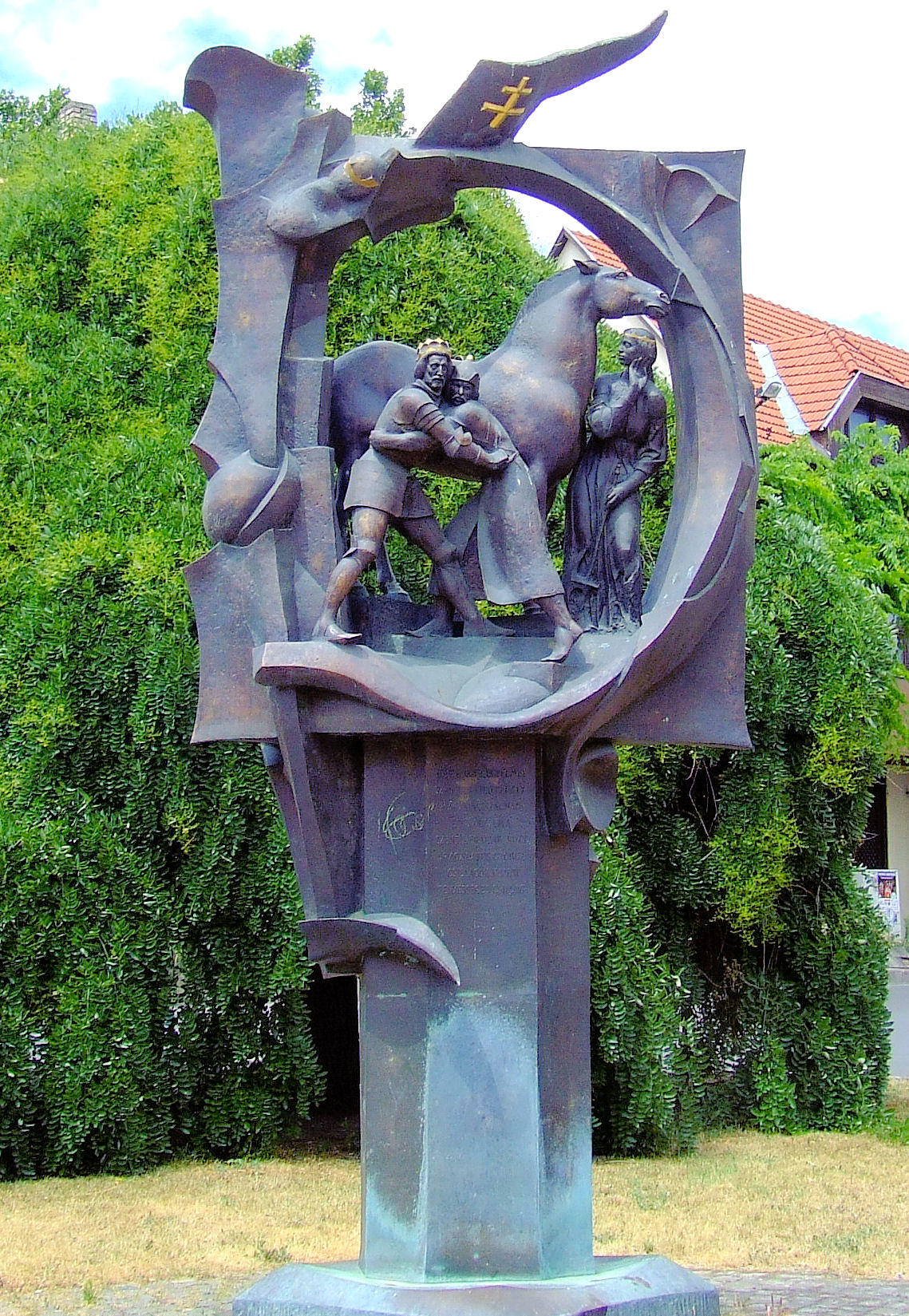
Statue of Saint Ladislaus in Szekszárd, Hungary (made by Benedek Nagy in 2001). The composition was based on the Ladislaus and Cuman warrior duel scene in the initial "P" in the Chronicon Pictum.

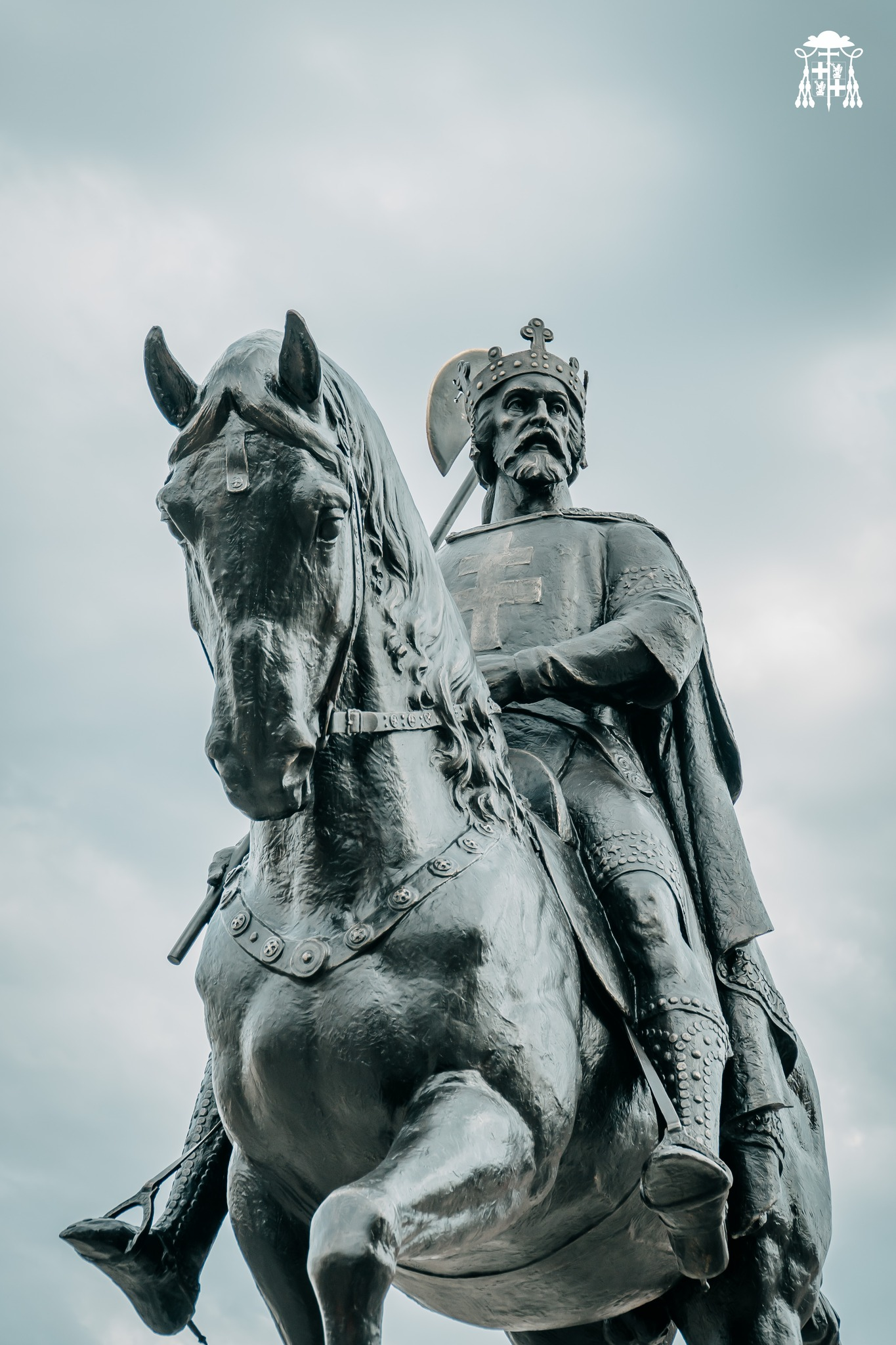
Horse statue of Saint Ladislaus in the Roman Catholic Diocese of Oradea, Romania (made by Árpád Deák in 2023)

== See also ==
- Szent László Infantry Division
- Isten, hazánkért térdelünk
- New England (medieval)

== Sources ==
=== Primary sources ===
- "Bernold of St Blasien, Chronicle" (2008). In Robinson, I. S. Eleventh-Century Germany: The Swabian Chronicles. Manchester University Press. pp. 245–337. ISBN 978-0-7190-7734-0.
- "Hartvic, Life of King Stephen of Hungary" (Translated by Nora Berend) (2001). In Head, Thomas. Medieval Hagiography: An Anthology. Routledge. pp. 378–398. ISBN 0-415-93753-1.
- "The letters of Henry IV: Henry thanks Duke Almus for his support and promises him a reward" (2000). In Imperial Lives & Letters of the Eleventh Century (Translated by Theodor E. Mommsen and Karl F. Morrison, with a historical introduction and new suggested readings by Karl F. Morrison, edited by Robert L. Benson). Columbia University Press. pp. 52–100. ISBN 978-0-231-12121-7.
- The Deeds of the Princes of the Poles (Translated and annotated by Paul W. Knoll and Frank Schaer with a preface by Thomas N. Bisson) (2003). CEU Press. ISBN 963-9241-40-7.
- The Hungarian Illuminated Chronicle: Chronica de Gestis Hungarorum (Edited by Dezső Dercsényi) (1970). Corvina, Taplinger Publishing. ISBN 0-8008-4015-1.
- "The Laws of King Ladislas I (1077–1095)". In The Laws of the Medieval Kingdom of Hungary, 1000–1301 (Translated and Edited by János M. Bak, György Bónis, James Ross Sweeney with an essay on previous editions by Andor Czizmadia, Second revised edition, In collaboration with Leslie S. Domonkos) (1999). Charles Schlacks Jr. Publishers. pp. 11–22. ISBN 1-884445-29-2. OCLC 495379882. OCLC 248424393. LCCN 89-10492. OL 12153527M. (ISBN may be misprinted in the book as 88445-29-2).
- Archdeacon Thomas of Split: History of the Bishops of Salona and Split (Latin text by Olga Perić, edited, translated and annotated by Damir Karbić, Mirjana Matijević Sokol and James Ross Sweeney) (2006). CEU Press. ISBN 963-7326-59-6.

=== Secondary sources ===
- Bárány, Attila (2012). "The Expansion of the Kingdom of Hungary in the Middle Ages (1000–1490)". In Berend, Nóra (ed.). The Expansion of Central Europe in the Middle Ages. Ashgate Variorum. pp. 333–380. ISBN 978-1-4094-2245-7.
- Bartl, Július; Čičaj, Viliam; Kohútova, Mária; Letz, Róbert; Segeš, Vladimír; Škvarna, Dušan (2002). Slovak History: Chronology & Lexicon. Bolchazy-Carducci Publishers, Slovenské Pedegogické Nakladatel'stvo. ISBN 0-86516-444-4.
- Cartledge, Bryan (2011). The Will to Survive: A History of Hungary. C. Hurst & Co. ISBN 978-1-84904-112-6.
- Curta, Florin (2006). Southeastern Europe in the Middle Ages, 500–1250. Cambridge University Press. ISBN 978-0-521-89452-4.
- Engel, Pál (2001). The Realm of St Stephen: A History of Medieval Hungary, 895–1526. I.B. Tauris Publishers. ISBN 1-86064-061-3.
- Érszegi, Géza; Solymosi, László (1981). "Az Árpádok királysága, 1000–1301 [The Monarchy of the Árpáds, 1000–1301]". In Solymosi, László (ed.). Magyarország történeti kronológiája, I: a kezdetektől 1526-ig [Historical Chronology of Hungary, Volume I: From the Beginning to 1526] (in Hungarian). Akadémiai Kiadó. pp. 79–187. ISBN 963-05-2661-1.
- Ferdinandy, Mihály (2000). III. Ottó, a szent császár [Otto III, the Holy Emperor] (in Hungarian). Balassi Kiadó. ISBN 963-506-336-9.
- Fine, John V. A. Jr. (1991) [1983]. The Early Medieval Balkans: A Critical Survey from the Sixth to the Late Twelfth Century. Ann Arbor: University of Michigan Press. ISBN 0-472-08149-7.
- Font, Márta (2001). Koloman the Learned, King of Hungary (Supervised by Gyula Kristó, Translated by Monika Miklán). Márta Font (supported by the Publication Commission of the Faculty of Humanities of the University of Pécs). ISBN 963-482-521-4.
- Klaniczay, Gábor (2002). Holy Rulers and Blessed Princes: Dynastic Cults in Medieval Central Europe. Cambridge University Press. ISBN 0-521-42018-0.
- Kontler, László (1999). Millennium in Central Europe: A History of Hungary. Atlantisz Publishing House. ISBN 963-9165-37-9.
- Kosztolnyik, Z. J. (1981). Five Eleventh Century Hungarian Kings: Their Policies and their Relations with Rome. Boulder. ISBN 0-914710-73-7.
- Kristó, Gyula; Makk, Ferenc (1996). Az Árpád-ház uralkodói [Rulers of the House of Árpád] (in Hungarian). I.P.C. Könyvek. ISBN 963-7930-97-3.
- Lanzi, Fernando; Lanzi, Gioia (2004). Saints and Their Symbols: Recognizing Saints in Art and in Popular Images. Order of Saint Benedict. ISBN 0-8146-2970-9.
- László, Gyula (1996). The Magyars: Their Life and Civilisation. Corvina. ISBN 963-13-4226-3.
- Madgearu, Alexandru (2013). Byzantine Military Organization on the Danube, 10th–12th Centuries. Brill. ISBN 978-90-04-21243-5.
- Magaš, Branka (2007). Croatia Through History. SAQI. ISBN 978-0-86356-775-9.
- Makk, Ferenc (1994). "I. (Szt.) László". In Kristó, Gyula; Engel, Pál; Makk, Ferenc (eds.). Korai magyar történeti lexikon (9–14. század) [Encyclopedia of the Early Hungarian History (9th–14th centuries)] (in Hungarian). Akadémiai Kiadó. pp. 394–396. ISBN 963-05-6722-9.
- Makk, Ferenc; Thoroczkay, Gábor (2006). Írott források az 1050–1116 közötti magyar történelemről [Written Sources of the Hungarian History between 1050 and 1116] (in Hungarian). Szegedi Középkorász Műhely. ISBN 978-963-482-794-8.
- Manteuffel, Tadeusz (1982). The Formation of the Polish State: The Period of Ducal Rule, 963–1194 (Translated and with an Introduction by Andrew Gorski). Wayne State University Press. ISBN 0-8143-1682-4.
- Robinson, I. S. (1999). Henry IV of Germany, 1056–1106. Cambridge University Press. ISBN 0-521-54590-0.
- Steinhübel, Ján (2011). "The Duchy of Nitra". In Teich, Mikuláš; Kováč, Dušan; Brown, Martin D. (eds.). Slovakia in History. Cambridge University Press. pp. 15–29. ISBN 978-0-521-80253-6.
- Wiszewski, Przemysław (2010). Domus Bolezlai: Values and Social Identity in Dynastic Traditions of Medieval Poland (c. 966–1138). Brill. ISBN 978-90-04-18142-7.

Ladislaus I of Hungary House of Árpád Born: c. 1040 Died: 29 July 1095
Regnal titles
Preceded by Géza I	King of Hungary; 1077–1095	Succeeded by Coloman
Preceded by Stephen II	King of Croatia; 1091–1095	Succeeded by Petar Snačić
