= Gyula László =

Hungarian historian (1910–1998)

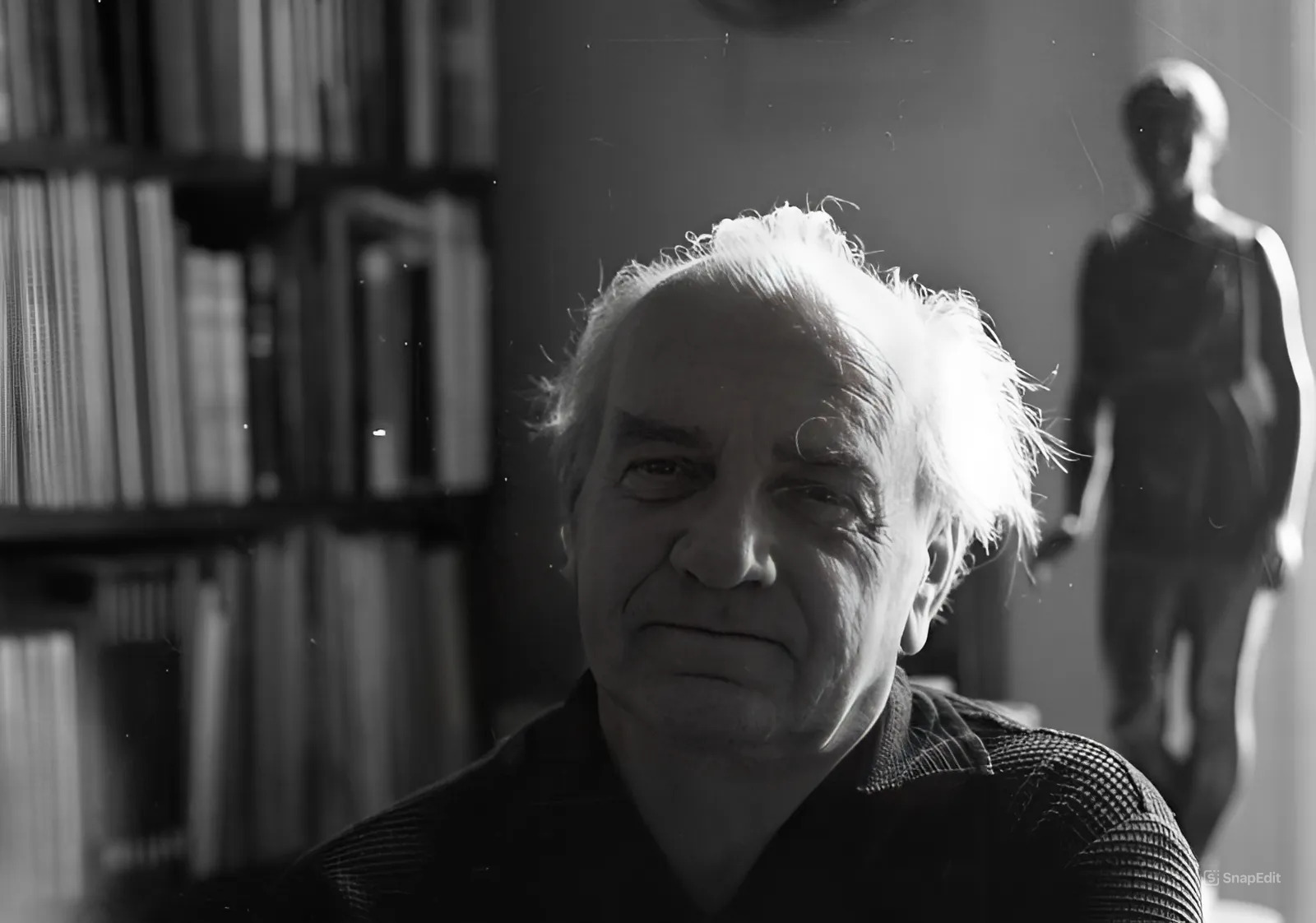
- Gyula László
- Born: March 14, 1910; Kőhalom, Kingdom of Hungary (today Rupea, Romania)
- Died: June 17, 1998 (aged 88); Oradea, Romania
- Occupation: Professor
- Known for: Theory on Hungarian "double conquest"

Gyula László (14 March 1910 – 17 June 1998) was a Hungarian historian, archaeologist and artist.

His main work is the novel theory of "double conquest" of the Carpathian Basin by Hungarians in 5th and 9th century. The essence of the theory is that (Pannonian) Avar culture is similar, or sometimes identical to Hungarian culture, so the conquest in circa 895, confirmed by all historians, must have been essentially a second entrance that followed an earlier, broader, less well documented, Avar invasion. This attempts to reconcile Hungarian chronicles, such as Chronicon Pictum with external chronicles mentioning invasions of Pannonian Avars.

== Gyula László's Avar-Hungarian continuity theory ==
Gyula László suggests that late Avars, arriving to the khaganate in 670 in great numbers, lived through the time between the destruction and plunder of the Avar state by the Franks during 791–795 and the arrival of the Magyars in 895. László points out that the settlements of the Hungarians (Magyars) complemented, rather than replaced, those of the Avars. Avars remained on the plough fields, good for agriculture, while Hungarians took the river banks and river flats, suitable for pasturage. He also notes that while the Hungarian graveyards consist of 40–50 graves on average, those of the Avars contain 600–1000. According to these findings, the Avars not only survived the end of the Avar polity but lived in great masses and far outnumbered the Hungarian conquerors of Árpád. He also shows that Hungarians occupied only the centre of the Carpathian basin, but Avars lived in a larger territory. Looking at those territories where only the Avars lived, one only finds Hungarian geographical names, not Slavic or Turkic as would be expected interspersed among them. This is further evidence for the Avar-Hungarian continuity. Names of the Hungarian tribes, chieftains and the words used for the leaders, etc., suggest that at least the leaders of the Hungarian conquerors were Turkic-speaking. However, Hungarian is not a Turkic language, rather Finno-Ugric, and so they must have been assimilated by the Avars that outnumbered them. László's Avar-Hungarian continuity theory also claims that the modern Hungarian language descends from that spoken by the Avars rather than the conquering Magyars.
