= Knínice (Blansko District) =

- Market town
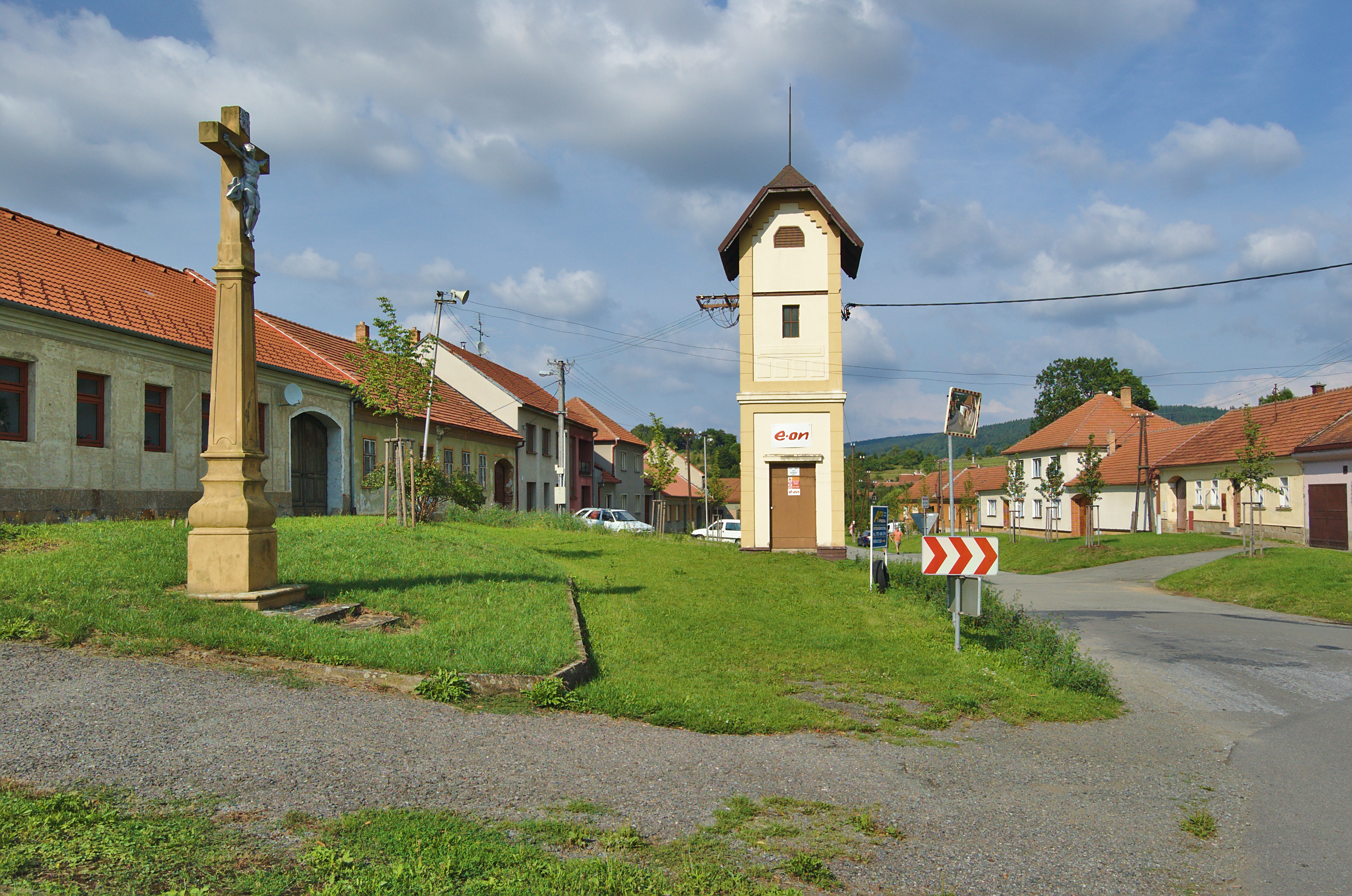
- Centre of Knínice

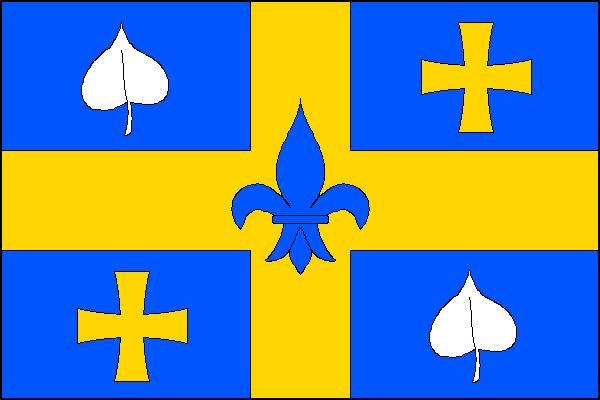
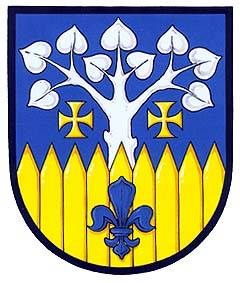
- Flag Coat of arms

- Location in the Czech Republic
- Coordinates: 49°32′23″N 16°41′42″E
- Country: Czech Republic
- Region: South Moravian
- District: Blansko
- First mentioned: 1110

Area
  - Total: 11.20 km^{2} (4.32 sq mi)
- Elevation: 377 m (1,237 ft)

Population (2026-01-01)
  - Total: 979
  - Density: 87.4/km^{2} (226/sq mi)
- Time zone: UTC+1 (CET)
  - Summer (DST): UTC+2 (CEST)
- Postal code: 679 34
- Website: www.mestyskninice.cz

Knínice (Czech pronunciation: [ˈkɲiːɲɪtsɛ]; until 2015 Knínice u Boskovic) is a market town in Blansko District in the South Moravian Region of the Czech Republic. It has about 1,000 inhabitants.

== Etymology ==
The initial name of the settlement was Knihnice. The name was derived from the old Czech word kněhyně (in modern Czech kněžna), meaning 'princess'.

== Geography ==
Knínice is located about 19 kilometres (12 mi) north of Blansko and 36 km (22 mi) north of Brno. It lies on the border between the Boskovice Furrow and Drahany Highlands. The highest point is the hill Mojetín at 608 m (1,995 ft) above sea level. The Semíš Stream flows through the market town.

== History ==
The village was founded by Queen Euphemia of Hungary. The first written mention of Knínice is from 1110, when Queen Euphemia donated the village to the Hradisko Monastery in Olomouc. The monastery owned Knínice until the abolition of the monastery in 1784. In 1250, Knínice was promoted to a market town by King Wenceslaus I.

== Demographics ==
Historical population

Year	Pop.	±%
1869	972	—
1880	959	−1.3%
1890	950	−0.9%
1900	1,009	+6.2%
1910	973	−3.6%

Year	Pop.	±%
1921	947	−2.7%
1930	896	−5.4%
1950	843	−5.9%
1961	893	+5.9%
1970	831	−6.9%

Year	Pop.	±%
1980	823	−1.0%
1991	808	−1.8%
2001	779	−3.6%
2011	794	+1.9%
2021	868	+9.3%

Source: Censuses

== Transport ==
There are no major roads passing through the municipal territory. The railway that runs through Knínice is unused.

== Sights ==
The main landmark of Knínice is the Church of Saint Mark. It was built in the Neoclassical style in 1802–1806 on the site of an old medieval church. Next to the church is a unique wooden bell tower.
