= Otto II the Black =

Battle of Chlumec, history painting by Adolf Liebscher (1857–1919)

Otto II the Black (Czech: Ota II. Černý; c. 1085 – 18 February 1126), a member of the Přemyslid dynasty, ruled as a Moravian prince in Olomouc from 1107 and in Brno from 1123 until his death.

== Life ==
He was a younger son of Prince Otto I of Olomouc and his wife Euphemia, a daughter of the Árpád king Béla I of Hungary. He thereby was the grandson of the Bohemian duke Bretislav I. His father ruled in Olomouc since about 1055, troubled by the centralist efforts of his elder brothers Spytihněv II and Vratislav II ruling as Bohemian dukes. When he died in 1087, Otto II and his elder brother Svatopluk were expelled from Olomouc.

While the dynastical struggles within the Přemyslid family continued, Otto II and Svatopluk were able to return to Moravia in 1091. Svatopluk finally ascended the throne in Prague in 1107, having deposed his cousin Bořivoj II. Otto temporarily acted as a Bohemian regent; in 1108/09 he and Savatopluk were taken hostage by King Henry V of Germany. When Svatopluk was killed in September 1109, his brother Otto, though with considerable support by the Bohemian nobility, was not able to assert his claims to the Prague throne, which was taken by Otto's cousin Vladislav I.

Around 1113 Otto married the Swabian countess Sophia, daughter of Count Henry I of Berg. Sophia's sister Richeza of Berg had married Duke Vladislav I about 1111. Otto's marriage produced three children: Euphemia, Otto III of Olomouc (1122–1160), and Dětleb, Bishop of Olomouc.

Otto found himself in constant conflict with Duke Vladislav. Nevertheless, in 1123 he was able to succeed Vladislav's younger brother Soběslav as Prince of Brno. When Duke Vladislav died in 1125, Otto again claimed the Bohemian throne according to the principle of agnatic seniority. When Vladislav's brother Soběslav succeeded, Otto turned to King Lothair II who marched against Bohemia with a German army. Both sides met in the Battle of Chlumec on 18 February 1126: Lothair's forces were decisively defeated and Otto was killed in action. After the battle, Soběslav approached King Lothair and received the Bohemian duchy as an Imperial fief.

Otto's widow Sophia returned to Swabia and probably retired to Zwiefalten Abbey.

== See also ==
- Salomea of Berg - sister in law

Otto II the Black Přemyslid dynasty Born: c. 1085 Died: 18 February 1126
Regnal titles
Preceded by Svatopluk	Prince of Olomouc; 1107–1126	Succeeded by Václav
