= European Heritage Label =

Heritage recognition awarded by the EU

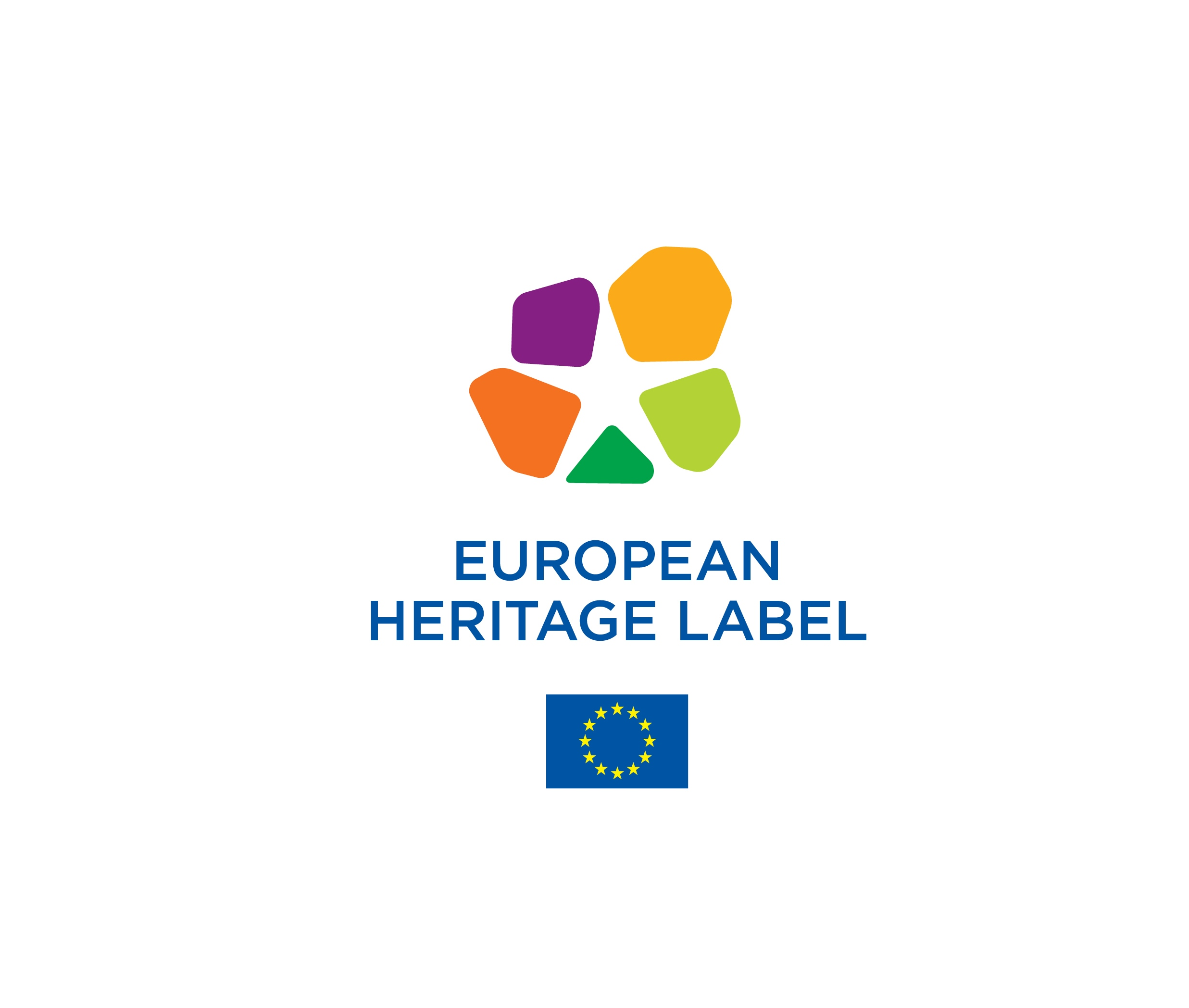
Official EHL logo

The European Heritage Label is a recognition awarded by the European Union to buildings, documents, museums, archives, monuments, and events which are seen as milestones in the creation of today's Europe. The program is managed by the European Commission.

== History ==
=== Intergovernmental initiative ===
The European Heritage Label started as an intergovernmental initiative between 17 individual EU member states during a meeting in Granada, Spain on 28 April 2006. Motivations for creating the initiative included the 2005 referendums in France and the Netherlands, which resulted in the two countries not ratifying a constitution for Europe. The initiative's main aim was to identify and designate sites which have played a key role in building a united Europe and to see those sites through a European, rather than national, viewpoint.

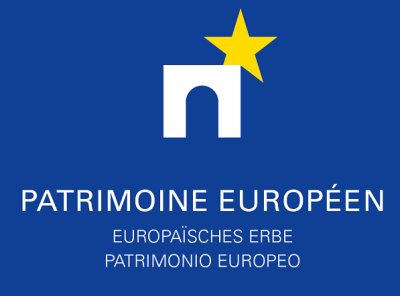
Logo for the former intergovernmental scheme

The intergovernmental initiative connected both EU member states and non-member states such as Switzerland. The participating countries’ heritage agencies awarded the Label to sites with cross-border or pan-European character. The countries chose their own cultural assets, whether physical sites or more abstract traditions, meaning that the criteria for the Label varied per country. By 2010, 64 sites in 18 different participating countries had been awarded the intergovernmental label.

=== Transformation into an EU initiative ===
On 20 November 2008, the Council adopted conclusions aimed at transforming the intergovernmental initiative into a Union action by inviting the Commission to submit to it a proposal for the creation by the Union of a European Heritage Label and to specify the practical procedures for the implementation of the project. Public hearings and impact assessments were carried out, confirming the added value of EU involvement. In 2010, the European Commission announced the plans for the EU-wide scheme known as the European Heritage Label and it was officially established on 16 November 2011.

== European Heritage Label from 2013 ==
Under the new Label, the first four sites were designated in 2013, with sixteen more designations following in 2014.

Candidate sites for the label must have a symbolic European value and must have played a significant role in the history and culture of Europe and/or the building of the Union. They must therefore demonstrate one or more of the following:

1. their cross-border or pan-European nature: how their past and present influence and attraction go beyond the national borders of a Member State;
2. their place and role in European history and European integration, and their links with key European events, personalities or movements;
3. their place and role in the development and promotion of the common values that underpin European integration.

During the pre-selection stage, EU countries may choose up to two sites biennially, following which, at selection stage, a panel of 13 independent experts select and monitor the sites. The panel examines the applications and recommends to the European Commission which sites should be awarded the label on the basis of an established set of criteria. Candidate sites must also submit a work plan.

== Participating countries ==
The following countries participate in the program:

- Austria
- Belgium
- Bulgaria
- Croatia
- Cyprus
- Czech Republic
- Denmark
- Estonia
- France
- Germany
- Greece
- Hungary
- Italy
- Latvia
- Lithuania
- Luxembourg
- Malta
- Netherlands
- Poland
- Portugal
- Romania
- Slovakia
- Slovenia
- Spain

== Selected sites ==
The sites currently holding the label are:

=== Austria ===
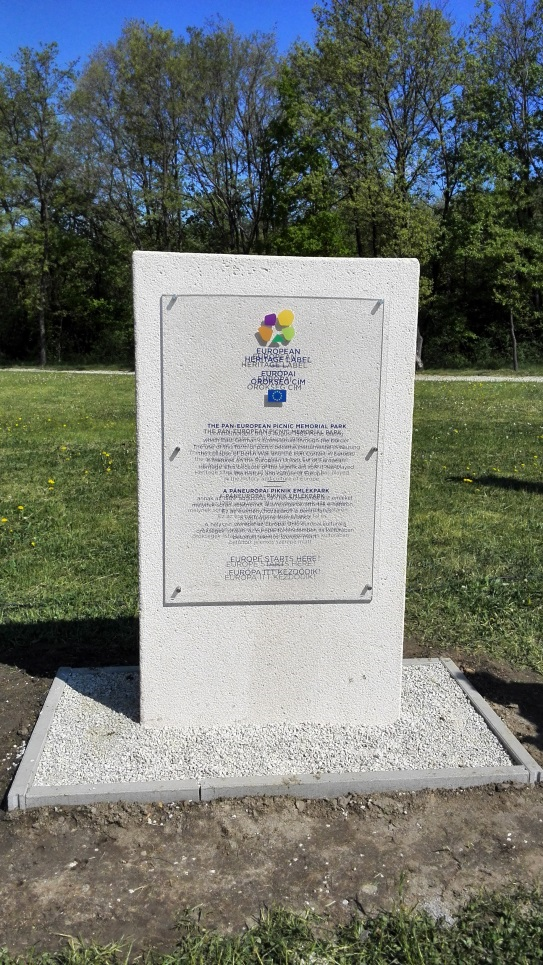
Picture is a European Heritage Label Plaque

- Archaeological Park Carnuntum
- The Imperial Palace Vienna, Vienna
- Werkbund Estates in Europe - Werkbundsiedlung Vienna

=== Belgium ===
- Mundaneum, Mons
- Bois du Cazier, Charleroi
- Colonies of Benevolence
- MigratieMuseumMigration, Brussels
- Royal Theatre Toone, Brussels

=== Croatia ===
- Krapina Neanderthal Site, Krapina
- Vučedol Culture Museum, Vukovar

=== Czech Republic ===
- Olomouc Premyslid Castle and Archdiocesan Museum, Olomouc
- Kynžvart Castle – Place of diplomatic meetings
- Werkbund Estates in Europe - Osada Baba (Prague), Nový dům (Brno)

=== Estonia ===
- Great Guild Hall, Tallinn
- Historic Ensemble of the University of Tartu, Tartu

=== Finland ===
- Seminaarinmäki Campus (2021)
- Kalevala, the national epic of Finland (2023)
- The industrial heritage of Varkaus, Varkaus (2025)

=== France ===
- Abbey of Cluny
- Robert Schuman's House, Scy-Chazelles
- European District of Strasbourg
- Former Natzweiler-Struthof Concentration Camp
- Le Chambon-sur-Lignon Memorial

=== Germany ===
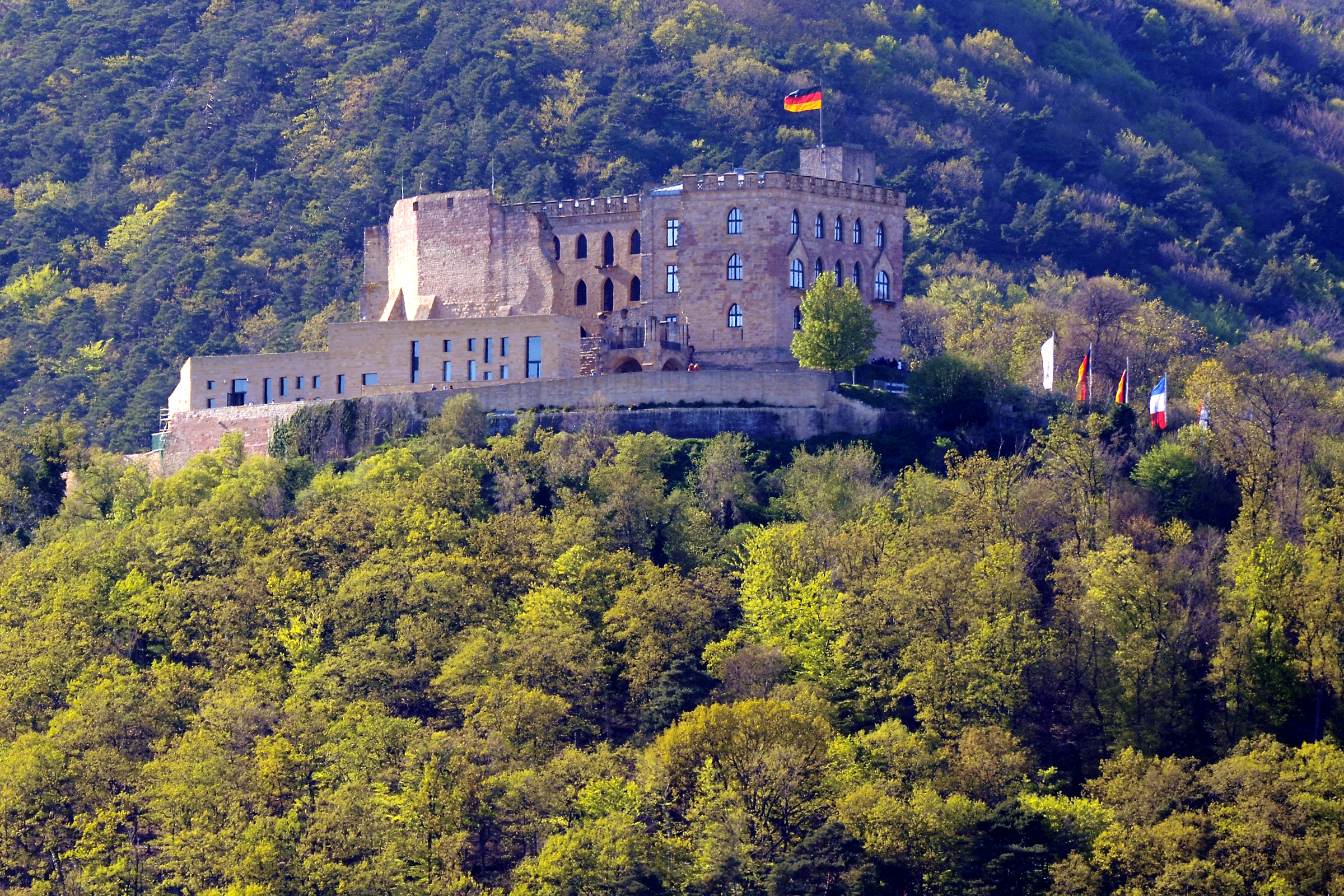
Hambach Castle

- Hambach Castle
- Münster and Osnabrück – Sites of the Peace of Westphalia
- Leipzig’s Musical Heritage Sites
- Werkbund Estates in Europe - Weissenhof Estate (Stuttgart)

=== Greece ===
- The Heart of Ancient Athens

=== Hungary ===
- Liszt Ferenc Academy of Music, Budapest
- Pan-European Picnic Memorial Park, Sopron
- Dohány Street Synagogue Complex
- Living Heritage of Szentendre

=== Italy ===
- Casa Alcide de Gasperi museum, Pieve Tesino
- Fort Cadine Trentino
- Archaeological Area of Ostia Antica

=== Latvia ===
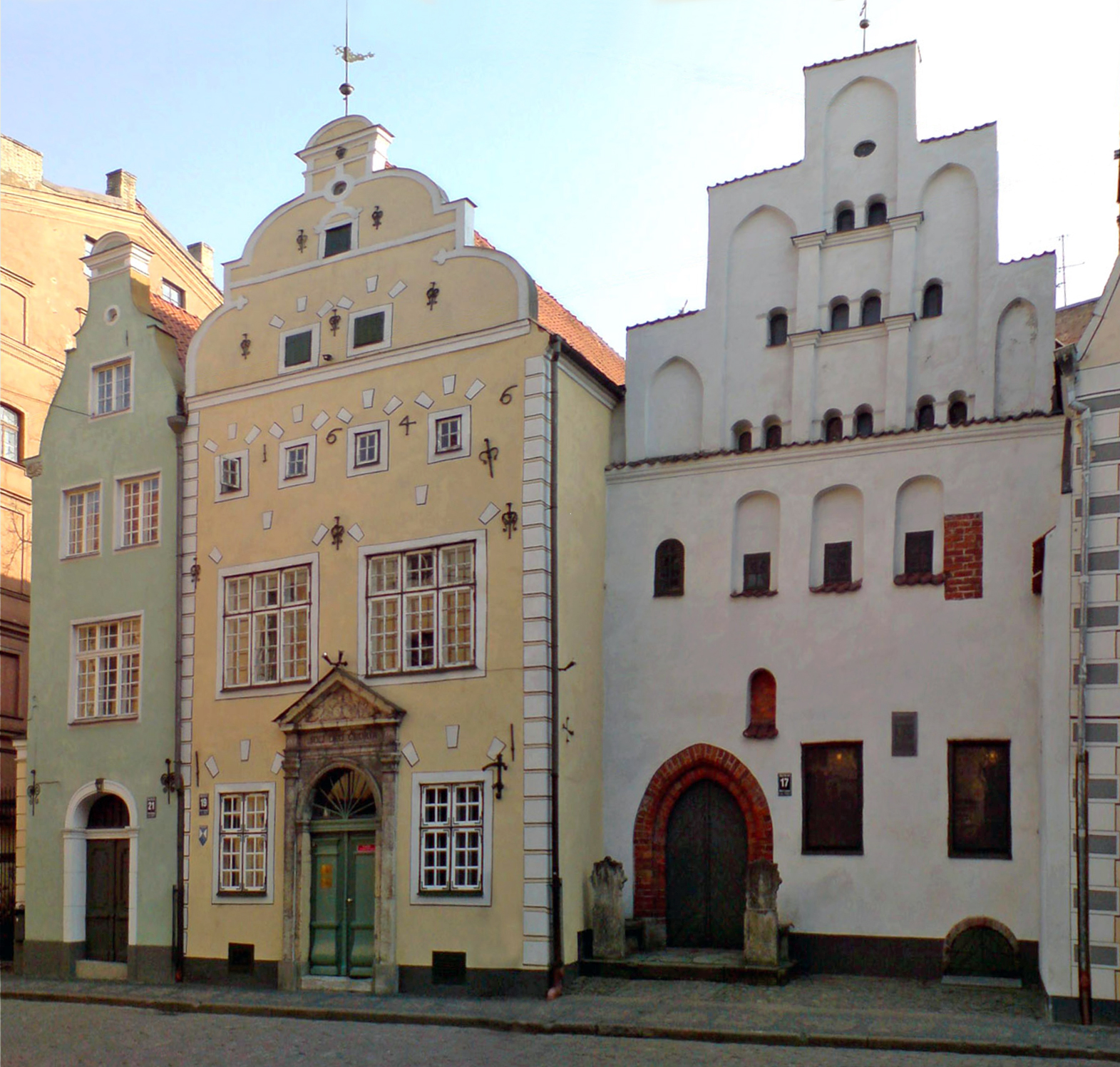
Three Brothers in Riga

- Three Brothers, Riga

=== Lithuania ===
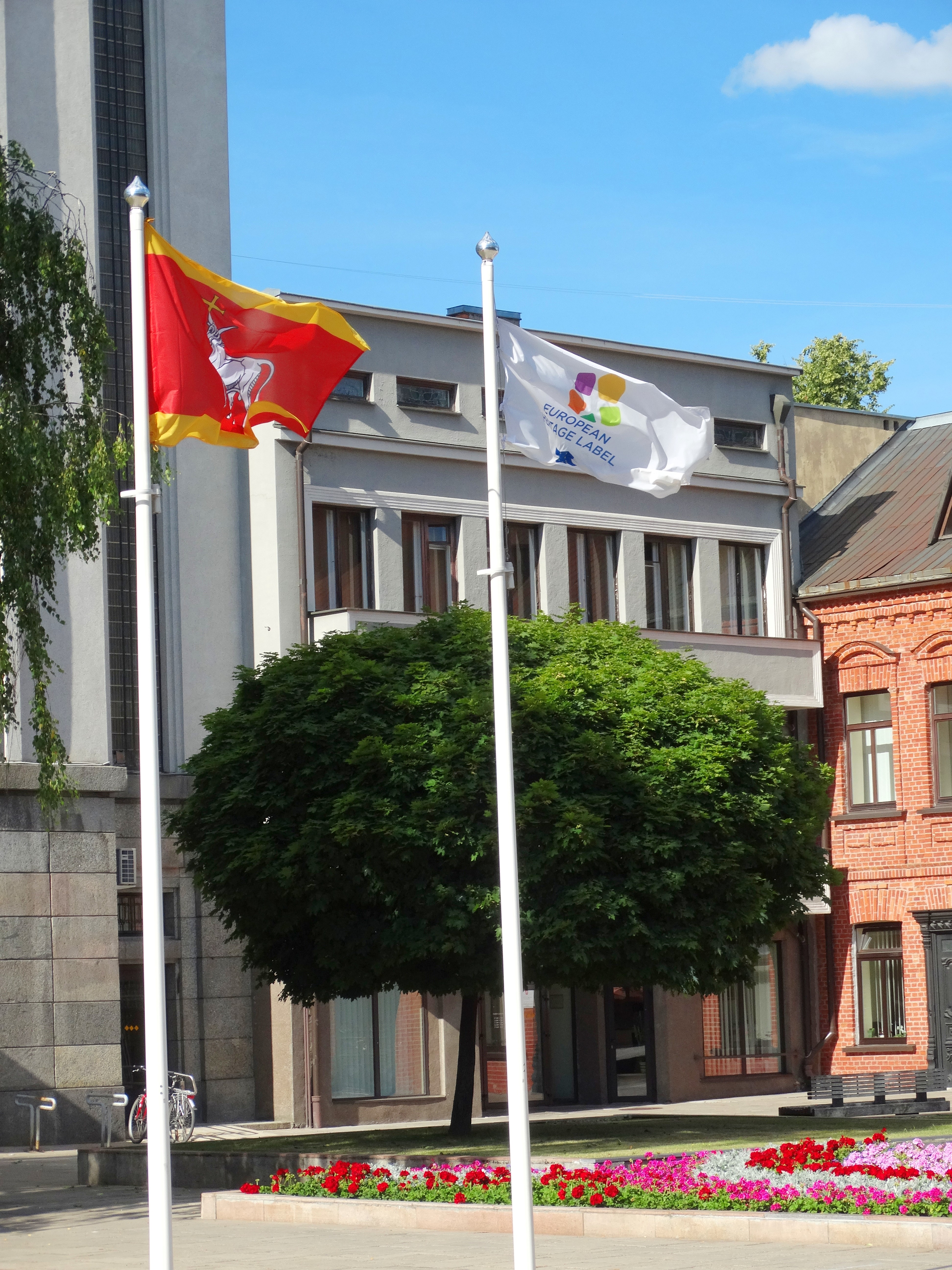
Flag of the European Heritage Label in Kaunas, Lithuania

- Modernist architecture of Kaunas of 1919–1940

=== Luxembourg ===
- Village of Schengen, birthplace of the Schengen Agreement

=== Netherlands ===
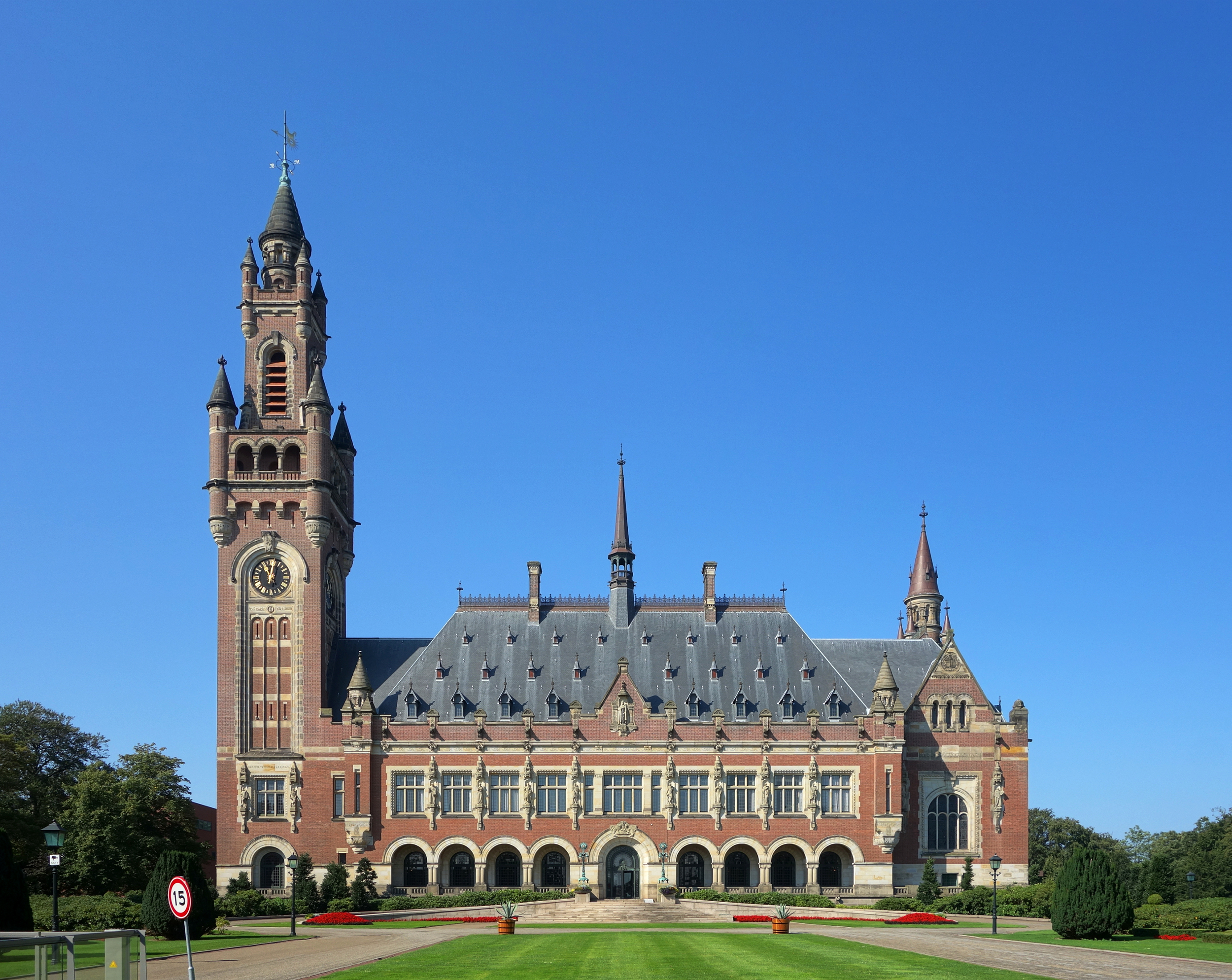
The Peace Palace in The Hague, Netherlands

- Camp Westerbork
- Peace Palace, The Hague
- The Maastricht Treaty
- Colonies of Benevolence
- Ons' Lieve Heer op Solder, Amsterdam

=== Poland ===
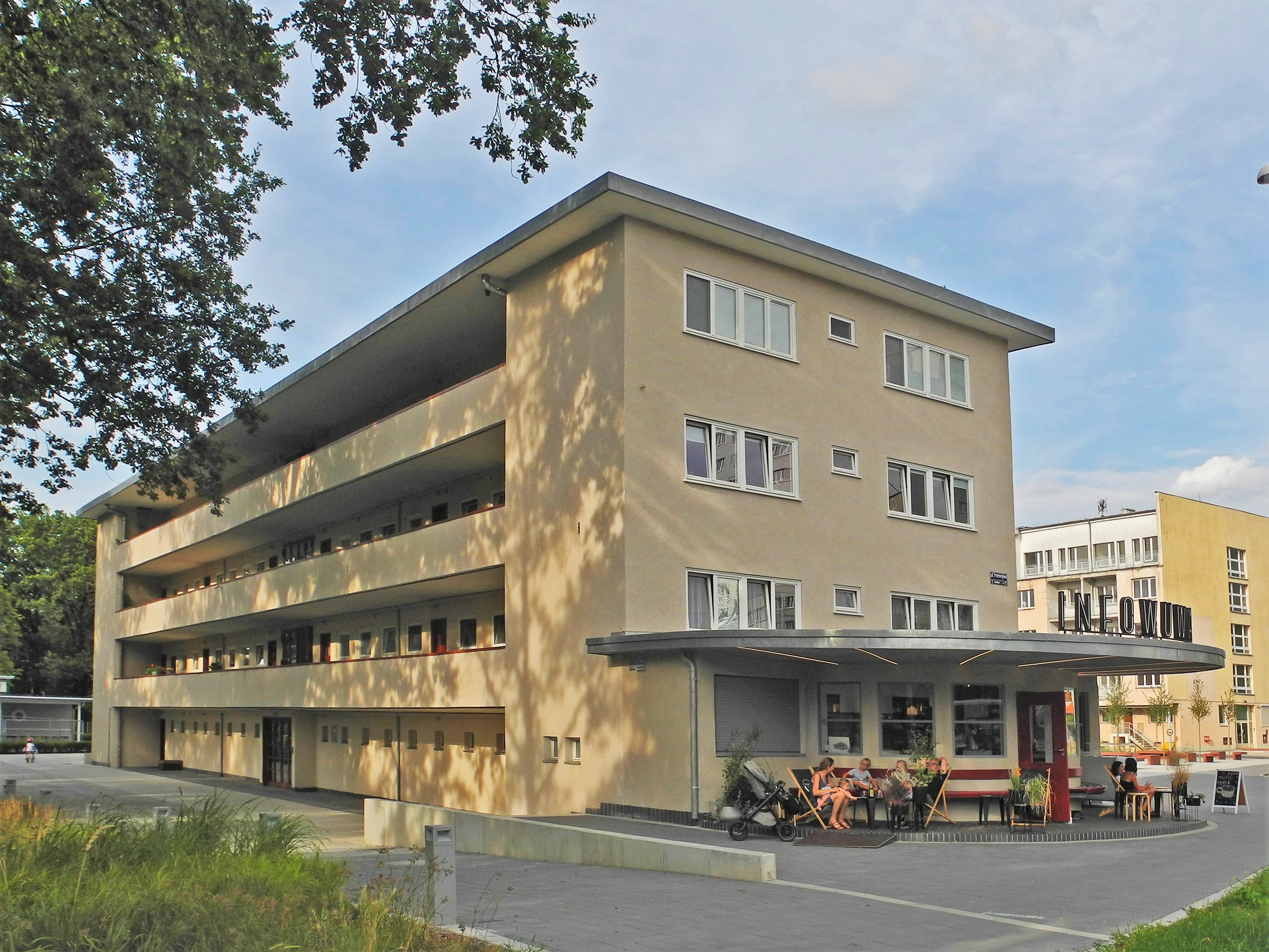
WuWA in Wrocław

- Gdańsk Shipyard
- Constitution of 3 May 1791, Warsaw
- Union of Lublin
- World War I Eastern Front Cemetery No. 123
- Site of Remembrance in Łambinowice
- Werkbund Estates in Europe – WuWA (Wrocław)

=== Portugal ===
- Charter of the Law of Abolition of the Death Penalty (1867), Lisbon
- University of Coimbra General Library
- Sagres Point
- Underwater Cultural Heritage of the Azores

=== Romania ===
- Sighet Memorial

=== Slovakia ===
- Medieval wall painting in the Gemer and Malohont regions (2021)

=== Slovenia ===
- Franja Partisan Hospital
- Church of the Holy Spirit, Javorca
- Zdravljica - the Message of the European Spring of Nations

=== Spain ===
- Archive of the Crown of Aragon, Barcelona
- Residencia de Estudiantes, Madrid

== The logo ==
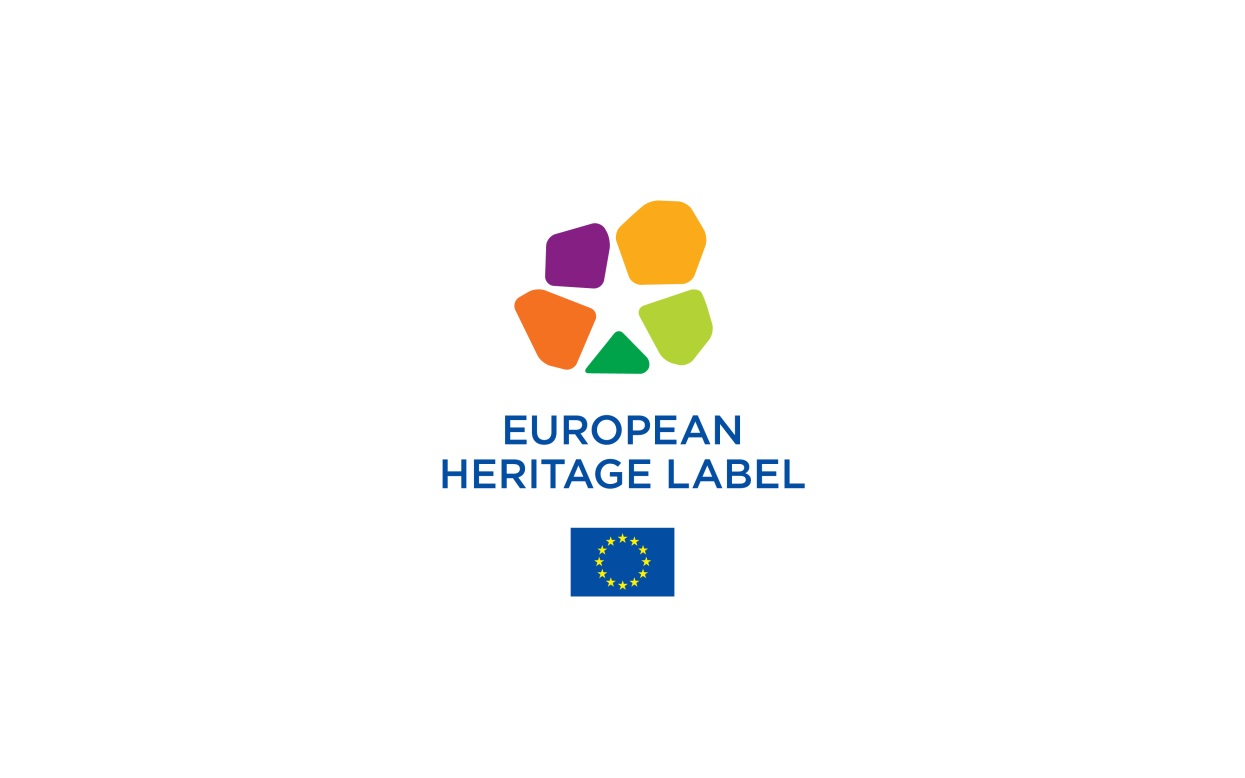
New European Heritage Label Logo

The logo of the new European Heritage Label was selected following a competition held in 2012.

The Label itself is awarded as a large plaque bearing an inscription in the national language and in English and a small plaque with just the logo. All of the large plaques contain the common element: "It features on the European Union’s list of European Heritage sites because of the significant role it has played in the history and culture of Europe."

== See also ==
- List of heritage registers
