= Hradisko Monastery =

- Klášter Hradisko
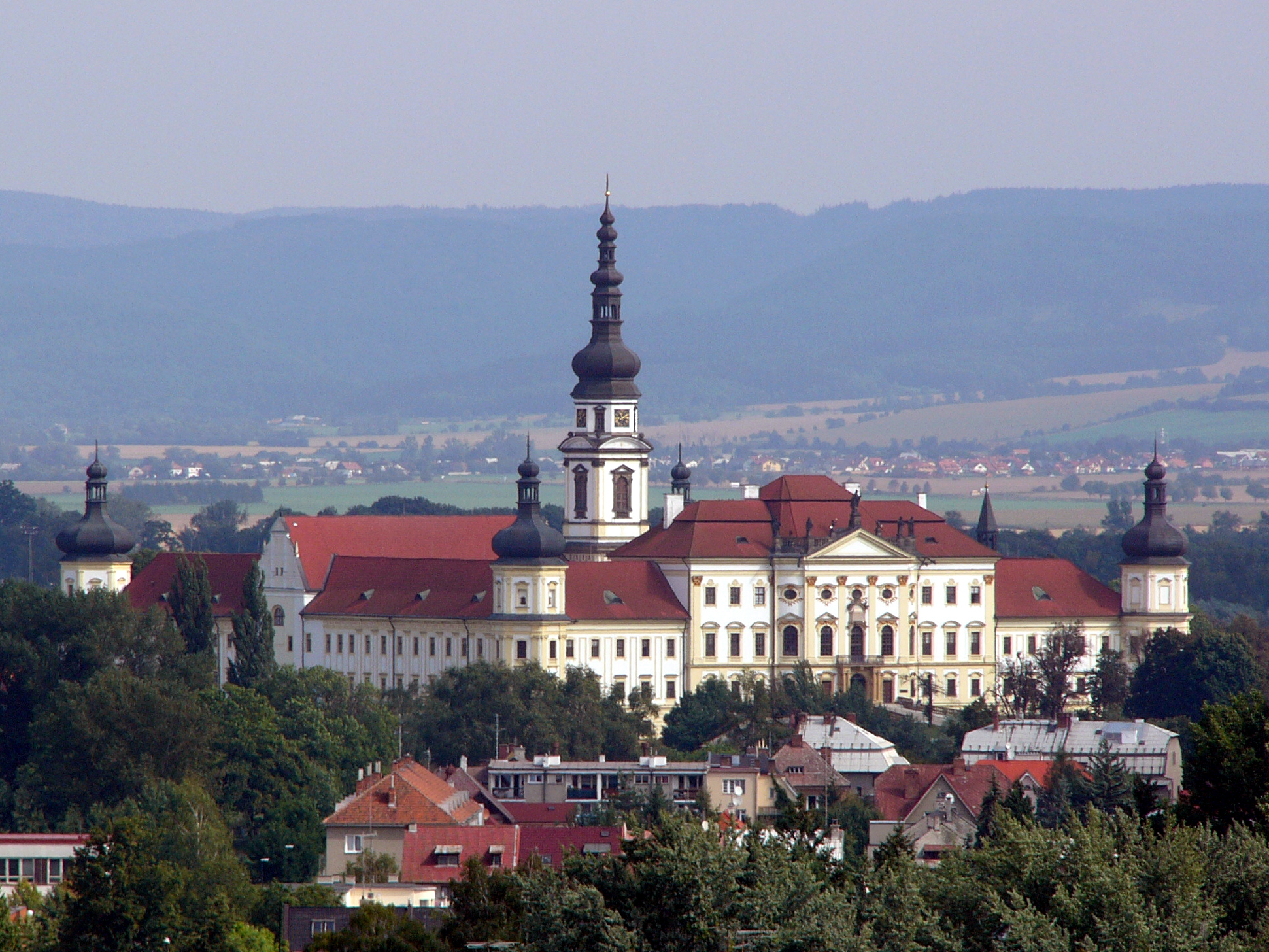
- Southwest view of Hradisko Monastery
- Interactive map of Hradisko Monastery

Monastery information
- Other names: Klášterní Hradisko, Hradiště, Moravský Escorial
- Order: Order of Saint Benedict (until 1151); Premonstratensians (until 1784)
- Established: 3 February 1078
- Disestablished: 18 August 1784
- Dedication: Saint John

People
- Founders: Otto I of Olomouc and wife Euphemia of Hungary

Architecture
- Functional status: Olomouc military hospital and public heritage site
- Heritage designation: 262/1995
- Designated date: 16 August 1995
- Architect: Giovanni Pietro Tencalla
- Style: Italian Mannerism (northern part of the monastery) and High Baroque (Prelature building)

Site
- Location: Olomouc, Olomouc Region, Czech Republic
- Coordinates: 49°36′22″N 17°15′55″E
- Other information: Czech Heritage Site

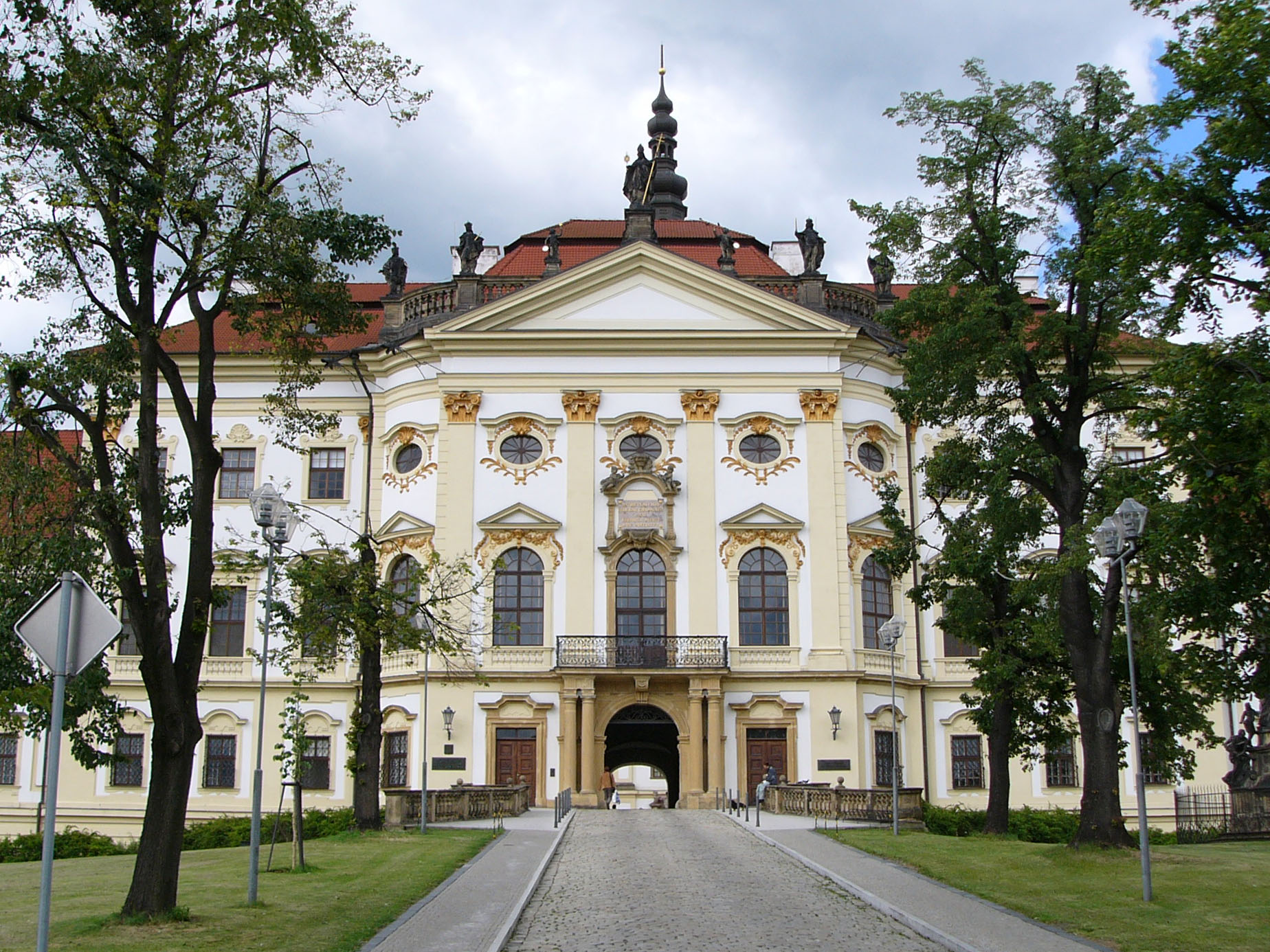
Entrance to Hradisko Monastery

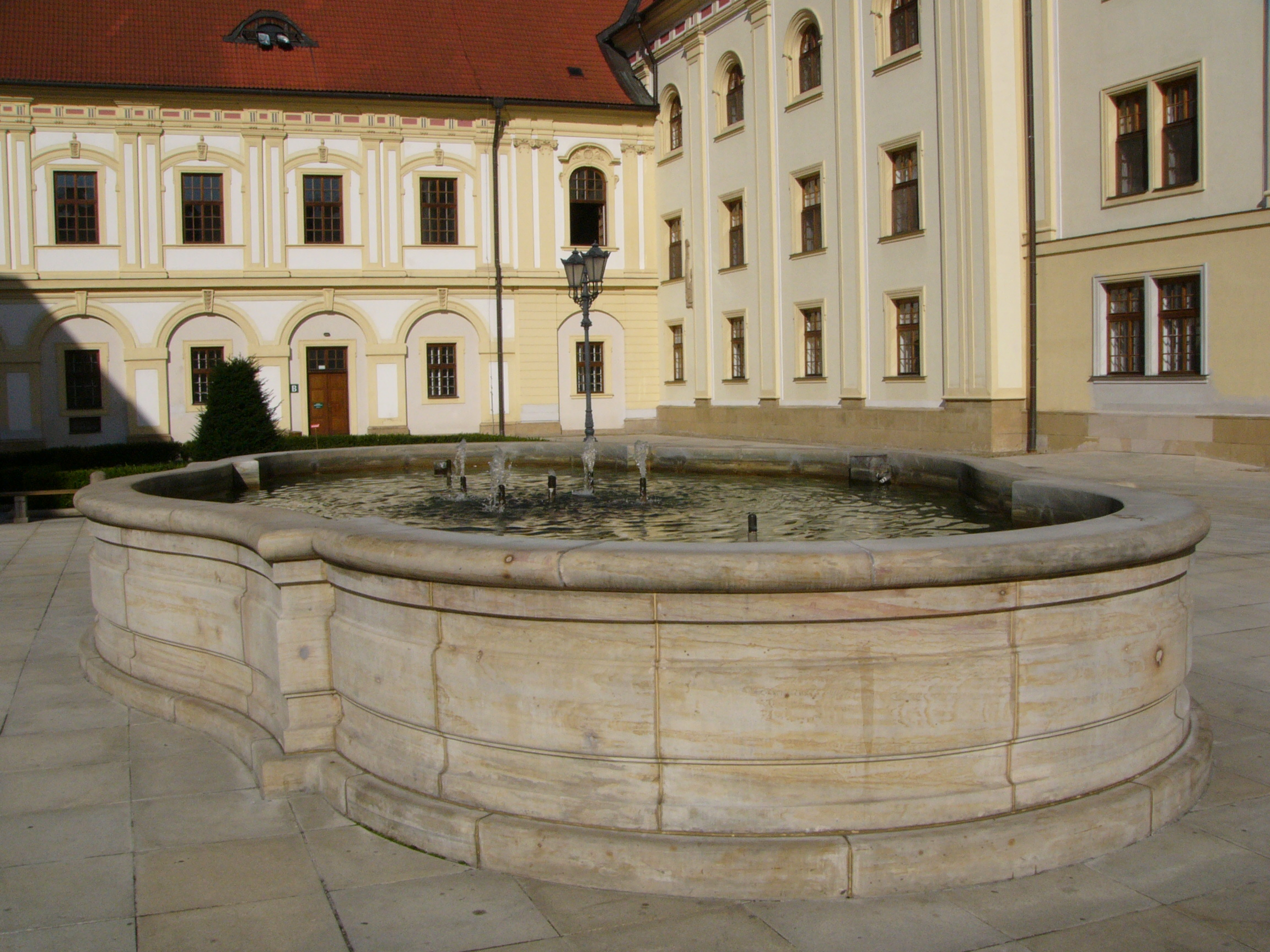
Saturn fountain at courtyard

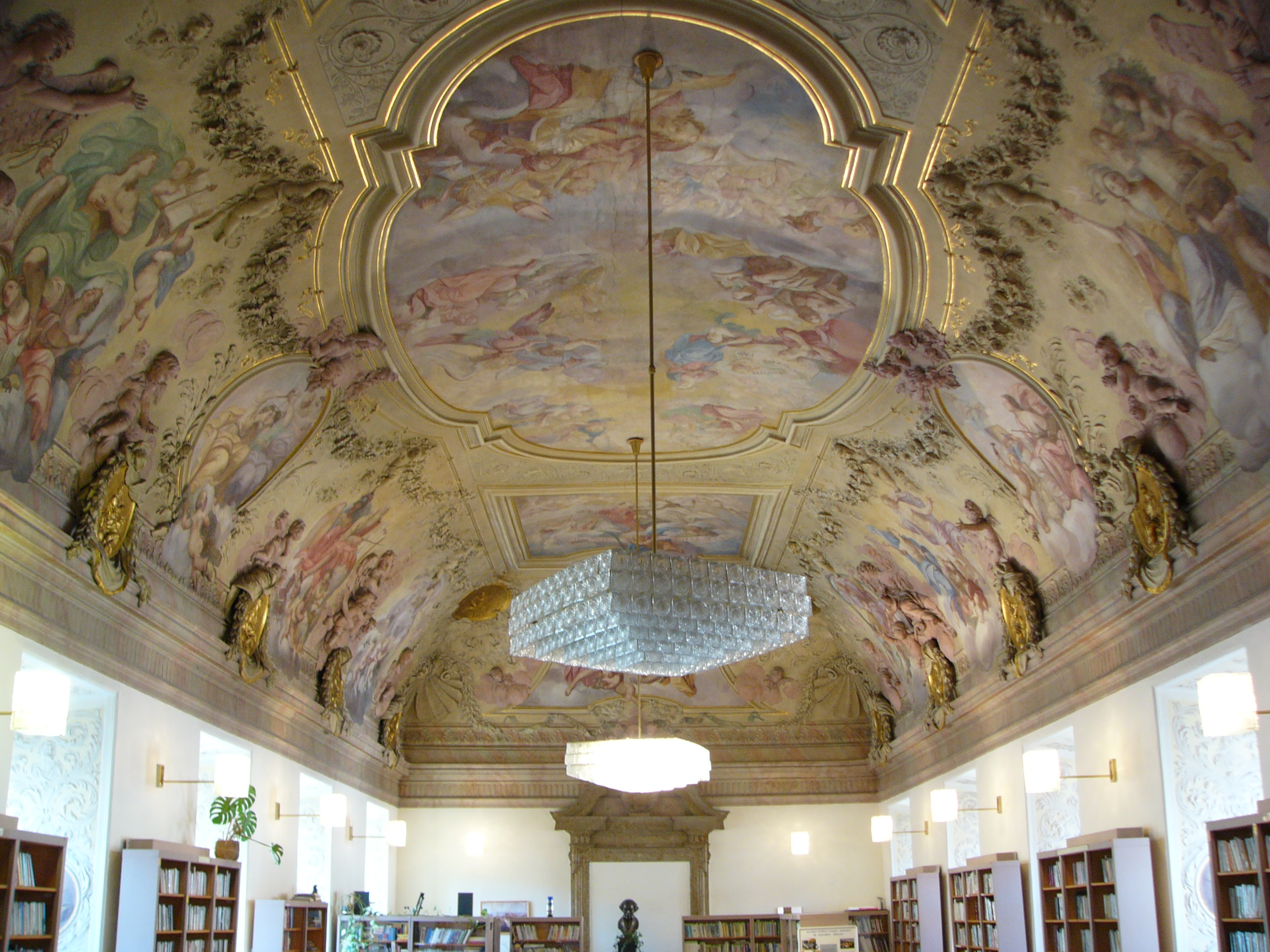
Library in Hradisko Monastery

Hradisko Monastery or Monastery Hradisko (Czech language: Klášter Hradisko or Klášterní Hradisko, or simply Hradiště; colloquially also: Moravský Escorial, English: Castle Monastery or Hillfort Monastery) is a former monastery and a former village north-east of the city of Olomouc, nowadays a suburb of Olomouc. Originally a Benedictine monastery, from the mid-12th century a Premonstratensian monastery, located in the historical principality of Moravia and Margraviate of Moravia, now part of present-day Czech Republic. The large complex occupies an area of more than one hectare, and since 1802 has served as a military hospital.

In 1995 it was declared a cultural heritage site.

== Etymology ==
In Moravia, Hradisko more often refers to a castle settlement—from Czech Hradiště (Hillfort, Gord): a fortified settlement from the Neolithic to Early Middle Ages, the forerunner of medieval castles and towns.

== History ==
North of Olomouc Castle, on the opposite left bank of the Morava River, lies a small rocky hill named Hradisko. A Přemyslid castle (settlement) was originally built on the site in 1030, which had been the seat of prince Otto I of Olomouc, the youngest son of Bretislav I Duke of Bohemia. Earlier colonization has also been evidenced by the archaeological finds around Hradisko monastery of abandoned settlements. In 1077, Otto and his wife Euphemia of Hungary invited the Benedictine monks from Břevnov Monastery to establish a monastery "in honour of the Saviour and Saint John the Apostle", and furnished the founding of Hradisko monastery with rich endowments. The abbey church was consecrated to Saint John in 1078 by the Olomouc Bishop Johannes I and in 1087 the site was therefore designated as "Saint John's Monastery of Olomouc suburb". Under the reign of the Přemyslid princes in Olomouc during 11th and 12th centuries, the monastery became the centre of spiritual life and a burial site for the Olomouc Přemyslids. Around 1140, the oldest Moravian chronicler, the so-called "Hradisko analyst" (hradišťský analista), a Benedictine monk, was in residence at the monastery.

In 1151, the monastery reached a significant milestone when the Benedictine monks were expelled from Olomouc and the monastery was assigned to the Order of the Premonstratensians. The Benedictine monks were forced to leave Hradisko and found reception at the Opatovice nad Labem monastery (cs:Opatovický klášter) in east Bohemia. This change may have been linked more broadly with the former trend when the Premonstratensians became a mainstay of religious reform and the papacy, and therefore their arrival in the Czech lands was accompanied by hostility towards the Benedictines. In 1784, Emperor Joseph II abolished the monastery, ending more than six hundred years of the Premonstratensian monastery. At the time, more than 70 monks lived in the monastery, who mostly devoted themselves to spiritual administration.

In the 18th century the monastery was a centre of Jansenism. After the secularization of church property in 1783, the monastery served as the Moravian General Seminary for the priesthood education until 1790. After the death of Emperor Joseph II, the seminary was cancelled and the former monastery was handed over to the army. The army established a warehouse at first and during the Napoleonic wars in 1800 a French prisoner of war camp. From 1802 it was used as a military hospital. Today, the freely accessible facility continues as home to the Olomouc military hospital.

In 2017, a significant discovery was made in the Church of St Stephen at Klášterní Hradisko Monastery: a two-part reliquary containing the remains of several important medieval figures of Olomouc. These include, the Přemyslid prince of Olomouc, Otto I, one of the founders of the Monastery, his grandson Otto III, and their wives.

=== Architecture ===
The monastery grounds changed its appearance as the result of various historical events. During the centuries, Hradisko monastery was plundered, devastated and destroyed several times: 1241 by the Mongol invasion of Europe, 1429 by the Hussite Wars, 1432 by the Taborites, 1642 by the Swedish in the Thirty Years' War.

The present-day buildings were built in the spirit of Italian Mannerism and High Baroque between 1661-1737 according to the plans of the Italian-Swiss architect Giovanni Pietro Tencalla known for his work in Moravia in the service of the Bishop of Olomouc, and the Italian architect Domenico Martinelli. The monastery building is one of the most valuable preserved works of Central European Baroque architecture and belong to the architectural splendours of its time. The almost square floor plan, 100 × 115 metres, consisting of the four-winged building with a rectangular platform, with corner towers and a moat, was built on the foundations of the old monastery, and is divided by an inner lateral wing into two parts - the Convent and the Prelature.

== Attractions ==
- The abbey church was comprehensively redesigned in 1730. The Moravian "high baroque" painter Johann Christoph Handke (cs:Jan Kryštof Handke) created the ceiling artwork.
- The interior prelature decoration was presumably established according to plans by the Italian architect Domenico Martinelli, and adorned with sculptures by the Ticino sculptor, stucco plasterer and architect of "late baroque" Baldassarre Fontana, the Italian painter Innocenzo Monti, the Moravian baroque sculptor Jiří Antonín Heinz and the German sculptor Josef Winterhalder. The hallway paintings were created by the leading Austrian painters Daniel Gran and Paul Troger who created the monumental ceiling fresco on the theme of Christ's Feeding of the 5000 in the year 1731. The fresco is surrounded by a painting of illusive architecture by the Italian painter Agostino Tassi.
- Equally significant is the painting and stucco decoration of the library's vaults.

The former refectory ceiling artwork and sculpture of saint John of Nepomuk among other sculptures and reliefs in the ceremonial hall were created by Josef Winterhalder the Elder:

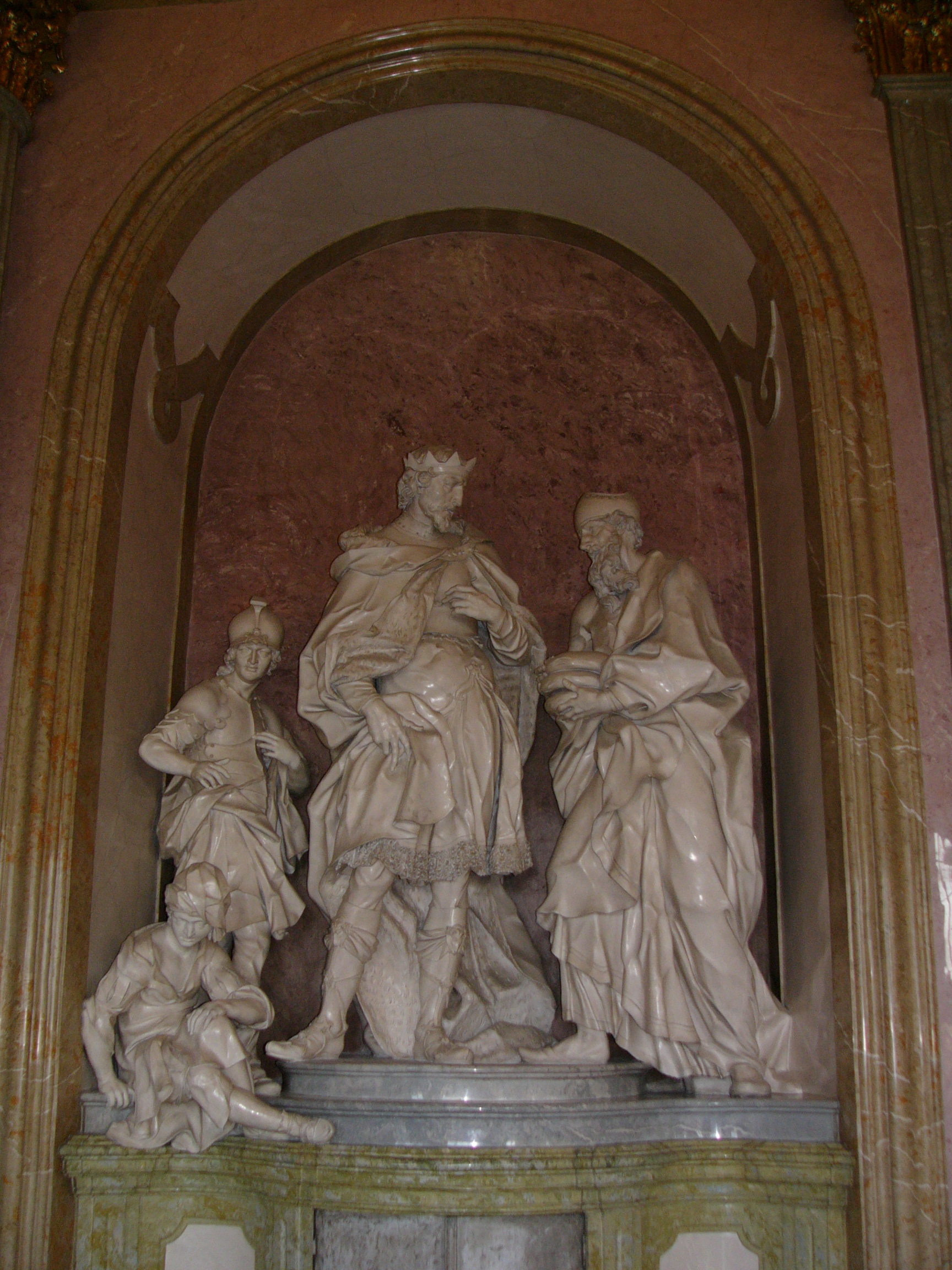
David receives sacral bread from the priest Ahimelech

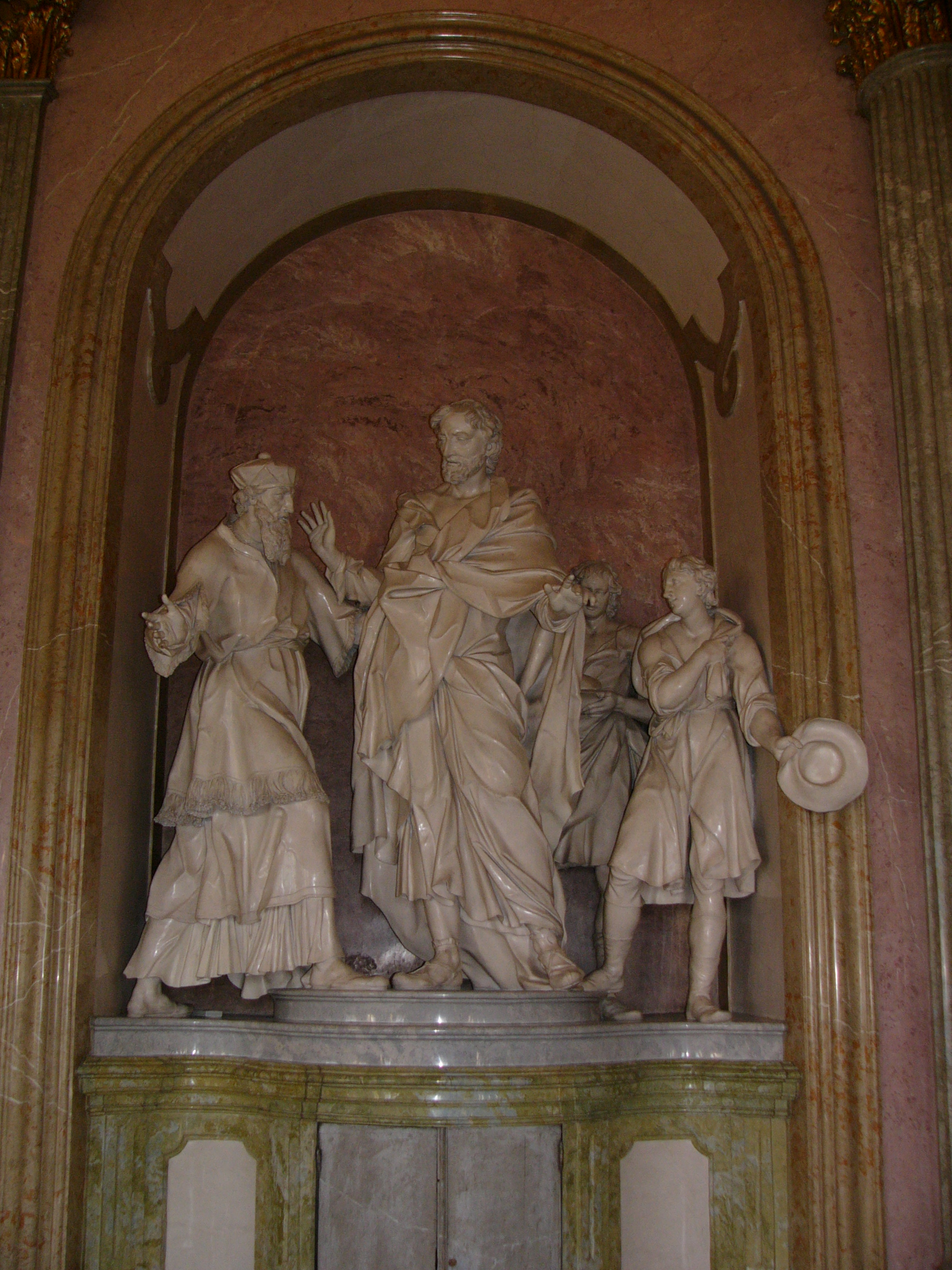
Samuel greeting Saul

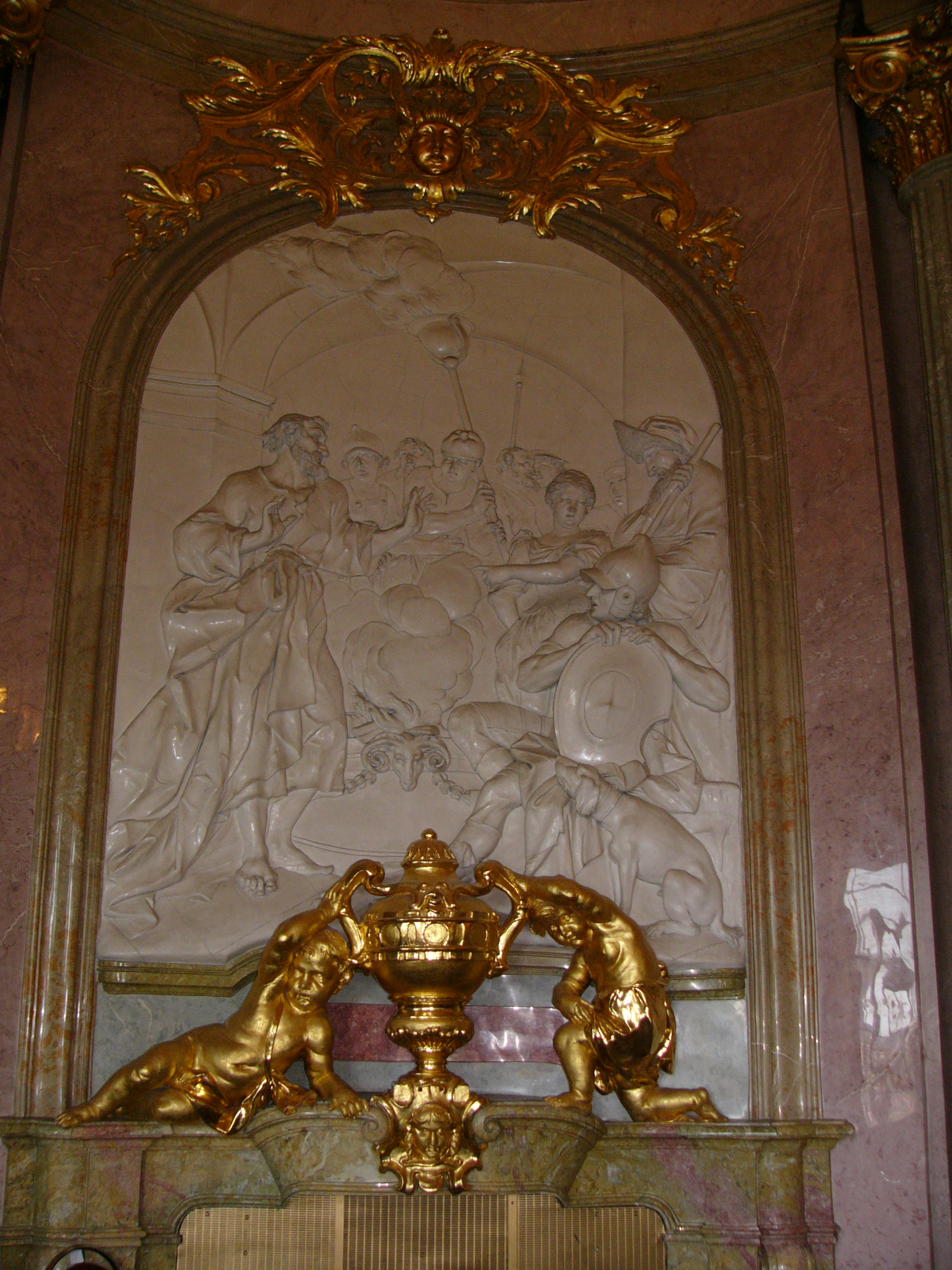
Peter's denial

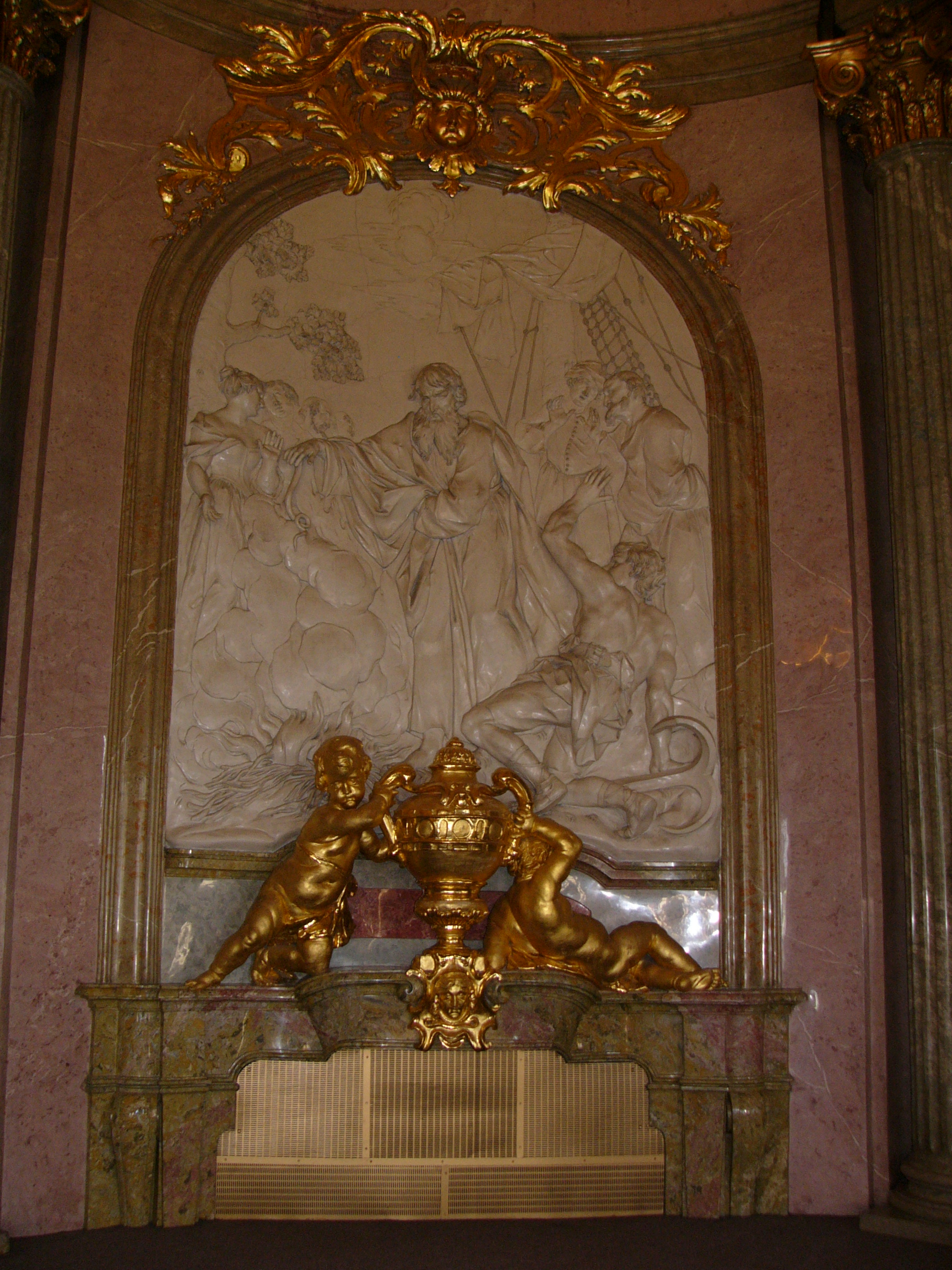
Apostle Paul's wreck on the isle Malta

== List of abbots ==
List of abbots of Hradisko Monastery till 1350:

- Jan (1078–1081)
- Bermar (1081–1116)
- Paulinus (1116–1127)
- Deocarus (1138–1144)
- Jiřík (cca 1149–1159)
- Blažej (mentioned to 1160)
- Michal (mentioned to 1174)
- Dětřich (1184–1189)
- Hilar (mentioned to 1200)
- Heřman (1201–1216)
- Bonifác (1221–1223)
- Petr (1225–1230)
- Řivín (mentioned to 1232)
- Gerlach (1233–1238)
- Bonifác (1238–1239)
- Robert (1240–1267)
- Budiš (1269–1290)
- Roman (1290–1300)
- Bohuslav (1310–1315)
- Jindřich (1315–1322)
- Tomáš (1322–1332)
- Frydrych (1332–1336)
- Augustin (1336–1350)
- Mikuláš Rús (~1453)
