= Casa Alcide de Gasperi museum =

Historic house museum in Pieve Tesino, Italy

- Museo Casa De Gasperi
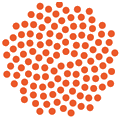

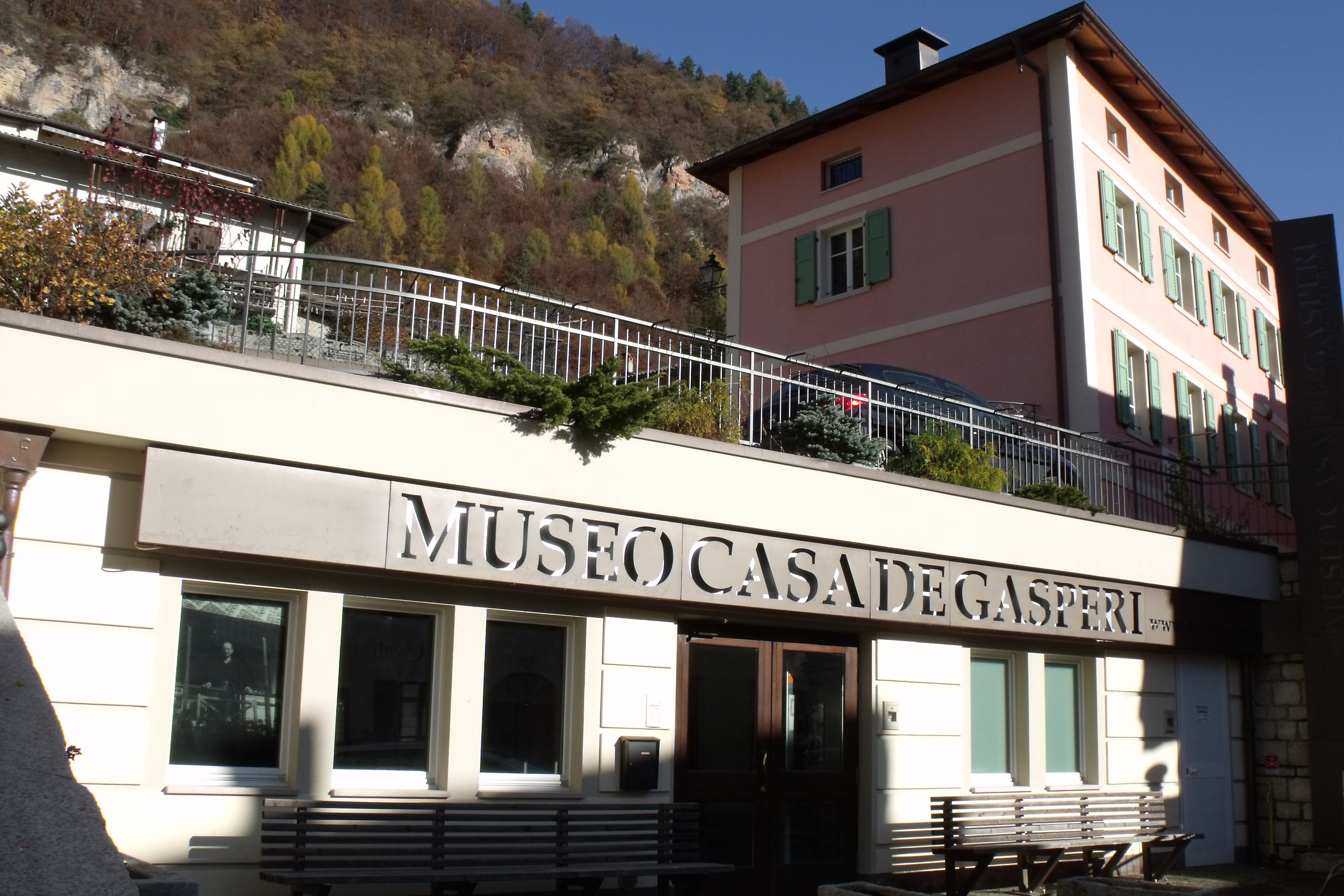

- Location within Trentino-Alto Adige/Südtirol
- Established: 18 August 2006
- Location: Pieve Tesino
- Coordinates: 46.0677°N 11.61277°E
- Type: Historic house museum
- Owner: Fondazione Trentina Alcide De Gasperi
- Website: degasperitn.it/it/museo-de-gasperi

Casa Alcide de Gasperi museum (Museo Casa De Gasperi), opened in 2006, is located in Pieve Tesino where the Italian statesman was born in 1881.

De Gasperi's effort was fundamental to the construction of the European Union, he played a decisive role in the reconstruction of Europe after World War II, culminating in his election as the president of the European Coal and Steel Community in 1954.

In addition to raising awareness on the de Gasperi figure, the purpose of the museum is to endorse the democratic values of the European Union, motivated also by its transboundary history and location between the Italian and German cultures.

The museum received the European Heritage Label.
