= Latvian Museum of Architecture =

Museum in Riga, Latvia

- Latvijas Arhitektūras muzejs
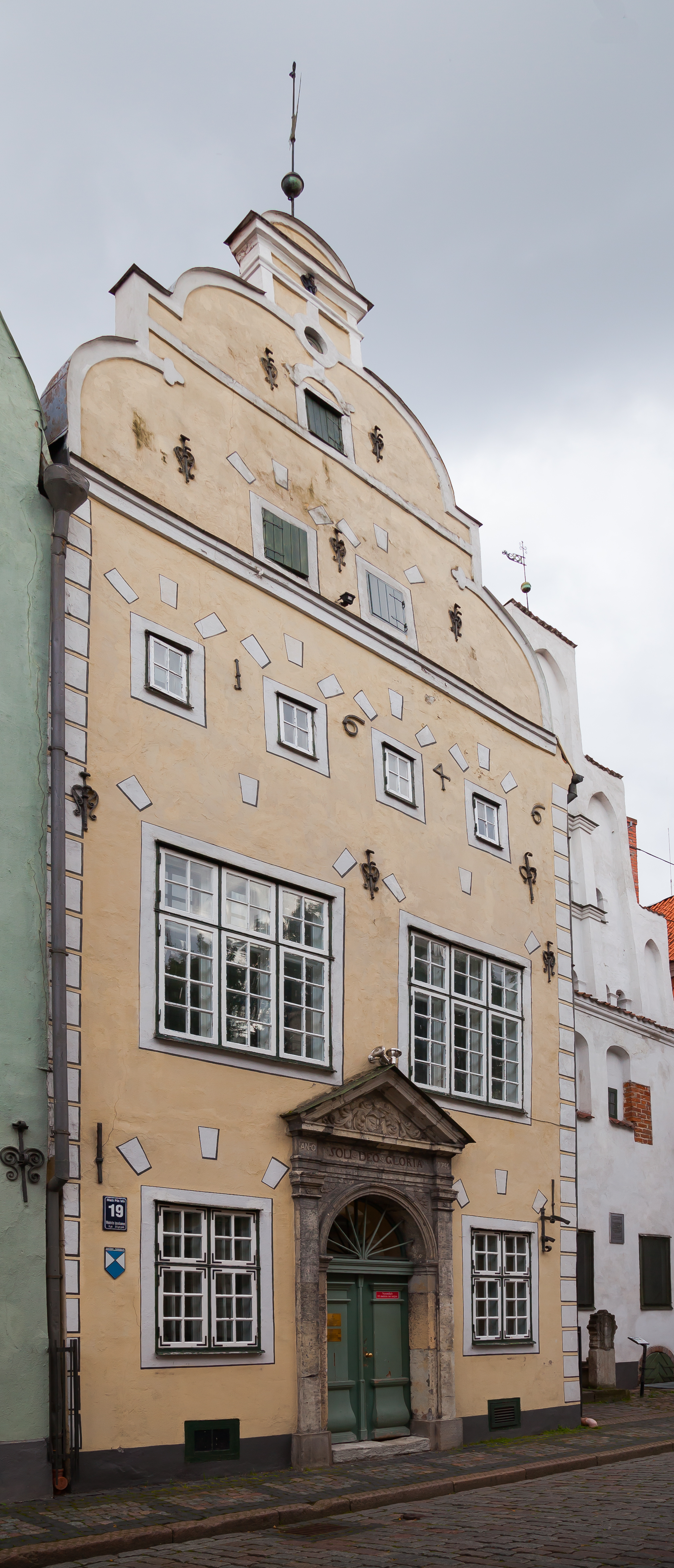
- Established: 1994
- Location: Latvia
- Coordinates: 56°57′01″N 24°06′16″E
- Collection size: 14,617
- Area: 170 m^{2} (1,800 sq ft)
- Website: www.archmuseum.lv
- Location of Latvian Museum of Architecture

The Latvian Museum of Architecture is a museum in Riga, Latvia. It is housed in an old medieval building which is part of the Three Brothers and belongs to the Latvian Museum Association.
