= Duke of Olomouc =

Duke of Olomouc (Latin: dux) or Prince of Olomouc (Czech: kníže olomoucký) was a title held by members of the Bohemian Přemyslid dynasty in medieval Moravia, where Olomouc was a gord (Slavic fortified settlement).

- Bretislav I (r. 1031–?)
- Otto (r. 1061–87)
- Boleslaus (r. fl. 1087)
- Svatopluk (r. 1090–1107)
- Otto the Black (r. fl. 1126)
- Václav (r. 1126–30)
- Otto III (r. 1140–60)
- Frederick (r. 1164–72)
- Oldřich (r. 1173–77)
- Vladimír (r. fl. 1195–96)
- Mikulaš (r. fl. 1269)

== Sources ==
- Berend, Nora; Urbańczyk, Przemysław; Wiszewski, Przemysław (19 December 2013). Central Europe in the High Middle Ages: Bohemia, Hungary and Poland, c.900–c.1300. Cambridge University Press. p. 411. ISBN 978-1-107-65139-5.
