= World War I Eastern Front Cemetery No. 123 =

Cemetery in Łużna–Pustki, Poland

Coordinates: 49.718°N 21.063°E

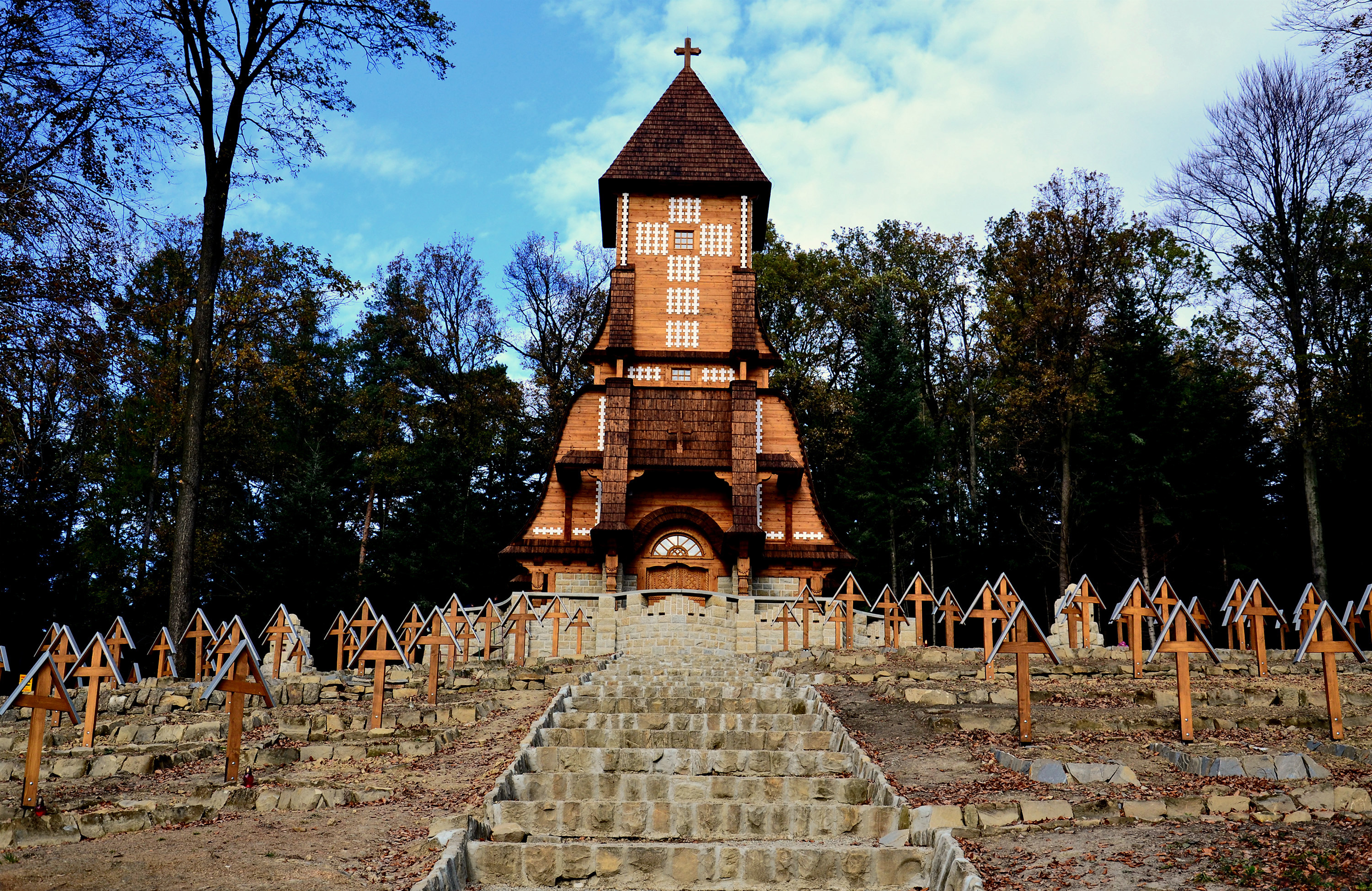
War Cemetery No. 123 after reconstruction

War Cemetery No. 123 – Łużna-Pustki (Polish: Cmentarz wojenny nr 123 – Łużna-Pustki) in Łużna village, Poland, is a soldier's burial place from the time of World War I, located on the Pustki hill.

Wartime cemetery No 123, established in 1918, is the location of one of the largest battles on the World War I Eastern front between the Austro-Hungarian and German armies and the Russian Army: the battle of Gorlice.

At the cemetery are buried:

- 912 soldiers of the Austro-Hungarian (nearly half of them Poles)
- 65 soldiers of the German army
- 227 soldiers of the Russian army

In February 2016, the European Commission added War Cemetery No. 123 Łużna Void historical buildings on the list of European Heritage Label. The granting of European Heritage Label was held in April 2016 in Brussels. This war cemetery voids is the fourth place in Poland honored this sign. The necropolis was awarded because it is a place of memory reflects the ideas of ecumenism and brotherhood, ensuring equal treatment for all those who died, regardless of their religious affiliation or ethnic origin and the fact on which side they fought.
