= Three Brothers, Riga =

Cluster of medieval houses in Riga, Latvia

Three Brothers
- Trīs brāļi
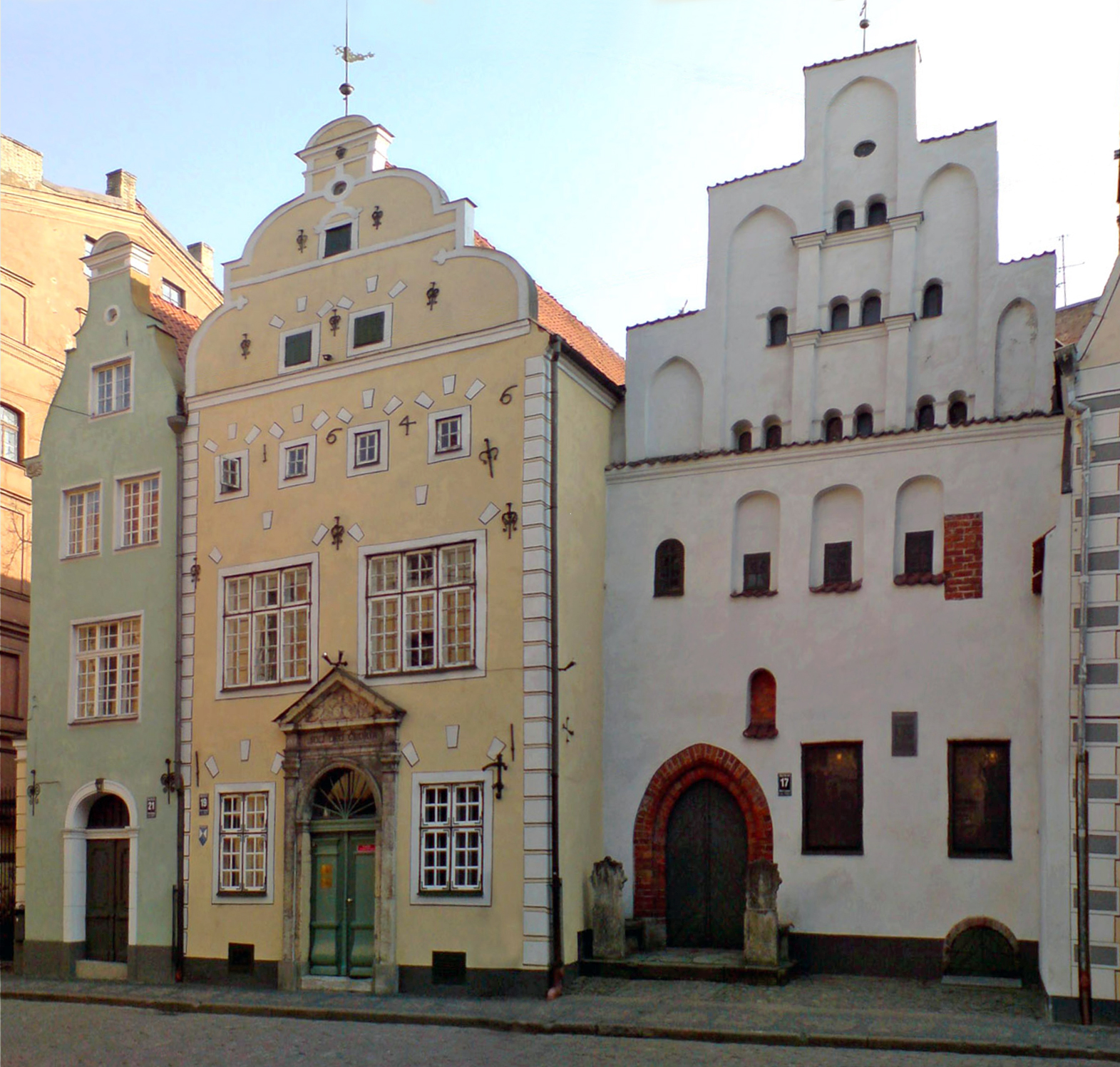

General information
- Status: Completed
- Type: Residential building complex
- Architectural style: Renaissance, Dutch Mannerism, Baroque
- Location: Mazā Pils iela 17, 19, 21, Riga, Latvia
- Coordinates: 56°57′01″N 24°06′15″E
- Current tenants: The National Heritage Board of Latvia; Latvian Museum of Architecture
- Year built: Late 15th century – 1718
- Renovated: 1953–1957

Design and construction
- Designations: State Monument of Architecture (No. 6544; 1998); European Heritage Label (2020)
- Known for: Oldest surviving stone residential complex in Riga

Renovating team
- Architect: Pēteris Saulītis

The Three Brothers (Latvian: Trīs brāļi) is a building complex consisting of three houses, situated in Riga, Latvia. The houses together form the oldest complex of dwelling houses in Riga. Each house represents various periods of development of dwelling house construction.

== History ==
The building at 17 Maza Pils Street is the oldest, dating from the late 15th century. The exterior of the building is characterised by crow-stepped gables, Gothic decorations, and a few early Renaissance details. Originally the building consisted internally of one large room and an attic used for storage. The house was restored in 1955–57 by architect Pēteris Saulītis.

The neighbouring house, 19 Maza Pils Street, has an exterior dating from 1646, with a stone portal added in 1746. The style of the building shows influences from Dutch Mannerism.

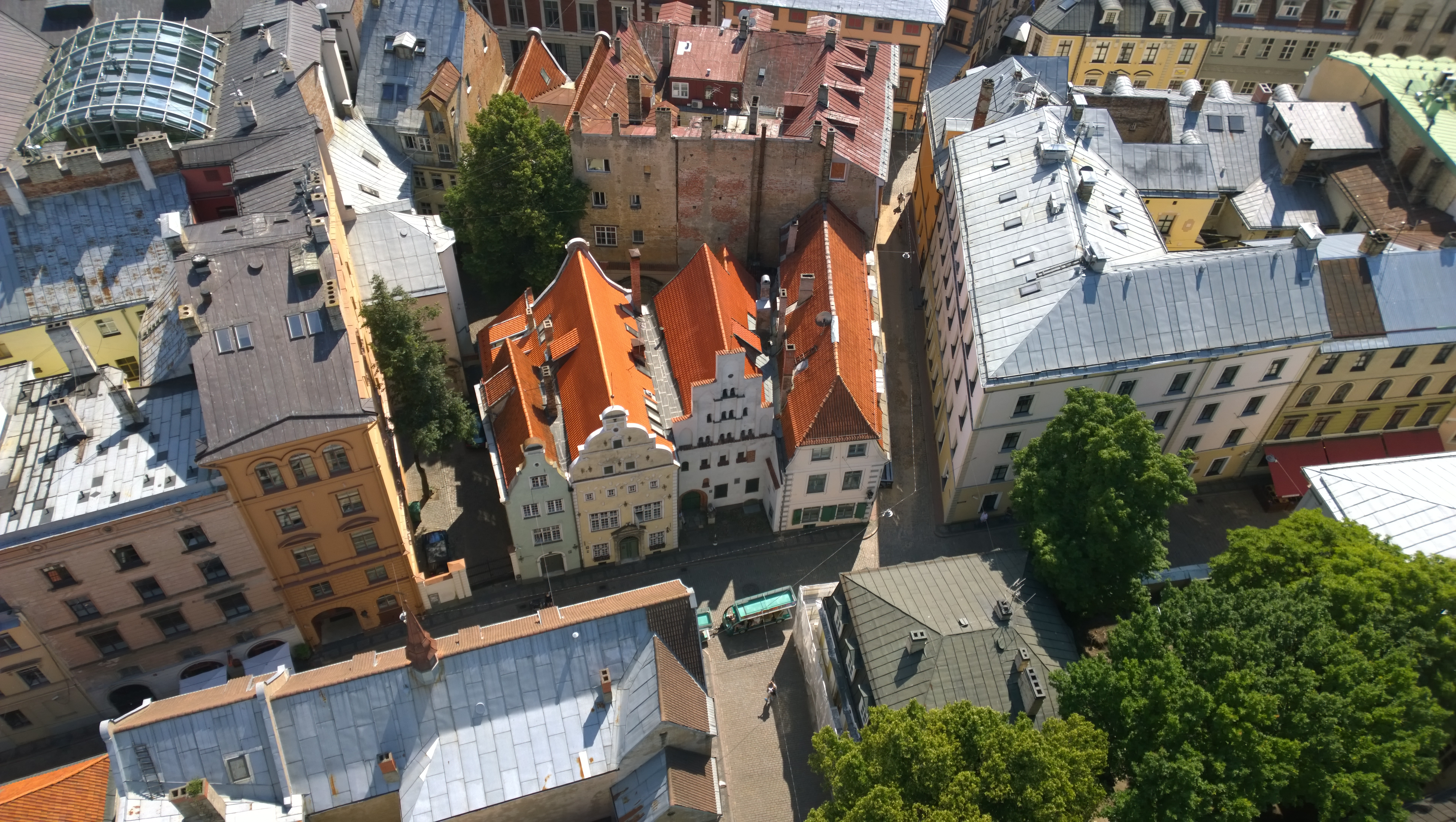
Aerial view of The Three Brothers

The last house of the three, located in 21 Maza Pils Street, is a narrow Baroque building which gained its present look probably during the late 17th century.

The Three Brothers complex today houses the State Inspection for Heritage Protection and the Latvian Museum of Architecture.

On April 1, 2020, the European Commission awarded Three Brothers the European Heritage Label.

== Location ==
The Three brothers are located in the center of Vecrīga, very close to central Dome Square and nearby Saeima. The buildings are at the addresses 17, 19 and 21 Maza Pils Street (Latvian: Mazā Pils iela).
