= Euphemia of Hungary =

Daughter of King Béla I of Hungary

- Born: c. 1055; Kingdom of Poland
- Died: 1111
- Burial: Hradisko Monastery, Olomouc, Czech Republic
- Spouse: Otto I of Olomouc
- Issue: Svatopluk, Duke of Bohemia; Otto II the Black
- House: Arpad (by birth), Přemyslid (by marriage)
- Father: Béla I of Hungary
- Mother: Richeza of Poland

Euphemia of Hungary was a daughter of King Béla I of Hungary and his wife, Richesa (or Adelaide) of Poland (1050s – 11 April 1111). She was the wife of Duke Otto I of Olomouc, the second son the Duke of Bohemia Bretislav I .

They were married before 1073.

Some researchers believe that Euphemia was the daughter of Bela's older brother Andrew I of Hungary and his wife Anastasia of Kiev, with the alternative name Adelhaid been proposed, due to minimal sources on her birth. Though the theory supported by most scholars and historians is that Euphemia was born as a result of a marriage between King Bela I and an unknown Piast Princess.

Together they have four children:

- Svatopluk, Duke of Bohemia (21 September 1109)
- Otto II the Black (18 February 1126)
- Bretislav
- Boleslava

Their youngest two children disappeared from written records and thus, are assumed to have died at a young age.

== Civil War ==
After her husband's death in 1087, Vratislaus II of Bohemia, who had been crowned King of Bohemia, gave the Principality of Olomouc to his own son, Bořivoj II, Duke of Bohemia, and banished Euphemia and her children. Instead of returning to Hungary, Euphemia stayed with her sons and took refuge under her husband's elder brother, Conrad I, Duke of Bohemia. Conrad only ruled for eight months before his death, after which the Dukedom was awarded to the late king's son, Bretislav II according Agnatic seniority. Nevertheless, the enmity with the Moravian branch of the Přemyslids increased, more so when Duke Bretislav II appointed his half-brother Bořivoj II ruler of the Moravian lands and made an application to Henry IV, Holy Roman Emperor to acknowledge Bořivoj's succession as Bohemian duke, thus starting a civil war with the sons of Conrad, Ulrich and Luitpold of Znojmo. In 1092 peace was made.

After this peace, Euphemia and her children were able to return to Olomouc where the boys received their inheritance during which Euphemia ruled as regent until 1095.

In 1099, Borivoj prevailed when the Emperor had an Imperial charter written out, and after the death of Bretislav II in 1100, Bořivoj took power.

Though, when the Emperor was deposed by his own son Henry V, Holy Roman Emperor, her eldest son, Svatopluk, took the opportunity march against Borivoj and claim the Dukedom of Bohemia which he was able to maintain due to his good relationship with Henry V.

Not much else is known about Euphemia during this period. She died in 1111, and was buried next to her husband in the Hradisko Monastery which they founded.
