= Otto I of Olomouc =

Prince of Olomouc in Moravia (1061-1087)

Otto I
- Prince of Olomouc
- Born: 1045
- Died: 9 June 1087
- Noble family: Přemyslid dynasty
- Spouse: Euphemia of Hungary
- Issue: Svatopluk, Duke of Bohemia; Otto II the Black
- Father: Bretislav I
- Mother: Judith of Schweinfurt

Otto I (1045 – 9 June 1087), known as Otto the Fair (Czech: Ota Sličný), a member of the Přemyslid dynasty, was Prince of Olomouc in Moravia from 1061 until his death.

He was the youngest son of the Bohemian duke Bretislav I and his wife Judith of Schweinfurt. After his father's death in 1055, his older brother was crowned as Duke Spytihněv II of Bohemia. Otto ruled as a Přemyslid prince in Brno, but after struggles with his brother Vratislaus of Olomouc, he took refuge in Prague. When in 1061 Spytihněv died and his brother Vratislaus was crowned duke, Otto took over the government of the Olomouc principality. Like his brothers Conrad and Bishop Jaromír of Prague, he strongly resisted against Duke Vratislaus' centralised rule.

Otto married Euphemia, a daughter of King Béla I of Hungary, before 1073. His sons were:

- Svatopluk, Duke of Bohemia (d. 1109)
- Otto II the Black (d. 1126)

== Bibliography ==
- BLÁHOVÁ, Marie; FROLÍK, Jan; PROFANTOVÁ, Naďa. Velké dějiny zemí Koruny české I. Do roku 1197. Praha; Litomyšl : Paseka, 1999. 800 s. ISBN 80-7185-265-1.
- NOVOTNÝ, Václav. České dějiny I./II. Od Břetislava I. do Přemysla I. Praha : Jan Laichter, 1913. 1214 s.
- SOMMER, Petr; TŘEŠTÍK, Dušan; ŽEMLIČKA, Josef, a kol. Přemyslovci. Budování českého státu. Praha : Nakladatelství Lidové noviny, 2009. 779 s. ISBN 978-80-7106-352-0.
- WIHODA, Martin. Morava v době knížecí 906–1197. Praha : Nakladatelství Lidové noviny, 2010. 464 s. ISBN 978-80-7106-563-0.
- ŽEMLIČKA, Josef. Čechy v době knížecí 1034–1198. Praha : Nakladatelství Lidové noviny, 2007. 712 s. ISBN 978-80-7106-905-8.
- ŽEMLIČKA, Josef. Přemyslovci. Jak žili, vládli, umírali. Praha : Nakladatelství Lidové noviny, 2005. 497 s. ISBN 80-7106-759-8.
- Wertner, Mór. (1892). Az Árpádok családi Története. Pleitz Fer. Pál Könyvnyomdája. Nagy-Becskereken. 168.
