= Svatopluk, Duke of Bohemia =

Duke of Bohemia from 1107 to 1109

Svatopluk of Olomouc
- Duke of Bohemia
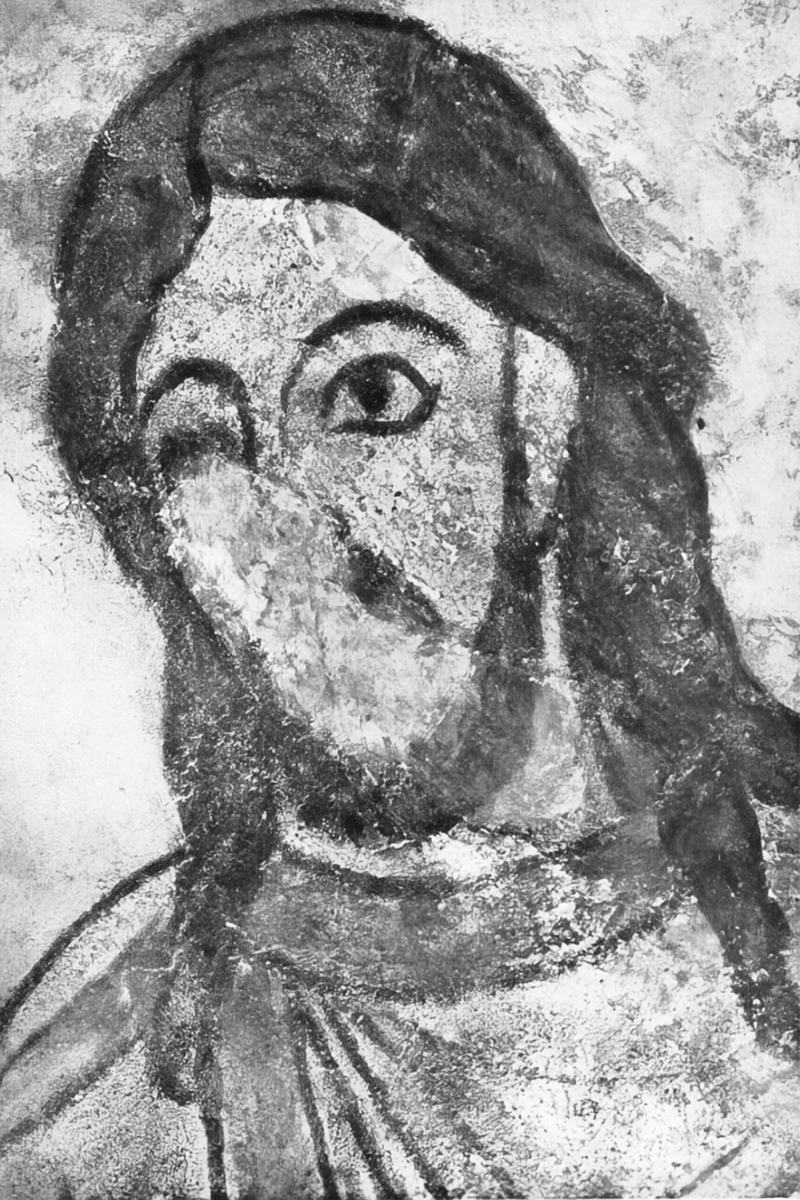
- Image of Svatopluk from a fresco in Znojmo

Duke of Bohemia
- Reign: May 1107 – 21 September 1109
- Predecessor: Bořivoj II
- Successor: Vladislaus I
- Born: c. 1075
- Died: 21 September 1109 (aged c. 35); Głogów, Kingdom of Poland
- Burial: Saint Wenceslas Cathedral, Olomouc
- Spouse: ?
- Issue: Wenceslaus Henry of Olomouc
- House: Přemyslid dynasty
- Father: Otto I of Olomouc
- Mother: Euphemia of Hungary

Svatopluk (Czech: Svatopluk Olomoucký; died 21 September 1109) was Duke of Bohemia from 1107 until his assassination in 1109. His rule was overshadowed by the fierce conflict around the Bohemian throne in the 12th century.

== Family ==
A member of the Přemyslid dynasty, he was the son of Prince Otto I of Olomouc and Euphemia, daughter of King Béla I of Hungary. His father was the son of Duke Bretislaus I of Bohemia. When Bretislaus died in 1055, the Bohemian ducal dignity first passed to his eldest son, Svatopluk's uncle Spytihněv II, and upon Spytihněv's early death in 1061, it passed to Bretislaus's second son Vratislaus II, according to the patrilineal principle of agnatic seniority.

Vratislaus, who had received the title of a Bohemian king by order of Holy Roman Emperor Henry IV in 1086, elevated Svatopluk's father Otto (the fourth son of Bretislaus I) to the rank of a prince at Olomouc in Moravia. However, when his father died the next year, young Savatopluk had to yield the inheritance claims raised by Bretislaus's third son, his uncle Conrad I, who took over the rule in the Moravian lands.

== Reign ==
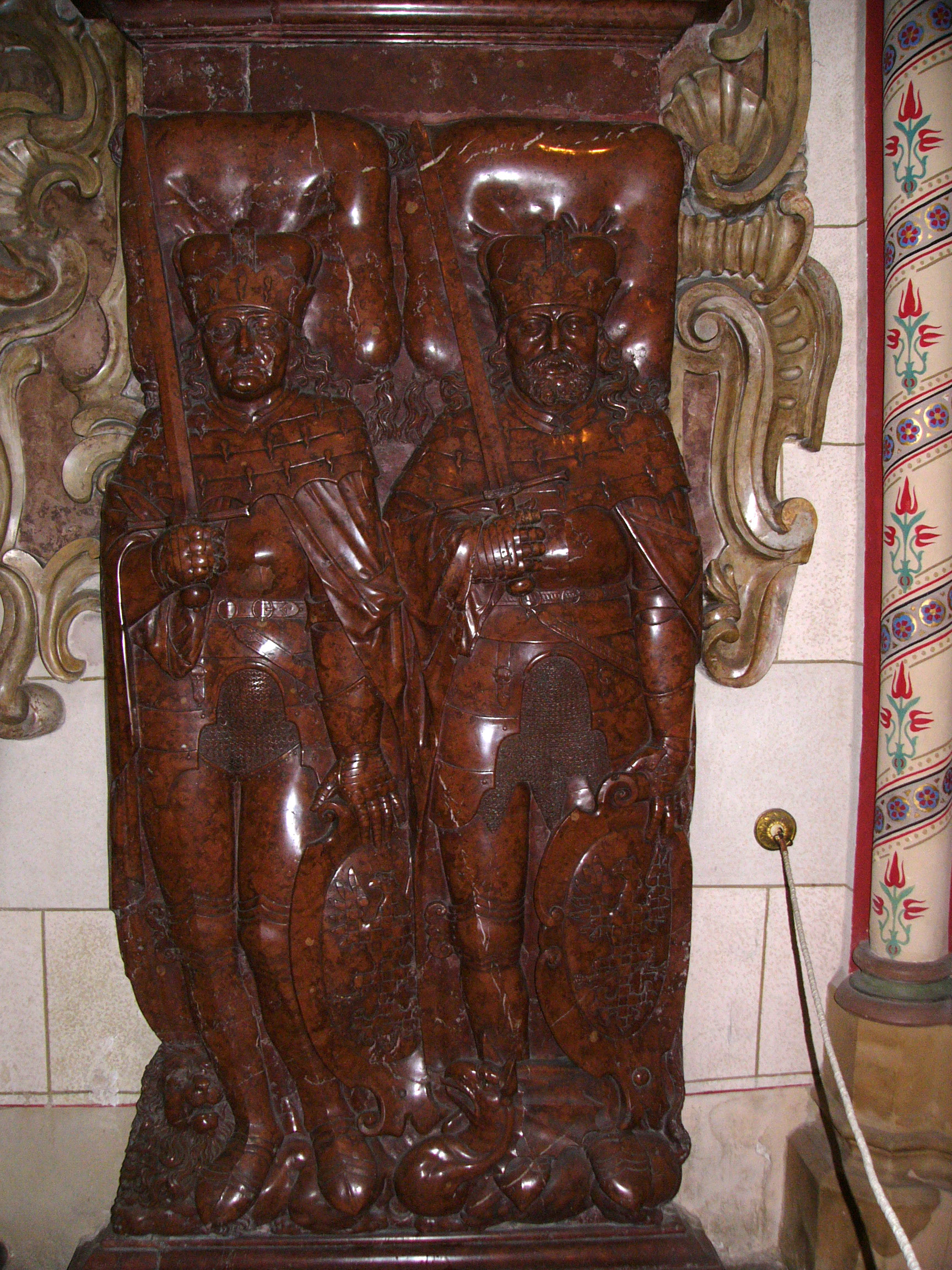
Baroque tombstone of Svatopluk and his son Wenceslaus Henry in Saint Wenceslas Cathedral, Olomouc, Czech Republic

Svatopluk himself received the title Prince of Olomouc in 1091, but again had to wait to ascend the Bohemian throne. At the death of Duke Conrad in 1092 after eight months of rule, the Bohemian throne was awarded to Bretislaus II, the son of the late King Vratislaus, according to the rules of agnatic seniority. Nevertheless, the enmity with the Moravian branch of the Přemyslids increased, more so when Duke Bretislaus II appointed his half-brother Bořivoj II ruler of the Moravian lands and made an application to Emperor Henry IV to acknowledge Bořivoj's succession as Bohemian duke, thus precipitating a civil war with the sons of his uncle Conrad I. In 1099, he prevailed when the Emperor had an Imperial charter written out, and after the death of Bretislaus II in 1100, Bořivoj took power.

Emperor Henry IV had to face the fact that his intervention had led to a state of anarchy in Bohemia. When he himself was deposed by his son King Henry V of Germany, Svatopluk took his chance, marched against Duke Bořivoj, and with the support of Bořivoj's younger brother Vladislaus was able to oust him after two years of fighting and intriguing. Henry V summoned Svatopluk, who dared not resist, and retained him captive in order to restore his liensman Bořivoj. Soon, however, he became reconciled to Svatopluk, who pledged allegiance and promised military support in the German king's campaign against King Coloman of Hungary. Savatopluk was released and could return to Bohemia. He made the king godfather of his new son, who was baptised Wenceslaus Henry (Václav Jindřich).

In 1108, Henry V intervened in Hungary on behalf of King Coloman's younger brother Duke Álmos of Nitra. Keeping his promise, Duke Svatopluk at first joined his expedition, but had to return to Bohemia, where Bořivoj had made an attack with the support of the Polish king Bolesław III Wrymouth, an ally of Coloman. The German king had to abandon the siege of Pressburg and King Coloman of Hungary was free to devastate the Moravian lands. Henry was furious and desired to avenge the Polish intervention that caused his Hungarian fiasco. On behalf of Bolesław's expelled brother Zbigniew, he invaded Poland, again with the support of Svatopluk, who led a Bohemian army across the Sudetes into Silesia to join the German forces at the Battle of Głogów. Here Svatopluk was killed on 21 September 1109 in Henry's tent by a member of the Bohemian Vršovice noble family named John, whose chief Mutina he had decapitated for the support he had given to Bořivoj.

Bořivoj was not able to succeed Svatopluk; instead the ducal dignity passed to his younger brother Vladislaus.

Regnal titles
Preceded by Bořivoj II	Duke of Bohemia; 1107–1109	Succeeded by Vladislaus I
Other offices
Preceded by Boleslaus	Duke of Olomouc; 1090–1107	Succeeded by Otto II
