= Olomouc Castle =

Castle in Czechia

- Olomoucký hrad
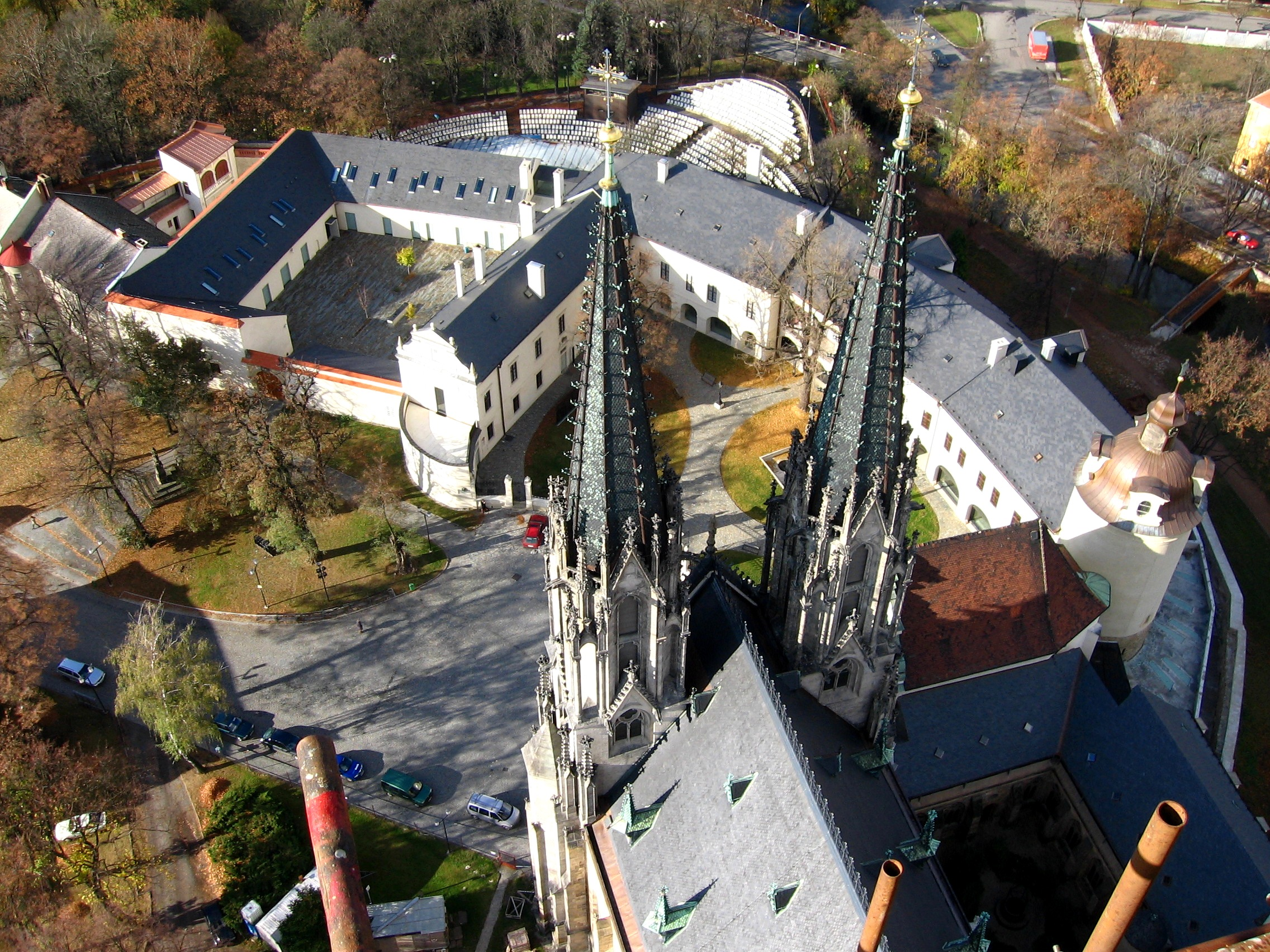
- The view from the highest tower of St. Wenceslas on Olomouc Castle
- Interactive map of the Olomouc Castle area

General information
- Type: Castle
- Location: Wenceslas Square, Olomouc, Czech Republic
- Coordinates: 49.5981°N 17.2625°E

Olomouc Castle (Czech: Olomoucký hrad) is one of the most important castle complexes in the Czech Republic. It is located on Wenceslas hill in the historic city of Olomouc.

Originally there were two castles in Olomouc called "Old" and "new". The old one was located at the site of Villa Primavesi (street Alley).

Olomouc Castle is a National Cultural Monument of Czech Republic since 1962, along with other monuments on the territory of Czechoslovakia by the Government Resolution dated March 30, 1962, no. 251/62, and Regulation of the Government dated 16 August 1995, no. 262/1995.
