= Principality of Nitra =

Former West Slavic polity

Principality of Nitra Nitrianske kniežatstvo (Slovak)
- c. 825–c. 870
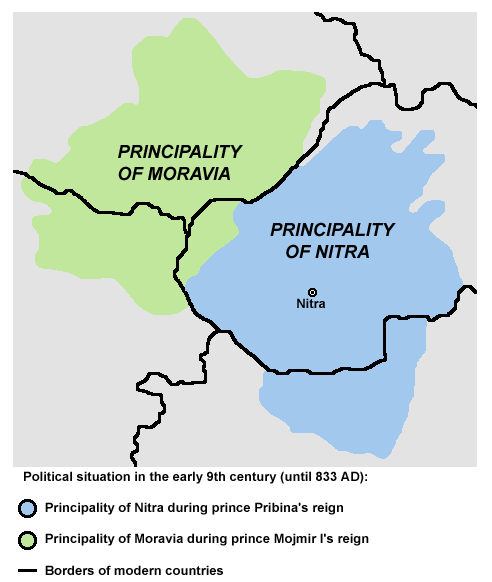
- A map presenting the theory of the co-existence of two principalities (Moravia and Nitra) before the 830s
- Status: Independent state (825-833); Vassal of the Great Moravia (833–906/907); Principality of Hungary (906/907–1000/1001); Kingdom of Poland (1001–1030); Kingdom of Hungary (1030–1108)
- Capital: Nitra
- Common languages: Late Common Slavic
- Religion: Slavic Christianity; Latin Christianity; Slavic paganism
- Prince
  - 825–833: Pribina (first)
  - 1095-1108: Álmos (last)
- Historical era: Middle Ages
  - Established: c. 825
  - Incorporated into the Great Moravia: c. 870
Preceded by
Samo's Empire
Succeeded by
Great Moravia
Kingdom of Hungary
Kingdom of Poland
- Today part of: Slovakia; Hungary

The Principality of Nitra (Slovak: Nitrianske kniežatstvo, Nitriansko, Nitrava, lit. 'Duchy of Nitra, Nitravia, Nitrava') also known as the Duchy of Nitra, was a West Slavic polity encompassing a group of settlements that developed in the 9th century around Nitra, in present-day Slovakia. Its history remains uncertain because of a lack of contemporary sources. The territory's status is subject to scholarly debate: some modern historians describe it as an independent polity that was annexed either around 833 or 870 by the Principality of Moravia, while others say that it was under the influence of the neighbouring West Slavs from Moravia from its inception.

== Background ==
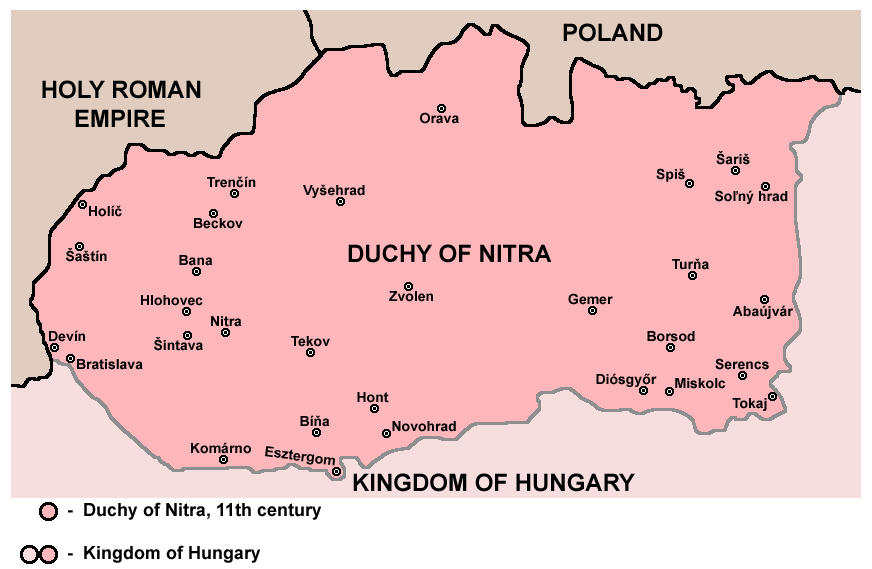
Map of the Duchy of Nitra, 11th century.

Modern-day Slovakia was dominated for centuries by Germanic peoples, including the Quadi and the Longobards, who were there until the middle of the 6th century. A new material culture characterized by handmade pottery, cremation burials and small, square, sunken huts that typically featured a corner stone oven appeared in the plains along the Middle Danube around that time. The new culture, with its "spartan and egalitarian" nature, sharply differed from the earlier archaeological cultures of Central Europe. According to Barford, a report by the Byzantine historian Procopius is the first certain reference to Early Slav groups inhabiting parts of present-day Slovakia. Procopius wrote that an exiled Lombard prince named Hildigis mustered an army, "taking with him not only those of the Lombards who had followed him, but also many of the Sclaveni" in the 540s.

The nomadic Avars, who arrived from the Eurasian steppes, invaded the Carpathian Basin and subjugated the local inhabitants in the second half of the 6th century. Thereafter, Slavic groups inhabiting areas around the core regions of the Avar Khaganate paid tribute to the Avars. The khaganate experienced a series of internal conflicts in the 630s. According to the Chronicle of Fredegar, the "Slavs who are known as Wends" rebelled against the Avars and elected a Frankish trader named Samo as their king in the early 7th century. Samo's realm, which emerged in the northern or northwestern regions of the Carpathian Basin, existed for more than three decades. It disintegrated soon after its founder's death and Avar control of the region was restored.

The Avar Khaganate collapsed around 803 as a result of several successful military campaigns launched by the Franks against it. The fall of the Khaganate contributed to the rise of new polities among the Slavs in the region. The shift in political control was accompanied by changes in military strategy and equipment. According to Curta, swords and other items of the "Blatnica-Mikulčice horizon" show "a shift from the mounted combat tactics typical of nomadic warfare to heavy cavalry equipment", and the development of a local elite in the regions to the north of the river Danube and the Great Hungarian Plain in the early 9th century.

== Sources ==
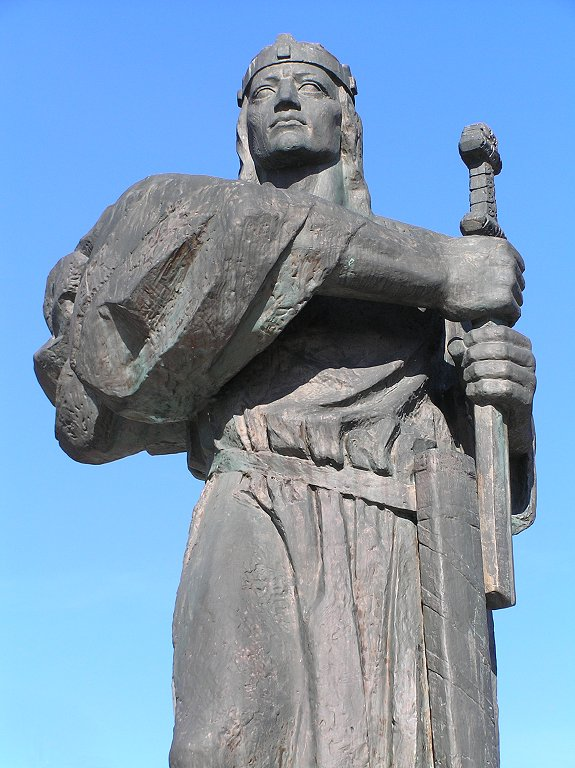
Modern sculpture of Pribina in Nitra

The remains of a 9th-century fortress covering 12 hectares (30 acres), the age of which has not been determined, were unearthed in the centre of Nitra. Beeby writes that the fortress belongs to the "Great Moravian period". According to Steinhübel, the fortress may have been named after the river Nitra, which flows below the hill upon which it stood. Archaeological research shows that a settlement inhabited by blacksmiths, goldsmiths and other artisans developed at the fortress. An extensive network of settlements emerged around it in the 9th century.

The main source of information about the polity now known as the Principality of Nitra is the Conversion of the Bavarians and Carantanians, a document compiled around 870 to promote the interests of the Archdiocese of Salzburg in Pannonia. The manuscripts state that "one Pribina", who had been "driven across the Danube by Mojmir, duke of the Moravians", fled to Radbod, Margrave of Pannonia (c. 833–856) in East Francia around 833. Radbod introduced him to King Louis the German, who ordered that Pribina should be "instructed in the faith and baptized". According to a sentence in three of the eleven extant manuscripts of the Conversion, Archbishop Adalram of Salzburg (r. 821–836) consecrated a church for Pribina "on his estate at a place over the Danube called Nitrava" at an unspecified date. Modern historians debate whether this sentence was part of the original text or was only a marginal note which was interpolated into the main text in the 12th century.

== Scholarly debates: the status and location of Pribina's Nitrava ==
According to a widely accepted interpretation of the Conversion, Pribina was initially the ruler of an independent polity which was centered on Nitra. For instance, Barford writes that Pribina "was apparently prince of Nitra". Pribina's assumed realm is described as the "first demonstrable Slavic state north of the middle Danube" by Lukačka. Lukačka also says that Pribina had a retinue and that most its members "certainly descended from the former tribal aristocracy" but some of them "could have come from the free strata of the mass of the people". Richard Marsina says that it "can hardly be unambiguously decided whether Pribina was a prince of a greater tribe or of two or three smaller joined tribes". He adds that Pribina may have belonged to the second or third generation of the heads of this polity, which emerged in the valleys of the rivers Hron, Nitra, and Váh.

Scholars who write that Pribina was an independent ruler also say that his principality was united with Moravia after he was exiled from his homeland. Kirschbaum and Steinhübel add that the forced unification of the two principalities – Mojmir's Moravia and Pribina's Nitra – under Mojmir gave rise to the empire of Great Moravia. According to Marsina, the inhabitants of Pribina's principality who "definitely were aware of their difference from the Moravian Slavs" preserved their "specific consciousness" even within Great Moravia, which contributed to the development of the common consciousness of the ancestors of the Slovak people.

Pribina was not an independent ruler, but Duke Mojmir of Moravia's lieutenant in Nitra, according to Vlasto. He says that Pribina's attempts to achieve independence led to his exile. The identification of "Nitra" with "Nitrava" is not universally accepted by scholars. Imre Boba and Charles Bowlus are among the scholars who challenged that identification. The Hungarian historian Imre Boba says, the Humanist historian Johannes Aventinus wrongly identified Nitrava (granted along with Brno and Olomouc by Louis the German, according to Aventinus) with Nitra, because Nitrava was in "Hunia or Avaria", to the south of Bavaria. He also says that the Latin term "locus Nitrava" could not refer to a city. According to his view, none of the modern names of Nitra (Slovak Nitra, Hungarian Nyitra and German Neutra) could develop from a "Nitrava" form. Boba's linguistic approach is not compliant with onomastic research which suggests that Nitra was the primary form of the place name and "Nitrava" is only the secondary name; both forms were recorded already in the 9th century. The Czech historian Dušan Třeštík, who says that the association of Nitra with Nitrava cannot be challenged, writes that the latter form developed from the name of the Nitra River, which fits well into the system of Indo-European toponyms; other rivers with similar names are not known. Charles Bowlus also rejects the identification of Nitrava with Nitra, because the latter town was only annexed by Moravia during the reign of Svatopluk, years after Pribina's expulsion, according to a letter that Archbishop Theotmar of Salzburg and his suffragans wrote around 900. According to Třeštík, the content of the letter can be explained as a reasonable mistake of its compilators who knew that the territory was in the past a separate realm different from Moravia.

== Duchy of Nitra (Kingdom of Hungary) ==
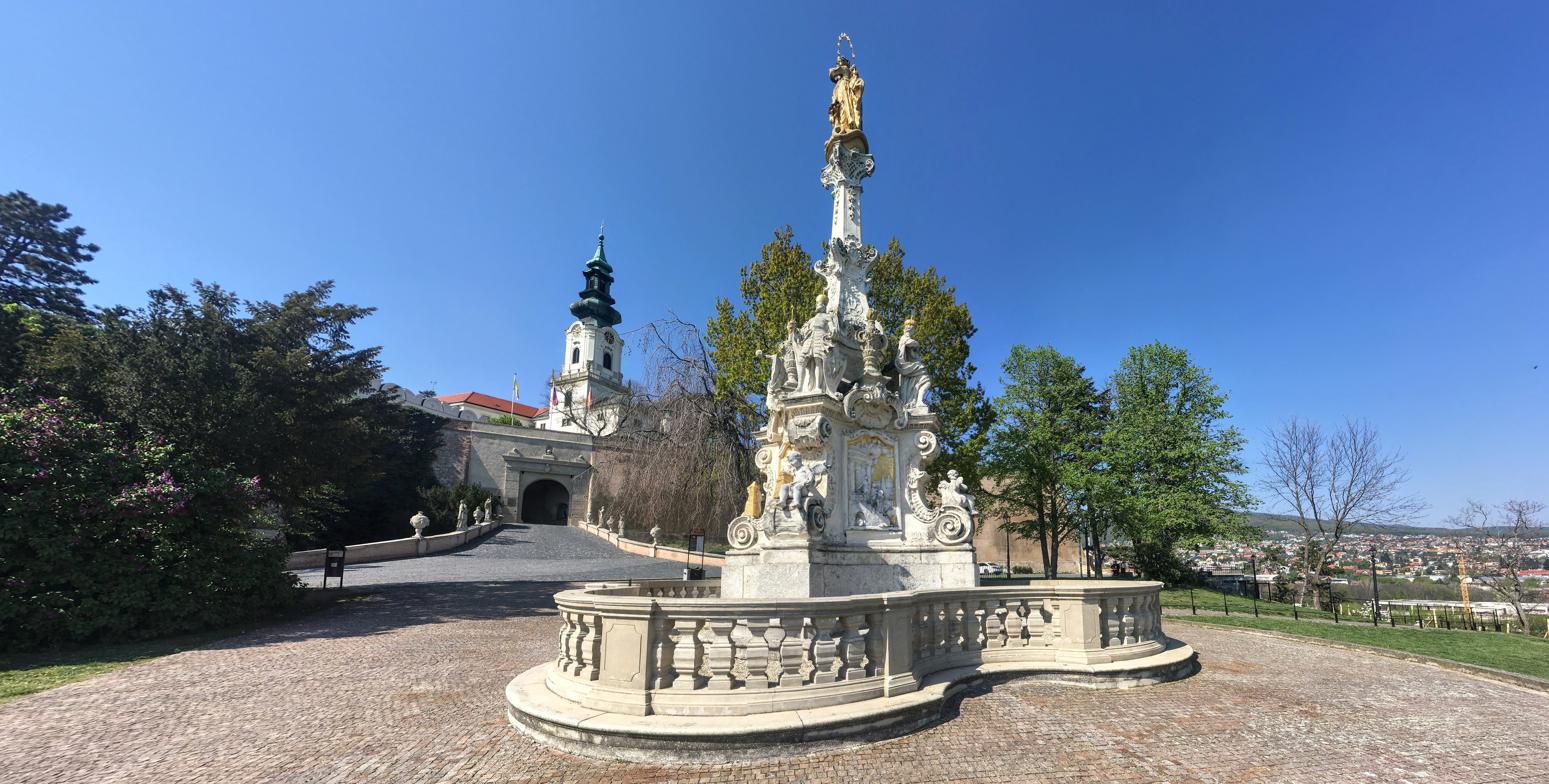
Nitra Castle - main gate

The Duchy or Ducatus is the denomination for territories occasionally governed separately by members (dukes) of the Árpád dynasty within the Kingdom of Hungary in the 11th-12th centuries. The symbol of the ducal power was a sword, while the royal power was represented by the crown. Modern historians do not share a consensual view on the origins of the Duchy or territorial units administered by members of the royal family within the medieval Kingdom of Hungary. György Györffy writes that the Ducatus or "Duchy" developed from the command over the Kabars and other ethnic groups which joined the federation of the Hungarian tribes.

According to his opinion, this command was initially, even before the Hungarian conquest of the Carpathian Basin around 895, bestowed upon the heir to the supreme head of the Hungarian tribal federation, in accordance with the customs of the Turkic peoples of the Eurasian steppes. Therefore, Györffy continues, the crown prince's command over these ethnic groups transformed, in the course of the 10th century, into his authority over the territories where they settled. On the other hand, Gyula Kristó, who rejected Györffy's theory, writes that the Duchy only came into being when King Andrew I granted one-third of his kingdom to his younger brother, Béla around 1048. He cites the Illuminated Chronicle which clearly states that this was the "first division of the kingdom".

The practise of dynastical divisions of the kingdom's territories commenced in 1048 when King Andrew I of Hungary conceded one-third of the counties of his kingdom in appanage to his brother, Béla. The territories entrusted to the members of the ruling dynasty were organized around two or three centers and the duchy made up one-third of the kingdom's territory. Béla's autonomous duchy (ducatus) extended from the Morava river to the border of Transylvania. It was composed of two parts: Nitra and neighboring Bihar, extending from the upper Tisa in the north to the Körös river in the south, from the Transylvanian borders in the east to the Tisa river in the west. Béla was a sovereign lord of his demesne. This is testified by ducal half-denarii - they had the words BELA DVX engraved on them - as well as by the previously mentioned Hungarian Chronicle. Béla probably had the coins struck at his ducal seat in Nitra and new fortifications were added to the Nitra castle. At that time, Duke Béla was the heir presumptive, but later King Andrew I fathered a son, Solomon. The birth of Solomon gave rise to conflicts between the two brothers that resulted in a civil war. The civil war stopped in 1060 when Béla defeated his brother and ascended the throne.

When Béla died in 1063, his sons Géza, Ladislaus and Lampert had to flee from the Kingdom of Hungary, because their cousin, Solomon (who had already been crowned in 1057) returned followed by the troops his brother-in-law, Henry IV, Holy Roman Emperor provided him. Shortly afterwards, King Bolesław II of Poland provided military assistance to the three dukes thus they could return to the kingdom. However, the parties wanted to avoid the emerging civil war and therefore they made an agreement on 20 January 1064 in Győr. Under the agreement, the three brothers: Géza, Ladislaus and Lampert accepted the rule of their cousin, King Solomon who conceded them their father's former duchy (the Ducatus).

Following a nine-year-long period of cooperation, conflicts arose among the king and the dukes, and the latter could expand their power over the larger part of the kingdom and the king had to flee to the western borders. In 1074, the eldest duke, Géza was proclaimed king, while King Solomon could maintain his rule only in some western counties of the kingdom. Following his ascension to the throne, King Géza confirmed his brothers, Ladislaus and Lampert in the possession of the Duchy. When Géza died on 25 April 1077, his partisans proclaimed Ladislaus king who could enforce King Solomon to accept his rule in 1081. During Ladislaus' reign, the Duchy may have governed by his brother, Duke Lampert, but it has not been proven yet.

The Ducatus was revived in 1095–1096, when King Coloman of Hungary made an agreement with his brother, Prince Álmos, who had been debating Coloman's right to the throne following the death of King Ladislaus I, and conceded the territories in appanage to him. In 1105, Duke Álmos rebelled against his brother and sought military assistance from the Holy Roman Empire and Poland, but his troops were defeated by the king shortly afterwards. In 1107, Duke Álmos made a pilgrimage to the Holy Land, and taking advantage of his absence, King Coloman occupied the territories of the Duchy.

When Duke Álmos returned from the Holy Land and realised that his territories had been incorporated into the royal domains, he escaped to the court of Henry V, Holy Roman Emperor. Upon the duke's request, the Emperor laid siege to Bratislava. However, King Coloman sought the assistance of Duke Boleslaw III of Poland, who attacked Bohemia. In November, the emperor made a peace with Coloman, who let his brother come back to his court, but the Duchy and his ducal power was not to be restored. Shortly afterwards, Coloman set up the bishopric of Nitra in one of the seats of the Ducatus.

== See also ==
- Great Moravia
- Tercia pars regni

== Sources ==
=== Primary sources ===
- Anonymus, Notary of King Béla: The Deeds of the Hungarians (Edited, Translated and Annotated by Martyn Rady and László Veszprémy) (2010). In: Rady, Martyn; Veszprémy, László; Bak, János M. (2010); Anonymus and Master Roger; CEU Press; ISBN 978-963-9776-95-1.
- Herman of Reichenau: Chronicle. In: Eleventh-century Germany: The Swabian Chronicles (selected sources translated and annotated with an introduction by I. S. Robinson) (2008); Manchester University Press; ISBN 978-0-7190-7734-0.
- Procopius: History of the Wars (Books VI.16–VII.35.) (With an English Translation by H. B. Dewing) (2006). Harvard University Press. ISBN 0-674-99191-5.
- Simon of Kéza: The Deeds of the Hungarians (Edited and translated by László Veszprémy and Frank Schaer with a study by Jenő Szűcs) (1999). CEU Press. ISBN 963-9116-31-9.
- The Annals of Fulda (Ninth-Century Histories, Volume II) (Translated and annotated by Timothy Reuter) (1992). Manchester University Press. ISBN 0-7190-3458-2.
- The Deeds of the Princes of the Poles (Translated and annotated by Paul W. Knoll and Frank Schaer with a preface by Thomas N. Bisson) (2003). CEU Press. ISBN 963-9241-40-7.
- The Hungarian Illuminated Chronicle: Chronica de Gestis Hungarorum (Edited by Dezső Dercsényi) (1970). Corvina, Taplinger Publishing. ISBN 0-8008-4015-1.

=== Secondary sources ===
- Alexander, June Granatir (2005). "Slovakia". In Frucht, Richard (ed.). Eastern Europe: An Introduction to the People, Lands and Culture. ABC Clio. pp. 283–328. ISBN 1-57607-800-0.
- Angi, János (1997). "A nyugati szláv államok [Western Slavic states]". In Pósán, László; Papp, Imre; Bárány, Attila; Orosz, István; Angi, János (eds.). Európa a korai középkorban ["Europe in the Early Middle Ages"] (in Hungarian). Multiplex Media – Debrecen University Press. pp. 358–365. ISBN 963-04-9196-6.
- Barford, P. M. (2001). The Early Slavs: Culture and Society in Early Medieval Eastern Europe. Cornell University Press. ISBN 0-8014-3977-9.
- Bartl, Július; Čičaj, Viliam; Kohútova, Mária; Letz, Róbert; Segeš, Vladimír; Škvarna, Dušan (2002). Slovak History: Chronology & Lexicon. Bolchazy-Carducci Publishers, Slovenské Pedegogické Nakladatel'stvo. ISBN 0-86516-444-4.
- Beeby, Susan; Buckton, David; Klanica, Zdeněk (1982). Great Moravia: The Archaeology of Ninth-Century Czechoslovakia. The Trustees of the British Museum. ISBN 0-7141-0520-1.
- Berend, Nora; Urbańczyk, Przemysław; Wiszewski, Przemysław (2013). Central Europe in the High Middle Ages: Bohemia, Hungary and Poland, c. 900-c. 1300. Cambridge University Press. ISBN 978-0-521-78156-5.
- Betti, Maddalena (2013). The Making of Christian Moravia (858-882): Papal Power and Political Reality. Brill. pp. 27–34. ISBN 978-9-004-26008-5.
- Boba, Imre (1993). "In Defence of Emperor Constantine Porphyrogenitus". Die Slawischen Sprachen. 32. Institut für Slawistik der Universität Salzburg.
- Bowlus, Charles R. (2009). "Nitra: when did it become a part of the Moravian realm? Evidence in the Frankish sources". Early Medieval Europe. 17 (3). Oxford (UK): Blackwell Publishing Ltd: 311–328. doi:10.1111/j.1468-0254.2009.00279.x.
- Curta, Florin (2006). Southeastern Europe in the Middle Ages, 500–1250. Cambridge University Press. ISBN 978-0-521-89452-4.
- Goldberg, Eric J. (2006). Struggle for Empire: Kingship and Conflict under Louis the German, 817–876. Cornell University Press. ISBN 978-0-8014-7529-0.
- Hladký, Juraj (2008). "Z historickej slovenskej hydronymie a ojkonymie – Nitrava či Nitra?" [From the historical slovak hydronymy and ojconymy - Nitrava or Nitra?] (PDF). Logos Onomastiky (in Slovak) (2). Donetsk National University.
- Kirschbaum, Stanislav J. (1996). A History of Slovakia: The Struggle for Survival. Palgrave Macmillan. ISBN 1-4039-6929-9.
- Kirschbaum, Stanislav J. (2007). Historical Dictionary of Slovakia (Historical Dictionaries of Europe, No. 47). The Scarecrow Press. ISBN 978-0-8108-5535-9.
- Kontler, László (2002). A History of Hungary: Millennium in Central Europe. Palgrave Macmillan. ISBN 1-4039-0317-4.
- Krajčovič, Rudolf (2005). Živé kroniky slovenských dejín skryté v názvoch obcí a miest (in Slovak). Bratislava: Literárne informačné centrum. ISBN 80-88878-99-3.
- Lukačka, Ján (2011). "The beginnings of the nobility in Slovakia". In Teich, Mikuláš; Kováč, Dušan; Brown, Martin D. (eds.). Slovakia in History. Cambridge University Press. pp. 30–37. ISBN 978-0-521-80253-6.
- Marsina, Richard (1997). "Ethnogenesis of Slovaks" (PDF). Human Affairs. 7 (1). Bratislava, SLO: Slovak Academy of Sciences, Department of Social & Biological Communication: 15–23. doi:10.1515/humaff-1997-070103.
- Püspöki Nagy, Péter (1978). "Nagymorávia fekvéséről [On the location of Great Moravia]". Valóság. XXI (11). Tudományos Ismeretterjesztő Társulat: 60–82.
- Steinhübel, Ján (2011). "The Duchy of Nitra". In Teich, Mikuláš; Kováč, Dušan; Brown, Martin D. (eds.). Slovakia in History. Cambridge University Press. pp. 15–29. ISBN 978-0-521-80253-6.
- Szőke, Béla Miklós (1994). "Pribina". In Kristó, Gyula; Engel, Pál; Makk, Ferenc (eds.). Korai magyar történeti lexikon (9–14. század) [Encyclopedia of the Early Hungarian History (9th–14th centuries)] (in Hungarian). Akadémiai Kiadó. p. 559. ISBN 963-05-6722-9.
- Třeštík, Dušan (2010). Vznik Velké Moravy. Moravané, Čechové a štřední Evropa v letech 791–871 [The Formation of Great Moravia. Moravians, Czechs and Central Europe in the years 791-871] (in Czech). Nakladatelství lidové noviny. ISBN 978-80-7422-049-4.
- Urbańczyk, Przemysław (2005). "Early State Formation in East Central Europe". In Curta, Florin (ed.). East Central & Eastern Europe in the Early Middle Ages. The University of Michigan Press. pp. 139–151. ISBN 978-0-472-11498-6.
- Vlasto, A. P. (1970). The Entry of the Slavs into Christendom: An Introduction to the Medieval History of the Slavs. Cambridge University Press. ISBN 978-0-521-10758-7.
- Závodný, Andrej (2008). "Distribúcia sufixu -ava v slovenskej hydronýmii" [Distribution of the suffix -ava in the Slovak hydronymy] (PDF). Logos Onomastiky (in Slovak) (2). Donetsk National University.
- Wolfram, Herwig (1979). Conversio Bagoariorum et Carantanorum: Das Weissbuch der Salzburger Kirche über die erfolgreiche Mission in Karantanien und Pannonien [ Conversio Bagoariorum et Carantanorum: The White Paper of the Church of Salzburg on the Successful Mission in Carinthia and Pannonia] (in German). Böhlau Quellenbücher. ISBN 978-3-205-08361-0.
