= German invasion of Hungary (1063) =

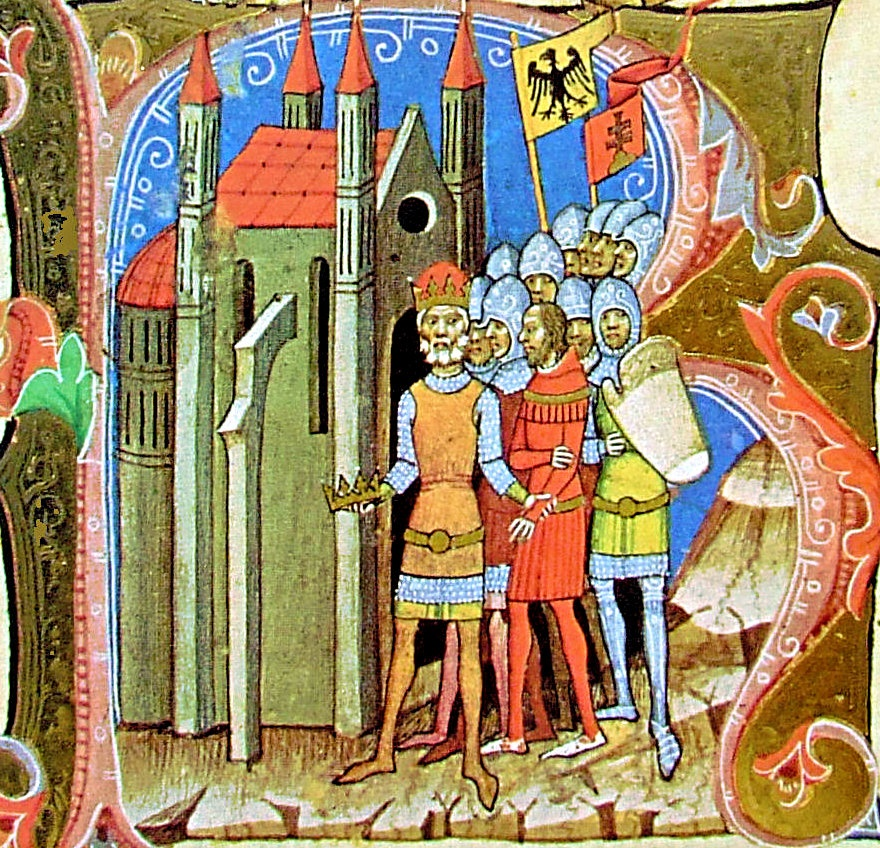
- Solomon, assisted by Henry IV of Germany, returns to Hungary, depicted anachronistically both of them by the Illuminated Chronicle
Date	August–September 1063
Location	Transdanubia, Kingdom of Hungary
Result	German victory

Belligerents
Holy Roman Empire; Duchy of Bavaria	Kingdom of Hungary

Commanders and leaders
Henry IV; Otto of Nordheim; Solomon	Béla I #

A German invasion of Hungary took place in August–September 1063, interfering in a dynastic conflict in the Kingdom of Hungary. Solomon, assisted by his brother-in-law Henry IV of Germany, decided to return to Hungary in order to his restoration to the Hungarian throne against his usurper uncle Béla I. Prior to that, Henry IV refused Béla's proposals to conclude a peace treaty with the Holy Roman Empire. German troops invaded Hungary in August 1063. Béla died in an accident unexpectedly and the German army entered Székesfehérvár. Henry installed Solomon on the throne.

== Background ==
After spending fifteen years in exile, Andrew I ascended the Hungarian throne during an extensive pagan revolt in 1046, defeating Peter Orseolo, a vassal of King Henry III of Germany. Andrew soon broke with his pagan supporters, restored Christianity and declared pagan rites illegal. He requested his younger brother Béla to return to Hungary in 1048, granting him one-third of the kingdom, with the title of duke. The two brothers closely collaborated in the subsequent years, successfully preventing the raids and invasions of the Holy Roman Empire along the western border in the early 1050s.

Andrew's son Solomon was born in 1053. The two brothers' good relationship deteriorated after King Andrew had the child Solomon crowned king in 1057 or 1058. The coronation was the consequence of the peace negotiations with the Holy Roman Empire, because the Germans did not acquiesce in a marriage between Solomon and Judith – sister of the minor Henry IV – until Solomon's right to succeed his father was declared and publicly confirmed. According to the Annales Altahenses, Béla and his eldest son Géza were absent from that meeting in September 1058, where Judith was engaged to Solomon. Thereafter Andrew I was determined to secure the throne for his son. The Illuminated Chronicle narrates that Andrew invited Béla to his manor in Várkony, where the King offered his brother a seemingly free choice between a crown and a sword (which were the symbols of the royal and ducal power, respectively). However, he had ordered that Béla be murdered if he chose the crown. Having been informed of his brother's secret plan by one of his own partisans in the royal court, Béla opted for the sword. Several historians argued the text regarding the meeting at Várkony originated in the 12th century, as kind of a retrospective justification for Béla's violent usurpation of the throne. Béla soon departed for Poland along with his partisans; he sought the assistance of Duke Boleslaus the Bold and returned with Polish reinforcements. Béla emerged the victor in the ensuing civil war, during which Andrew was mortally injured in a battle in the autumn of 1060. Béla I was crowned king on 6 December 1060, while the child Solomon and his mother fled to the Holy Roman Empire and settled in the fort of Melk. In early 1061, Anastasia traveled to Regensburg and sought assistance from Henry IV and his German court in order to recover the Hungarian throne for his minor son.

Béla I attempted to conclude a peace treaty with the Holy Roman Empire. For this purpose, shortly after his coronation, he released all German commanders – for instance, William, Margrave of Meissen – who had assisted Andrew during the civil war. However, the young German monarch's advisors refused Béla's proposals. The usurper could keep his throne for three years only because the attention of the imperial councilors under the regency of dowager queen Agnes of Poitou was drawn to the events of Italian foreign policy (the election reform of Pope Nicholas II). At the turn of 1062 and 1063, prelates Anno of Cologne then Adalbert of Bremen took over the office of regent. In the summer of 1063, an assembly of the German princes in Mainz decided to launch a military expedition against Hungary to install the young Solomon to the throne. The Annales Altahenses narrates that Béla even offered his son and heir Géza as hostage to the Germans when he was informed of the planned invasion.

== The invasion ==
When the most pious King Béla had completed the third year of his reign, he was severely injured on his royal estate at Dömös when his throne collapsed, and thus suffered from an incurable illness. On certain affairs of the kingdom they brought him half-dead to the small river Kőris, and there he departed from this world. [...] When, however, King Solomon heard of the death of King Béla, he came to his father-in-law [sic!], the emperor of the Germans [sic!], and asked him to restore to him the kingdom of Hungary. The emperor [Henry IV] gladly listened to his requests, and with the noble army of the Romans [Germans] and an illustrious retinue of imperial glory he led Solomon back into Hungary. Meanwhile Géza, King Béla's son, being prudent and wary, betook himself with his two youthful brothers [Ladislaus and Lampert] to Poland for he could not at that time stand up to the assault of Solomon and the Germans. Thus King Solomon together with the emperor entered without difficulty into Hungary, a country bereft of a king; and coming safely to the royal town of Fehérvár, he was there received by all the clergy and the people of whole Hungary with the greatest honors. The emperor then addressed the community of all the Hungarians on behalf of his son-in-law, King Solomon, and he confirmed with a sacred oath the establishment of peace between them. He made Solomon, gloriously crowned, with the consent and acclamation of all Hungary be seated upon his father's throne.

— Illuminated Chronicle

The imperial army invaded the Kingdom of Hungary in late August 1063. The German troops commanded by Otto of Nordheim, Duke of Bavaria, crossed the border sometime after 20 August 1063: Henry IV, who personally participated in the war, issued his royal charter in Erlangen on that day. It is presumable that the imperial army entered the territory of Hungary in the first days of September 1063. Historian Ágoston Ignácz considered the German army set out for Melk – where Anastasia, Solomon's mother was in exile – on their route along the river Danube towards to Hungary. On the western boundary, the Hungarians established a line of defense called gyepű in the early 11th century. Due to Hungarian assistance from Solomon's partisans, the imperial force this time easily crossed the natural frontier in a swampy area, according to the narration of the Annales Altahenses. From here the castle of Moson (present-day in Mosonmagyaróvár) in the namesake county was a two-day walk away, which was laid siege and captured by the vanguard and then the arriving main army corps.

Upon hearing the news of German invasion, Béla I was planning to abdicate in favor of his nephew if the latter restored his former ducatus, but he was seriously injured when "his throne broke beneath him" in his royal manor at Dömös. The dying king was taken to the western borders of his kingdom, where he died at the creek Kőris near the river Rabnitz (Répce) at Dévény Castle (present-day Devín, Slovakia) on 11 September 1063. Historian Péter Báling considered the narration of Béla's death as topos and allegory, comparing his death with the fate of Bishop Bruno of Würzburg. With this narration, the chronicler expressed that Béla had no legitimate claim to the Hungarian throne. It is conceivable that Béla I died in the fighting against the Germans in the western borderland. Historian Dániel Bagi argued the narration of Béla's accidental death is an allusion to the illegitim nature of his rule.

Contrary to the Annales Altahenses, Lambert of Hersfeld's Annales and the Illuminated Chronicle consider the German army invaded Hungary only after Béla's death. The imperial army marched into Central Hungary and entered Székesfehérvár without resistance, where they were given a triumphant welcome (adventus) by the secular and ecclesiastical elite. Béla's three sons – Géza, Ladislaus and Lampert – fled Hungary and sought refuge in Poland. The 10-year-old Solomon was ceremoniously "crowned king with the consent and acclamation of all Hungary" in September 1063, according to the Illuminated Chronicle, which also mentions that Henry IV "seated" Solomon "upon his father's throne", but did not require him to take an oath of fealty. As Solomon was previously crowned legitimately, the event was a combination of a "festival crowning and the Crown-wearing ritual", according to Slovak historian Dušan Zupka. Solomon's marriage with Henry IV's sister, Judith also took place on this occasion. The Annales Augustani (or "Annals of Augsburg") claims that Solomon submitted himself to the German king; all other sources refer to Solomon as an ally and not as a vassal of Henry IV.

The 13-year-old Henry IV gained his first military experience during this campaign. Therefore, the invasion proved to be an important milestone in the characterization of his rule in terms of Henry's "suitability to rule" (idoneitas) and in the narrower sense his "heroic warfare" (gesta militaria). Solomon and his mother Anastasia richly rewarded King Henry and the German military leadership. According to Lambert of Hersfeld's chronicle, Otto of Nordheim was granted a "sword of Attila" by the queen mother. Lambert narrates that a certain Liupold, one of the partisans of Otto, who had become a traitor and enemy of Henry IV by then, later accidentally killed himself with this sword in 1071. The relic, a 10th-century saber is displayed in Vienna. Bagi remained skeptical about the authenticity of the story: Lambert was considered an opponent of Henry IV during the Investiture Controversy and gifting a sword to Otto would have been a political symbol of power in the 11th century. In a short time, the imperial army decided to leave Hungary. Henry IV already issued his next known charter at the river Fischa on 27 September 1063.

== Aftermath ==
Solomon's three cousins – Géza and his brothers – returned after the German troops had been withdrawn from Hungary. They arrived with Polish reinforcements and Solomon sought refuge in the fortress of Moson at the western border of his kingdom. The Hungarian prelates led by Archbishop Desiderius began to mediate between them in order to avoid a new civil war. Solomon and his cousins eventually reached an agreement, which was signed in Győr on 20 January 1064. Géza and his brothers acknowledged Solomon as lawful king, and Solomon granted them their father's one-time ducatus. Solomon and his cousins closely cooperated in the period between 1064 and 1071, but their relationship remained distrustful and tense which led to another state of war thereafter.

== Sources ==
=== Primary sources ===
- Bak, János M.; Veszprémy, László; Kersken, Norbert (2018). Chronica de gestis Hungarorum e codice picto saec. XIV [The Illuminated Chronicle: Chronicle of the deeds of the Hungarians from the fourteenth-century illuminated codex]. Budapest: Central European University Press. ISBN 978-9-6338-6264-3.

=== Secondary sources ===
- Bagi, Dániel (2020). Divisio Regni. The territorial divisions, power struggles, and dynastic historiography of the Árpáds of 11th- and early 12th-century Hungary, with comparative studies of the Piasts of Poland and the Přemyslids of Bohemia. Arpadiana II., Research Centre for the Humanities. ISBN 978-963-416-206-3.
- Báling, Péter (2021). Az Árpád-ház hatalmi kapcsolatrendszerei. Rokonok, barátok és dinasztikus konfliktust Kelet-Közép-Európában a 11. században és a 12. század elején [The Power Relations of the Árpád Dynasty. Relatives, Friends and Dynastic Conflict in East-Central Europe in the 11th Century and Early 12th Century] (in Hungarian). Arpadiana VII., Research Centre for the Humanities. ISBN 978-963-416-246-9.
- Ignácz, Ágoston (2019). "Vér nélkül. IV. Henrik 1063. évi magyarországi hadjáratáról [Without blood. Henry IV's campaign of 1063 to Hungary]". In Bene, Krisztián; Kiss, Márton; Sarlós, István (eds.). Fejezetek a hadtörténelemből 7. A győzelem és a vereség arcai. A hadviselés és a fegyveres küzdelemtörténeti szálai (in Hungarian). Magyar Hadtudományi Társaság. pp. 77–102. ISBN 978-615-5954-02-3.
- Makk, Ferenc (1987). "Megjegyzések Salamon és I. Géza történetéhez [Remarks to the History of Solomon and Géza I]". Acta Universitatis Szegediensis. Acta Historica (in Hungarian). 84. MTA-SZTE-MOL Magyar Medievisztikai Kutatócsoport: 31–44. ISSN 0324-6965.
- Makk, Ferenc; Thoroczkay, Gábor (2006). Írott források az 1050–1116 közötti magyar történelemről [Written Sources of the Hungarian History between 1050 and 1116] (in Hungarian). Szegedi Középkorász Műhely. ISBN 978-963-482-794-8.
- Pauler, Gyula (1899). A magyar nemzet története az Árpád-házi királyok alatt, I. [The History of the Hungarian Nation during the Árpádian Kings, Vol. 1.] (in Hungarian). Athenaeum.
- Zupka, Dušan (2016). Ritual and Symbolic Communication in Medieval Hungary under the Árpád Dynasty (1000–1301). East Central and Eastern Europe in the Middle Ages, 450–1450. Vol. 39. Brill. ISBN 978-90-04-31467-2.
