= German invasion =

German invasion may refer to:

== Pre-1900s ==
- German invasion of Hungary (1063)

== World War I ==
- German invasion of Belgium (1914)
- German invasion of Luxembourg (1914)

== World War II ==
- Invasion of Poland
- German invasion of Belgium (1940)
- German invasion of Luxembourg
- German invasion of France (1940)
- German invasion of the Netherlands
- Operation Weserübung, Nazi Germany's invasion of Denmark and Norway
  - German invasion of Denmark (1940)
- German invasion of Greece
  - Battle of Crete, the invasion of Crete by German and Italian forces
- Invasion of Yugoslavia
- Operation Barbarossa, Nazi Germany's invasion of the Soviet Union
