= Agnes of Quedlinburg =

Agnes of Quedlinburg may refer to:

- Agnes I, Abbess of Quedlinburg (c. 1090–1125)
- Agnes II, Abbess of Quedlinburg (Agnes of Meissen; 1139–1203)
