= Invasion of Hungary =

Invasion of Hungary may refer to:

- German invasion of Hungary (1063)
- First Mongol invasion of Hungary (1241)
- Second Mongol invasion of Hungary (1285)
- German invasion of Hungary (1944)
- Soviet invasion of Hungary (1956)
