= Battle of the Theben Pass =

Battle in Hungary in 1060

Coordinates: 48°10′26″N 16°59′00″E

Battle of Moson
Date	Autumn 1060
Location	near Mosonmagyaróvár, Kingdom of Hungary
Result	Béla's victory: Death of Andrew I; Béla ascends the Hungarian throne; Solomon flees to the Holy Roman Empire

Belligerents
Kingdom of Hungary; Holy Roman Empire	Duchy of Hungary; Duchy of Poland

Commanders and leaders
King Andrew I (DOW); Eppo of Naumburg (surrendered); William of Meissen (surrendered); Poto the Brave (surrendered)	Duke Béla

Strength
Heavy	

The Battle of the Theben Pass, also known as the Battle of Moson, was fought in the Theben pass near Wieselburg, where the March meets the Danube, in 1060. It was a victory for the nationalist part in Hungary over that of their own pro-German king.

In 1058, Solomon, son of Andrew I of Hungary was betrothed to Judith, daughter of the Emperor Henry III. In Hungary, however, a party opposed to such close ties with Germany arose, led by Béla, Andrew's brother. A German embassy composed of Eppo, Bishop of Naumburg, and William, Margrave of Meissen, was sent to Hungary to negotiate with the national party, but this merely provoked a backlash.

In 1060, Andrew and his queen, Anastasia, attempted to flee Hungary for the March of Austria, but were trapped by Béla in the pass of Theben. Andrew was immediately taken captive, but Anastasia with her son and the royal treasure escaped to the Melk Abbey. Andrew was killed in a subsequent charge of the Hungarian cavalry, but the Margrave William and a certain Bavarian named Poto fought from sunset until sunrise so that "the deeds of the very bravest of men of former times seem small in comparison." They held out until Béla promised to spare their lives; surrender was then made. William, Poto, and the rest of the embassy were all taken captive by the Béla and expelled. Poto would henceforth be known to the world as Poto the Brave.

== Sources ==
- Thompson, James Westfall. Feudal Germany, Volume II. New York: Frederick Ungar Publishing Co., 1928.
