= Richeza of Poland, Queen of Hungary =

Queen of Hungary from 1060 to 1063

Richeza of Poland
- Richeza's coat of arms
- Born: 22 September 1013
- Died: 21 May 1075 (aged 61)
- Spouse: Béla I of Hungary
- Issue: Géza I, King of Hungary; Ladislaus I, King of Hungary; Lampert, Duke of Hungary; Sophia, Duchess of Saxony; Euphemia, Duchess of Olomouc; Helen, Queen of Croatia
- House: Piast
- Father: Mieszko II Lambert
- Mother: Richeza of Lotharingia

Richeza of Poland (22 September 1013 – 21 May 1075) was Queen of Hungary by marriage to Béla I, King of Hungary.

== Life ==
She was a daughter of King Mieszko II Lambert of Poland, and his wife, Richeza of Lotharingia, granddaughter of Emperor Otto II.

She is traditionally called Richeza, but contemporary sources do not confirm this name. Nowadays it is supposed that she was called Adelaide.

Around 1033, she was married to king Béla of Hungary, who had served her father and taken part in her father's campaigns against the pagan Pomeranian tribes.

In 1048, her husband received one third of Hungary (Tercia pars Regni) as appanage from his brother, King Andrew I of Hungary, and the couple moved to Hungary. On 6 December 1060, her husband was crowned King of Hungary after defeating his brother.

== Marriage and children ==
# Around 1033: King Béla I of Hungary (c. 1016 – 11 September 1063)

- King Géza I of Hungary (c. 1040 – 25 April 1077)
- King Ladislaus I of Hungary (c. 1040 – 29 July 1095)
- Duke Lampert of Hungary (after 1050 – c. 1095)
- Sophia (after 1050 – 18 June 1095), wife firstly of Margrave Ulrich I of Carniola, and, secondly, of Duke Magnus I of Saxony
- Euphemia (after 1050 – 2 April 1111), wife of Prince Otto I of Olomouc
- Helen of Hungary (after 1050 – c. 1091), wife of King Demetrius Zvonimir of Croatia

== Sources ==
- Kristó, Gyula - Makk, Ferenc: Az Árpád-ház uralkodói (IPC Könyvek, 1996)
- Korai Magyar Történeti Lexikon (9-14. század), főszerkesztő: Kristó, Gyula, szerkesztők: Engel, Pál és Makk, Ferenc (Akadémiai Kiadó, Budapest, 1994)
- Magyarország Történeti Kronológiája I. – A kezdetektől 1526-ig, főszerkesztő: Benda, Kálmán (Akadémiai Kiadó, Budapest, 1981)

Richeza of Poland, Queen of Hungary House of Piast
Royal titles
Preceded by Anastasia of Kiev	Queen consort of Hungary; 1060–1063	Succeeded by Judith of Swabia
