= William, Margrave of Meissen =

William
- Margrave of Meissen
- Died: 1062; Hungary
- Noble family: Counts of Weimar-Orlamünde
- Father: William III of Weimar
- Mother: Oda of Lusatia

William IV, Count of Weimar (died 1062) was Margrave of Meissen from 1046 until his death.

== Life ==
He was the eldest son of Count William III of Weimar from his second marriage with Oda, a daughter of Margrave Thietmar of the Saxon Eastern March. He became count of Weimar and Orlamünde in Thuringia upon the death of his father in 1039. William was appointed count palatine of Saxony in 1042.

When in 1046 Margrave Eckard II of Meissen died and willed his margraviate to Emperor Henry III, the emperor promptly granted it to William, who, through the second marriage of his mother Oda, also received the Thuringian estates of his stepfather Margrave Dedi II of Lusatia. Thereby, he united the territory held by late Margrave Eckard II of Meissen under his rule.

William remained a loyal supporter of the ruling Salian dynasty and, upon the death of the emperor in 1056, backed the regency of his widow Empress Agnes of Poitou. He was highly in favour with the empress, who gave him command alongside Bishop Eberhard of Naumburg, of the army in the 1060 campaign in support of King Andrew I of Hungary against his brother Béla I. According to the chronicler Lambert of Hersfeld, instead of waiting for an assisting Bohemian contingent under Duke Spytihněv II, they immediately attacked Béla's forces and the German army was soon in retreat. While King Andrew was deadly wounded, William and Bishop Eberhard were captured at the Battle of the Theben Pass near Moson (Wieselburg). However, Béla's son Géza, impressed by William's courage, induced his father to not only release him, but give him his daughter Sophia in marriage.

Meanwhile, William had returned to Germany. When in 1062 he again proceeded to Hungary to marry Sophia, however, he fell ill and died on his journey. Sophia married his nephew Margrave Ulric I of Carniola instead. The Meissen margraviate passed to William's younger brother Otto I.

== Sources ==
- ADB:Wilhelm (Graf von Weimar-Orlamünde) at German Wikisource.

William, Margrave of Meissen Counts of Weimar-Orlamünde Died: 1062
Preceded by Eckard II	Margrave of Meissen; 1046–1062	Succeeded by Otto I
