= Judith of Swabia =

Queen of Hungary from 1063 to 1074

Queen consort of Hungary
- Tenure: 1063–1074

Duchess consort of Poland
- Tenure: 1089–1102
- Born: Summer 1054; Goslar(?), Saxony, Holy Roman Empire
- Died: 14 March 1105?
- Spouse: Solomon, King of Hungary; Władysław I Herman
- Issue: Agnes I, Abbess of Quedlinburg
- House: Salian dynasty
- Father: Henry III, Holy Roman Emperor
- Mother: Agnes of Poitou

Judith of Swabia (Hungarian: Sváb Judit, Polish: Judyta Szwabska, Judyta Salicka; Summer 1054 – 14 March ca. 1105?), a member of the Salian dynasty, was the youngest daughter of Emperor Henry III from his second marriage with Agnes of Poitou. By her two marriages she was Queen of Hungary from 1063 to 1074 and Duchess of Poland from 1089 to 1102.

== Early life ==
Born probably at the Imperial Palace of Goslar, Judith was the youngest of the six children born to Emperor Henry III and Empress Agnes. Soon after her birth on 9 April 1054, Judith was betrothed to Philip, eldest son of King Henry I of France. However, after the death of Emperor Henry III on 5 October 1056, with Empress Agnes acting as regent on behalf of her minor son, King Henry IV, the engagement was broken in September 1058, when a peace treaty was concluded with King Andrew I of Hungary. Emperor Henry III had waged two unsuccessful campaigns against Hungary in 1051 and 1052, whereafter Pope Leo IX arranged an agreement. As a part of the new alliance, Judith was engaged to the Hungarian king's son Solomon at the Bavarian court in Regensburg. When King Andrew I died in 1060, his widow and sons had to take refuge in Germany. Nevertheless, with the support of his powerful brother-in-law, Solomon could recover the Hungarian throne after the death of his uncle Béla I in 1063 and soon after married with Judith in Székesfehérvár.

== Queen of Hungary ==
Judith's marriage to Solomon proved to be unsuccessful, and apparently both the king and queen had love affairs. Although it is generally believed that the union was childless, some sources state that Solomon and Judith had a daughter, Sophia, who later married Count Poppo of Berg-Schelklingen.

During the 1070s, a struggle for power commenced between King Solomon and his cousins (Geza and Ladislaus, sons of the late Béla I). On 14 March 1074 at the Battle of Mogyoród, the king's forces were decisively defeated by his cousins and their allies, the Dukes of Poland and Bohemia. Judith fled back to Germany, while Solomon continued his fight for the Hungarian throne; in 1077 he accepted the rule of his cousin King László I, who gave him in exchange extensive landholdings after his formal abdication (1081). Despite this, Solomon never gave up his pretensions and began to plot against King László I; however, his plans were discovered and he was imprisoned by the King in the Tower of Visegrád until 15 August 1083, when on the occasion of the canonization of Stephen I, the first king of Hungary, Solomon was released.

In the meantime, Judith remained in Germany and settled in her residence in Regensburg (with short breaks) from May or July 1074 until 1088. After his release, Solomon went to Germany and tried to reunite with his wife, but she refused to receive him. After a long wandering, Solomon made an alliance with Kuteshk, the leader of a Pecheneg tribe settled in the later principality of Moldavia. Between 1084-1085 he married his daughter, committing bigamy with this act.

Solomon promised to hand over parts of the kingdom of Hungary in exchange for his new father-in-law's military assistance. In 1085, Solomon led the Pecheneg troops against Hungary, but King Ladislaus I defeated them. Two years later, in 1087, Solomon took part in the Pechenegs' campaign against the Byzantine Empire and was killed in a battle near Hadrianopolis.

== Duchess of Poland ==
In 1089, Judith married Duke Władysław Herman of Poland. This union considerably benefited German-Polish relations; on the occasion of the wedding, Emperor Henry IV commissioned to St. Emmeram's Abbey in Regensburg the creation of Gospel Books to the Polish court, now kept in the library of the Wawel Cathedral chapter in Kraków. After her marriage, Judith changed her name to Sophia, perhaps to distinguish herself from Władysław I's first wife, Judith of Bohemia. Judith of Swabia's daughters with Władysław were Sophia(?) (who married Prince Yaroslav Sviatopolkovich of Vladimir-Volynia), Agnes (later abbess of Quedlinburg and Gandersheim), and the wife of a Polish lord whose name is not known. According to older historians his third daughter did not marry a Polish lord, but was Adelaide (who married Margrave Diepold III of Vohburg).

Judith probably had a big impact on Poland's political life. It is believed that she was the mistress of Sieciech, the count palatine and true governor of the country. Judith actively aided Sieciech in his schemes to take over the country; the death of Mieszko Bolesławowic under mysterious circumstances was, in all probability, caused by orders of the Count Palatine and Judith. With the help of Sieciech, Judith convinced her husband to send Władysław I's first-born son Zbigniew (who seems to be a strong candidate to the succession despite his illegitimacy) to Quedlinburg Abbey where her sister Adelaide was abbess; also, they wanted an eventual alliance with the only legitimate son of Władysław I, Bolesław Wrymouth, born from his first marriage with Judith of Bohemia.

After discovering the plans of Sieciech and Judith to take over the country, Bolesław and Zbigniew became allies. Both brothers demanded that the reigns of government should be handed over to them. Eventually, after some attempts to break the alliance between the brothers, Sieciech was defeated, deposed and exiled (ca. 1100–1101). On 4 June 1102 Duke Władysław I died. The country was divided between Bolesław III and Zbigniew.

Judith's date of death was disputed among historians and web sources. Although 14 March is stated as the correct day in almost all the known sources, in the case of the year is more difficult to ascertain. Sources established that she died between 1092–1096, but this seems improbable, because it is known that around 1105, Bolesław III entered into an agreement with her, under which, in exchange for abundant dower lands, Judith guaranteed her neutrality in the Duke's political contest with his half-brother Zbigniew. Thus, she died after that date. Gerard Labuda stated that Judith spent her last years of life in Regensburg with her (supposed) daughter Adelaide, wife of Count Dietpold III of Vohburg and Cham; since the date of the marriage between Adelaide and Count Dietpold III was ranked between 1110–1118, it is assumed that Judith died after the latter year, at a relatively advanced age. Her place of burial, Admont Abbey in Austria, apparently confirm this theory.

== Notes ==
Judith of Swabia Salian dynasty Born: Summer 1054 Died: 14 March c. 1105?
Royal titles
Preceded by Richeza of Poland	Queen consort of Hungary; 1063–1074	Succeeded by Synadene
Preceded by Judith of Bohemia	Duchess consort of Poland; 1089–1102	Succeeded by Zbyslava of Kiev
