= Ján Steinhübel =

Slovak historian (born 1957)

Ján Steinhübel CSc.
- Born: 21 May 1957 (age 68); Modra, Czechoslovakia
- Scientific career
- Fields: History
- Institutions: Institute of History of SAS

Ján Steinhübel (born 21 May 1957) is a Slovak historian who specializes in Great Moravia and in the origins of Kingdom of Hungary. He is best known for his work Nitrianske kniežatsvo ("Principality of Nitra") which summarizes his numerous studies and articles about the topic. This work was published in English in 2020.

== Selected works ==
- 1995 Veľkomoravské územie v severovýchodnom Zadunajsku [Great Moravian territory in northeastern Transdanubia]
- 2003 Krátke dejiny Slovenska [Short history of Slovakia] (co-author)
- 2004 Nitrianske kniežatstvo [Principality of Nitra]
- 2011 Kapitoly z najstarších českých dejín 531 - 1004 [Chapters of the oldest Czech history 531 - 1004]
- 2020 The Nitrian Principality: The Beginnings of Medieval Slovakia

== Awards ==
- Prize of chairman of Nitra Self-governing Region for the exceptional historical work Principality of Nitra
