= Béla I of Hungary =

King of Hungary from 1060 to 1063

Béla I
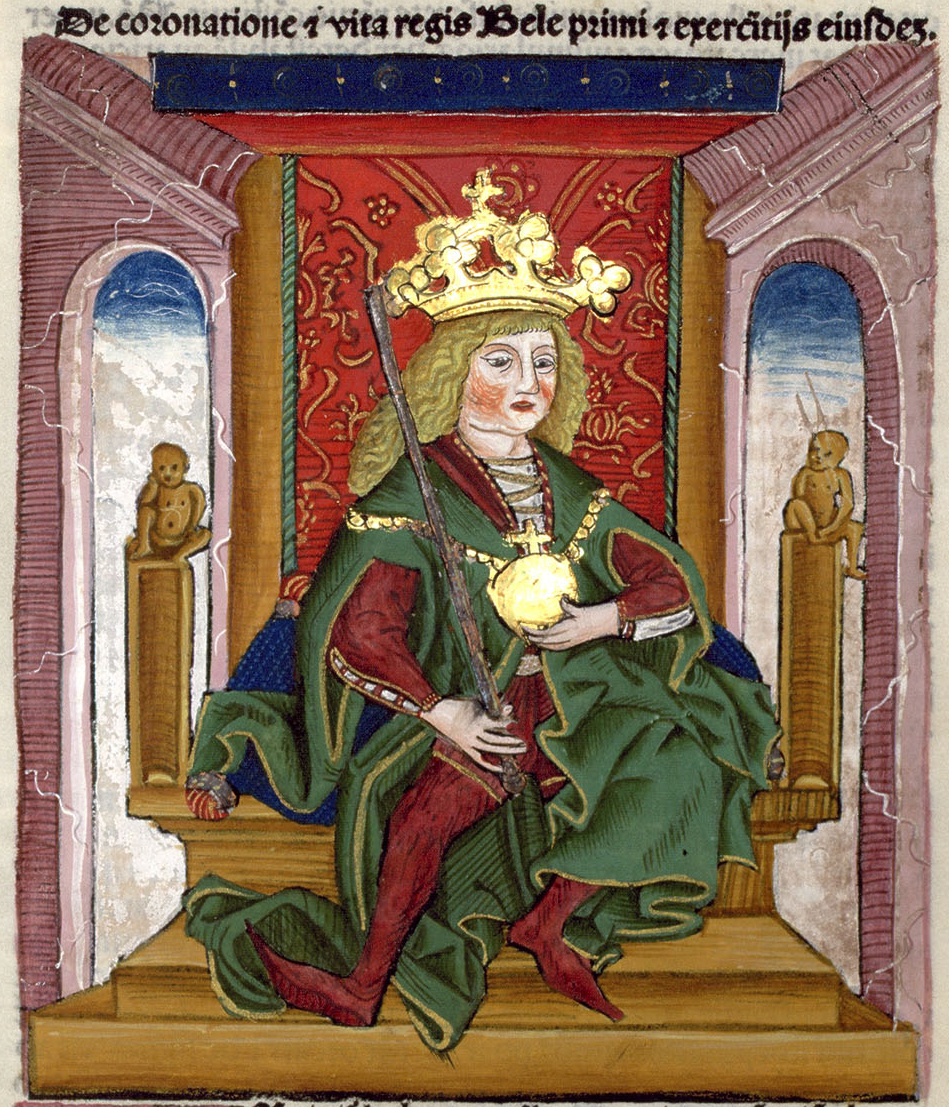
- Béla I (Chronica Hungarorum)

King of Hungary
- Reign: 6 December 1060 – 11 September 1063
- Coronation: 6 December 1060, Székesfehérvár
- Predecessor: Andrew I
- Successor: Solomon
- Born: between 1015 and 1020
- Died: 11 September 1063 (aged 44–45); At the Kanizsva Creek, Kingdom of Hungary
- Burial: Szekszárd Abbey
- Spouse: Richeza or Adelaide of Poland
- Issue: Géza I, King of Hungary; Ladislaus I, King of Hungary; Lampert, Duke of Hungary; Sophia, Duchess of Saxony; Euphemia, Duchess of Olomouc; Helena, Queen of Croatia; one or two further daughters
- Dynasty: Árpád
- Father: Vazul
- Mother: Unknown woman from Tátony kindred
- Religion: Roman Catholic

Béla I the Boxer or the Wisent (Hungarian: I. Bajnok or Bölény Béla, Slovak: Belo I.; c. 1015 – 11 September 1063) was King of Hungary from 1060 until his death. He descended from a younger branch of the Árpád dynasty. Béla's baptismal name was Adalbert. He left Hungary in 1031, together with his brothers, Levente and Andrew, after the execution of their father, Vazul. Béla settled in Poland and married Richeza (or Adelaide), daughter of Polish king Mieszko II Lambert.

He returned to his homeland upon the invitation of his brother Andrew, who had in the meantime been crowned King of Hungary. Andrew assigned the administration of the ducatus or "duchy", which encompassed around one-third of the territory of the Kingdom of Hungary, to Béla. The two brothers' relationship became tense when Andrew had his own son, Solomon, crowned king, and forced Béla to publicly confirm Solomon's right to the throne in 1057 or 1058. Béla, assisted by his Polish relatives, rebelled against his brother and dethroned him in 1060. He introduced monetary reform and subdued the last uprising aimed at the restoration of paganism in Hungary. Béla was fatally injured when his throne collapsed while he was sitting on it.

== Life ==
=== Childhood (before 1031) ===
Most Hungarian chronicles, including Simon of Kéza's Gesta Hungarorum and the Illuminated Chronicle, record that Béla's father was Ladislas the Bald, a cousin of Stephen, the first King of Hungary. However, many of the same sources add that it "is sometimes claimed" that Béla and his two brothers—Levente and Andrew—were in fact the sons of Ladislaus the Bald's brother, Vazul. The chronicles also refer to gossip claiming that the three brothers were their father's illegitimate sons, born to "a girl from the Tátony clan". Modern historians, who accept the latter reports' reliability, unanimously write that the three brothers were the sons of Vazul and his concubine.

Béla was born between 1015 and 1020. It is debated whether Béla was a second or a third son. The former view is represented, for example, by the Polish historian Wincenty Swoboda, and the latter by the Hungarian scholars Gyula Kristó and Ferenc Makk. Kristó and Makk write that Béla's name "most probably" derived from the Turkish adjective bujla ("noble"). However, the name may also be connected to the Slavic word for white (bjelij) or to the Biblical name Bela.

=== In exile (1031 – c. 1048) ===
King Stephen's only son who survived infancy, Emeric, died on 2 September 1031. Thereafter, Vazul had the strongest claim to succeed the King. However, the monarch, suspecting that Vazul inclined towards paganism, favored his own sister's son, Peter Orseolo. In order to ensure his nephew's succession, Stephen had Vazul blinded. Béla and his two brothers fled from the kingdom.

They first settled in Bohemia, but their "condition of life was poor and mean" there. They moved to Poland, where "they received a warm reception" from King Mieszko II. According to the Hungarian chronicles, Béla participated in a Polish expedition against the pagan Pomeranians and defeated their duke "in single combat". The Illuminated Chronicle narrates that the Polish monarch "praised the boldness and strength of Duke Béla and bestowed on him all the Pomeranian tribute". The King even gave his daughter—named either Richeza or Adelaide—in marriage to Béla and granted "a goodly quantity of land" to him. Makk says that Béla was not baptized until just before his marriage; his baptismal name was Adalbert.

At that time the Pomeranians refused to pay their yearly tribute to the Duke of Poland, to whom they were subject. The Duke set out to exact by force of arms the tribute due to him from the Pomeranians. Then the Pomeranians, who were pagans, and the Poles, who were Christians, agreed together that their leaders should meet each other in a duel, and if the Pomeranian fell defeated, he would render the customary tribute; and if the Pole, then he might bewail its loss. Since [the] Duke [Mieszko] and his sons shrank in fear from the duel to be fought, [Béla] presented himself before them and through an interpreter spoke thus: "If it is pleasing to you, Poles, and to the lord Duke, although I am of nobler birth than that pagan, yet I will fight for the advantage of your kingdom and for the honour of the Duke." This was pleasing both to the Pomeranians and to the Poles. When they met in combat, armed with lances, [Béla] is said to have struck the Pomeranian so manfully that he unseated him from his horse; and the Pomeranian could not move from the spot where he had fallen, and [Béla] smote him with his sword. Then the Duke of the Pomeranians confessed himself at fault; and the Pomeranians, seeing this, humbly submitted to the Duke of Poland and paid the accustomed tribute without murmuring.

— The Hungarian Illuminated Chronicle

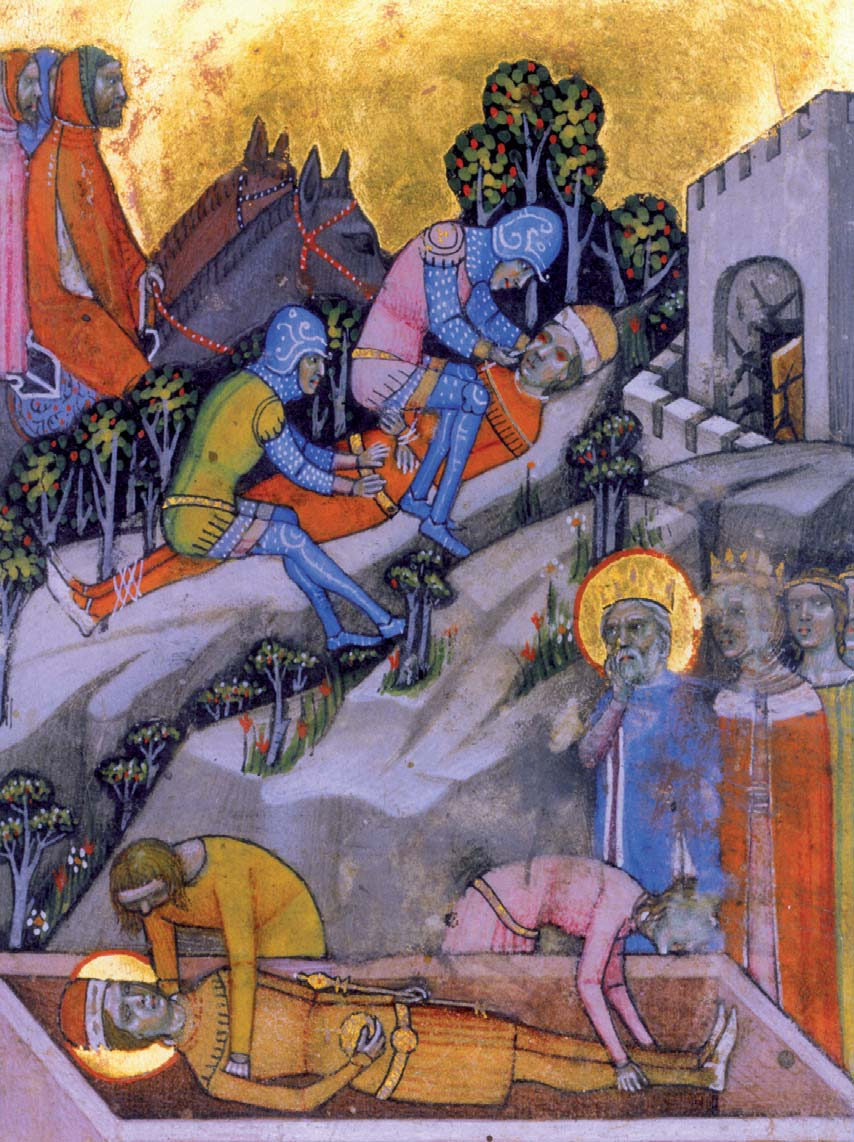
The blinding of Vazul after the death of Emeric, the only son of King Stephen I of Hungary (Chronicon Pictum, 1358)

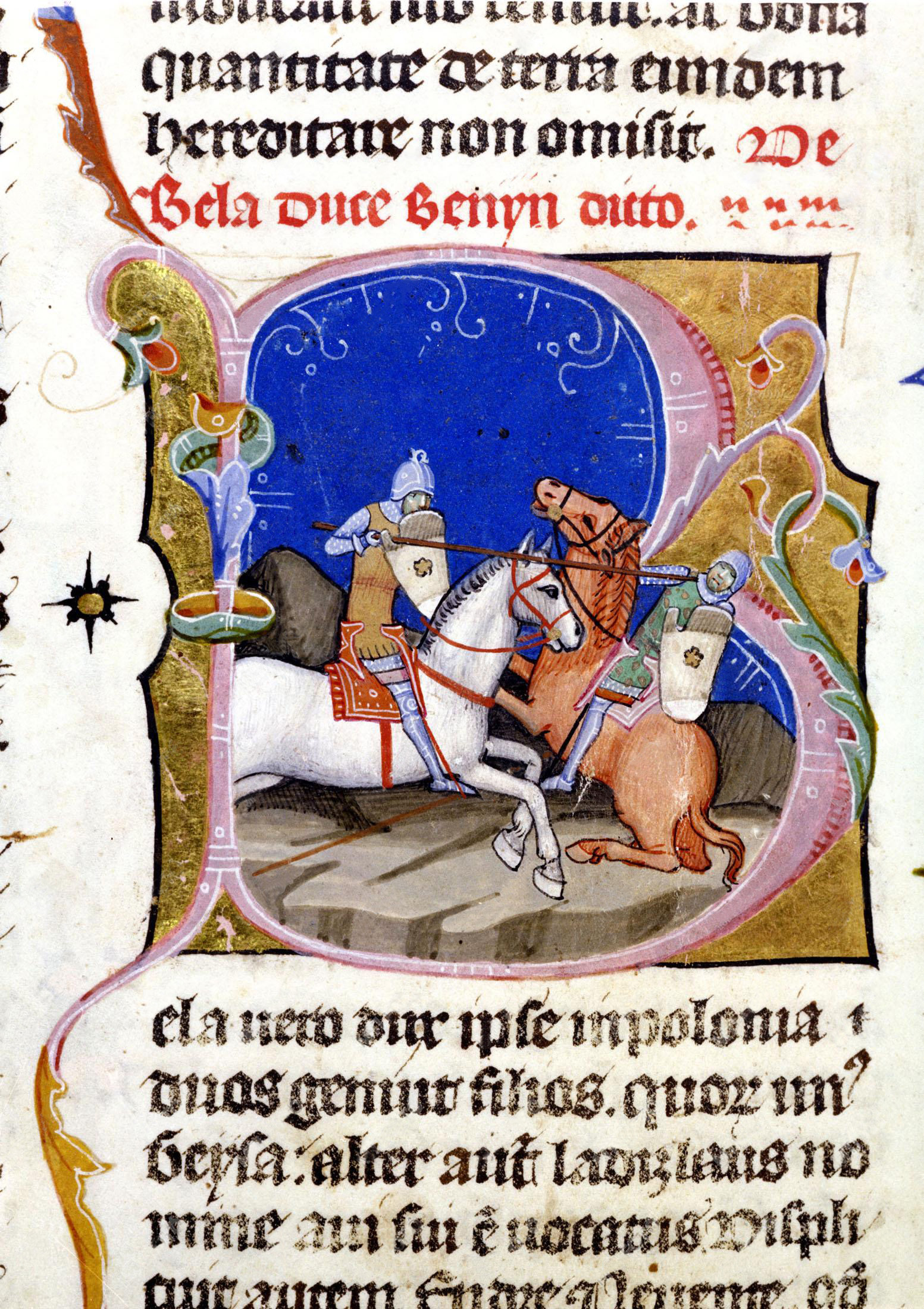
Béla's legendary duel with the Pomeranian leader in Poland (Chronicon Pictum, 1358)

King Mieszko II died in 1034; his son and heir Casimir was forced to leave Poland. A period of anarchy followed, which lasted at least until 1039 when Casimir returned. According to Kristó and Makk, Béla was staying in Poland during this period; he may even have administered the kingdom in the name of his absent brother-in-law. On the other hand, the Polish historian Manteuffel writes that Béla and his two brothers, in contrast with the unanimous report of the Hungarian chronicles, arrived in Poland only with Casimir, after 1039. It is beyond doubt that Levente and Andrew departed from Poland in about 1038, because—according to the Illuminated Chronicle—they did not want to "live the life of hangers-on in the Duke of Poland's court, regarded only as Béla's brothers".

=== Duke in Hungary (c. 1048–1060) ===
Upon leaving Poland, Andrew and Levente settled in Kiev. They returned to Hungary after a rebellion which was dominated by pagans broke out against King Peter Orseolo in 1046. The King was dethroned, and Andrew was proclaimed king. Levente died in the same year and Andrew, still childless, decided to invite Béla back to Hungary.

Having lost one brother, King Andreas sent to Poland to his other brother Bela, calling him with great love and saying: "Once we shared poverty and labour together, and now I ask you, most beloved brother, that you come to me without tarrying, so that we may be companions in joy and share in the good things of the kingdom, rejoicing in each other's presence. For I have neither heir nor brother except you. You shall be my heir, and you shall succeed me in the kingdom." Won by these words, Béla came to the King with all his family. When the King saw him, he rejoiced with a great joy, because he was fortified by his brother's strength. Then the King and his brother Bela held a council and divided the kingdom into three parts, of which two remained under the proprietorship of the royal majesty or power and the third was put under the proprietorship of the Duke. This first division of the kingdom became the seed of discord and wars between the dukes and the kings of Hungary.

— The Hungarian Illuminated Chronicle

Urged by his brother, Béla returned in 1048 and received one-third of the kingdom, with the title of duke. Béla's ducatus or "duchy" encompassed large territories along the eastern and northern borders, including the regions of Nyitra (Nitra, Slovakia) and Bihar (Biharia, Romania). He possessed a wide range of royal prerogatives, including coinage. The half-denars minted for him bore the inscription BELA DUX ("Duke Béla"). According to Steinhübel, the mid-11th-century timber and earth walls of the fortress of Nyitra were erected in Béla's reign.

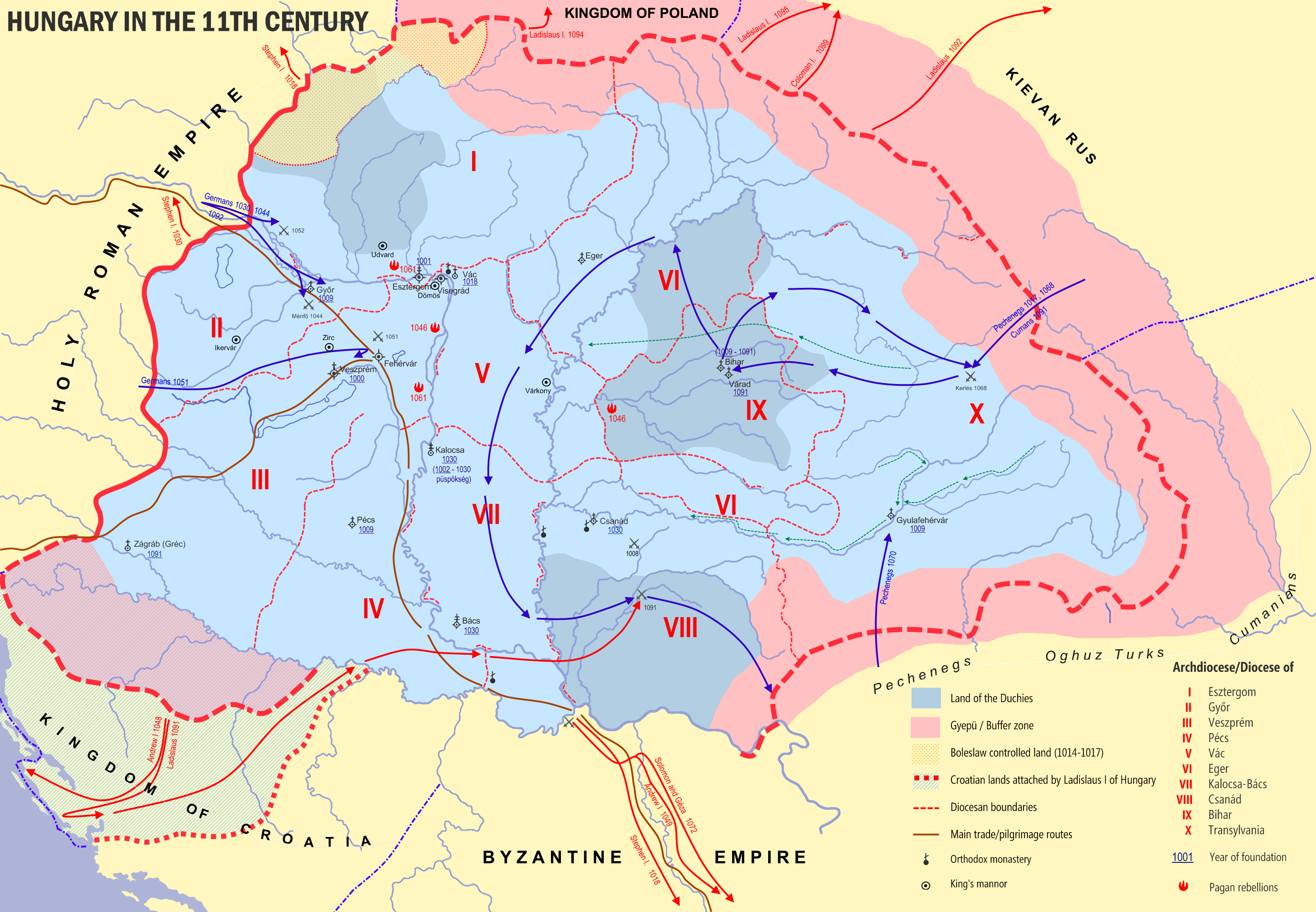
Kingdom of Hungary and the ducatus in the 11th century

The two brothers closely collaborated in the subsequent years. According to the Illuminated Chronicle, they together worked out a military strategy against the Germans, who were frequently invading the kingdom in the early 1050s. Ferenc Makk writes that Béla's epithets—the Champion or the Wisent—are connected to his fighting against the Germans. The chronicler emphasizes that Andrew and Béla "lived in a great tranquillity of peace" even after Andrew fathered a son, Solomon, in 1053. Béla was one of the lords witnessing the deed of the foundation of the Tihany Abbey, a Benedictine monastery that his brother established in 1055.

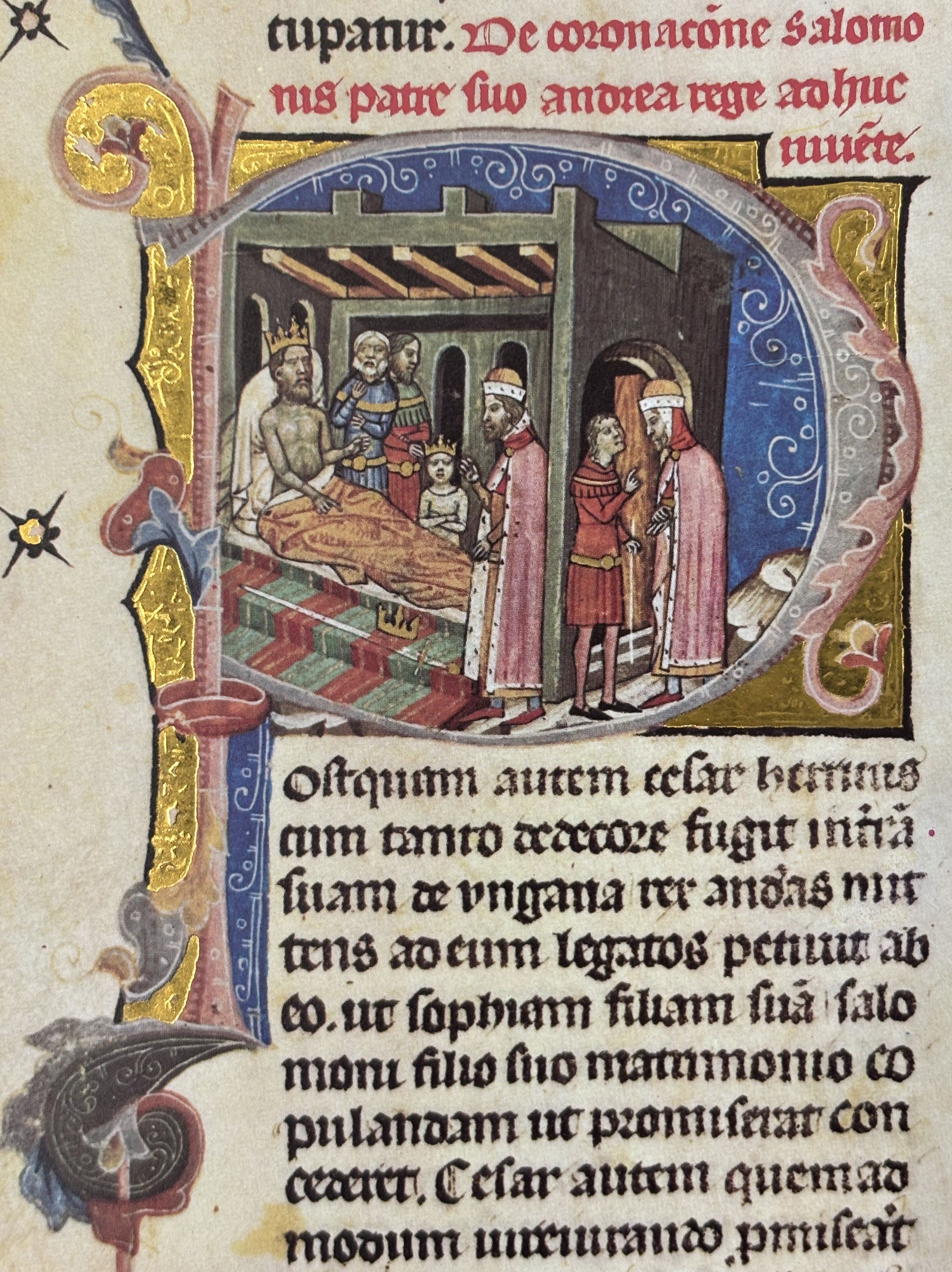
The scene at Tiszavárkony depicted in the Illuminated Chronicle: the paralyzed King Andrew forces Duke Béla to choose between the crown and the sword

The two brothers' good relationship deteriorated after King Andrew had the child Solomon crowned king in 1057 or 1058. The coronation was the consequence of the peace negotiations with the Holy Roman Empire, because the Germans did not acquiesce in a marriage between Solomon and Judith—the sister of the young German monarch, Henry IV—until Solomon's right to succeed his father was declared and publicly confirmed. Thereafter Andrew was determined to secure the throne for his son. He invited Béla to his manor in Tiszavárkony, where the King offered his brother a seemingly free choice between a crown and a sword (which were the symbols of the royal and ducal power, respectively). However, he had ordered that Béla be murdered if he chose the crown. Having been informed of his brother's secret plan by one of his own partisans in the royal court, Béla opted for the sword, but he departed for Poland after the meeting.

He returned to Hungary, in the autumn of 1060, with Polish troops that Duke Boleslaus the Bold of Poland had provided. Around the same time, German reinforcements arrived in Hungary to assist Andrew against Béla. The ensuing civil war ended with the victory of Béla, who defeated his brother in two successive battles fought at the river Tisza and at Moson. The King was seriously injured and died soon afterward. His partisans took his son, the child Solomon, to Germany.

=== Reign (1060–1063) ===
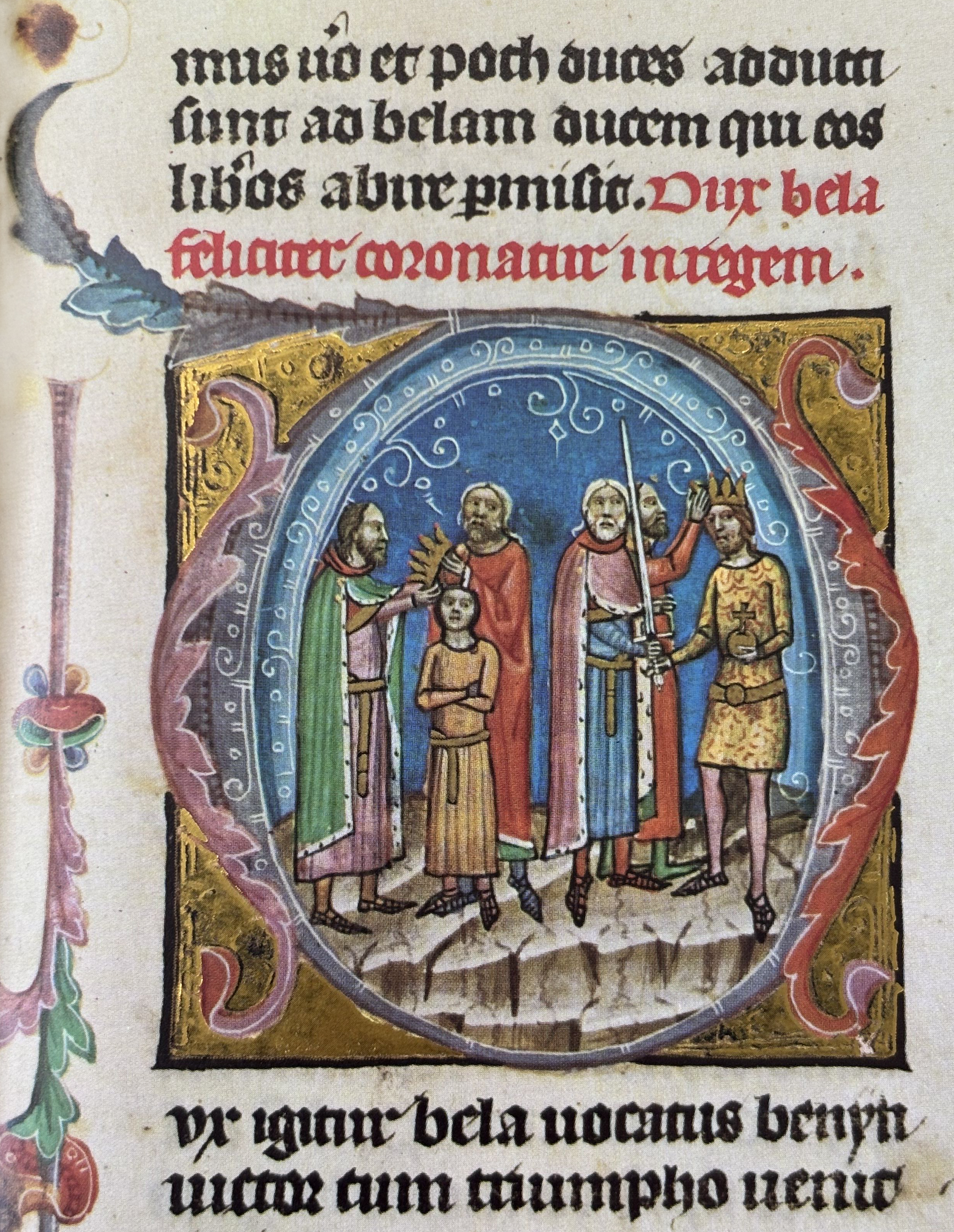
Béla is crowned king after his nephew, Solomon is deprived of the crown (from the Illuminated Chronicle)

Béla was crowned king in Székesfehérvár on 6 December 1060. He ordered that "the wives and sons and all the property of all those who had followed" his nephew to Germany "should be protected and kept safe and sound", which induced many of Solomon's partisans to reconcile themselves to Béla's rule and return to Hungary. He reformed the coinage and introduced "large coins of purest silver" into circulation. In order to stabilize the new currency, Béla maximized the prices and eliminated the black market. He also ordered that weekly markets should be held on Saturdays, instead of Sundays, in the kingdom. The historian Nora Berend says that the latter measure "may have adversely affected Jewish activities", because Jews, who observed the Sabbath, could not work on Saturdays.

Béla decided to discuss his innovations with the representatives of the freemen, and "sent heralds throughout all Hungary to summon two elders with gift of speech from each village to a royal council", according to the Illuminated Chronicle. A great crowd of commoners gathered in Székesfehérvár in 1061. They demanded the restoration of paganism and the murder of clergymen, but Béla collected his army and suppressed their uprising within three days. According to Kristó, the rebels might have been led by Vata's son, John.

Béla attempted to conclude a peace treaty with the Holy Roman Empire. For this purpose, shortly after his coronation, he released all German commanders who had assisted his brother during the civil war. However, the young German monarch's advisors refused Béla's proposals. In the summer of 1063, an assembly of the German princes decided to launch a military expedition against Hungary to restore young Solomon to the throne. Béla was planning to abdicate in favor of his nephew if the latter restored his former ducatus, but he was seriously injured when "his throne broke beneath him" in his manor at Dömös. The King—who was "half-dead", according to the Illuminated Chronicle—was taken to the western borders of his kingdom, where he died at the Kanizsva Creek on 11 September 1063. Béla was buried in the Benedictine Szekszárd Abbey, which he had set up in 1061. Following Béla's death, his three sons—Géza, Ladislaus and Lampert—sought refuge in Poland, and Solomon ascended the throne.

== Family ==
Béla married, in about 1033, a daughter of King Mieszko II Lambert of Poland. According to Makk, her name was either Richesa or Adelheid. Their eldest children, Géza and Ladislaus—who became kings of Hungary in 1074 and 1077, respectively—were born in Poland in the 1040s. Béla's third son, Lampert, was born after Béla's return to Hungary.

Lampert was followed by a daughter named Sophia, who was first married to Margrave Ulric I of Carniola, and later to Duke Magnus of Saxony. Her younger sister, Euphemia, became the wife of Duke Otto I of Olomouc. Béla's third daughter, Helena, was the wife of King Demetrius Zvonimir of Croatia. An unnamed daughter of Béla became the first wife of a Hungarian nobleman, Lampert of the Clan Hont-Pázmány. According to the historian Martin Dimnik, Béla also fathered a fifth daughter, Lanka, who was the wife of Prince Rostislav Vladimirovich of Tmutarakan.

The following family tree presents Béla's ancestry, his offspring, and some of his relatives mentioned in the article.

Taksony	a "Cuman" lady*
Géza	Michael	a Bulgarian princess**
Stephen I of Hungary	a lady of the Tátony clan	Vazul	Ladislas the Bald
Levente	Andrew I of Hungary	Anastasia of Kiev	Béla I	Richeza of Poland
Solomon, King of Hungary
(1)
Géza I of Hungary	Ladislaus I of Hungary	Lampert	Magnus of Saxony	Sophia	Ulric I of Carniola	Euphemia	Otto I of Olomouc
Kings of Hungary (from 1095)
(1)
Zvonimir of Croatia	Helena	daughter	Lampert of the Hont-Pázmány clan	Lanka***	Rostislav of Tmutarakan

*A Khazar, Pecheneg or Volga Bulgarian lady.
**Györffy writes that she may have been a member of the Bulgarian Cometopuli dynasty.
***Lanka is not mentioned as Béla I's daughter by all specialists.

== Sources ==
=== Primary sources ===
- Simon of Kéza: The Deeds of the Hungarians (Edited and translated by László Veszprémy and Frank Schaer with a study by Jenő Szűcs) (1999). CEU Press. ISBN 963-9116-31-9.
- The Hungarian Illuminated Chronicle: Chronica de Gestis Hungarorum (Edited by Dezső Dercsényi) (1970). Corvina, Taplinger Publishing. ISBN 0-8008-4015-1.

=== Secondary sources ===
- Bartl, Július; Čičaj, Viliam; Kohútova, Mária; Letz, Róbert; Segeš, Vladimír; Škvarna, Dušan (2002). Slovak History: Chronology & Lexicon. Bolchazy-Carducci Publishers, Slovenské Pedegogické Nakladatel'stvo. ISBN 0-86516-444-4.
- Berend, Nora (2001). At the Gate of Christendom: Jews, Muslims and 'Pagans' in Medieval Hungary, c. 1000–c. 1300. Cambridge University Press. ISBN 978-0-521-02720-5.
- Dimnik, Martin (1994). The Dynasty of Chernigov, 1054–1146. Pontifical Institute of Mediaeval Studies. ISBN 0-88844-116-9.
- Engel, Pál (2001). The Realm of St Stephen: A History of Medieval Hungary, 895–1526. I.B. Tauris Publishers. ISBN 1-86064-061-3.
- Kontler, László (1999). Millennium in Central Europe: A History of Hungary. Atlantisz Publishing House. ISBN 963-9165-37-9.
- Kosztolnyik, Z. J. (1981). Five Eleventh Century Hungarian Kings: Their Policies and their Relations with Rome. Columbia University Press. ISBN 0-914710-73-7.
- Kristó, Gyula; Makk, Ferenc (1996). Az Árpád-ház uralkodói [Rulers of the House of Árpád] (in Hungarian). I.P.C. Könyvek. ISBN 963-7930-97-3.
- Makk, Ferenc (1994). "Béla I". In Kristó, Gyula; Engel, Pál; Makk, Ferenc (eds.). Korai magyar történeti lexikon (9–14. század) [Encyclopedia of the Early Hungarian History (9th–14th centuries)] (in Hungarian). Akadémiai Kiadó. p. 90. ISBN 963-05-6722-9.
- Manteuffel, Tadeusz (1982). The Formation of the Polish State: The Period of Ducal Rule, 963–1194 (Translated and with an Introduction by Andrew Gorski). Wayne State University Press. ISBN 0-8143-1682-4.
- Steinhübel, Ján (2011). "The Duchy of Nitra". In Teich, Mikuláš; Kováč, Dušan; Brown, Martin D. (eds.). Slovakia in History. Cambridge University Press. pp. 15–29. ISBN 978-0-521-80253-6.
- Swoboda, Wincenty (1982). "Bela I". In Kowalenko, Władysław; Stieber, Zdzisław; Labuda, Gerard (eds.). Słownik starożytności słowiańskich: encyklopedyczny zarys kultury słowian od czasów najdawniejszych do schyłku wieku XII. Y-Ż; Suplement A-C. [Dictionary of the Ancient Slavs: An Encyclopedic Outline of the Slavic Culture from the Earliest Times till the End of the 12th Century] (in Polish). Nauk. p. 425. ISBN 978-83-04-02070-2.
- Veszprémy, László (1994). "Vazul". In Kristó, Gyula; Engel, Pál; Makk, Ferenc (eds.). Korai magyar történeti lexikon (9–14. század) [Encyclopedia of the Early Hungarian History (9th–14th centuries)] (in Hungarian). Akadémiai Kiadó. pp. 721–722. ISBN 963-05-6722-9.

Béla I of Hungary House of Árpád Born: c. 1016 Died: 11 September 1063
Regnal titles
Preceded by Andrew I	King of Hungary; 1060–1063	Succeeded by Solomon
