= Agnes I, Abbess of Quedlinburg =

Princess-Abbess of Quedlinburg (c.1090–1125)

Agnes I
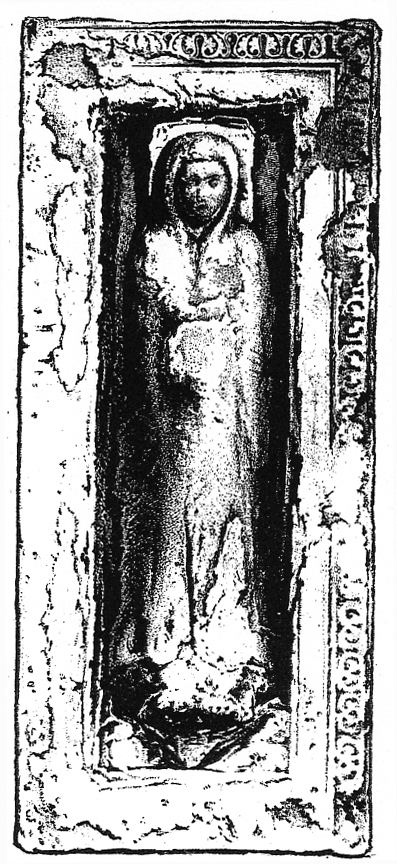

Princess-Abbess of Quedlinburg
- Reign: 1110–29 December 1125
- Predecessor: Eilica
- Successor: Gerburg
- Born: c. 1090
- Died: 29 December 1125; Quedlinburg
- House: Piast
- Father: Władysław I Herman
- Mother: Judith of Swabia

Agnes I (c. 1090 – 29 December 1125) was Abbess of Gandersheim and Quedlinburg.

She was the second daughter of Judith of Swabia and Władysław I Herman, Duke of Poland. She was the granddaughter of Henry III, Holy Roman Emperor. Agnes became abbess at Gandersheim Abbey, the place of several famous women, such as Hroswitha of Gandersheim, recorded by Conrad Celtes.

She was Princess-Abbess of Quedlinburg from 1110 until 1125. She was excommunicated by Pope Calixtus II for her loyalty to her maternal cousin, Henry V, the King of the Romans, in 1119. During the brief period of excommunication she had to leave Quedlinburg, yet she returned shortly thereafter. During her tenure she oversaw the rebuilding of the convent church.

She died in Quedlinburg.

Regnal titles
Preceded by Eilica	Princess-Abbess of Quedlinburg; 1110–1125	Succeeded by Gerburg
