= Tiszavárkony =

- Village
- Coat of arms

- Location within Hungary
- Coordinates: 47°3′54″N 20°10′41″E
- Country: Hungary
- County: Jász-Nagykun-Szolnok
- District: Szolnok

Area
  - Total: 35.62 km^{2} (13.75 sq mi)

Population (2015)
  - Total: 1,518
  - Density: 42.6/km^{2} (110/sq mi)
- Time zone: UTC+1 (CET)
  - Summer (DST): UTC+2 (CEST)
- Postal code: 5092
- Area code(s): (+36) 56

Tiszavárkony is a village in Jász-Nagykun-Szolnok county, in the Northern Great Plain region of central Hungary.

== Geography ==
It covers an area of 35.62 km^{2} (14 sq mi) and has a population of 1518 people (2015).
