= Lampert of Hungary =

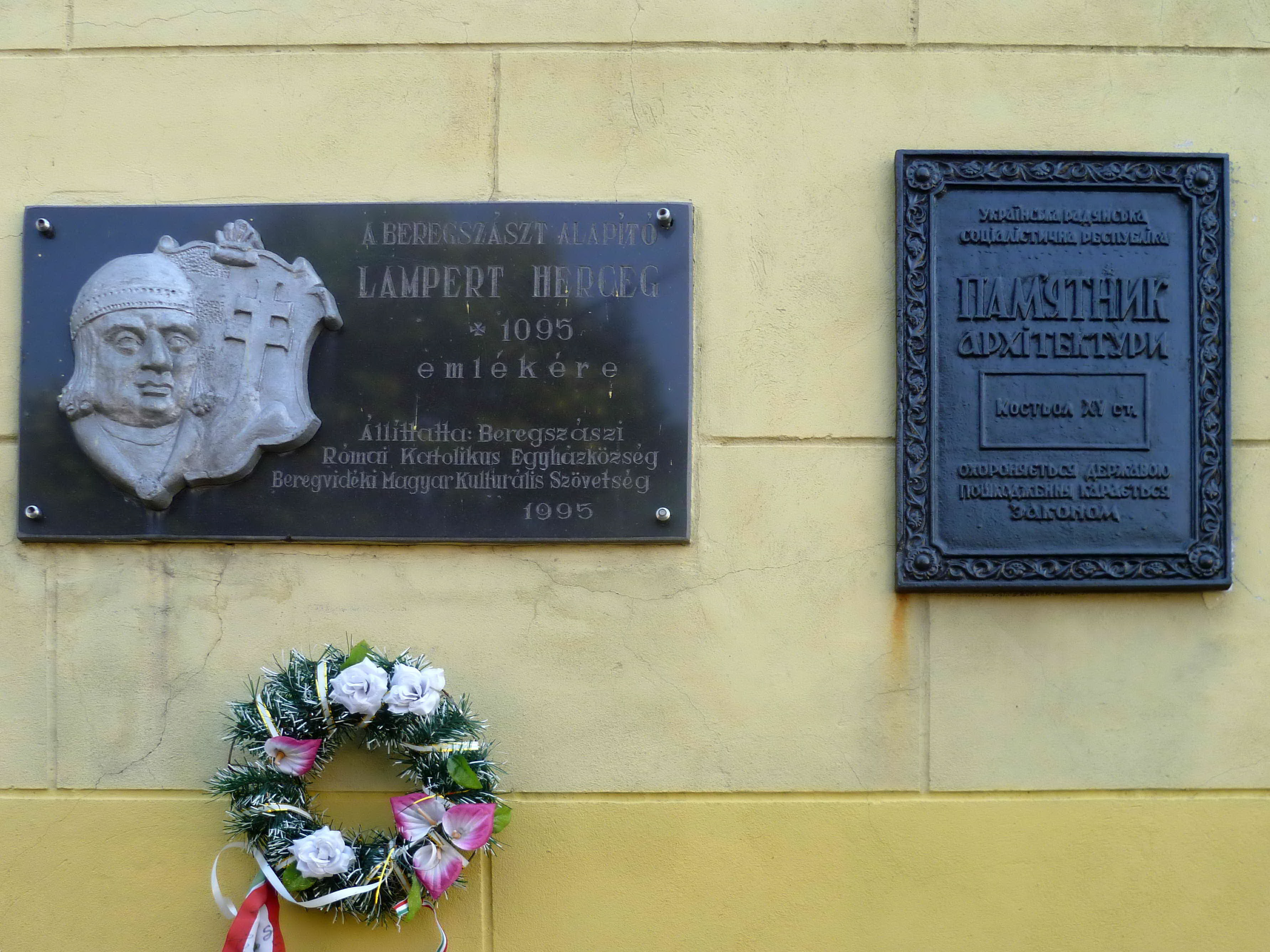

Lampert (died c.1096) was a member of the Árpád dynasty; Duke of one-third of the Kingdom of Hungary.

Lampert was the third son of the future King Béla I of Hungary and his Polish wife. He was born in Hungary when his father had already returned from Poland and had already received the Tercia pars regni in appanage from his brother, King Andrew I of Hungary.

Following the death of King Béla I (11 September 1063), Lampert and his elder brothers (Géza and Ladislaus) fled to Poland from their cousin, King Solomon, who had returned to the kingdom with the military assistance of the Emperor Henry IV. When the German armies left the kingdom shortly afterwards, the three brothers returned followed by the troops King Bolesław II, their maternal cousin, provided them. The parties, however, wanted to avoid the civil war; therefore they accepted the mediation services of the bishops, and they made an agreement (20 January 1064) in Győr. Under the agreement, Lampert and his brothers accepted King Solomon's rule, and they received their father's former duchy, i.e., the Tercia pars regni.

In the next years, the three dukes collaborated successfully with King Solomon, but afterwards new conflicts emerged among them. The three dukes rebelled against the king and the eldest of them, Géza, was proclaimed king following their victory over Solomon's troops (14 March 1074). When King Géza I died (25 April 1077) his brother, Ladislaus, ascended the throne.

During his brothers' reign, Lampert probably continued to govern the duchy or only its parts centered on Bihar (today Biharea in Romania). He invited Saxon settlers to his province and founded Lampertszász that became the nucleus of the future Beregszász (today Berehove in Ukraine). Lampert founded the a monastery for the White Canons in Titel (today in Serbia).

== Sources ==
- Kristó, Gyula (editor): Korai Magyar Történeti Lexikon – 9–14. század (Encyclopedia of the Early Hungarian History – 9–14th centuries); Akadémiai Kiadó, 1994, Budapest; ISBN 963-05-6722-9.

== See also ==
- Tercia pars regni
