= Duchy (Kingdom of Hungary) =

The Duchy or Ducatus (Hungarian: dukátus or hercegség) is the denomination for territories occasionally governed separately by members (dukes) of the Árpád dynasty within the Kingdom of Hungary in the 11th-12th centuries. The symbol of the ducal power was a sword, while the royal power was represented by the crown.

== Origins ==
Modern historians do not share a consensual view on the origins of the Duchy or territorial units administered by members of the royal family within the medieval Kingdom of Hungary. György Györffy writes that the Ducatus or "Duchy" developed from the command over the Kabars and other ethnic groups which joined the federation of the Hungarian tribes. According to his opinion, this command was initially, even before the Hungarian conquest of the Carpathian Basin around 895, bestowed upon the heir to the supreme head of the Hungarian tribal federation, in accordance with the customs of the Turkic peoples of the Eurasian steppes. Therefore, Györffy continues, the crown prince's command over these ethnic groups transformed, in the course of the 10th century, into his authority over the territories where they settled. Tringli says that it is possible that Koppány's domains in Transdanubia and Saint Emeric's territories (he bore the title of Duke of Russians) were duchies too in accordance with steppe tradition. On the other hand, Gyula Kristó, who rejected Györffy's theory, writes that the Duchy only came into being when King Andrew I of Hungary granted one third of his kingdom to his younger brother, Béla around 1048. He cites the Illuminated Chronicle which clearly states that this was the "first division of the kingdom".

Clifford Rogers argues that possession of the Duchy owes its roots to the tradition of senioratus. The dukes regarded the control of the duchy as a pathway to the throne.

== Territories ==
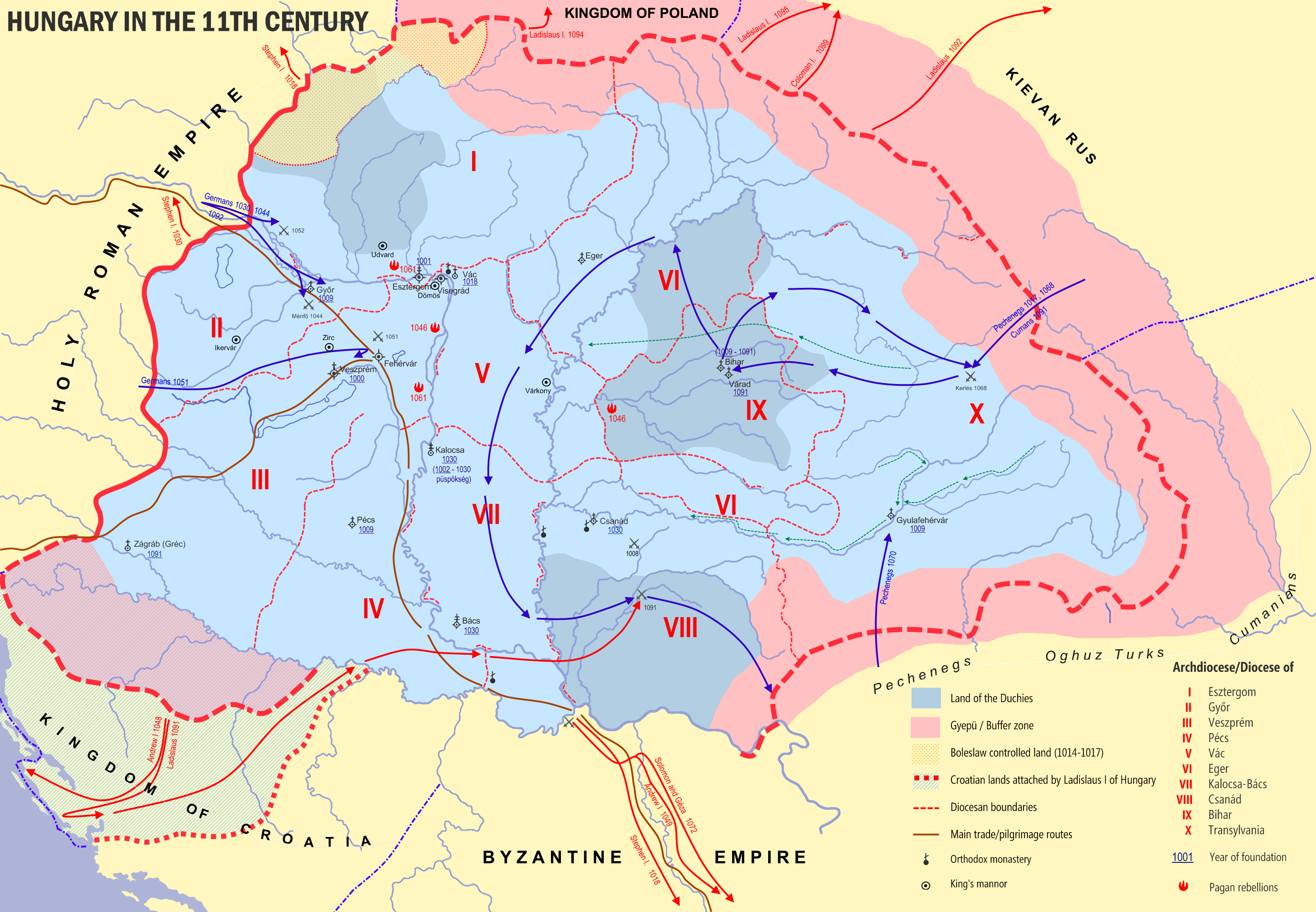
Hungary in 1102 - Ducatus (Tercia pars regni) in darker blue

The exact borders of the Duchy have not been determined yet. The counties entrusted to the members of the ruling dynasty did not form a separate province within the kingdom, but they were organized around two or three centers. The duchy made up one-third of the kingdom's territory.

The eastern block of the counties were located around Bihar (Romanian: Biharea), a city that was also the see of a Roman Catholic diocese in that time. The north-western parts of the territories were centered around Nyitra (German: Neutra, Slovak: Nitra). A third possible center of the territories was Krassó, a fortress destroyed later in the first half of the 13th century, located near to the present-day Dupljaja in Serbia.

The dukes' principal hunting-grounds lay in the "Holy Forest" (Igyfon) on the territory of the Apuseni Mountains (today in Romania) in the 11th century.

== Dukes ==
The list of the members of the Árpád dynasty who were dukes of the Ducatus ("Tercia pars regni") follows:

- Béla the Champion / the Bison (1048–1060)
- Géza (1064–1074)
- Saint Ladislaus (1064–1077)
- Lampert (1064- cca. 1095)
- Álmos (1095/1096-1107)
- Stephen (1162–1163)

== See also ==
- Principality of Nitra

== Sources ==
- Bagi, Dániel (2020). Divisio Regni. The territorial divisions, power struggles, and dynastic historiography of the Árpáds of 11th- and early 12th-century Hungary, with comparative studies of the Piasts of Poland and the Přemyslids of Bohemia. Arpadiana II., Research Centre for the Humanities. ISBN 978-963-416-206-3.
- Györffy, György (1994). King Saint Stephen of Hungary. Atlantic Research and Publications. ISBN 0-88033-300-6.
- Kristó, Gyula (1974). A XI. századi hercegség története Magyarországon [=A History of the 11th-century Ducatus in Hungary] (in Hungarian). Akadémiai Kiadó. ISBN 963-05-0398-0.
- Kristó, Gyula; Makk, Ferenc (1996). Az Árpád-ház uralkodói [=Rulers of the House of Árpád] (in Hungarian). I.P.C. Könyvek. ISBN 963-7930-97-3.
- Makk, Ferenc (1989). The Árpáds and the Comneni: Political Relations between Hungary and Byzantium in the 12th century. Akadémiai Kiadó. ISBN 963-05-5268-X.
- Makk, Ferenc (1994). "hercegség". In Kristó, Gyula; Engel, Pál; Makk, Ferenc (eds.). Korai magyar történeti lexikon (9–14. század) [=Encyclopedia of the Early Hungarian History (9th–14th centuries)] (in Hungarian). Akadémiai Kiadó. p. 261. ISBN 963-05-6722-9.
- Mikuš, Joseph A. (1995). Slovakia: A Political and Constitutional History with Documents. Academic Press. ISBN 80-967366-0-4.
- Stephenson, Paul (2000). Byzantium's Balkan Frontier: A Political Study of the Northern Balkans, 900–1204. Cambridge University Press. ISBN 978-0-521-02756-4.
- Rogers, Cliff (2010). The Oxford Encyclopedia of Medieval Warfare and Military Technology, Volume 1. Oxford University Press. ISBN 978-0-19-533403-6.
- The Hungarian Illuminated Chronicle: Chronica de Gestis Hungarorum (Edited by Dezső Dercsényi) (1970). Corvina, Taplinger Publishing. ISBN 0-8008-4015-1.
