= History of Slovakia =

The history of Slovakia spans from prehistoric settlements to the modern Slovak Republic. Situated in Central Europe, the region’s earliest evidence of human habitation dates to the Palaeolithic era, with significant Neolithic and Bronze Age cultures. By the Iron Age, Celtic tribes like the Boii established settlements, later displaced by Germanic and Slavic migrations. The Slavs arrived in the 5th–6th centuries, forming the basis of Slavic states like Great Moravia (9th century), which adopted Christianity through Cyrillo-Methodian missionary activity.

Following Great Moravia’s collapse, the territory became part of the Kingdom of Hungary, enduring Mongol invasions and later Ottoman Wars that split Hungary into three parts. Much of present-day territory of Slovakia resisted Ottoman conquest and became a province of the Habsburg monarchy. The 19th century saw the rise of Slovak nationalism, fueled by figures like Ľudovít Štúr, who codified modern Slovak, and movements advocating autonomy within Austria-Hungary.

Slovakia joined the Czechs to form Czechoslovakia after World War I, though tensions between Czechs and Slovaks persisted. During World War II, Slovakia became a Nazi-aligned puppet state under Jozef Tiso. Post-war, it was reintegrated into Czechoslovakia, which fell under Communist rule in 1948. The Prague Spring of 1968 briefly liberalized politics until the Warsaw Pact invasion of Czechoslovakia. After the Velvet Revolution of 1989, Slovakia peacefully transitioned to democracy, culminating in its independence on 1 January 1993. Since then, it has developed a modern market economy and joined NATO and the European Union in 2004.

== Prehistory ==
Discovery of ancient tools made by the Clactonian technique near Nové Mesto nad Váhom attests that Slovakia's territory was inhabited in the Palaeolithic. Other prehistoric discoveries include the Middle Palaeolithic stone tools found near Bojnice, and a Neanderthal discovery at a site near Gánovce. The Gravettian culture was present principally in the river valleys of Nitra, Hron, Ipeľ, Váh and as far as the city of Žilina, and near the foot of the Vihorlat, Inovec, and Tribeč mountains, as well as in the Myjava Mountains. The best known artifact is the Venus of Moravany from Moravany nad Váhom.

Neolithic habitation was found in Želiezovce, Gemer, and the Bukové hory massif, the Domica cave, and at Nitriansky Hrádok. The Bronze Age was marked by the Unetice, Mad'arovce, Tumulus, Čaka, Velatice, and Lusatian cultures, followed by the Calenderberg culture and the Hallstatt culture in the early Iron Age.

== Antiquity ==
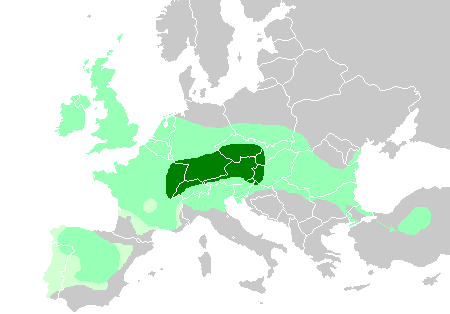
The spread of archaeological cultures associated with the Celts in Europe: core Hallstatt territory, by the 6th century BC maximal Celtic expansion, by the 3rd century BC Lusitanian and Vettones' area where Celtic presence has been proposed by Koch and Cunliffe

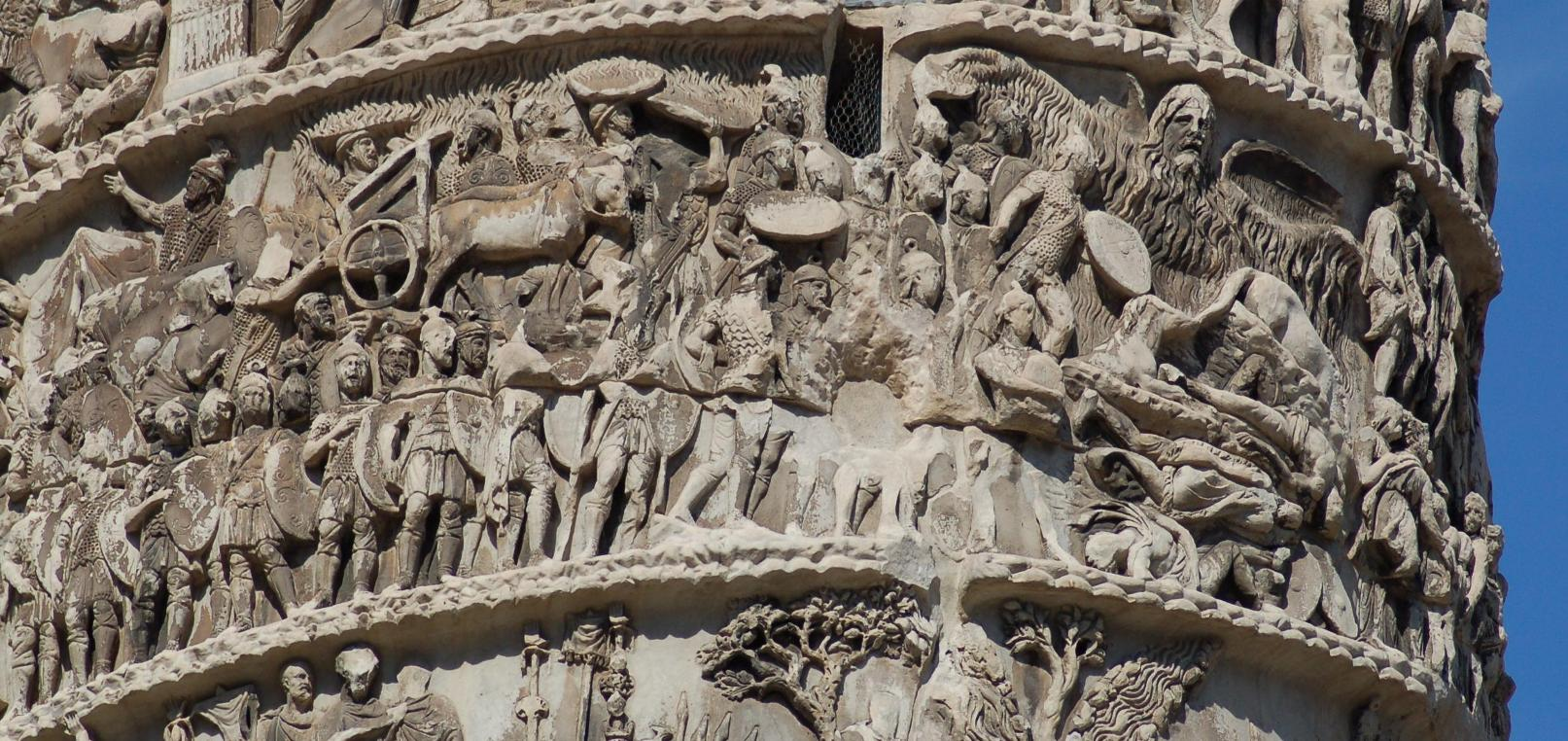
The "Miracle of the Rain" depicted on the Column of Marcus Aurelius in Rome

The Celts were the first population in the territory of present-day Slovakia who can be identified on the basis of written sources. The first Celtic groups came from the West around 400 BC. Settlements of the La Tène culture indicate that the Celts colonized the lowlands along the river Danube and its tributaries. The local population was either subjected by the Celts or withdrew to the mountainous northern territory. New Celtic groups arrived from Northern Italy during the 2nd century BC. The Celts initially lived in tiny huts – 4 by 3 metres (13 ft × 10 ft) in size – which either formed small villages or were scattered across the countryside.

Some of the small hill forts which were built in the 1st century BC developed into important local economic and administrative centers. For example, the hill fort at Zemplín was a center of iron-working; glass works were unearthed at Liptovská Mara; and local coins were struck at Bratislava and Liptovská Mara. Coins from Bratislava bore inscriptions like Biatec and Nonnos. The fort at Liptovská Mara was also an important center of the cult of the bearers of the Púchov culture of the Northern Carpathians.

Burebista, King of the Dacians, invaded the Middle Danube region and subjugated the majority of the local Celtic tribes (the Boii and the Taurisci) around 60 BC. Burebista's empire collapsed after he died about 16 years later. Archaeological sites yielding painted ceramics and other artefacts of Dacian provenance suggest that Dacian groups settled among the local Celts in the region of the rivers Bodrog, Hron and Nitra. The spread of the "Púchov culture", associated with the Celtic Cotini, shows that the bearers of that culture started a northward expansion during the same period.

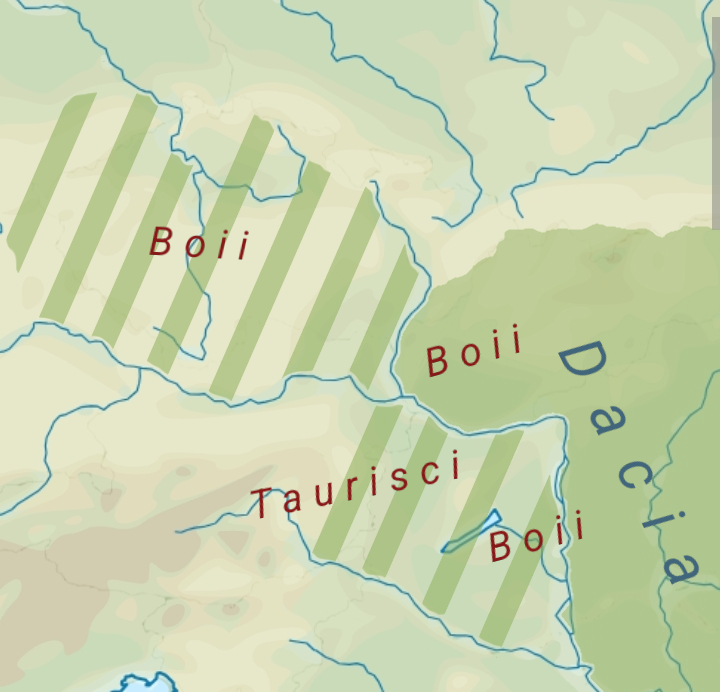
Dacian dominance in today's Slovakia and their influence in neighboring areas

The Romans and the Germanic tribes launched their first invasions against the territories along the Middle Danube in the last decade of the 1st century BC. Roman legions crossed the Danube near Bratislava under the command of Tiberius to fight against the Germanic Quadi in 6 AD, but the local tribes' rebellion in Pannonia forced the Romans to return. Taking advantage of internal strifes, the Romans settled a group of Quadi in the lowlands along the Danube between the rivers Morava and Váh in 21, making Vannius their king. The Germans lived in rectangular houses, rather than square ones, and cremated their dead, placing the ashes in an urn.

Although the Danube formed the frontier between the Roman Empire and the "Barbaricum", the Romans built small outposts along the left bank of the Danube, for instance, at Iža and Devín. During the same period, the Germanic tribes were expanding to the north along the rivers Hron, Ipeľ and Nitra. Roman troops crossed the Danube several times during the Marcomannic Wars between 160 and 180. Emperor Marcus Aurelius accomplished the first chapter of his Meditations during a campaign against the Quadi in the region of the Hron River in 172. The "Miracle of the Rain" – a storm which saved an exhausted Roman army – occurred in the land north of the Danube in 173; Christian authors attributed it to a Christian soldier's prayer. Roman troops crossed the Danube for the last time in 374, during Emperor Valentinian I's campaign against the Quadi who had allied with the Sarmatians and invaded the Roman province of Pannonia.

== Medieval history ==
=== New migrations ===
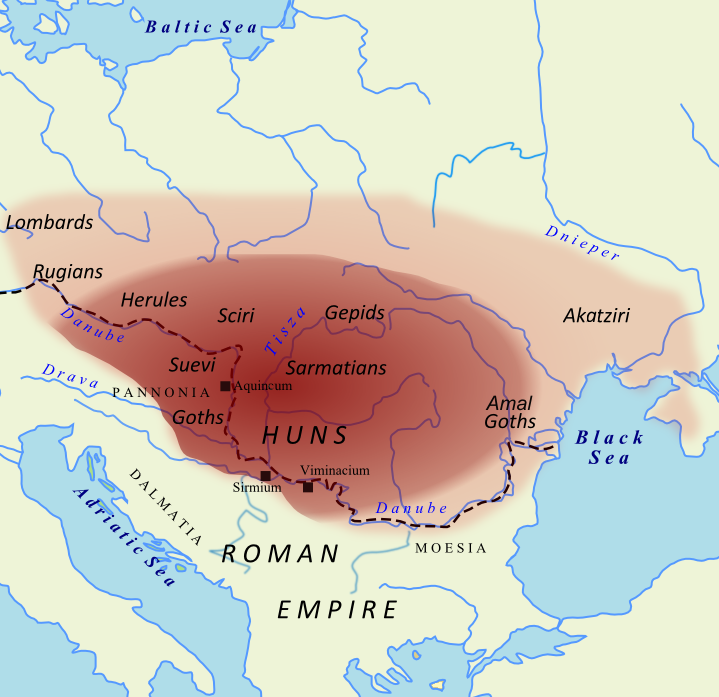
Germanic and other tribes within the Hun-dominated areas, around 450 AD

In the 4th century AD, the Roman Empire could no longer resist the attacks by the neighboring peoples. The empire's frontier started to collapse along the Danube in the 370s. The development of the Hunnic Empire in the Eurasian Steppes forced large groups of Germanic peoples, including the Quadi and the Vandals, to leave their homelands by the Middle Danube and along the upper course of the river Tisza in the early 5th century. Their lands were occupied by the Heruli, Sciri, Rugii and other Germanic peoples. However, the Carpathian Basin was dominated by the nomadic Huns from the early 5th century and the Germanic peoples became subjects to Attila the Hun.

Disputes among Attila's sons caused the disintegration of his empire shortly after his death in 453. The Germanic peoples either regained their independence or left the Carpathian Basin (like the Heruli and the Sciri, respectively). Warriors' graves from the next century yielded large number of swords, spears, arrow heads, axes and other weapons. Other archaeological finds, including a glass beaker from Zohor, shows that the local inhabitants had close contacts with the Frankish Empire and Scandinavia.

=== Arrival of the Slavs ===
Regarding the early history of Slavs, Slavic texts or a record written by a Slav dating from before the late 9th century are not known. The foreign sources (mostly Greek and Latin) about Slavs are very inconsistent. According to a scholarly theory, the first Slavic groups settled in the eastern region of present-day Slovakia already in the 4th century. The 6th-century Byzantine historian Jordanes wrote that the funeral feast at Attila's burial was called strava. Scholars who identify that word as a Slavic expression say that Jordanes' report proves that Slavs inhabited the Carpathian Basin in the middle of the 5th century. However, according to a concurrent scholarly theory, strava may have been a Hunnic term, because no primary source mentioned that the Slavs were present in Attila's court.

Settlements which represented a new archaeological horizon – the so-called "Prague-Korchak cultural horizon" – appeared along the northernmost fringes of the Carpathian Mountains around 500. Similar settlements, which are dated to the second half of the 5th century, were also excavated in the region of the confluence of the Danube and the Morava. "Prague-Korchak" settlements consisted of about 10 semi-sunken huts, each with a stone oven in a corner. The local inhabitants used handmade pottery and cremated the dead. Most historians associate the spread of the "Prague-Korchak" settlements with the expansion of the early Slavs.

According to historian Gabriel Fusek, written sources also evidence the presence of Slavs in the Central Europe in the first half of the 6th century. The 6th-century Byzantine historian, Procopius, wrote of a group of the Heruli who had "passed through the territory of all of the Sclavenes", or Slavs, during their migration towards the northern "Thule". Procopius's report implies that the Slavs inhabited the region of the river Morava, but its credibility is suspect. Procopius also wrote of an exiled Longobard prince, Hildigis, who first fled to the "Sclaveni" and then to the Gepids, "taking with him not only those of the Longobards who had followed him, but also many of the Sclaveni" in the 540s. According to a scholarly theory, Hildigis most probably mustered his Slavic warriors in the region of the Middle Danube.

The Germanic Longobards were expanding towards the Middle Danube in the early 6th century. Archaeological research shows that Longobard expansion bypassed virtually the entire territory of Slovakia and they settled only in the most north-western part of the country (Záhorie). Unlike neighbouring Moravia, Slovakia (except of Záhorie) did not belong to any German empire in this time. The Longobards and the local Slavs remained separated by the natural border formed by Little and White Carpathians, respected by both sides according to Ján Steinhübel. He also writes that the Slavs, who remained "an independent third party" in strained Longobard-Gepid relations, were not interested in conflicts with their Germanic neighbours, but made raids in the faraway Byzantine Empire.

=== Avar Khaganate ===
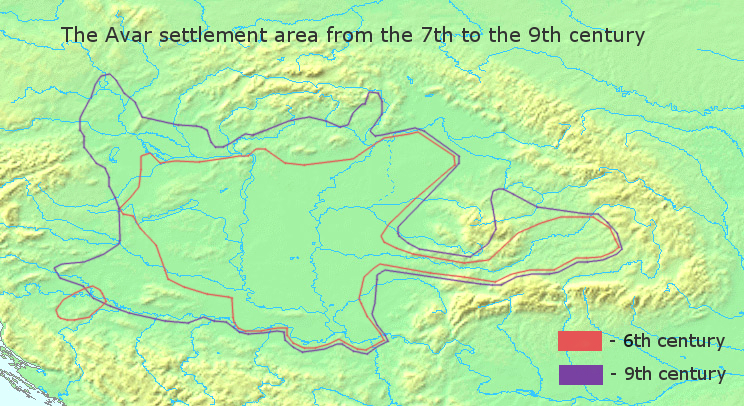
The Avar settlement area from the 7th to the 9th century, according to Éva Garam

The Longobards left the Carpathian Basin for Northern Italy after the invasion of the territory by the Avars in 568. The Avars were a group of nomadic warriors of mixed origin. They conquered the Carpathian Basin, subjugated the local peoples and launched plundering expeditions against the neighboring powers during the next decades. By the time of the Avars' arrival, the Slavs had settled in most lands that now form Slovakia, according to historian Stanislav Kirschbaum. Further migration waves strengthened the local Slavic population because new Slavic groups, pressed by the Avars, crossed the Eastern Carpathians, seceding from the Slavs who continued their expansion to the Balkan Peninsula. Dialects of Slovak still reflect that the Slavs came from different directions already in the Early Middle Ages, according to a widely accepted scholarly theory. Czech and Slovak share some features with the South Slavic languages, distinguishing them from the other West Slavic languages. According to archaeologist P. M. Barford, these features suggest that the Carpathian Mountains and the Sudetes separated the ancestors of the Slovaks and the Czechs from the Slavs living to the north of those mountains. Especially the dialects of Central Slovakia, which "stand out from the continuous chain between the western and eastern dialects", preserved South Slavic features.

The 7th-century Frankish Chronicle of Fredegar wrote that the Avars employed the Slavs, or Wends, as "Befulci", showing that the Slavs formed special military units in the Avar Khaganate. According to the same chronicle, the Wends rose up in rebellion against their Avar masters and elected a Frankish merchant, Samo, their king "in the fortieth year of Clothar's reign", that is in 623 or 624. Modern historians agree that the Avars' defeat during the siege of Constantinople in 626 enabled Samo to consolidate his rule. He routed the invading army of Dagobert I, King of the Franks, in the Battle of Wogastisburg in 631 or 632. The realm of Samo, who ruled for 35 years, collapsed soon after his death. Its exact borders cannot be determined, but it must have been located near the confluence of the Danube and the Morava rivers. Historian Richard Marsina puts its centre to Lower Austria.

A new horizon of mostly hand-made pottery – the so-called "Devínska Nová Ves pottery" – appeared between the Middle Danube and the Carpathians before the end of the 7th century. Large inhumation cemeteries yielding such pottery were unearthed at Bratislava, Holiare, Nové Zámky and other places, suggesting that cemeteries were located near stable settlements. For instance, the cemetery at Devínska Nová Ves, which contained about a thousand inhumation graves and thirty cremations, was used up until the end of the 8th century.

In the 670s, the new population of the "griffin and tendril" archaeological culture appeared in the Pannonian Basin expelling Kuber's Bulgars south out of Sirmium (the westernmost part of Kubrat's Onoguria). Shortly afterwards the new Avar-Slav alliance could expand their territories even also over the Vienna Basin. The political and cultural development in Slovakia continued in two separate lines. Lowland areas in the southern Slovakia got under the direct military control of the Avars. The Avars held strategic centers in Devín and Komárno which belonged to the most important centers of the khaganate. The Avars from Devín controlled Moravia and from Komárno they controlled southern Slovakia. In this time, the Avars already began to adopt a more settled lifestyle. The new period introduced Slavo-Avaric symbiosis and multi-ethnic Slavo-Avaric culture. The Slavs in southern Slovakia adopted new burial rite (inhumation), jewelry, fashion and used also common cemeteries with the Avars. Large Slavo-Avaric cemeteries can be found in Devínska Nová Ves and Záhorská Bystrica near Bratislava and similar cemeteries, the proof of direct Avar power, south of the line Devín-Nitra-Levice-Želovce-Košice-Šebastovce. North of this line, the Slavs preserved previous burial rite (cremation, sometimes tumuli). Natural increase of the population together with immigration from the south led to the settlement also in mountain areas.

In the 8th century, the Slavs increased their agricultural productivity (usage of iron plow) along with further development of crafts. Higher productivity initiated changes in the Slavic society, released a part of human resources previously required for farming and allowed to form groups of professional warriors. The Slavs began to build heavily fortified settlements (hradisko - large grad) protected by strong walls (8–10 m) and trenches (width 4–7 m, depth 2–3.5 m). Among the oldest belong Pobedim, Nitra-Martinský Vrch, Majcichov, Spišské Tomášovce and Divinka. The neighborhood with Avars raised unification process and probably also formation of local military alliances. The archaeological findings from this period (such as an exquisite noble tomb in Blatnica) support the formation of a Slavic upper class on the territory that later became the nucleus of Great Moravia.

A series of Frankish-Avar wars (788–803) led to the political fall of the khaganate. In 805, the Slavs attacked again. Their offensive aimed mainly on the centers of Avar power - Devín and Komárno. The Avars were not able to resist attack and they were expelled to the right bank of Danube. The Slavs from Slovakia probably participated also in further conflicts between small Slavic dukes and remaining Avar tarkhans.

=== Principality of Nitra ===
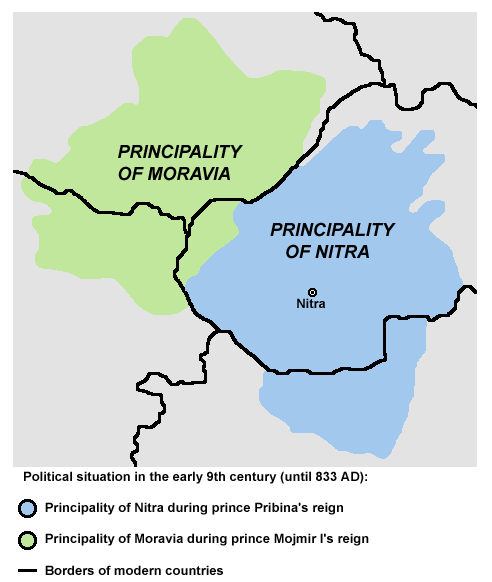
A map presenting Moravia and the Principality of Nitra.

The Conversio Bagoariorum et Carantanorum, written around 870, narrates that Moimir, the leader of the Moravians, expelled one Pribina, forcing him to cross (or come up) the Danube and join Radbod, who was the head of the March of Pannonia in the Carolingian Empire from around 830. Radbod presented Pribina to King Louis the German who ordered that Pribina be instructed in the Christian faith and baptised. Three of the eleven extant copies of the Conversio also contain an out of context statement which says that Adalram, who was Archbishop of Salzburg between 821 and 836, had once consecrated a church on Pribina's "estate at a place over the Danube called Nitrava". According to a widely accepted scholarly theory, "Nitrava" was identical with Nitra in present-day Slovakia and the forced unification of Pribina's Principality of Nitra with Mojmir's Moravia gave rise to the development a new state "Great Moravia".

Between 800 and 832, a group of Slavic hillforts in Slovakia quickly arose and disappeared. Archaeological research confirmed the fall of several important central hillforts approximately around the time when Pribina was expelled, e.g. Pobedim or Čingov. The lack of written sources does not allow to finally conclude if these events were caused by internal changes or by Moravian expansion. Pribina could be a ruler of an independent entity (the Principality of Nitra) or in the case that Moravian expansion preceded his expulsion, he was a member of "Moravian" aristocracy.

Other historians write that Pribina's Nitrava cannot be identified with Nitra. Charles Bowlus says that a letter, written by Theotmar, Archbishop of Salzburg and his suffragan bishops in about 900, strongly suggests that Nitra was only conquered by Svatopluk I of Moravia only in the 870s. However, according to Třeštík, this information can be explained as a reasonable mistake of the Frankish bishops who knew that the territory was in the past a separate "regnum" different from Moravia and because it was ruled by Svatopluk I, they incorrectly assumed that he also conquered it. According to archaeologist Béla Miklós Szőke, no source substantiates either the theory that Pribina was the head of an independent polity or the identification of Nitrava with Nitra.

Richard Marsina writes that the Slovak nation emerged in that principality during Pribina's reign. Regarding the 9th century, the archaeological researches successfully established a distinction between "9th-century Slavic-Moravian" and "steppe" burial horizons in Slovakia.

=== Great Moravia ===
Sure and disputed borders of Great Moravia under Svatopluk I (according to modern historians)

Moravia emerged along the borders of the Avars' territory. Great Moravia arose around 830 when Mojmír I unified the Slavic tribes settled north of the Danube and extended the Moravian supremacy over them. When Mojmír I endeavoured to secede from the supremacy of the king of East Francia in 846, King Louis the German deposed him and assisted Mojmír's nephew, Rastislav (846–870) in acquiring the throne.

The new monarch pursued an independent policy: after stopping a Frankish attack in 855, he also sought to weaken influence of Frankish priests preaching in his realm. Rastislav asked the Byzantine Emperor Michael III to send teachers who would interpret Christianity in the Slavic vernacular. Upon Rastislav's request, two brothers, Byzantine officials and missionaries Saints Cyril and Methodius came in 863. Cyril developed the first Slavic alphabet and translated the Gospel into Old Church Slavonic. Rastislav was also preoccupied with the security and administration of his state. Numerous fortified castles built throughout the country are dated to his reign and some of them (e.g., Dowina - Devín Castle) are also mentioned in connection with Rastislav by Frankish chronicles.

During Rastislav's reign, the Principality of Nitra was given to his nephew Svätopluk as an appanage. The rebellious prince allied himself with the Franks and overthrew his uncle in 870. Similarly to his predecessor, Svätopluk I (871–894) assumed the title of the king (rex). During his reign, the Great Moravian Empire reached its greatest territorial extent, when not only present-day Moravia and Slovakia but also present-day northern and central Hungary, Lower Austria, Bohemia, Silesia, Lusatia, southern Poland and northern Serbia belonged to the empire, but the exact borders of his domains are still disputed by modern authors. Svätopluk also withstood attacks of the seminomadic Hungarian tribes and the Bulgarian Empire, although sometimes it was he who hired the Hungarians when waging war against East Francia.

In 880, Pope John VIII set up an independent ecclesiastical province in Great Moravia with Archbishop Methodius as its head. He also named the German cleric Wiching the Bishop of Nitra.

After the death of King Svätopluk in 894, his sons Mojmír II (894–906?) and Svatopluk II succeeded him as the King of Great Moravia and the Prince of Nitra respectively. However, they started to quarrel for domination of the whole empire. Weakened by an internal conflict as well as by constant warfare with Eastern Francia, Great Moravia lost most of its peripheral territories.

In the meantime, the Hungarian tribes, having suffered a defeat from the nomadic Pechenegs, left their territories east of the Carpathian Mountains, invaded the Pannonian Basin and started to occupy the territory gradually around 896. Their armies' advance may have been promoted by continuous wars among the countries of the region whose rulers still hired them occasionally to intervene in their struggles.

Both Mojmír II and Svätopluk II probably died in battles with the Hungarians between 904 and 907 because their names are not mentioned in written sources after 906. In three battles (4–5 July and 9 August 907) near Brezalauspurc (now Bratislava), the Hungarians routed Bavarian armies. Historians traditionally put this year as the date of the breakup of the Great Moravian Empire.

Great Moravia left behind a lasting legacy in Central and Eastern Europe. The Glagolitic script and its successor Cyrillic were disseminated to other Slavic countries, charting a new path in their cultural development. The administrative system of Great Moravia may have influenced the development of the administration of the Kingdom of Hungary.

=== High Middle Ages ===
==== Settlement of Hungarians in the 10th century ====
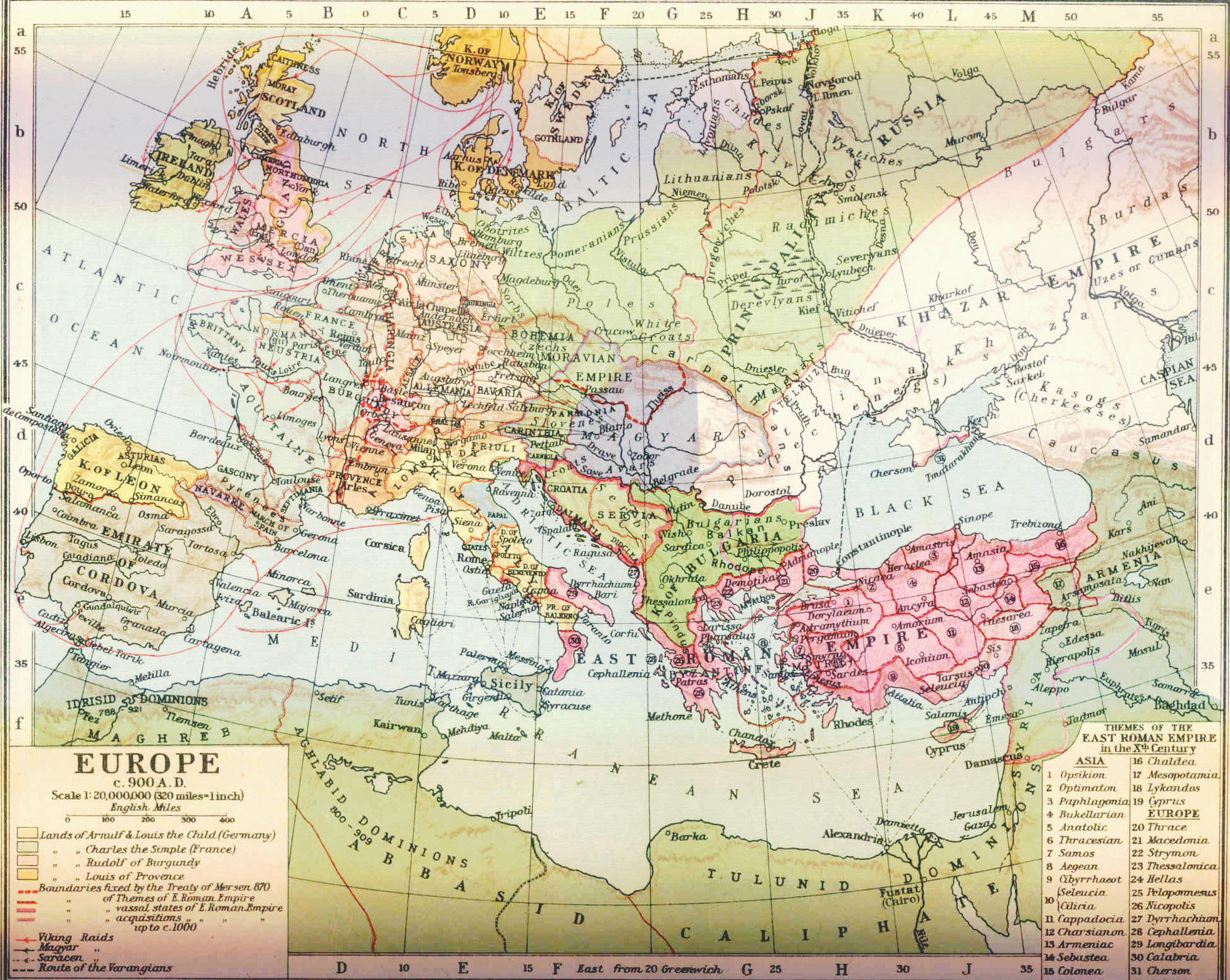
Europe around 900.

From 895 to 902, the Hungarians progressively imposed their authority on the Pannonian Basin. Although some contemporary sources mention that Great Moravia disappeared without trace and its inhabitants left, archaeological research and toponyms suggest the continuity of Slavic population in the river valleys of the Inner Western Carpathians.

The oldest Hungarian graves in Slovakia are dated to the end of the 9th and the beginning of the 10th century (Medzibordožie region, Eastern Slovakia). These findings document only a relatively short stay, without direct continuation in the settlement. Further findings elsewhere, in the most southern parts of Slovakia, are dated to 920-925 and consist mainly of graves of warrior type (isolated graves and smaller groups). Between 930 and 940, larger groups of Magyars began to migrate to the southern parts of today's Slovakia, but did not cross the line Bratislava, Hlohovec, Nitra, Levice, Lučenec, Rimavská Sobota. The territory affected by this early migration covers about 15% of today's Slovakia (7,500 km^{2}). Hungarian settlements from these first two waves are not documented in the most fertile regions of Trnava Board, Považie north of Hlohovec, Ponitrie north of Nitra and the Eastern Slovak Lowland. The initial confrontation did not have a permanent character, and during the 10th century both populations coexisted. In southern Slovakia, the Hungarians frequently founded their villages close to the older Slavic settlements as they changed their nomadic lifestyle and settled; they occasionally joined them and used the same cemeteries. In the 11th century, the differences between Slavic and Magyar graves disappeared. (Note: Christianisation of Hungarians for example influenced burial rite and customs like inhumation with horse parts and tacks.) The archaeological research has also significantly changed the view on the settlement of the northern parts of the country. In addition to the southern parts and river valleys of Nitra (river) and Váh, a relative high population density is notable particularly for the Spiš region with the Poprad river valley and the Turiec Basin. Liptov and the Zvolen Basins, Žilina Basin, Central Orava and northern Šariš were rather sparsely populated.

After the fall of the state, some non-landholding noblemen joined the Hungarian forces and participated in their raids in other parts of Europe. The chroniclers of the early history of the Kingdom of Hungary recorded that the prominent noble families of the kingdom descended either from leaders of the Hungarian tribes or from immigrants, and they did not connect any of them to Great Moravia. Archaeological evidence proves that to the north of the line mentioned above, not only did the older settlement structures survive, but so also did the territorial administration led by native magnates. (Note: This older hypothesis was unanimously confirmed by archaeological evidences from Ducové and Nitrianska Blatnica.) The Great Moravian or potential Great Moravian origin of the clan Hunt-Pázmán (Hont-Pázmány) has been advanced by some modern scholars.

The territory of the present-day Slovakia became progressively integrated into the developing state (the future Kingdom of Hungary) in the early 10th century. The Gesta Hungarorum ("Deeds of the Hungarians") mentions that Huba, head of one of the seven Hungarian tribes, received possessions around Nitra and the Žitava River; while according to the Gesta Hunnorum et Hungarorum ("Deeds of the Huns and Hungarians") another tribal leader, Lél, settled down around Hlohovec (Hungarian: Galgóc) and following the Hungarian victory over the Moravians, he usually stayed around Nitra. Modern authors also claim that the north-western parts of the Pannonian Basin were occupied by one of the Hungarian tribes.

==== Tercia pars regni or Principality of Nitra (11th century) ====
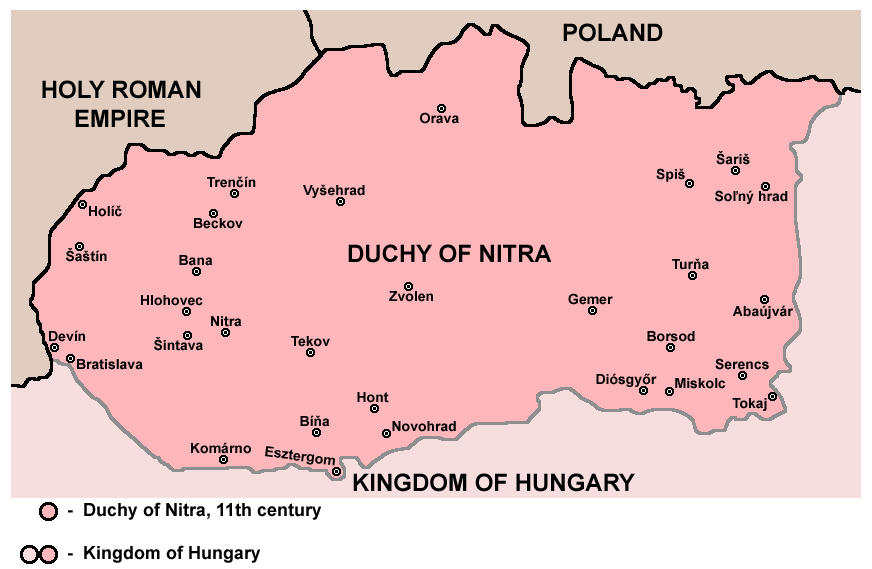
Suggested borders of the Duchy of Nitra, proposed by Ján Steinhübel based on the description of the southern frontiers of Poland under Duke Bolesław the Brave (r. 992–1025) in the late 13th-century Polish-Hungarian Chronicle

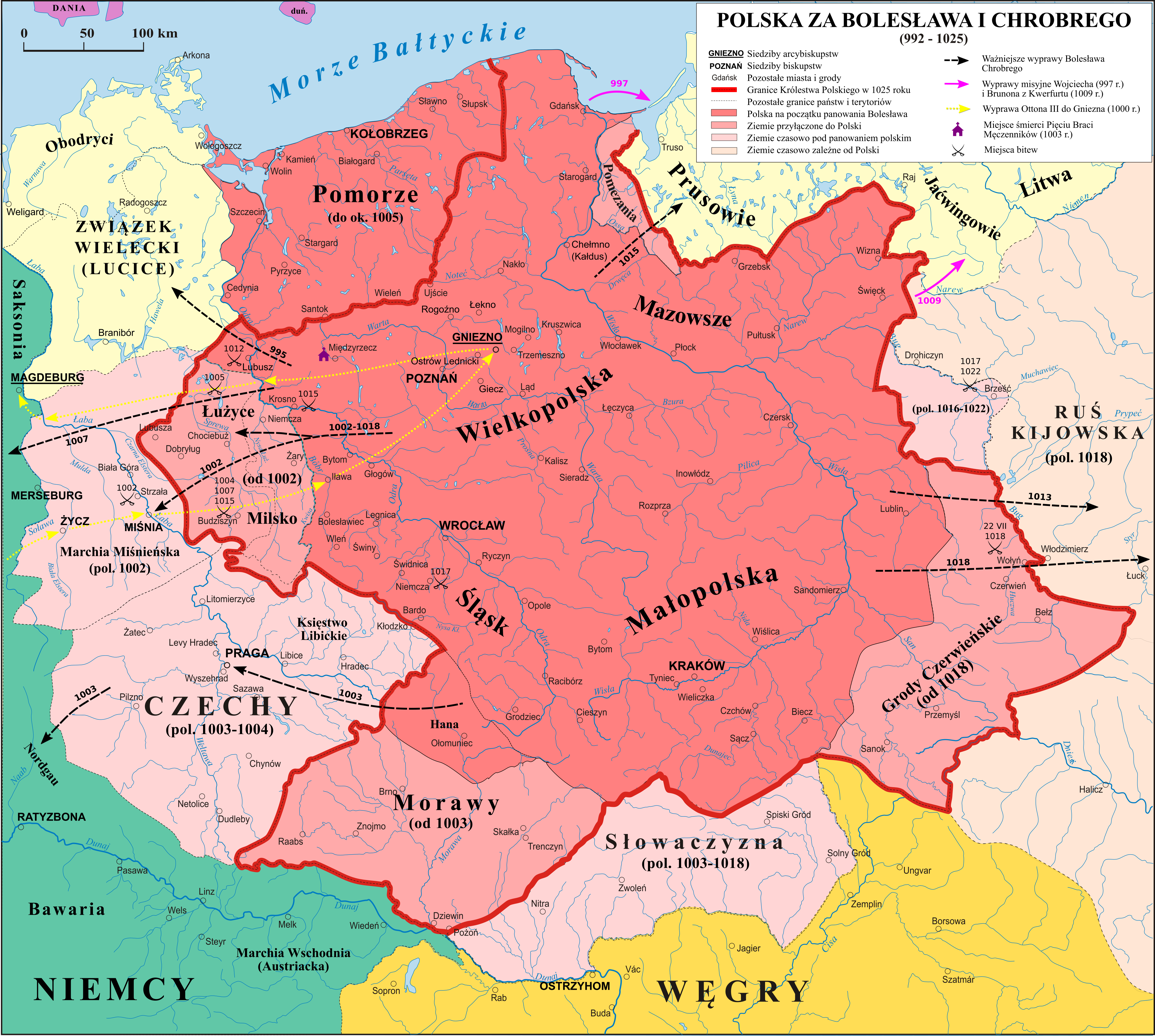
Present-day Slovakia as part of Poland under the reign of Bolesław the Brave (r. 992–1025): the borders of Poland are described based on the report of the late 13th-century Polish-Hungarian Chronicle, the reliability of which is not universally accepted by specialists

The development of the future Kingdom of Hungary started during the reign of Grand Prince Géza (before 972–997) who expanded his rule over the territories of present-day Slovakia west of the River Garam / Hron. Although, he was baptised in or after 972, he never became a convinced Christian – in contrast to his son, Stephen who followed him in 997. Some authors claim that following his marriage with Giselle of Bavaria, Stephen received the "Duchy of Nitra" in appanage from his father.

When Géza died, a member of the Árpád dynasty, the pagan Koppány claimed the succession, but Stephen defeated him with the assistance of his wife's German retinue. Following his victory, Stephen received a crown from Pope Silvester II and he was crowned as the first King of Hungary in 1000 or 1001.

The Kingdom of Hungary integrated elements of the former Great Moravian state organization. On the other hand, historians have not reached a consensus on this subject; e.g., it is still being debated whether the formation of the basic unit of the administration (vármegye) in the kingdom followed foreign ( Frankish, Bulgarian, Moravian or Ottonian) patterns or it was an internal innovation.

Stephen (1000/1001–1038) established at least eight counties ("vármegye") on the territories of present-day Slovakia: Abov (Hungarian: Abaúj), Boršod (Hungarian: Borsod), Esztergom, Hont, Komárno (Hungarian: Komárom), Nitra (Hungarian: Nyitra), Tekov (Hungarian: Bars) and Zemplín (Hungarian: Zemplén) were probably founded by him. The scarcely populated northern and north-eastern territories of today Slovakia became the kings' private forests. King Stephen also set up several dioceses in his kingdom; in the 11th century, present-day Slovakia's territories were divided between the Archdiocese of Esztergom (established around 1000) and its suffragan, the Diocese of Eger (founded between 1006 and 1009).

Around 1015, Duke Bolesław I of Poland took some territories of present-day Slovakia east of the River Morava, with Hungarian King Stephen recapturing these territories in 1018.

Following King Stephen's death, his kingdom got involved in internal conflicts among the claimants for his crown and Henry III, Holy Roman Emperor also intervened in the struggles. In 1042, the Emperor Henry captured some parts of today Slovakia east of the River Hron and granted them to King Stephen's cousin, Béla, but following the withdrawal of the Emperor's armies, King Samuel Aba's troops recaptured the territories.

In 1048, King Andrew I of Hungary conceded one-third of his kingdom (Tercia pars regni) in appanage to his brother, Duke Béla. The duke's domains were centered around Nitra and Bihar (in Romanian: Biharea in present-day Romania). During the following 60 years, the Tercia pars regni were governed separately by members of the Árpád dynasty (i.e., by the Dukes Géza, Ladislaus, Lampert and Álmos). The dukes accepted the kings' supremacy, but some of them (Béla, Géza and Álmos) rebelled against the king in order to acquire the crown and allied themselves with the rulers of the neighbouring countries (e.g., the Holy Roman Empire, Bohemia).

The history of the Tercia pars regni ended in 1107, when King Coloman of Hungary occupied its territories taking advantage of the pilgrimage of Duke Álmos (his brother) to the Holy Land. Although, Duke Álmos, when returned to the kingdom, tried to reoccupy his former duchy with the military assistance of Henry V, Holy Roman Emperor, but he failed and was obliged to accept the status quo.

==== Mongol invasion (1241–1242) ====
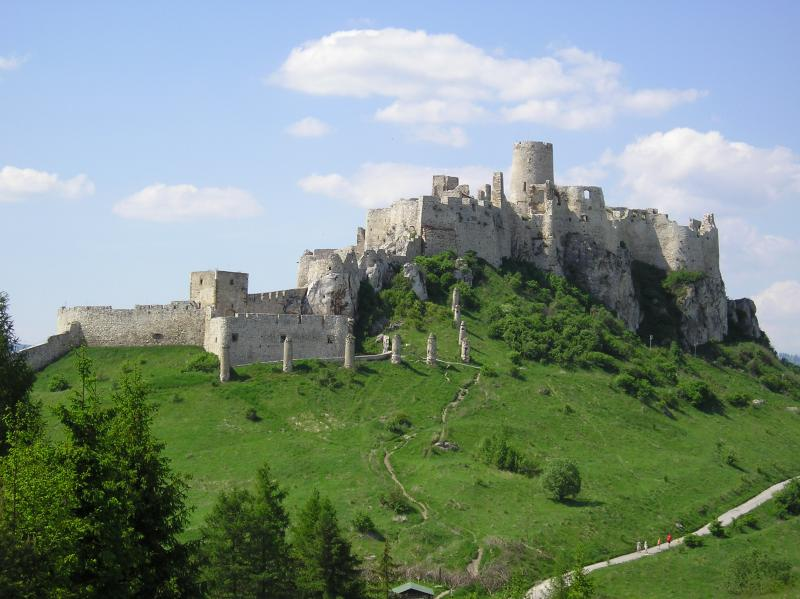
The Mongol invasion in the 13th century led to construction of mighty stone castles, such as Spiš Castle.

In 1241, the Mongols invaded and devastated the north-western parts of the kingdom. In April 1241, the Mongolian army crossed the border with Moravia near Hrozenkov. Trenčín Castle resisted the attack, but nearby places were plundered and some of them have never been restored. Mongols turned to the south and devastated regions along rivers Váh and Nitra. Only the strong castles, e.g., Trenčín, Nitra, Fiľakovo (Hungarian: Fülek) and fortified towns could resist attack. A part of the unprotected population escaped to the mountains and rough terrain where they built hill forts and camps. Most affected areas were the southwest Slovakia, Lower Pohronie to Zvolen and Zemplín. It is estimated that at least a third of population died from famine and epidemics.

Following the withdrawal of the Mongol army, Frederick II, Duke of Austria invaded the country. In July 1242 his army reached Hlohovec but the Hungarian army, mainly thank to troops from Trenčín and Nitra counties repelled the attack. Bohumír (Bogomer), the župan of Trenčín who played an important role in the suppression of Austrian units, later led the army send to help Bolesław V the Chaste (son-in-law of the Hungarian king) attacked by Konrad I of Masovia. The army consisted mainly of soldiers from the ethnic Slovak counties.

==== Development of counties and towns ====
The royal administration of the territory was developing gradually during the 11th-13th centuries: new counties were established with the partition of existing ones or central counties of the kingdom expanded their territory northward today's Bratislava (Slovak: Prešporok, Hungarian: Pozsony), Trenčín, Gemer-Malohont (Hungarian: Gömör-Kishont) and Novohrad (Hungarian: Nógrád), while the kings' private forests were organised into "forest counties" around Zvolen and Šariš Castle (Hungarian: Sáros). Following the occupation of his brother's duchy, King Coloman set up (or re-established) the third bishopric in present-day Slovakia.

Some of the towns in present-day Slovakia were granted special privileges already prior to the Mongol invasion: Trnava (1238), Starý Tekov (1240), Zvolen and Krupina (before 1241). Following the withdrawal of the Mongol troops (1242), several castles were built or strengthened (e.g., Komárno, Beckov (Hungarian: Beckó) and Zvolen) on the order of King Béla IV. In addition to a relatively developed network of castles, agglomerations of an urban character became more important. Medieval towns should serve both to economic and defensive purposes.

The territory of present-day Slovakia was rich in raw materials like gold, silver, copper, iron and salt and therefore the mining industry developed gradually in the region. The development of the mining industry and commerce strengthened the position of some settlements and they received privileges from the kings. The list of towns with the earliest charters contains Spišské Vlachy (1243), Košice (before 1248), Nitra (1248), Banská Štiavnica (1255), Nemecká Ľupča (1263), Komárno (1269), Gelnica (before 1270), Bratislava (1291) and Prešov, Veľký Šariš and Sabinov (all in 1299). The Saxons in Spiš (German: Zips) were granted a collective charter (1271) by King Stephen V of Hungary.

The colonisation of the northern parts of the Kingdom of Hungary continued during the period; Walloon, German, Hungarian and Slavic "guests" (hospes, as they are called in contemporary documents) arrived to the scarcely populated lands and settled down there. The contemporary documents mention that settlers from Moravia and Bohemia arrived to the western parts of present-day Slovakia, while on the northern and eastern parts, Polish and Ruthenian "guests" settled down.

German guests had an important but not exclusive role in the development of towns. Smaller groups of Germans were present already prior the Mongol invasion, but their immigration took a significant rate in the 13th-14th century. In that time, there already existed settlements with a relatively highly developed economy in the territory of present-day Slovakia, but Germans who came from economically and administrative more advanced regions introduced new forms of production and management, new legal system and culture. The German guests settled in Upper and Lower Spiš, mining towns in Central Slovakia, their wide surroundings and many localities in Western Slovakia: Bratislava, Trnava and wine-growing towns in Malé Karpaty.

In the Middle Ages, present-day Slovakia belonged to the most urbanized regions of the Kingdom of Hungary and it was an important cultural and economic base. According to the decree of the King Vladislaus II Jagiello (1498) six of the ten most important towns in the kingdom were located in the present-day Slovakia: Košice, Bratislava, Bardejov, Prešov, Trnava and Levoča. In 1514, more than half of the royal towns and free mining towns of the kingdom were located in Slovakia. At the end of the Middle Ages, about two hundred other settlements had an urban character from a functional point of view. The first written mention prior 1500 is available for 2.476 settlements. The mining towns in Slovakia significantly contributed to the economy of the Kingdom of Hungary. Around the middle of the 14th century, Kremnica alone produced 400 kg of gold per year. Banská Štiavnica and Banská Bystrica produced a substantial proportion of silver of the whole kingdom. During the second half of the 14th century, the Kingdom of Hungary produced cca 25% of Europe's total output.

The towns formed unions and associations to defend their privileges and common interests. The most important unions were the Community of Saxons of Spiš (German: Zips) (later reduced and known as the province of twenty-four Spiš towns), the Lower Hungarian Mining Towns (mining towns in Central Slovakia), Pentapolis (alliance of free royal towns in present-day Eastern Slovakia) and the Upper Hungarian Mining Towns (mining towns in eastern Slovakia including two mining towns in present-day Hungary).

The inhabitants of the privileged towns were mainly of German origin, followed by Slovaks and smaller number of Hungarians. (Note: Hungarian population was dominant in free royal town Komárno, in other important towns like Košice or Nitra they lived together with substantial German and Slovak populations. Slovaks had an overwhelming majority in Trenčín.) Royal privileges prove that several families of the developing local nobility (e.g., the Zathureczky, Pominorszky and Viszocsányi families) were of Slavic origin. The presence of Jews in several towns (e.g., in Bratislava, Pezinok) is also documented at least from the 13th century; the Jews' special status was confirmed by a charter of King Béla IV of Hungary in 1251, but decisions of local synods limited the participation of Jews (i.e., they could not hold offices and they could not own lands). The Muslims, living in the region of Nitra, also faced similar limitations; they disappeared (perhaps converted to Christianity) by the end of the 13th century.

==== Period of the oligarchs (1290–1321) ====
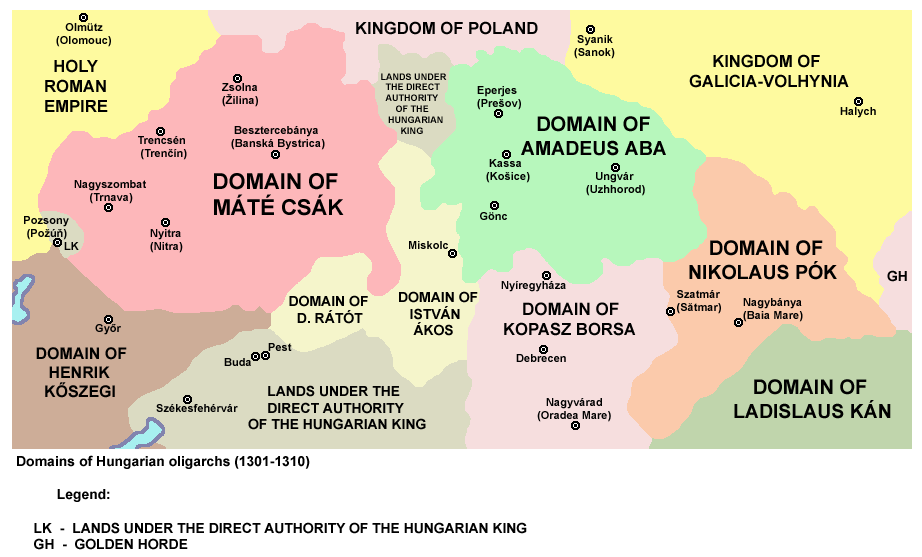
Areas ruled by Matthew III Csák and Amade Aba.

The last decades of the 13th century were characterized by discords within the royal family and among the several groups of the aristocracy. The decay of the royal power and the rise of some powerful aristocrats gave rise to the transformation of the administrative system: the counties that had been the basic units of the royal administration ("royal counties") transformed gradually into autonomous administrative units of the local nobility ("noble counties"); however, the local nobility was not able to stop the rise of oligarchs.

Following the Mongol invasion of the kingdom, a competition started among the landowners: each of them endeavored to build a castle with or without the permission of the king. The competition started a process of differentiation among the noble families, because the nobles who were able to build a castle could also expand their influence over the neighbouring landowners. The conflicts among the members of the royal family also strengthened the power of the aristocrats (who sometimes received whole counties from the kings) and resulted in the formation of around eight huge territories (domains) in the kingdom, governed by powerful aristocrats in the 1290s.

The provinces of the Kingdom of Hungary ruled by the "oligarchs" (powerful lords) in early 14th century

In present-day Slovakia, most of the castles were owned by two powerful aristocrats (Amade Aba and Matthew III Csák) or their followers. Following the extinction of the Árpád dynasty (1301), both of them pretended to follow one of the claimants for the throne, but, in practice, they governed their territories independently. Amade Aba governed the eastern parts of present-day Slovakia from his seat in Gönc. He was killed by Charles Robert of Anjou's assassins at the south gate in Košice in 1311.

Matthew III Csák was the de facto ruler of the western territories of present-day Slovakia, from his seat at Trenčín. He allied himself with the murdered Amade Aba's sons against Košice, but King Charles I of Hungary, who had managed to acquire the throne against his opponents, gave military assistance to the town and the royal armies defeated him at the Battle of Rozgony / Rozhanovce in 1312. However, the north-western counties remained in his power until his death in 1321 when the royal armies occupied his former castles without resistance.

Pressburg (Bratislava) county was de facto ruled by the Dukes of Austria from 1301 to 1328 when King Charles I of Hungary reoccupied it.

=== Late Middle Ages (14th–15th centuries) ===
King Charles I strengthened the central power in the kingdom following a 20-year-long period of struggles against his opponents and the oligarchs. He concluded commercial agreements with Kings John of Bohemia and Casimir III of Poland in 1335 which increased the trade on the commercial routes leading from Košice to Kraków and from Žilina (hu. Zsolna) to Brno.

The king confirmed the privileges of the 24 "Saxon" towns in Spiš, strengthened the special rights of Prešov and granted town privileges to Smolník (hu. Szomolnok ) The towns of present-day Slovakia were still dominated by its German citizens. However, the Privilegium pro Slavis, dated to 1381, attests notably to nation-building in the wealthy towns: King Louis I gave the Slavs half of the seats in the municipal council of Žilina. Many of the towns (e.g., Banská Bystrica, Bratislava, Košice, Kremnica and Trnava) received the status of "free royal cities" (liberæ regiæ civitates) and they were entitled to send deputies to the assemblies of the Estates of the Kingdom from 1441.

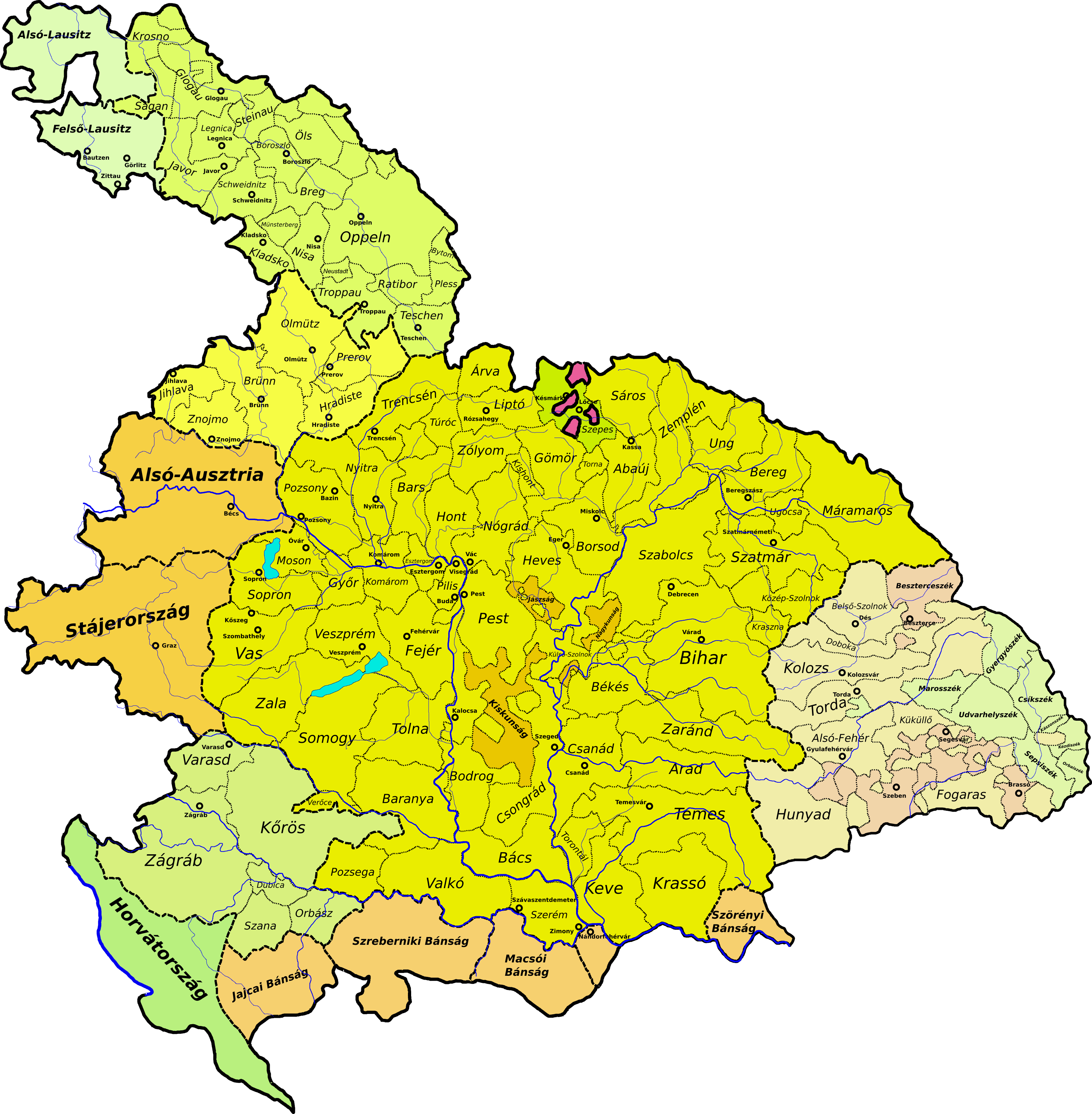
The territories of Matthias Corvinus

In the first half of the 14th century, the population of the regions of the former "forest counties" increased and their territories formed new counties such as Orava, Liptov, Turiec, Zvolen in the northern parts of present-day Slovakia. In the region of Spiš, some elements of the population received special privileges: the 24 "Saxon" towns formed an autonomous community, independent of Spiš county, and the "nobles with ten lances" were organised into a special autonomous administrative unit ("seat"). In 1412, King Sigismund mortgaged 13 of the "Saxon" towns to King Władysław II of Poland so they de facto belonged to Poland until 1769.

From the 1320s, most of the lands of present-day Slovakia were owned by the kings, but prelates and aristocratic families (e.g., the Drugeth, Szentgyörgyi and Szécsényi families) also hold properties on the territory. In December 1385, the future King Sigismund, who was Queen Mary of Hungary's prince consort at that time, mortgaged the territories of present-day Slovakia west of the Váh River to his cousins, the Jobst and Prokop of Moravia; and the former held his territories until 1389, while the latter could maintain his rule over some of the territories until 1405. King Sigismund (1387–1437) granted vast territories to his followers (e.g., to the members of the Cillei, Rozgonyi and Perényi families) during his reign; one of his principal advisers, the Polish Stibor of Stiboricz styled himself "Lord of the whole Váh" referring to his 15 castles around the river.

Following the death of King Albert (1439), civil war broke out among the followers of the claimants for the throne. The Dowager Queen Elisabeth hired Czech mercenaries led by Jan Jiskra who captured several towns on the territory of present-day Slovakia (e.g., Kremnica, Levoča and Bardejov) and maintained most of them until 1462 when he surrendered to King Matthias Corvinus.

== Modern era ==
=== Early modern period ===
==== Habsburg and Ottoman administration ====
The Ottoman Empire conquered the central part of the Kingdom of Hungary, and proceeded to establish several Ottoman provinces across the kingdom (see Budin Eyalet, Eğri Eyalet, Uyvar Eyalet, Kanije Eyalet, Temeşvar Eyalet, Varat Eyalet). Transylvania became an Ottoman protectorate vassal and a base which gave birth to all the anti-Habsburg revolts led by the nobility of the Kingdom of Hungary during the period 1604 to 1711. The remaining part of the former Kingdom of Hungary, which included much of the present-day territory of Slovakia (except for the southern central regions), northwestern present-day Hungary, and present-day Burgenland in Austria, resisted Ottoman conquest and subsequently became a province of the Habsburg monarchy. It remained known as the Kingdom of Hungary, but is referred to by some modern historians as "Royal Hungary". Most of the territory of present-day Slovakia was briefly incorporated into an Ottoman vassal state.

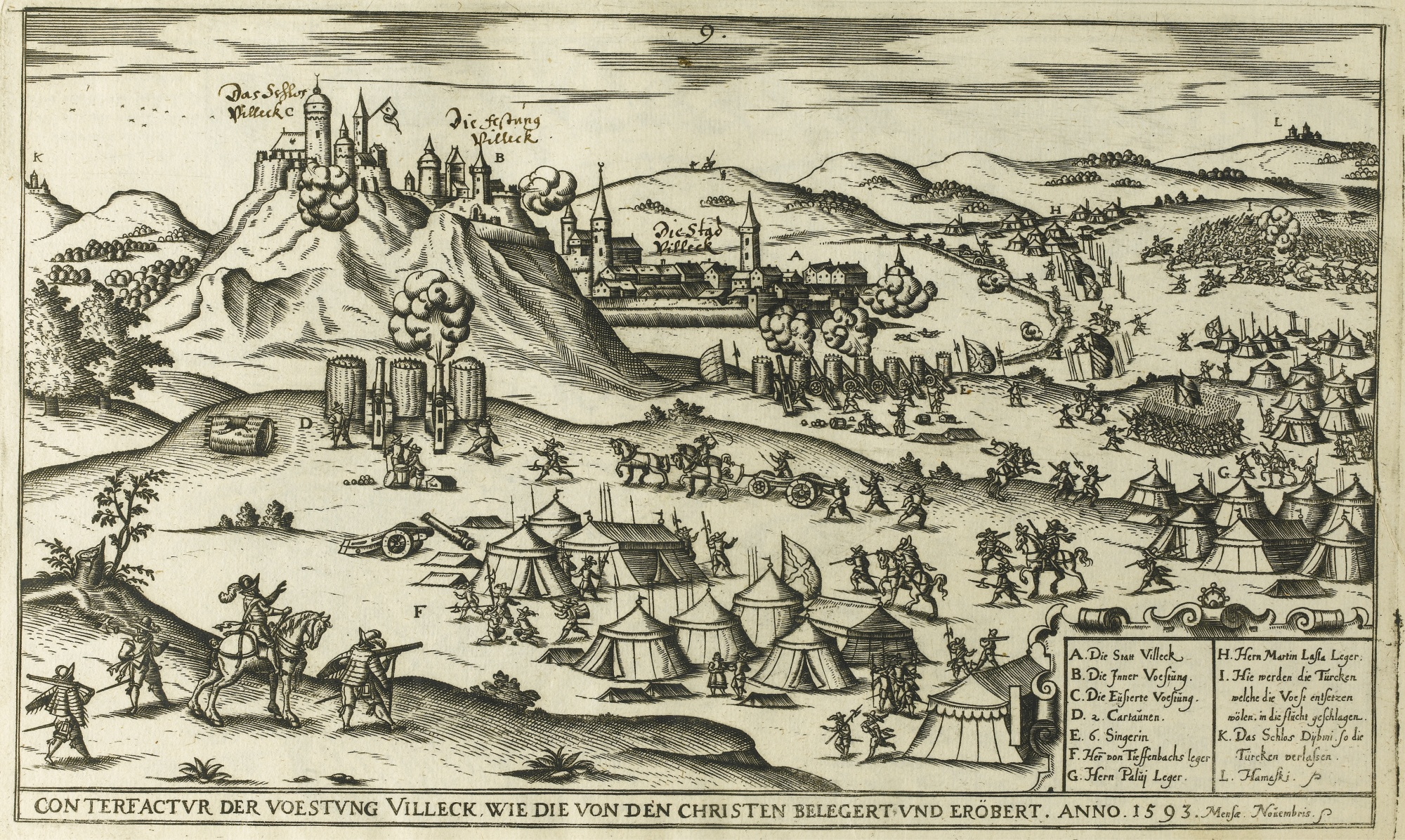
The Long Turkish War in 1593–1606

Ferdinand I, Archduke of Austria was elected king of the Habsburg Kingdom of Hungary. After the conquest of Buda in 1541 by the Ottomans, Pressburg (the modern-day capital of Slovakia, Bratislava) became, for the period between 1536 and 1784/1848, the capital and the coronation city of the Habsburg Kingdom of Hungary. From 1526 to 1830, nineteen Habsburg sovereigns went through coronation ceremonies as Kings and Queens of the Kingdom of Hungary in St. Martin's Cathedral.

After the Ottoman invasion, the territories that had been administered by the Kingdom of Hungary became, for almost two centuries, the principal battleground of the Turkish wars. The region suffered due to the wars against Ottoman expansion. Significant loss of life and property occurred during the wars and the region also practically lost all of its natural riches, especially gold and silver, which went to pay for the costly and difficult combat of an endemic war. In addition, double taxation of some areas was a common practice, which further worsened the living standards of the declining population of local settlements.

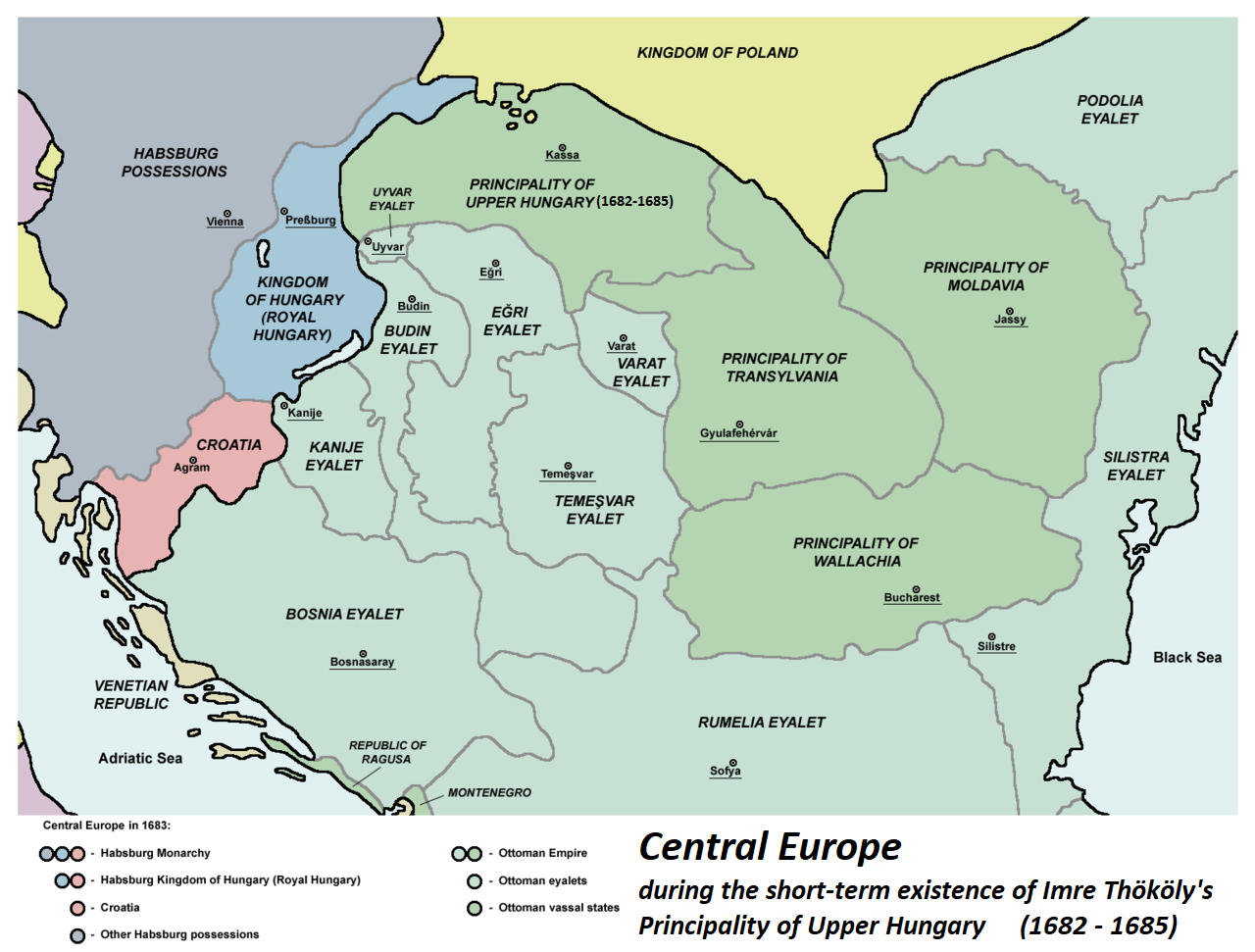
The Principality of Upper Hungary was a short lived Ottoman vassal state ruled by Imre Thököly

During Ottoman administration, parts of the territory of present-day Slovakia were included into Ottoman provinces known as the Budin Eyalet, Eğri Eyalet and Uyvar Eyalet. Uyvar Eyalet had its administrative center in the territory of present-day Slovakia, in the town of Uyvar (Slovak: Nové Zámky). In the second half of the 17th century, Ottoman authority was expanded to Upper Hungary (now mostly present-day Slovakia), where an Ottoman vassal state led by prince Imre Thököly was established between 1682 and 1685.

After the ousting of the Ottomans from Budin (which later became Budapest) in 1686, it became the capital of the Habsburg Kingdom of Hungary. Despite living under Hungarian, Habsburg and Ottoman administration for several centuries, the Slovak people succeeded in keeping their language and their culture.

=== Late modern period ===
==== Slovak National Movement ====
During the 18th century, the Slovak National Movement emerged, partially inspired by the broader Pan-Slavic movement with the aim of fostering a sense of national identity among the Slovak people. Advanced mainly by Slovak religious leaders, the movement grew during the 19th century. At the same time, the movement was divided along the confessional lines and various groups had different views on everything from quotidian strategy to linguistics. Moreover, the Hungarian control remained strict after 1867 and the movement was constrained by the official policy of magyarization.

The first codification of standard Slovak by Anton Bernolák in the 1780s was based on the dialect from western Slovakia. It was supported by mainly Roman Catholic intellectuals, with the center in Trnava. The Lutheran intellectuals continued to use a Slovakized form of Czech. Especially Ján Kollár and Pavel Jozef Šafárik were adherents of Pan-Slavic concepts that stressed the unity of all Slavic peoples. They considered Czechs and Slovaks members of a single nation and they attempted to draw the languages closer together.

In the 1840s, the Protestants split as Ľudovít Štúr developed a standard language based on the dialect from central Slovakia. His followers stressed the separate identity of the Slovak nation and uniqueness of its language. Štúr's version was finally approved by both the Catholics and the Lutherans in 1847 and, after several reforms, it remains standard Slovak.

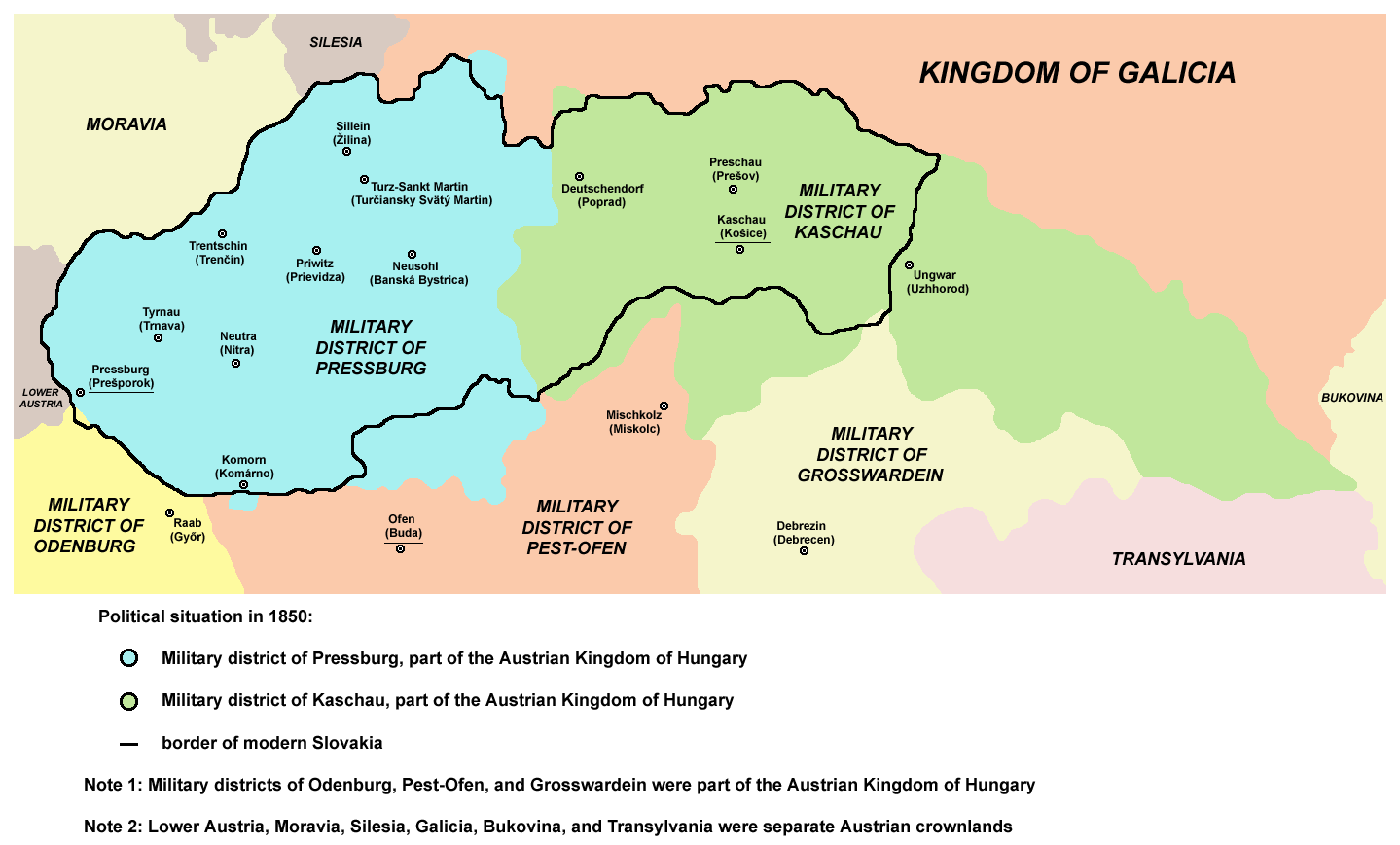
A map of the northern part of the Habsburg Kingdom of Hungary in 1850, showing the two military districts which had administrative centres in the territory of present-day Slovakia

==== Hungarian Revolution of 1848 ====
In the Hungarian Revolution of 1848, Slovak nationalist leaders took the side of the Austrians in order to promote their separation from the Kingdom of Hungary within the Austrian monarchy. The Slovak National Council even organized an uprising from Vienna against the Hungarian revolutionary government with the aim of equalizing Slovaks and gaining autonomy in the Habsburg monarchy, called the Slovak Uprising. In September, 1848, the Slovak National Council managed to organize a short-lived administration of the captured territories. However, the Slovak troops were later disbanded by the Vienna Imperial Court. On the other hand, thousands of volunteers from the current territory of Slovakia, among them a great number of Slovaks, fought in the Hungarian Army.

After the defeat of the Hungarian Revolution, the Hungarian political elite was oppressed by the Austrian authorities and many participants of the Revolution were executed, imprisoned, or forced to emigrate. In 1850, the Kingdom of Hungary was divided into five military districts or provinces, two of which had administrative centers in the territory of present-day Slovakia: the Military District of Pressburg (Bratislava) and the Military District of Košice.

The Austrian authorities abolished both provinces in 1860. The Slovak political elite made use of the period of neo-absolutism of the Vienna court and the weakness of the traditional Hungarian elite to promote their national goals. Turz-Sankt Martin (Martin / Túrócszentmárton) became the foremost center of the Slovak National Movement with foundation of the nationwide cultural association Matica slovenská (1863), the Slovak National Museum, and the Slovak National Party (1871).

==== Austro-Hungarian Compromise of 1867 ====
The heyday of the movement came to a sudden end after 1867, when the Habsburg domains in central Europe underwent a constitutional transformation into the dual monarchy of Austria-Hungary as a result of the Austro-Hungarian Compromise of 1867. The territory of present-day Slovakia was included in the Hungarian part of the dual monarchy, dominated by the Hungarian political elite which distrusted the Slovak elite due to its Pan-Slavism, separatism and its recent stand against the Hungarian Revolution of 1848. Matica was accused of Pan-Slavic separatism and was dissolved by the authorities in 1875; and other Slovak institutions (including schools) shared the same fate.

New signs of national and political life appeared only at the very end of the 19th century. Slovaks became aware that they needed to ally themselves with others in their struggle. One result of this awareness, the Congress of Oppressed Peoples of the Kingdom of Hungary, held in Budapest in 1895, alarmed the government. In their struggle Slovaks received a great deal of help from the Czechs. In 1896, the concept of Czecho-Slovak Mutuality was established in Prague to strengthen Czecho-Slovak cooperation and support the secession of Slovaks from the Kingdom of Hungary.

At the beginning of the 20th century, growing democratization of political and social life threatened to overwhelm the monarchy. The call for universal suffrage became the main rallying cry. In the Kingdom of Hungary, only 5 percent of inhabitants could vote. Slovaks saw in the trend towards representative democracy a possibility of easing ethnic oppression and a breakthrough into renewed political activity.

The Slovak political camp, at the beginning of the century, split into different factions. The leaders of the Slovak National Party, based in Martin, expected the international situation to change in the Slovaks' favor, and they set great store by Russia. The Roman Catholic faction of Slovak politicians led by Father Andrej Hlinka focused on small undertakings among the Slovak public and, shortly before the war, established a political party named the Slovak People's Party. The liberal intelligentsia rallying around the journal Hlas ("Voice"), followed a similar political path, but attached more importance to Czecho-Slovak cooperation. An independent Social Democratic Party emerged in 1905.

A map of the federalization of Austria-Hungary planned by Archduke Franz Ferdinand, with Slovakia as one of the member states

The Slovaks achieved some results. One of the greatest of these was the election success in 1906, when, despite continued oppression, seven Slovaks managed to get seats in the Assembly. This success alarmed the government, and increased what was regarded by Slovaks as its oppressive measures. Magyarization achieved its climax with a new education act known as the Apponyi Act, named after education minister Count Albert Apponyi. The new act stipulated that the teaching of Hungarian must be included as a subject in the curriculum of non-state-owned four years elementary schools in the framework of compulsory schooling, as a condition for those schools to receive state financing. Non-government organizations such as the Upper Hungary Magyar Educational Society supported Magyarization at a local level.

Ethnic tension intensified when 15 Slovaks were killed during a riot on the occasion of the consecration of a new church at Černová / Csernova near Rózsahegy / Ružomberok (see Černová tragedy). The local inhabitants wanted the popular priest and nationalist politician Andrej Hlinka to consecrate their new church. Hlinka contributed significantly to the construction of the church, but his bishop Alexander Párvy suspended him from his office and from exercising all clerical functions because of Hlinka's involvement in the national movement. This resulted in a wave of solidarity with Hlinka across all today's Slovakia. The villagers tried to achieve a compromise solution and to cancel the suspensions or to postpone consecration until the Holy See decided about the Hlinka case. Párvy refused to consent, and appointed ethnic Slovak dean Martin Pazúrik for the task. Pazúrik, as well as Hlinka, were active in the election campaign but supported Hungarian and Magyarone politicians and continuously adopted an anti-Slovak attitude. The church had to be consecrated by force, with police assistance. Given where the event occurred, all 15 local gendarmes who participated in the subsequent tragedy were of Slovak origin. In the stress situation, the gendarmes shot dead 15 protesters among a crowd of about 300–400 villagers who tried to avoid the priests' convoy to enter their village. All this added to Slovak estrangement from and resistance to Hungarian rule, and the incident raised international attention on violation of national rights of non-Hungarian minorities.

Before the outbreak of World War I, the idea of Slovak autonomy became part of Archduke Franz Ferdinand's plan of federalization of the monarchy, developed with help of the Slovak journalist and politician Milan Hodža. This last realistic attempt to tie Slovakia to Austria-Hungary was abandoned because of the Archduke's assassination, which in turn triggered World War I.

==== Czechoslovakia ====
===== Formation of Czechoslovakia =====
After the outbreak of World War I the Slovak cause took firmer shape in resistance and in determination to leave the Dual Monarchy and to form an independent republic with the Czechs. The decision originated amongst people of Slovak descent in foreign countries. Slovaks in the United States of America, an especially numerous group, formed a sizable organization. These, and other organizations in Russia and in neutral countries, backed the idea of a Czecho-Slovak republic. Slovaks strongly supported this move.

The most important Slovak representative at this time, Milan Rastislav Štefánik, a French citizen of Slovak origin, served as a French general and as leading representative of the Czecho-Slovak National Council based in Paris. He made a decisive contribution to the success of the Czecho-Slovak cause. Political representatives at home, including representatives of all political persuasions, after some hesitation, gave their support to the activities of Masaryk, Beneš and Štefánik.

During the war the Hungarian authorities increased harassment of Slovaks, which hindered the nationalist campaign among the inhabitants of the Slovak lands. Despite stringent censorship, news of moves abroad towards the establishment of a Czech-Slovak state got through to Slovakia and met with much satisfaction.

During World War I (1914–1918) Czechs, Slovaks, and other national groups of Austria-Hungary gained much support from Czechs and Slovaks living abroad in campaigning for an independent state. In the turbulent final year of the war, sporadic protest actions took place in Slovakia; politicians held a secret meeting at Liptószentmiklós / Liptovský Mikuláš on 1 May 1918.

===== First Czechoslovak Republic (1918–1938) =====
At the end of the war Austria-Hungary dissolved. The Prague National Committee proclaimed an independent republic of Czechoslovakia on 28 October, and, two days later, the Slovak National Council at Martin acceded to the Prague proclamation. The new republic was to include the Czech lands (Bohemia and Moravia), a small part of Silesia, Slovakia, and Subcarpathian Ruthenia. The new state set up a parliamentary democratic government and established a capital in the Czech city of Prague.

As a result of the counter-attack of the Hungarian Red Army in May–June, 1919, Czech troops were ousted from central and eastern parts of present Slovakia, where a puppet short-lived Slovak Soviet Republic with its capital in Prešov was established. However, the Hungarian army stopped its offensive and later the troops were withdrawn on the Entente's diplomatic intervention.

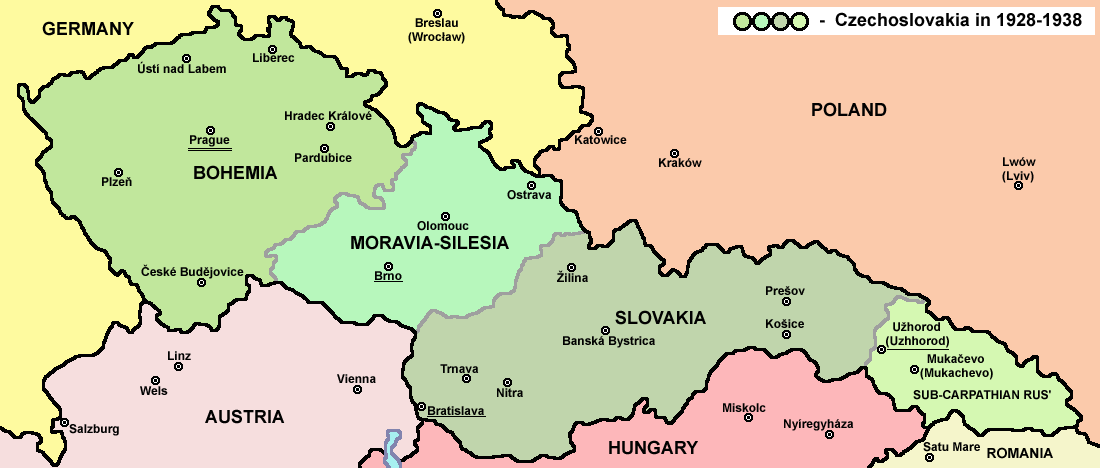
Czechoslovakia in 1928

In the Treaty of Trianon signed in 1920, the Paris Peace Conference set the southern border of Czechoslovakia further south from the Slovak-Hungarian language border due to strategic and economic reasons. Consequently, some fully or mostly Hungarian-populated areas were also included into Czechoslovakia. According to the 1910 census, which had been manipulated by the ruling Hungarian bureaucracy, population of the present territory of Slovakia numbered 2,914,143 people, including 1,688,413 (57.9%) speakers of Slovak, 881,320 (30.2%) speakers of Hungarian, 198,405 (6.8%) speakers of German, 103,387 (3.5%) speakers of Ruthenian and 42,618 (1.6%) speakers of other languages.

Linguistic map of Czechoslovakia in 1930

In addition, in Subcarpathian Ruthenia, which was also included into Czechoslovakia in this time period, the 1910 manipulated Hungarian census recorded 605,942 people, including 330,010 (54.5%) speakers of Ruthenian, 185,433 (30.6%) speakers of Hungarian, 64,257 (10.6%) speakers of German, 11,668 (1.9%) speakers of Romanian, 6,346 (1%) speakers of Slovak/Czech, and 8,228 (1.4%) speakers of other languages. The Czechoslovak census of 1930 recorded in Slovakia 3,254,189 people, including 2,224,983 (68.4%) Slovaks, 585,434 (17.6%) Hungarians, 154,821 (4.5%) Germans, 120,926 (3.7%) Czechs, 95,359 (2.8%) Rusyns and 72,666 (3%) others.

Slovaks, whom the Czechs outnumbered in the Czechoslovak state, differed in many important ways from their Czech neighbors. Slovakia had a more agrarian and less developed economy than the Czech lands, and the majority of Slovaks practised Catholicism while fewer Czechs adhered to established religions. The Slovak people had generally less education and less experience with self-government than the Czechs. These disparities, compounded by centralized governmental control from Prague, produced discontent with the structure of the new state among the Slovaks.

Although Czechoslovakia, alone among the east-central European countries, remained a parliamentary democracy from 1918 to 1938, it continued to face minority problems, the most important of which concerned the country's large German population. A significant part of the new Slovak political establishment sought autonomy for Slovakia. The movement toward autonomy built up gradually from the 1920s until it culminated in independence in 1939.

In the period between the two world wars, the Czechoslovak government attempted to industrialize Slovakia. These efforts did not meet with success, partially due to the Great Depression, the worldwide economic slump of the 1930s. Slovak resentment over perceived economic and political domination by the Czechs led to increasing dissatisfaction with the republic and growing support for ideas of independence. Many Slovaks joined with Father Andrej Hlinka and Jozef Tiso in calls for equality between Czechs and Slovaks and for greater autonomy for Slovakia.

===== Towards autonomy of Slovakia (1938–1939) =====
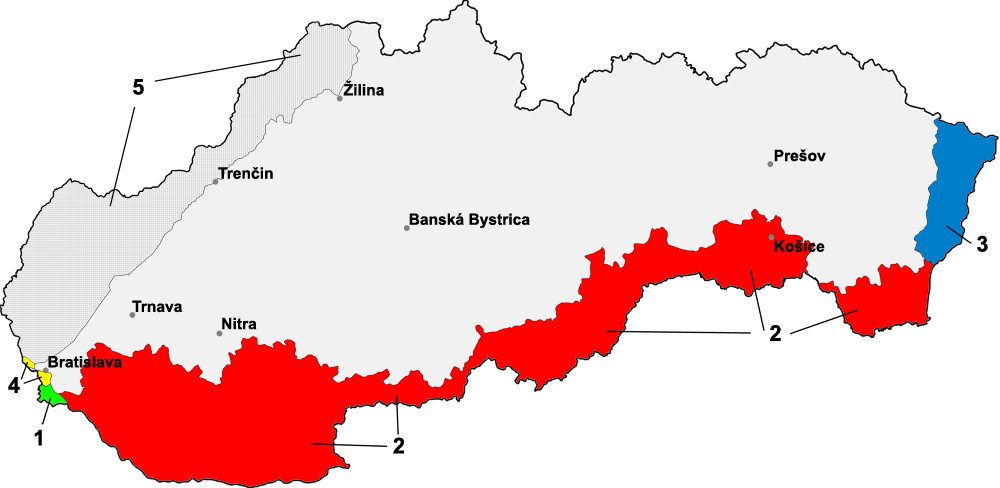
Territorial losses in 1938–39.

In September 1938, France, Italy, United Kingdom and Nazi Germany concluded the Munich Agreement, which forced Czechoslovakia to cede the predominantly German region known as the Sudetenland to Germany. In November, by the First Vienna Award, Italy and Germany compelled Czechoslovakia (later Slovakia) to cede primarily Hungarian-inhabited Southern Slovakia to Hungary. They did this in spite of pro-German official declarations of Czech and Slovak leaders made in October. The Autonomous Land of Slovakia was established within the Second Czechoslovak Republic.

On 14 March 1939, the Slovak Republic (Slovenská republika) declared its independence and became a nominally independent state in Central Europe under Nazi German control of foreign policy and, increasingly, also some aspects of domestic policy. Jozef Tiso became Prime Minister and later President of the new state.

On 15 March, Nazi Germany invaded what remained of Bohemia, Moravia, and Silesia after the Munich agreement. The Germans established a protectorate over them which was known as the Protectorate of Bohemia and Moravia. On the same day, Carpatho-Ukraine declared its independence. But Hungary immediately invaded and annexed the Republic of Carpatho-Ukraine. On 23 March, Hungary then occupied some additional disputed parts of territory of the present-day Eastern-Slovakia. This caused the brief Slovak-Hungarian War.

==== World War II ====
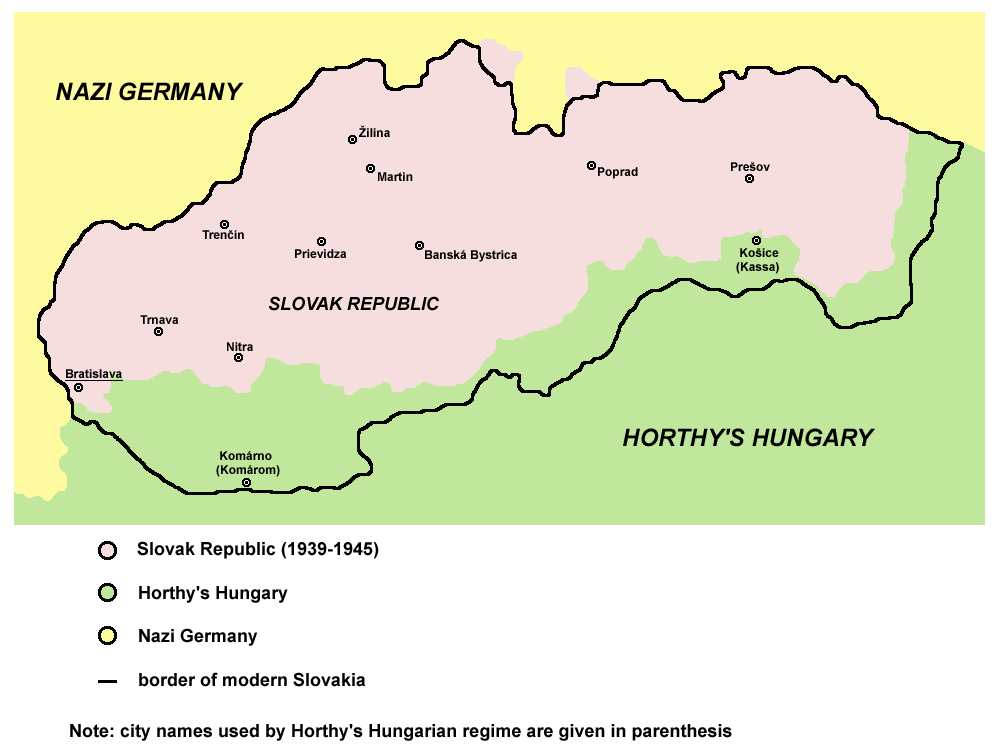
Tiso's independent Slovakia in 1941.

The nominally independent Slovak Republic went through the early years of the war in relative peace. As an Axis ally, the country took part in the wars against Poland and the Soviet Union. Although its contribution was symbolic in the German war efforts, the number of troops involved (approx. 45,000 in the Soviet campaign) was rather significant in proportion to the population (2.6 million in 1940).

Soon after independence, under the authoritarian government of Jozef Tiso, a series of measures aimed against the 90,000 Jews in the country were initiated. The Hlinka Guard began to attack Jews, and the "Jewish Code" was passed in September 1941. Resembling the Nuremberg Laws, the Code required that Jews wear a yellow armband, and they were banned from intermarriage and from many jobs. More than 64.000 Jews lost their livelihood. Between March and October 1942, the state deported approximately 57,000 Jews to the German-occupied part of Poland, where almost all of them were killed in Extermination camps. The Slovak Parliament accepted a bill that retroactively legalized the deportation in May 1942. The deportation of the remaining Jewish population was stopped when the government "resolved" the social problem caused by its own policy. However, 12,600 more Jews were deported by the German forces occupying Slovakia after the Slovak National Uprising in 1944. Around a half of them were killed in concentration camps. Other Jews were rounded up and massacred in the country by Slovak collaborators under German command, at Kremnička and Nemecká. Some 10,000 Slovak Jews survived in Slovakia.

On 29 August 1944, 60,000 Slovak troops and 18,000 partisans, organized by various underground groups and the Czechoslovak government-in-exile, rose up against the Nazis. The insurrection later became known as the Slovak National Uprising. Slovakia was devastated by the fierce German counter-offensive and occupation, but the guerrilla warfare continued even after the end of organized resistance. Although ultimately quelled by the German forces, the uprising was an important historical reference point for the Slovak people. It allowed them to end the war as a nation which had contributed to the Allied victory.

Later in 1944 the Soviet attacks intensified. The Red Army, helped by Romanian troops, gradually routed out the German army from Slovak territory. On 4 April 1945, Soviet troops marched into the capital city of the Slovak Republic, Bratislava.

==== Czechoslovakia after World War II ====
The victorious Powers restored Czechoslovakia in 1945 in the wake of World War II, albeit without Carpathian Ruthenia, which Prague ceded to the Soviet Union. The Beneš decrees, adopted as a result of the events of the war, led to disenfranchisement and persecution of the Hungarian minority in southern Slovakia. The local German minority was expelled, with only the population of some villages such as Chmeľnica evading expulsion but suffering discrimination against use of their language. The Czechs and Slovaks held elections in 1946. In Slovakia, the Democratic Party won the elections (62%), but the Czechoslovak Communist Party won in the Czech part of the republic, thus winning 38% of the total vote in Czechoslovakia, and eventually seized power in February 1948, making the country effectively a satellite state of the Soviet Union.

Strict Communist control characterized the next four decades, interrupted only briefly in the so-called Prague Spring of 1968 after Alexander Dubček (a Slovak) became First Secretary of the Central Committee of the Communist Party of Czechoslovakia. Dubček proposed political, social, and economic reforms in his effort to make "socialism with a human face" a reality. Concern among other Warsaw Pact governments that Dubček had gone too far led to the invasion and occupation of Czechoslovakia on 21 August 1968, by Soviet, Hungarian, Bulgarian, East German, and Polish troops. Another Slovak, Gustáv Husák, replaced Dubček as Communist Party leader in April 1969.

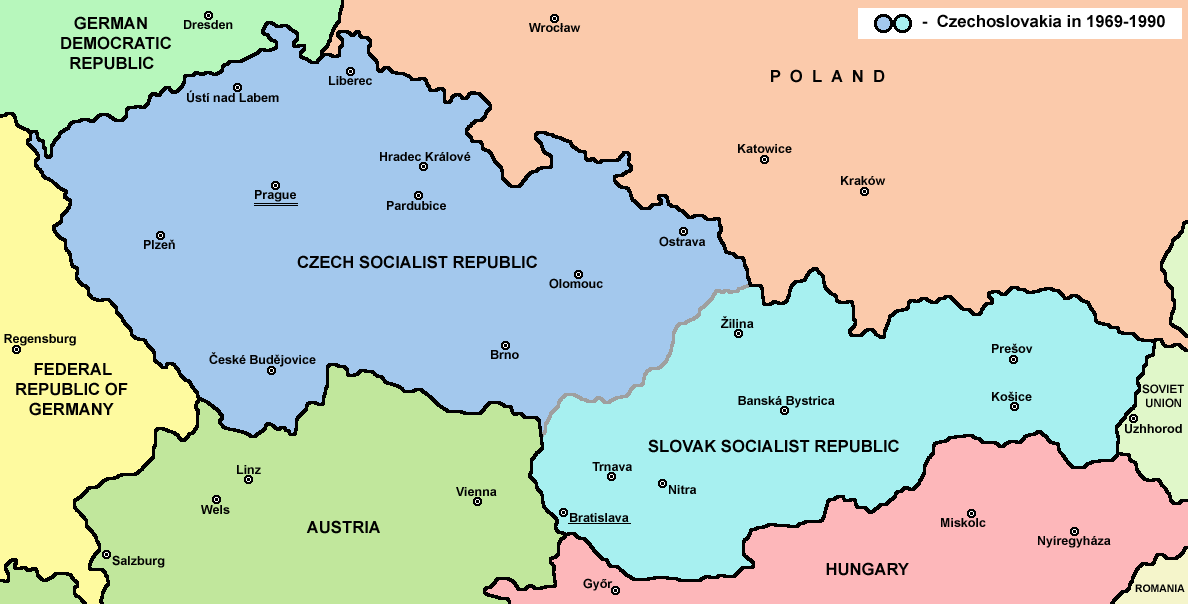
Czechoslovakia 1969–1990.

The 1970s and 1980s became known as the period of "normalization", in which the apologists for the 1968 Soviet invasion prevented as best they could any opposition to their conservative régime. Political, social, and economic life stagnated. Because the reform movement had had its center in Prague, Slovakia experienced "normalization" less harshly than the Czech lands. In fact, the Slovak Republic saw comparatively high economic growth in the 1970s and 1980s relative to the Czech Republic (and mostly from 1994 till today).

The 1970s also saw the development of a dissident movement, especially in the Czech Republic. On 1 January 1977, more than 250 human rights activists signed a manifesto called Charter 77, which criticized the Czechoslovak government for failing to meet its human rights obligations.

==== Velvet Revolution (1989) ====
On 17 November 1989, a series of public protests known as the "Velvet Revolution" began and led to the downfall of Communist Party rule in Czechoslovakia. A transition government formed in December 1989, and the first free elections in Czechoslovakia since 1948 took place in June 1990. In 1992, negotiations on the new federal constitution deadlocked over the issue of Slovak autonomy. In the latter half of 1992, agreement emerged to dissolve Czechoslovakia peacefully. On 1 January 1993, the Czech Republic and the Slovak Republic each simultaneously and peacefully proclaimed their existence. Both states attained immediate recognition from the United States of America and from their European neighbors.

In the days following the "Velvet Revolution," Charter 77 and other groups united to become the Civic Forum, an umbrella group championing bureaucratic reform and civil liberties. Its leader, the playwright and former dissident Václav Havel won election as President of Czechoslovakia in December 1989. The Slovak counterpart of the Civic Forum, Public Against Violence, expressed the same ideals.

In the June 1990 elections, Civic Forum and Public Against Violence won landslide victories. Civic Forum and Public Against Violence found, however, that although they had successfully completed their primary objective – the overthrow of the communist régime – they proved less effective as governing parties. In the 1992 elections, a spectrum of new parties replaced both Civic Forum and Public Against Violence.

== Contemporary period ==
=== Independent Slovakia ===
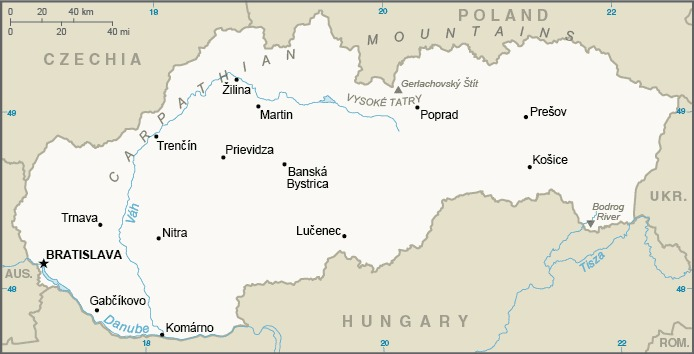
A map of modern Slovakia

In an election held in June 1992, Václav Klaus's Civic Democratic Party won in Czechia on a platform of economic reform, and Vladimír Mečiar's Movement for a Democratic Slovakia (HZDS) emerged as the leading party in Slovakia, on a platform of Slovak autonomy. Mečiar and Klaus negotiated the agreement to divide Czechoslovakia, and Mečiar's party – HZDS – ruled Slovakia for most of its first five years as an independent state, except for a 9-month period in 1994 after a vote of no-confidence, during which a reformist government under Prime Minister Jozef Moravčík operated.

The first president of newly independent Slovakia was Michal Kováč. The first prime minister, Mečiar, had served as the prime minister of the Slovak part of Czechoslovakia since 1992.

Rudolf Schuster won the presidential election in May 1999. Mečiar's semi-authoritarian government allegedly breached democratic norms and the rule of law before its replacement after the parliamentary elections of 1998 by a coalition led by Mikuláš Dzurinda.

The first Dzurinda government made numerous political and economic reforms that enabled Slovakia to enter the Organisation for Economic Co-operation and Development (OECD), close virtually all chapters in European Union (EU) negotiations, and make itself a strong candidate for accession to North Atlantic Treaty Organization (NATO). However, the popularity of the governing parties declined sharply, and several new parties that earned relatively high levels of support in public opinion polls appeared on the political scene. Mečiar remained the leader (in opposition) of the HZDS, which continued to receive the support of 20% or more of the population during the first Dzurinda government.

In the September 2002 parliamentary election, a last-minute surge in support for Prime Minister Dzurinda's Slovak Democratic and Christian Union (SDKÚ) gave him a mandate for a second term. He formed a government with three other center-right parties: the Party of the Hungarian Coalition (SMK), the Christian Democrats (KDH) and the Alliance of the New Citizen (ANO). The coalition won a narrow (three-seat) majority in the parliament. Dzurinda's Second Cabinet (2002–2006) announced strong NATO and EU integration and said they would continue the democratic and free market-oriented reforms begun by the first Dzurinda government.

The new coalition's main priorities were aimed at gaining NATO and EU invitations, attracting foreign investment, and reforming social services such as the health-care system. Vladimír Mečiar's Movement for a Democratic Slovakia, which received about 27% of the vote in 1998 (almost 900,000 votes), received only 19.5% (about 560,000 votes) in 2002 and again went into opposition, unable to find coalition partners. The opposition comprised the HZDS, Smer (led by Robert Fico), and the Communists, who obtained about 6% of the popular vote.

Initially, Slovakia experienced more difficulty than the Czech Republic in developing a modern market economy. Slovakia joined NATO on 29 March 2004 and the EU on 1 May 2004. Slovakia was, on 10 October 2005, for the first time elected to a two-year term on the UN Security Council (for 2006–2007).

The next election took place on 17 June 2006, where the leftist Smer got 29.14% (around 670 000 votes) of the popular vote and formed a coalition with Slota's Slovak National Party and Mečiar's Movement for a Democratic Slovakia. Their opposition comprised the former ruling parties: the SDKÚ, the SMK and the KDH.

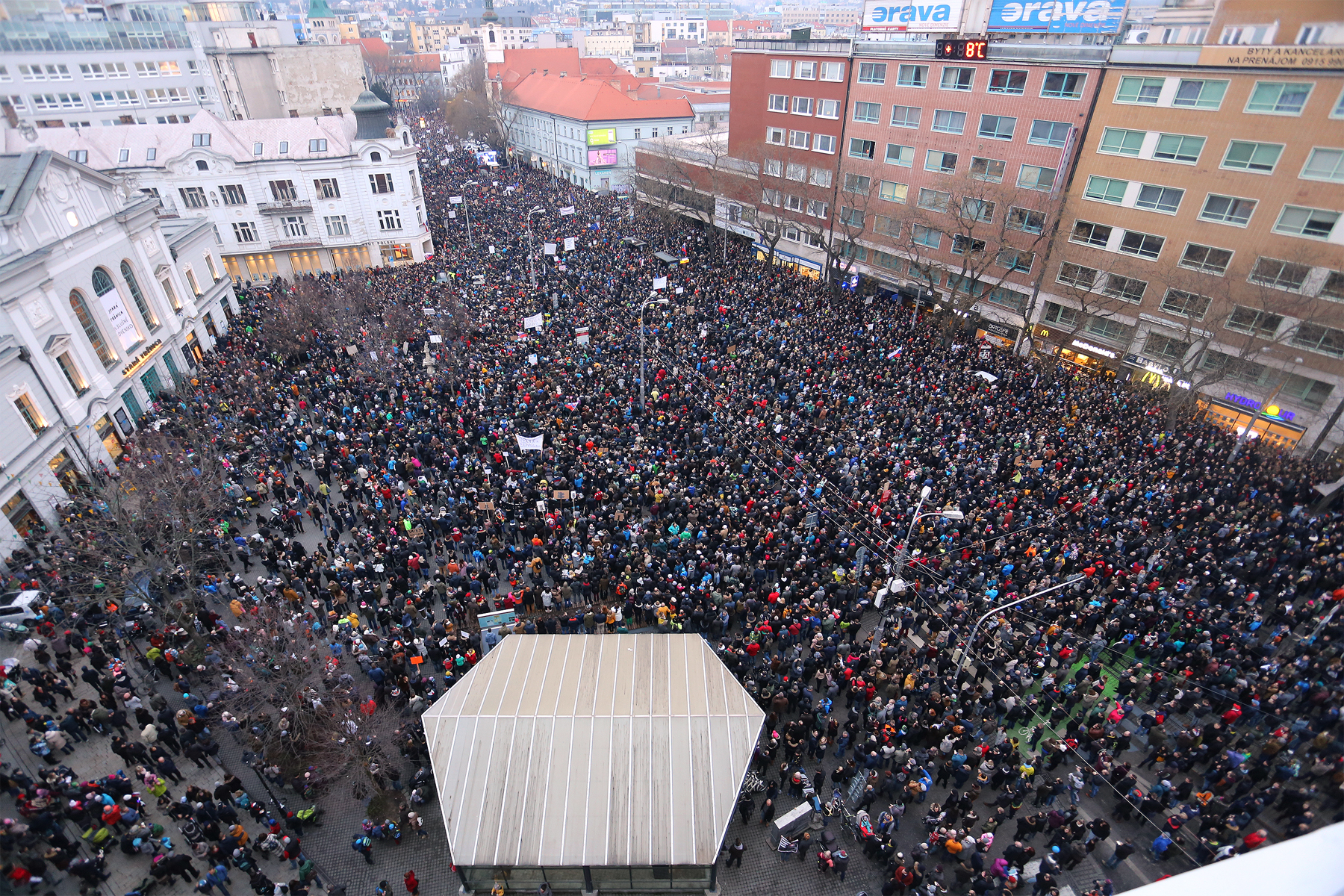
Massive anti-government rally in Bratislava, 9 March 2018

The election in June 2010 was won by Smer with 34.8% but Fico was unable to form a government, so a coalition of SDKU, KDH, SaS and Most-Hid took over, with Iveta Radičová as the first woman prime minister. This government fell after the vote of the European Financial Stability Fund was connected with a no-confidence vote, as SaS argued, that Slovakia, should not bail out much richer countries.

Smer won the election in 2012 with 44,42%. Fico formed his Second Cabinet. It was a single-party government claiming 83 of the 150 seats. It officially supported the position of the EU during the Russian military invasion of Ukraine (2014–present) but sometimes doubted the efficacy of EU sanctions against Russia. In autumn 2015, during the European migrant crisis, the leaders of the four Visegrád Group states rejected the EU's proposal to reallocate 120,000 refugees. The election 2016 took place in March 2016; some days later Fico formed his Third Cabinet, composed of four parties.

Fico resigned as prime minister in March 2018 following the largest street protests in decades over the murder of Ján Kuciak, an investigative journalist who was investigating high-level political corruption linked to the organized crime. President Andrej Kiska appointed Peter Pellegrini to succeed Fico as prime minister.

In March 2019, Zuzana Čaputová was elected as the first female president of Slovakia. She was a member of the liberal Progressive Slovakia party, which had no seats in parliament.

After the 2020 Slovak parliamentary election, the Ordinary People and Independent Personalities won the election and Igor Matovič became the prime minister in March 2020. In April 2021, Eduard Heger was sworn in as prime minister two days after Matovič resigned. Heger was a close ally of Matovič and deputy head of his Ordinary People party. In May 2023, Heger resigned to be replaced by the Central Bank deputy governor, Ľudovít Ódor, as caretaker prime minister of a technocrat government.

In September 2023, populist left-wing Smer-SSD, led by former prime minister Robert Fico, won the general election, taking 79 seats in a 150-seat parliament with its allies, the centre-left Hlas and nationalist SNS parties. The three parties agreed to form a coalition government. On 25 October 2023, Robert Fico became prime minister, announcing that the new government will stop Slovakia's military aid to Ukraine. At his first meeting of EU leaders in Brussels, Fico said that Slovakia will not support further military aid for Ukraine nor support further sanctions against Russia because of the 2022 Russian invasion of Ukraine. In April 2024, nationalist-left candidate Peter Pellegrini, a close ally of Fico, won the presidential election.

At the beginning of 2025, Slovakia experienced the worst cyber-attack in Slovak history on its land registry system, which for days paralysed the functioning of towns, municipalities and banks, as they were not able to access land registry data. Minister of Agriculture Richard Takáč said that there is suspicion that the attack originated in Ukraine. In January 2025, large anti-government protests organised by a protest group Mier Ukrajine (Peace to Ukraine) broke out in Slovakia. On 31 January 2025, the prime minister of Slovakia, Robert Fico, together with the Slovak Information Service, showed photographs of Mamuka Mamulashvili, the leader of the Ukrainian military unit Georgian National Legion, with opposition activist Lucia Štasselová and online news commentator Martin Milan Šimečka, the father of opposition leader Michal Šimečka. Fico accused Šimečka and the government opposition of plotting a coup d'état in the country.

== See also ==
- Communist Party of Czechoslovakia
- History of Bratislava
- History of Czechoslovakia
- History of communism in Slovakia
- History of the Czech Republic
- History of the Jews in Slovakia
- History of the Slovak language
- Politics of Slovakia
- Slovaks in Czechoslovakia (1918–1938)

Lists:

- List of presidents of Czechoslovakia
- List of prime ministers of Czechoslovakia
- List of presidents of Slovakia
- List of prime ministers of Slovakia

General:

- History of Europe

== Sources ==
- Bán, Péter (1989a). Magyar történelmi fogalomtár (A-K) (Encyclopedia of the Hungarian History - A–K). Budapest: Gondolat. ISBN 978-963-282-203-7.
- Bán, Péter (1989b). Magyar történelmi fogalomtár (L-Zs) (Encyclopedia of the Hungarian History - L–Z). Budapest: Gondolat. ISBN 978-963-282202-0.
- Barford, P. M. (2001). The Early Slavs: Culture and Society in Early Medieval Eastern Europe. Cornell University Press. ISBN 978-0-8014-3977-3.
- Bartl, Július; Čičaj, Viliam; Kohútova, Mária; Letz, Róbert; Segeš, Vladimír; Škvarna, Dušan (2002). Slovak History: Chronology & Lexicon. Bolchazy-Carducci Publishers, Slovenské Pedegogické Nakladatel'stvo. ISBN 978-0-86516-444-4.
- Benda, Kálmán, ed. (1981). Magyarország történeti kronológiája ("The Historical Chronology of Hungary"). Budapest: Akadémiai Kiadó. ISBN 978-963-05-2661-6.
- Berend, Nora; Urbańczyk, Przemysław; Wiszewski, Przemysław (2013). Central Europe in the High Middle Ages: Bohemia, Hungary and Poland, c. 900-c. 1300. Cambridge University Press. ISBN 978-0-521-78156-5.
- Boba, Imre (1993). "In Defence of Emperor Constantine Porphyrogenitus". Die Slawischen Sprachen. 32.
- Bóna, István (2000). A magyarok és Európa a 9-10. században ("The Magyars and Europe during the 9–10th centuries"). Budapest: História - MTA Történettudományi Intézete. ISBN 978-963-8312-67-9.
- Bowlus, Charles (2009). "Nitra: when did it become a part of the Moravian realm? Evidence in the Frankish sources". Early Medieval Europe. 17 (3): 311–328. doi:10.1111/j.1468-0254.2009.00279.x. S2CID 161655879.
- Bystrický, Peter (2008). Sťahovanie národov (454 - 568). Ostrogóti, Gepidi, Longobardi a Slovania [Migration Period (454 - 568). Ostrogoths, Gepids, Langobards a Slavs] (in Slovak). Bratislava: Spoločnosť Pro Historia. ISBN 978-80-970060-0-6.
- Čaplovič, Dušan (2000). "The area of Slovakia in the 10th century – Development of settlement, interethnic and acculturation processes (focused on the area of northern Slovakia)". In Urbańczyk, Przemysław (ed.). The Neighbours of Poland in the 10th century. Institute of Archaeology and Ethnology, Polish Academy of Sciences. pp. 147–156. ISBN 978-83-85463-88-7.
- Collis, John (1996). "The first towns". In Green, Miranda J. (ed.). The Celtic World. Routledge. pp. 159–176. ISBN 978-0-415-14627-2.
- Curta, Florin (2001). The Making of the Slavs: History and Archaeology of the Lower Danube Region, c. 500–700. Cambridge: Cambridge University Press. ISBN 9781139428880.
- Curta, Florin (2006). Southeastern Europe in the Middle Ages, 500–1250. Cambridge: Cambridge University Press. ISBN 9780521815390.
- Fügedi, Erik (1986). Ispánok, bárók, kiskirályok (Counts, barons and petty kings). Budapest: Magvető Könyvkiadó. ISBN 978-963-14-0582-8.
- Fusek, Gabriel (1994). Slovensko vo včasnoslovanskom období [Slovakia in the Early Slavic Period] (in Slovak). Nitra: Institute of Archaeology of the Slovak Academy of Sciences. ISBN 978-80-88709-17-6.
- Heather, Peter (2006). The Fall of the Roman Empire: A New History of Rome and the Barbarians. Oxford University Press. ISBN 978-0-19-515954-7.
- Heather, Peter (2010). Empires and Barbarians: The Fall of Rome and the Birth of Europe. Oxford University Press. ISBN 978-0-19-973560-0.
- Kirschbaum, Stanislav J. (1996). A History of Slovakia: The Struggle for Survival. Palgrave Macmillan. ISBN 978-1-4039-6929-3.
- Klein, Bohuš; Ruttkay, Alexander; Marsina, Richard (1994). Vojenské dejiny Slovenska, zv. 1. Stručný náčrt do roku 1526 [Military history of Slovakia, vol. 1.]. Bratislava: Sekcia sociálnych služieb Ministerstva obrany SR. ISBN 978-80-967113-1-4.
- Rábik, Vladimír; Labanc, Peter; Tibenský, Martin (2013). Slovenské stredoveké dejiny I. [Slovak medieval history I.]. Trnava: Filozofická fakulta Trnavskej univerzity v Trnave. ISBN 978-80-8082-599-7.
- Marsina, Richard (2000). "Political Structures in Slovakia from the 7th till the 11th Century". In Egyhazy-Jurovska, Beata (ed.). Slovaks in the Central Danubian region in the 6th to 11th century. SLOVENSKE NARODNE MUZEUM. pp. 93–106. ISBN 978-80-8060-052-5.
- Mistrík, Ján, ed. (1993). "Slovanské jazyky" [Slavic languages]. Encyklopédia jazykovedy (in Slovak). Bratislava: Obzor. ISBN 978-80-215-0250-5.
- Krajčovič, Rudolf (1988). Vývin slovenského jazyka a dialektológia [Evolution of Slovak and dialectology] (PDF). Bratislava: Slovenské pedagogické nakladateľstvo. ISBN 978-80-8082-615-4.
- Kristó, Gyula, ed. (1994). Korai Magyar Történeti Lexikon (9-14. század) [Encyclopedia of Early Hungarian History - 9–14th centuries]. Budapest: Akadémiai Kiadó. p. 467. ISBN 978-963-05-6722-0.
- Kristó, Gyula (1996). Magyar honfoglalás - honfoglaló magyarok ("The Hungarians' Occupation of their Country - The Hungarians occupying their Country"). Kossuth Könyvkiadó. pp. 84–85. ISBN 978-963-09-3836-5.
- Kristó, Gyula; Makk, Ferenc (1996). Az Árpád-ház uralkodói The rulers of the Árpád dynasty. I.P.C Könyvek Kft. p. 30. ISBN 978-963-7930-97-3.
- Kristó, Gyula (1988). A vármegyék kialakulása Magyarországon ("The formation of counties in Hungary"). Budapest: Magvető Könyvkiadó. pp. 21–100. ISBN 978-963-14-1189-8.
- Kristó, Gyula (2003). Nem magyar népek a középkori Magyarországon (Non-Hungarian Peoples in the Medieval Hungary). Budapest: Lucidus Kiadó. ISBN 978-963-9465-15-2.
- Makk, Ferenc (1993). Magyar külpolitika (896-1196) ("The Hungarian External Politics (896–1196)"). Szeged: Szegedi Középkorász Műhely. ISBN 978-963-04-2913-9.
- Nižňanský, Eduard (2010). Nacizmus, holokaust, slovenský štát [Nazism, holocaust, Slovak state] (in Slovak). Bratislava: Kalligram. ISBN 978-80-8101-396-6.
- Novák, Jozef (1994). "Genealógia ako historická disciplína" [Genealogy as a discipline of history] (PDF). In Štulrajterová, Katarína (ed.). Najstaršie rody na Slovensku (in Slovak). Slovenská genealogicko-heraldická spoločnosť pri Matici slovenskej. ISBN 978-80-967103-0-0.
- Pintérová, Beáta (2007). "Príchod Maďarov do Karpatskej kotliny vo svetle archeologických prameňov" (PDF). Acta Nitriensiae 9: zborník Filozofickej fakulty Univerzity Konštantína Filozofa v Nitre (in Slovak). Nitra: Univerzita Konštantína Filozofa v Nitre.
- Ota, Silviu (2014). The Mortuary Archaeology of the Medieval Banat (10th-14th Centuries). BRILL. ISBN 978-900-4281-57-8.
- Pohl, Walter (2004). "Reviewed Work: The Early Slavs: Culture and Society in Early Medieval Eastern Europe by P. M. Barford". Speculum. 79 (2): 448–450. doi:10.1017/s0038713400087996.
- Rustoiu, Aurel (2005). "Dacia before the Romans". In Pop, Ioan-Aurel; Bolovan, Ioan (eds.). History of Romania: Compendium. Romanian Cultural Institute (Center for Transylvanian Studies). pp. 31–58. ISBN 978-973-7784-12-4.
- Spiesz, Anton; Caplovic, Dusan; Bolchazy, Ladislaus J. (2006). Illustrated Slovak History: A Struggle for Sovereignty in Central Europe. Bolchazy-Carducci Publishers. ISBN 978-0-86516-426-0.
- Štefánik, Martin; Lukačka, Ján, eds. (2010). Lexikón stredovekých miest na Slovensku [Lexicon of medieval towns in Slovakia] (PDF) (in Slovak). Bratislava: Prodama. ISBN 978-80-89396-11-5.
- Steinhübel, Ján (2004). Nitrianske kniežatstvo [Dutchy of Nitra] (in Slovak). Bratislava: Veda, vydavateľstvo Slovenskej akadémie vied. ISBN 978-80-224-0812-7.
- Tóth, Sándor László (1998). Levediától a Kárpát-medencéig ("From Levedia to the Carpathian Basin"). Szeged: Szegedi Középkorász Műhely. p. 199. ISBN 978-963-482-175-5.
- Třeštík, Dušan (2001). Vznik Velké Moravy [Foundation of the Great Moravia] (in Czech). Praha: Nakladatelství Lidové noviny. ISBN 978-80-7106-482-4.
- Sussex, Roland; Cubberley, Paul (2006). The Slavic Languages. Cambridge University Press. ISBN 978-0-521-29448-5.
- Teich, Mikuláš; Kováč, Dušan; Brown, Martin, eds. (2011). Slovakia in History. Cambridge: Cambridge University Press. ISBN 978-0-521-80253-6.
- Uhlár, Vlado (1984). "Historik B. Varsík o tzv. juhoslavizmoch v slovenčine" [Historian B. Varsík on So-Called Cugoslavisms in Slovak] (PDF). Slovenská Reč. 49 (2).
- Závodný, Andrej (2013). Vývin slovenského jazyka a dialektológia [Evolution of Slovak and Dialectology]. Trnava: Pedagogická fakulta Trnavskej univerzity v Trnave. ISBN 978-80-8082-615-4.

=== Historiography ===
- Kirschbaum, Stanislav (1996). "A Guide to Historiography in Slovakia". Canadian Slavonic Papers. 38 (3/4). Archived from the original on 22 December 2015 – via Questia.

=== Primary sources ===
- Procopius: History of the Wars (Books VI.16–VII.35.) (With an English Translation by H. B. Dewing) (2006). Harvard University Press. ISBN 0-674-99191-5.
