= Slovenské robotnícke noviny =

Slovenské robotnícke noviny ('Slovak Workers News') was a Slovak-language social democratic newspaper issued from Pressburg, founded in October 1904. The newspaper was economically and politically supported by the Czech social democrats in Vienna. Emanuel Lehocký was the editor of the newspaper.

Criticism from Slovak social democrats against the Social Democratic Party of Hungary that the party had failed to support the Slovak-language labour press led to fragmentation of the party. The following year, the Slovak social democrats founded a party of their own.

In 1908 Lehocký was sentenced to two months imprisonment.
