= Slovak Social Democratic Party of the Kingdom of Hungary =

- Chairperson: Emanuel Lehocký
- Founded: June 1905
- Dissolved: December 1918
- Split from: Hungarian Social Democratic Party
- Merged into: Czechoslovak Social Democratic Workers' Party
- Newspaper: Slovenské robotnícke noviny
- Membership (1908): 6,346
- Ideology: Social democracy
- National affiliation: Hungarian Social Democratic Party (1906-1918)

The Slovak Social Democratic Party of the Kingdom of Hungary, or Slovak Executive Committee, was a Slovak social democratic political party in the Kingdom of Hungary, existing as an independent party from June 1905 to March 1906 and affiliated with the Hungarian Social Democratic Party an autonomous Nationality Committee from 1906 to 1918. Emanuel Lehocký was the chairman of the party. The central organ of the party was Slovenské robotnícke noviny.

The Slovak social democrats had decided at their first congress in Pressburg in June 1905 to form a party of their own, breaking out of the fold of the Hungarian Social Democratic Party. However the Slovak social democrats were unable to wrest control over trade unions, the main source of financial means for the social democratic parties, from the Hungarian Social Democratic Party. Thus the following year the Second Slovak Social Democratic Congress, held in March 1906, resolved to reunite with the Hungarian party as the Slovak Executive Committee. The Slovak Executive Committee rallied Slovak workers in Hungary for the social democratic cause. The organization had a high degree of political autonomy. It sent its own delegations to the congresses of the Hungarian Social Democratic Party. There was however criticism within the Hungarian Social Democratic Party that the Slovak Executive Committee espoused separatism and were funded by the Czechoslav party leadership in Prague.

The 1906 annual congress of the Hungarian Social Democratic Party confirmed the role of the nationality committees in the party. At the time of the Third Slovak Social Democratic Congress held in March 1908 the Slovak Executive Committee represented 6,346 members, organized in trade union organizations in 35 localities and Slovak committees in six cities.

The party merged with the Czechoslovak Social Democratic Labour Party on December 15, 1918. After integration into the Czechoslovak Social Democratic Labour Party in 1918, the Slovak Executive Committee enjoyed substantial autonomy. However, by 1920 the party leadership in Prague curtailed the autonomy of the Slovak branch. It also reduced the number of Slovak representatives in the party leadership from three to one.
