= History of communism in Slovakia =

The history of communism in Slovakia goes back almost 150 years. It is earliest mentioned in 1848 when Marx wrote about self-determination of smaller countries. It existed through political parties, countries, resistance movements, and protests.

== History ==
=== Austria-Hungary (1848-1919) ===
Marx and Engels said that small countries did not need self-determination. The Slovak efforts to be free in 1848 and 1849 were seen as "impeding progress". Thus, they said that Slovakia should assimilate with Germans or Hungarians.

The Social Democratic Czechoslavonic Party in Austria was a political group founded on 7 April 1878 in Austria-Hungary as a regional wing of the Social Democratic Party of Austria. Founded in Břevnov atop earlier social democratic initiatives, such as the Ouls, it represented much of the Kingdom of Bohemia in the Imperial Council.

Lenin said that the self-determination was a step towards eliminating national conflicts that stopped proletarian internationalism. The Slovak socialist movement began outside Slovakia and in Hungary. Thousands of Slovak-speaking workers were living in the capital Budapest, introduced to socialism by the Social Democratic Party of Hungary. Czech social Democrats helped provide inspiration and support to Slovaks, as not many socialist works were in their mother tongue.

=== Slovak Soviet Republic (1919) ===
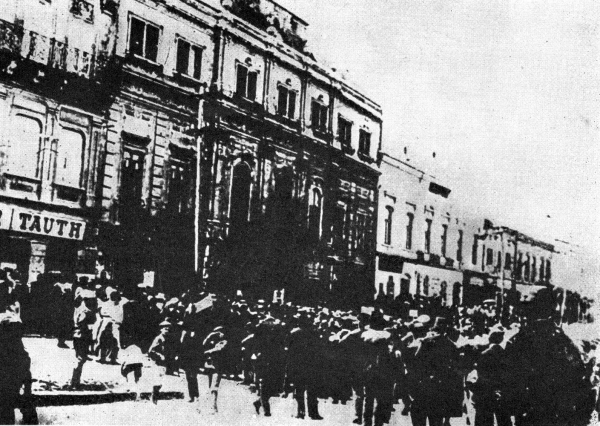
Proclamation of the Slovak Soviet Republic

On 16 June 1919, the Slovak Soviet Republic was formed with its capital in Prešov. It was established with help from the neighboring Hungarian Soviet Republic. The highest Slovak representative proclaimed:

"Today the proletariat in Slovakia has proclaimed a republic; we have seized power, relying on the workers and the armed council of the proletariat."

The government of the SSR issued a decree on the socialization of the means of production, the nationalization of factories with over 20 workers, large estates and financial institutions. It developed a plan for the creation of new production relations in agriculture, stopped the activities of normal courts and replaced them with “revolutionary tribunals”, nationalized schools, established the Slovak “Red Army” and the security corps “Red Guard”. However, due to the short duration of the SSR, these communist measures could not be implemented.

Throughout June, the Paris Peace Conference pressured Hungary to withdraw to its demarcation lines, offering Romania would do the same in turn. Hungary eventually agreed, ceasing hostilities on 24 June, withdrawing to the demarcation line by July. With that the Slovak Soviet Republic also ceased to exist, and its territory was incorporated into Czechoslovakia.

=== Czechoslovakia (1919-1939) ===
Emblem of the Communist Party of Czechoslovakia

In 1921, the Communist Party of Czechoslovakia (KSČ) was formed. It first participated in the 1925 Czechoslovak parliamentary election and got 13.14% of the votes (41 seats), and came in 2nd place. In 1929, the KSČ won 10.2% (30 seats) and came in 4th place. In 1935, they got 10.32% (30 seats) and came in 4th place again.

The KSČ represented Czechoslovakia in the Comintern. As of 1928, the party was the second-largest Comintern member, with an estimated membership of around 138,000, more than twice the membership of the French Communist Party and nearly five times the membership of the Chinese Communist Party at the time. It was only behind the Communist Party of Germany in terms of membership.

The KSČ was banned on 20 October 1938 during the Second Republic.

=== Nazi-occupied Slovakia (1939-1945) ===
In 1939, after the Nazis invaded Slovakia and made it their puppet state, the Communist Party of Slovakia was formed. It was formed as the Slovak branch of the KSČ had been separated from its mother party. It was banned and did not participate in the 1938 election, as Hlinka's Slovak People's Party was the only legal party in Slovakia.

In 1944, the Slovak National Uprising occurred, organized by Slovak resistance members. The resistance movement was represented partly by communists. Slovak partisans fought under Soviet commanders. The uprising was crushed by the Wehrmacht before the Red Army could cross the Carpathian Mountains.

=== Czechoslovakia (1945-1992) ===
==== 1940s ====
After the fall of the Nazis, Slovakia became occupied by the Soviet Union. The Slovak Popular Party was banned as a collaborationist with the Nazis. Other conservative yet democratic parties, such as the Republican Party of Farmers and Peasants (RSZML), were prevented from resuming activities in the postwar period. The Carpathian Ruthenia territory was given to the Soviets as a war reparation, and a treaty was signed on 29 June 1945 that ceded it to the Ukrainian SSR of the Soviet Union. The provisional government was led by a communist prime minister, Zdeněk Fierlinger.

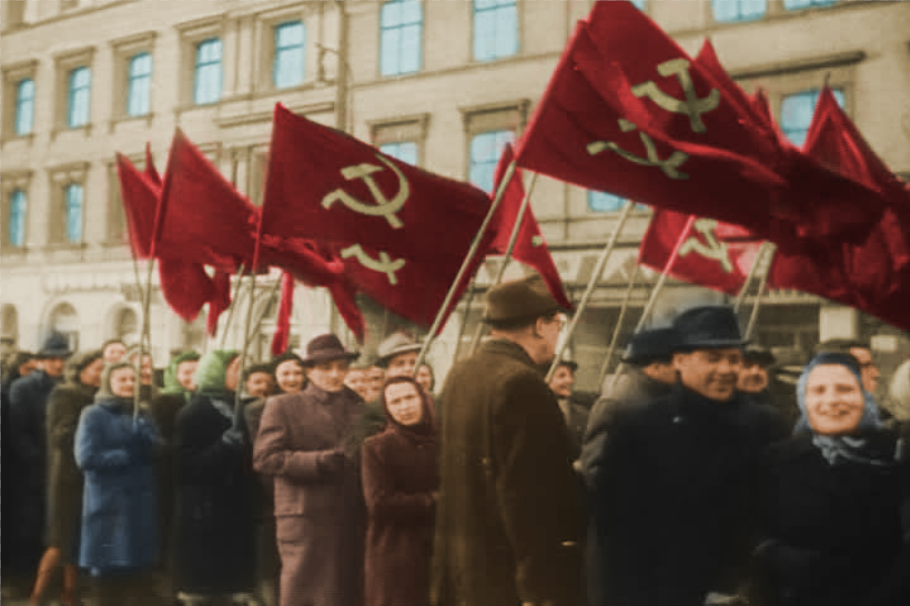
Communists wave red flags with the hammer and sickle in 1947

Parliamentary elections were held in Czechoslovakia on 26 May 1946. The KSČ emerged as the largest party, winning 114 of the 300 seats (93 for the main party and 21 for its Slovak branch) with 38.7% of the vote. The Communist vote share was higher than any party had ever achieved in a Czechoslovak parliamentary election; previously, no party had ever won more than 25%. Voter turnout was 94%.

In January 1948, the communist-controlled Ministry of Interior proceeded to purge the Czechoslovak security forces, replacing nationalists with communists. Simultaneously, the KSČ began agitating for increased nationalisation and for a new land reform limiting landholdings to fifty hectares. In February, the National Police Force was purged of anti-communists. The anti-communists resigned that same month, and on 25 February the president gave all power to the left wing.

On 9 May, a new constitution was approved by parliament, which declared Czechoslovakia a "people's democratic state." Contrary to other socialist states, the KSČ was not even mentioned in the constitution. The constitution created the Fourth Czechoslovak Republic. At the 30 May elections, voters were presented with a single list from the National Front, which officially won 89.2% of the vote; within the National Front list, the KSČ gained an absolute majority of 214 seats (160 for the main party and 54 for the Slovak branch).

==== 1950s ====
A vast rearmament program began in Czechoslovakia starting in 1950, following the start of the Korean War. The armed forces were purged of pro-western individuals, beginning a witch hunt in the officer corp. Starting in 1951, many were arrested and executed the next year. Some 180 politicians in total were executed; thousands more were sent to prison. May 1953 brought a reform that deprived workers and farmers of their savings, and caused riots across the country. The riots were suppressed, and the pro-Stalin faction remained prominent in the country's politics until 1968. The KSČ's secretariatship was merged with the office of the presidency.

==== 1960s ====
Makeup of the Slovak National Council in 1960. Red is the communists, blue is the Party of Slovak Revival, teal is the Freedom Party, and grey are independents.

Stagnation had set in across the country by the 1960s. Production costs were high, fuel supplies were short, quality of goods was poor, and absenteeism. The collective agriculture program produced less in 1960 than all that had been produced in the interwar years. The government adopted a new set of economic principles in September 1964, they had been proposed by a group of reformers. Managers of enterprises would have more say in production and trading, and the command economy would be replaced with more of a mixed economy like Yugoslavia. Agricultural reform began in 1966. Wholesale prices were overhauled in 1967 and 1968. The old tourist rate of exchange was doubled in an attempt to attract tourists. Central planning was cut back on and marketing principles introduced.

The 1960 constitution restricted the authority of the Slovaks, despite claimed rehabilitation of Slovaks that had been purged in the 1950s. The rehabilitated Slovaks began seeking a federal solution by 1963, but the president proposed disciplinary measures. Slovaks were extremely unhappy, and this contributed to his downfall. A Central Committee session in 1967 led to an open clash between the president and Slovaks. The president accused Slovaks of bourgeois nationalism. The president appealed to Brezhnev for aid, but the Soviet leader refused to get involved. The president eventually resigned, and he was replaced with a Slovak successor who was unanimously elected.

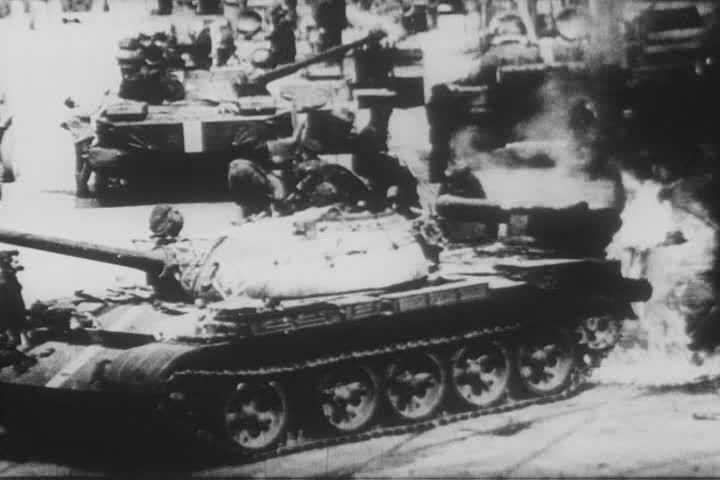
Soviet tanks marked with invasion stripes during the invasion of Czechoslovakia

The Action Programme of April 1968 promoted Slovakia to full parity within Czechoslovakia. The policy of "socialism with a human face" led to protests in Czechoslovakia. The Warsaw Pact invaded Czechoslovakia on 20–21 August 1968, hoping to stop the liberalisation that had gotten out of hand. Despite the fact that the Czechoslovak People's Army was one of the most advanced militaries in the Eastern Bloc, it failed to effectively resist the invasion due to its lack of an independent chain of command and the government's fears that it would side with the invaders as the Hungarian People's Army did during the Hungarian Revolution of 1956. Vladimir Bogdanovich Rezun, then a junior officer who led a Soviet tank column during the invasion, was given absurd information from his commanders about how the people of Czechoslovakia would welcome them as their "liberators", and were instead attacked by angry crowds of people who threw stones, eggs, tomatoes, and apples upon crossing into Slovakia. By the morning of 21 August, Czechoslovakia was occupied. 19 Slovaks died. Czechoslovakia was proclaimed a federal republic following the defeat of the reformers; the Czech Socialist Republic and Slovak Socialist Republic were both formed with separate parliaments and governments.

==== 1970s ====
The 1970s brought about a period described as "normalization." The Brezhnev Doctrine was amended into the constitution and Gustáv Husák repudiated the Prague Spring. The industrial and agricultural reforms of the Action Programme were not followed through on, however, and this led to a period of failure for Czechoslovakia's long-term economic planning.

==== 1980s ====
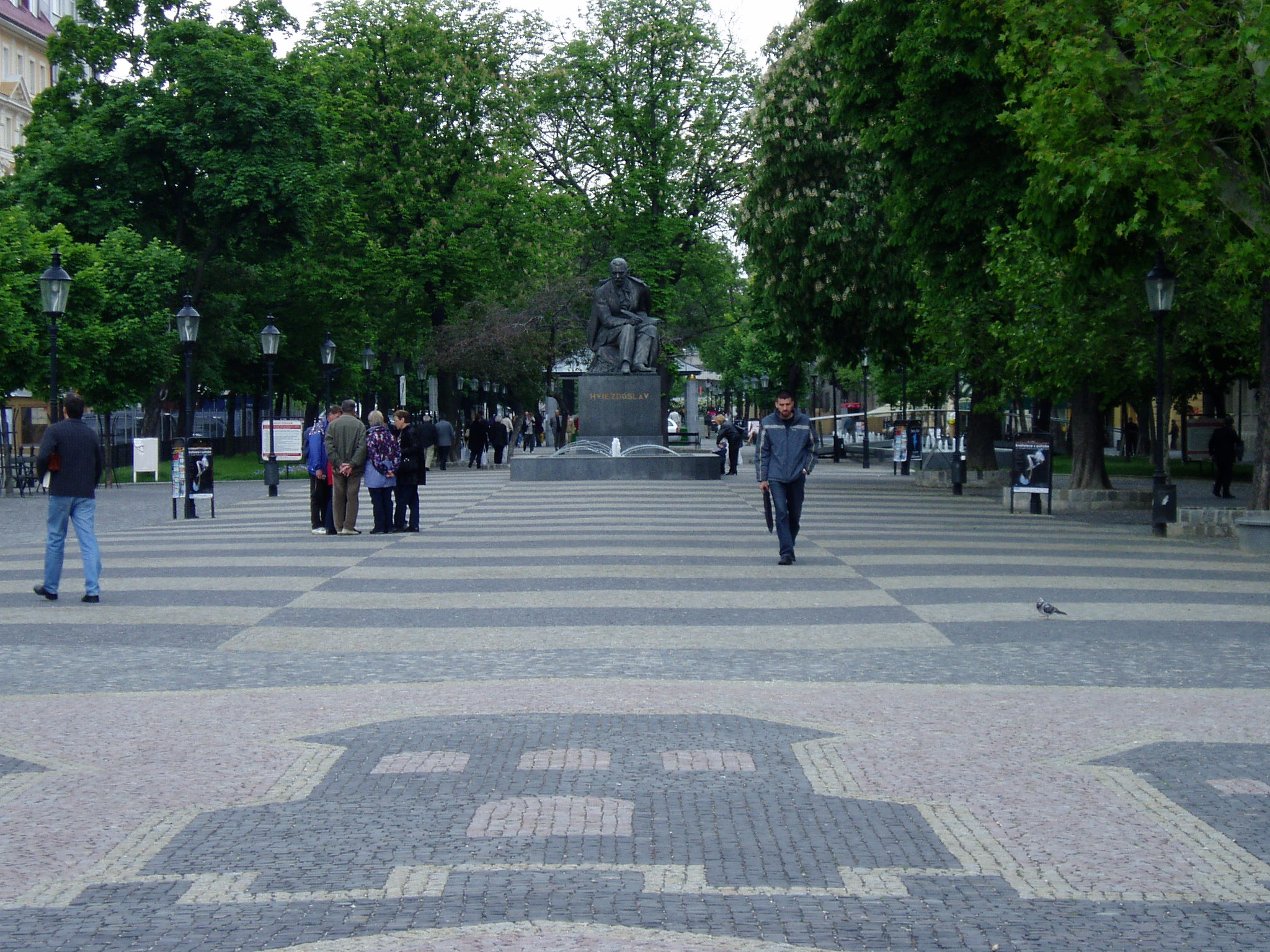
The plaza of the Candle Demonstration today

The economic planning issues continued into the 1980s. There was a large protest gathering on 25 March 1988 in Bratislava, dubbed the Candle Demonstration. Thousands of Slovaks held candles to show their support for religious freedom. Police dispersed the protests with water and made multiple arrests.

The Gentle Revolution of 1989 brought an end to communism in Czechoslovakia. Students gathered for mass protests in Bratislava on 16 November. An organization called Public Against Violence was formed in Slovakia on 19 November, and was a sister group to the Civic Forum in Czechia. Public Against Violence served as a broad front against communism. Like Civic Forum, Public Against Violence called for the dominant role of the Communist Party to end and to establish a provisional government composed both of communists and the opposition, leading to free elections. However Public Against Violence also called for relations between the Czechs and Slovaks to be altered in a new democratic federation.

Protests spread across Slovakia in November 1989 with branches of Public Against Violence being founded in many towns. Civic Forum and Public Against Violence worked together in negotiations with the Communist government, with Ján Čarnogurský representing Public Against Violence at talks together with Václav Havel for Civic Forum. After a two-hour general strike on 27 November demonstrated support for the opposition, agreement was reached on the 29 November for the leading role of the Communist Party to be ended.

==== 1990s ====
June 1990 brought free elections to Czechoslovkia. Civic Forum came first, the communist party second, and Public Against Violence third. When issues dividing Czechs and Slovaks were discussed, the existence of several legislatures made it extremely difficult to find a federal majority. Additionally, the minority bloc of Slovak deputies had disproportionate veto power. The 1992 parliamentary elections gave the Slovak premiership to Vladimir Mečiar, a man who was a Slovak nationalist, a member of Public Against Violence, and leader of Movement for a Democratic Slovakia.

The goal of negotiations switched to achieving a peaceful division. Peaceful division was prioritized as the process ran in parallel with the violent breakup of Yugoslavia. On 13 November, the Czechoslovak Federal Assembly passed Constitution Act 541, which settled the division of property between the Czech lands and Slovakia. With Constitution Act 542, passed on 25 November, they agreed to the secession of Czechoslovakia into two entities as of 31 December 1992.

=== Slovakia (1993-2025) ===
Logo of the Communist Party of Slovakia

The Slovak Republic was formed on 1 January 1993.

Following the June 1992 elections, ZKS and KSS '91 speeded up the process of uniting the two parties. At an unification congress held in Banská Bystrica held on August 29, 1992 (anniversary of the Slovak National Uprising), ZKS and KSS '91 merged into a new Communist Party of Slovakia (KSS). The new KSS inherited the legal personality of ZKS. Vladimír Ďaďo of KSS '91 became the chairman of the new party and Ladislav Jača of ZKS the General Secretary.

The Communist Party of Slovakia (KSS), the successor to the communist party, was formed in 1992 through the merger of the Communist Party of Slovakia – 91 and the Communist League of Slovakia. Its first election to win seats was in 2002, winning 11 seats in the National Council. The KSS won no other seats in any other elections.
