= Uyvar Eyalet =

Administrative division of the Ottoman Empire from 1663 to 1685

Uyvar Eyalet Eyalet-i Uyvar
- Eyalet of the Ottoman Empire
- 1663–1685
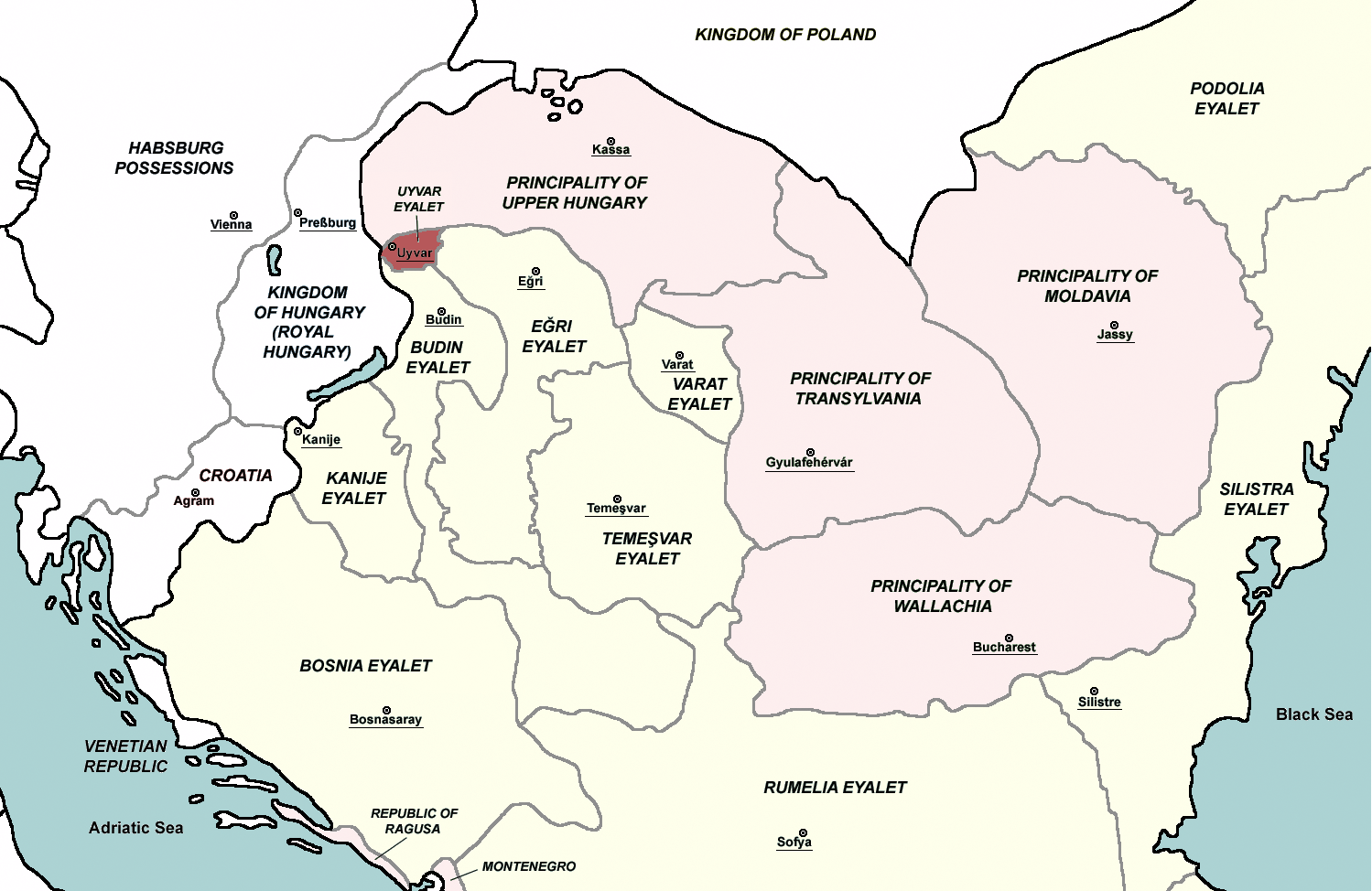
- The Uyvar Eyalet in 1683
- Capital: Uyvar (Nové Zámky)
- Area
  - Coordinates: 47°59′N 18°9′E
- History
  - Austro-Turkish War (1663–1664): 1663
  - Disestablished: 1685
Preceded by	Succeeded by
Habsburg Monarchy	Habsburg Monarchy
- Today part of: Slovakia, Hungary

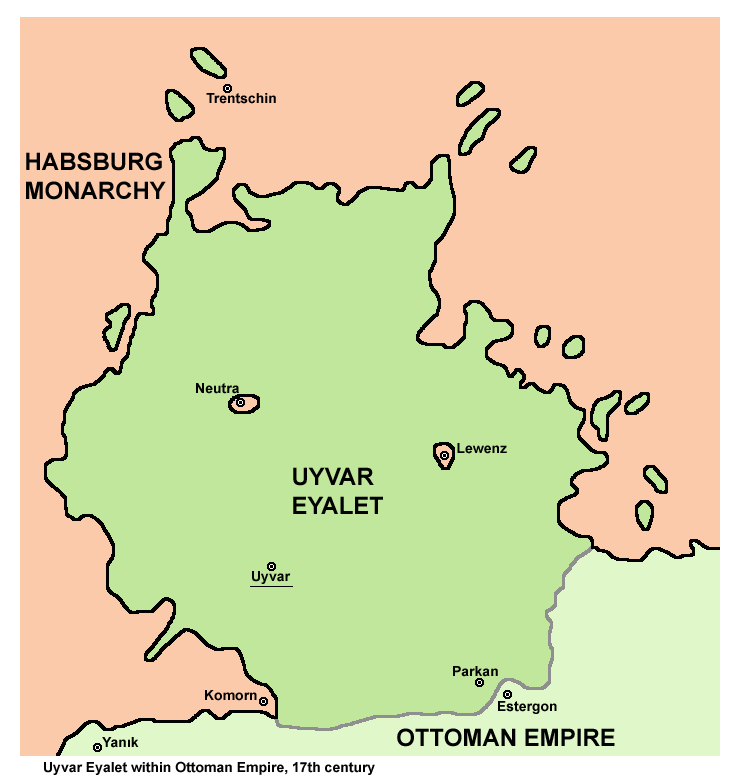
Map of the Uyvar Eyalet

Uyvar Eyalet (Ottoman Turkish: ایالت اویوار; Eyālet-i Uyvar) was an eyalet of the Ottoman Empire.

It was established during the reign of Mehmed IV. In 1663, an Ottoman expeditionary force, led by Köprülü Fazıl Ahmed, defeated the Habsburg Monarchy's garrison of the city of Uyvar (today known as Nové Zámky, Slovakia) and conquered the region. In 1664, they lost the northern part along with the fortresses Hlohovec, Nitra and Levice. The Peace of Vasvár recognised Ottoman control over the remaining part of the eyalet. It was returned to Austria after the signing of the Treaty of Karlowitz in 1699.

Residents of Uyvar paid 50 Akçe per head for Jizya as compared to the standard rate of one gold ducat (equivalent in the period to around 200 Akçe). The province paid a yearly sum of 1,090,150 Akçe to the treasury by 20,183 non-Muslim Jizya payers, amounting to 50 Akçe per head.

== Administrative divisions ==
The sanjaks of Uyvar Eyalet in the 17th century:

1. Sanjak of Litova
2. Sanjak of Novigrad
3. Sanjak of Hulichk
4. Sanjak of Boyak
5. Sanjak of Shaswar
