= David of Hungary =

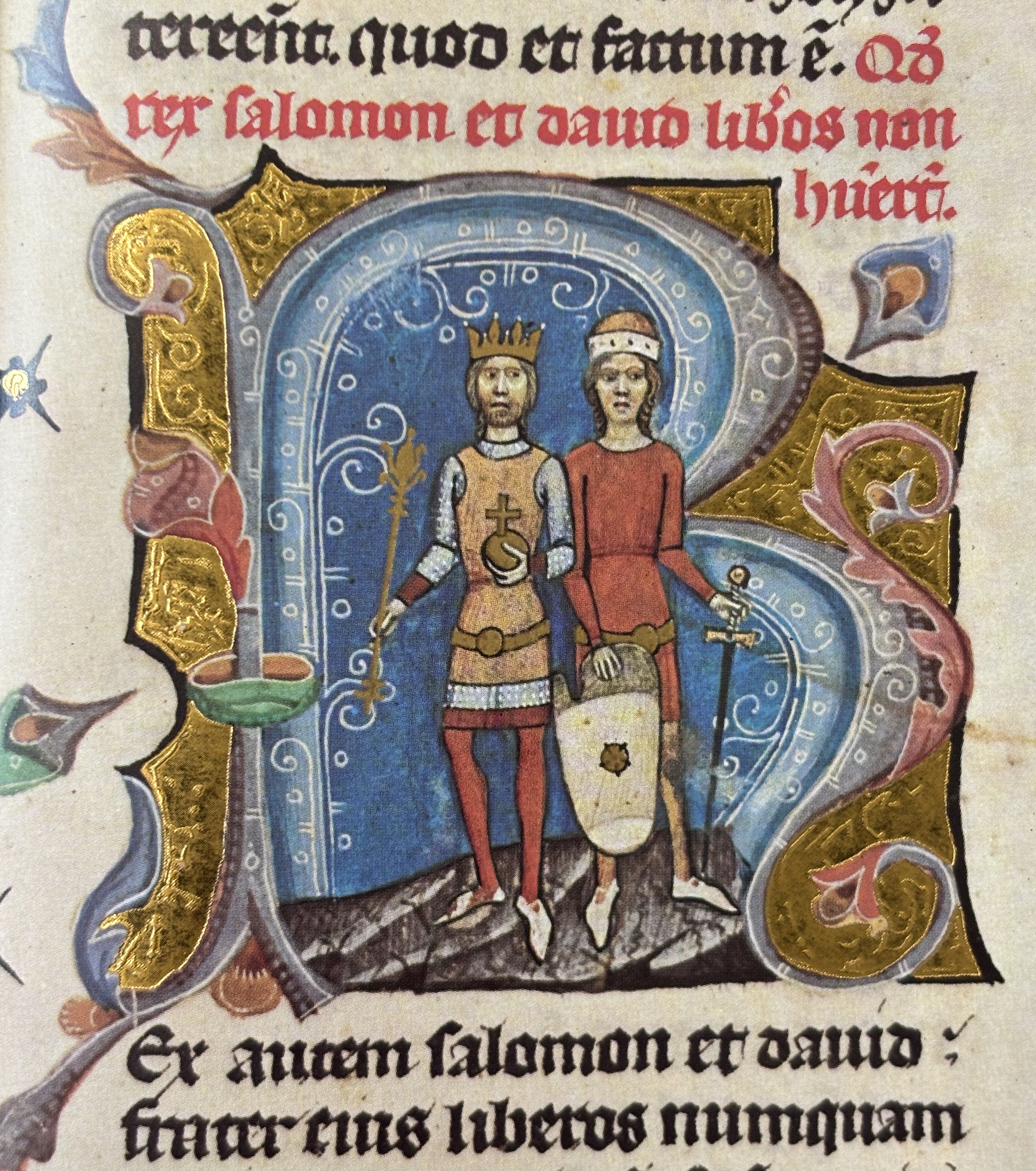
King Solomon with his brother David (Chronicon Pictum)

David of Hungary (Hungarian: Dávid; between 1053 and 1055 – after 1094) was a member of the Árpád dynasty as the second son of Andrew I of Hungary and Anastasia of Kiev.

David's exact birth date is unknown. His elder brother, Solomon was born in 1053 and the establishing charter of the abbey of Tihany (1055) clarifies that Andrew I has 'sons', thus David perhaps was born between the two dates.

During the civil war between his father and Prince Béla, Queen Anastasia took refuge with her two sons in Austria, where they resided until 1063, when Béla I died in an accident. David did not participate in the battle for the throne, involving his brother and his cousins, Géza and Ladislaus, and did not deal with politics. According to historian Mór Wertner, David was a member of the clerical order in 1094. In the same year he donated a large sum of money to the Abbey of Tihany, which had been founded by his father, Andrew I in 1055. Probably he died shortly, as the tone of the charter of donation was formulated as a testament. In 1095, when King Ladislaus I died, according to the contemporary records, only princes Lampert, Coloman and Álmos survived the king. David was buried in Tihany, next to his father.

== Sources ==
- Wertner, Mór: "Dávid herczeg". In: W. M.: Az Árpádok családi története, Nagy-Becskerek, Pleitz Ferencz Pál Könyvnyomdája, 1892, 134–136.
