= Tihany =

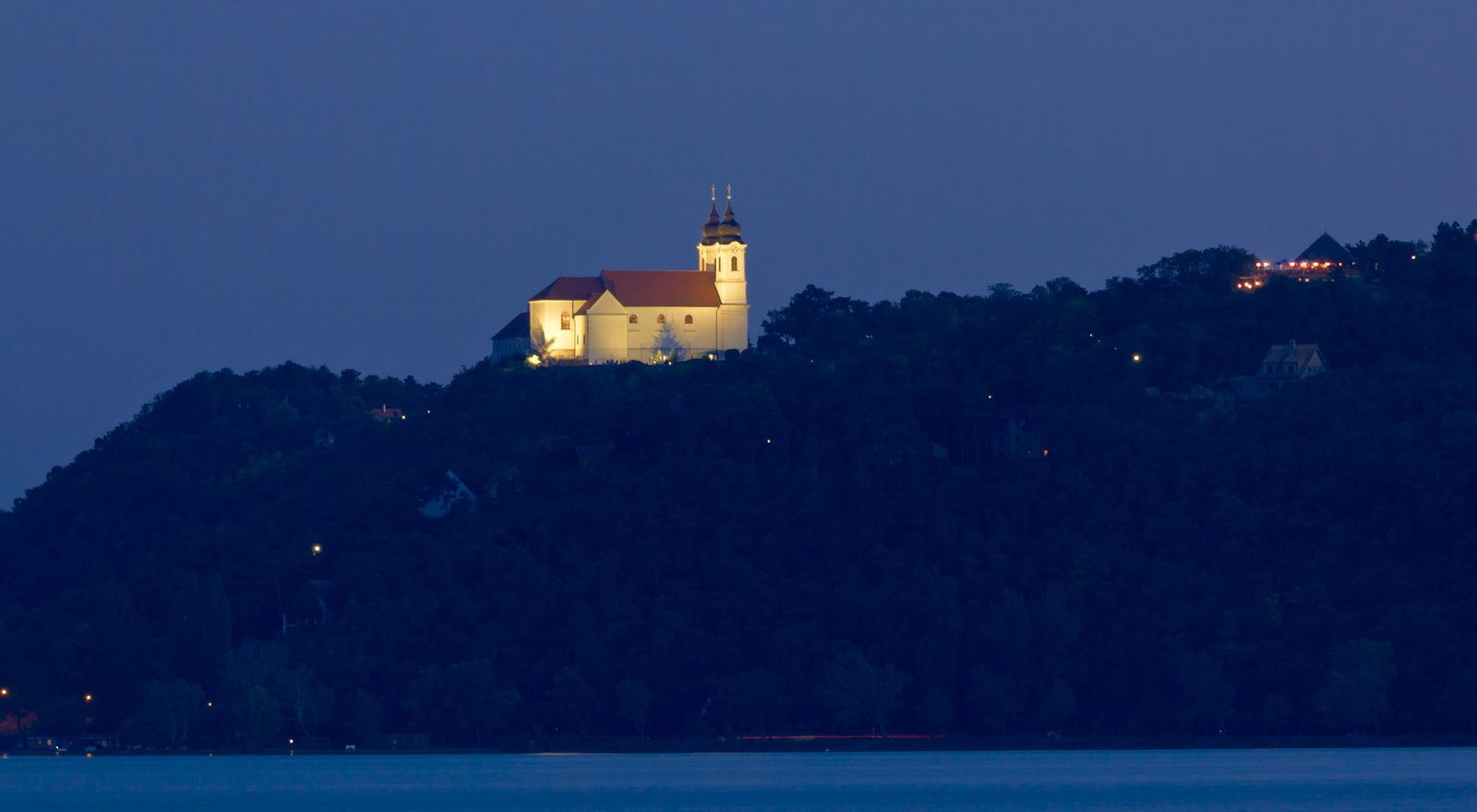
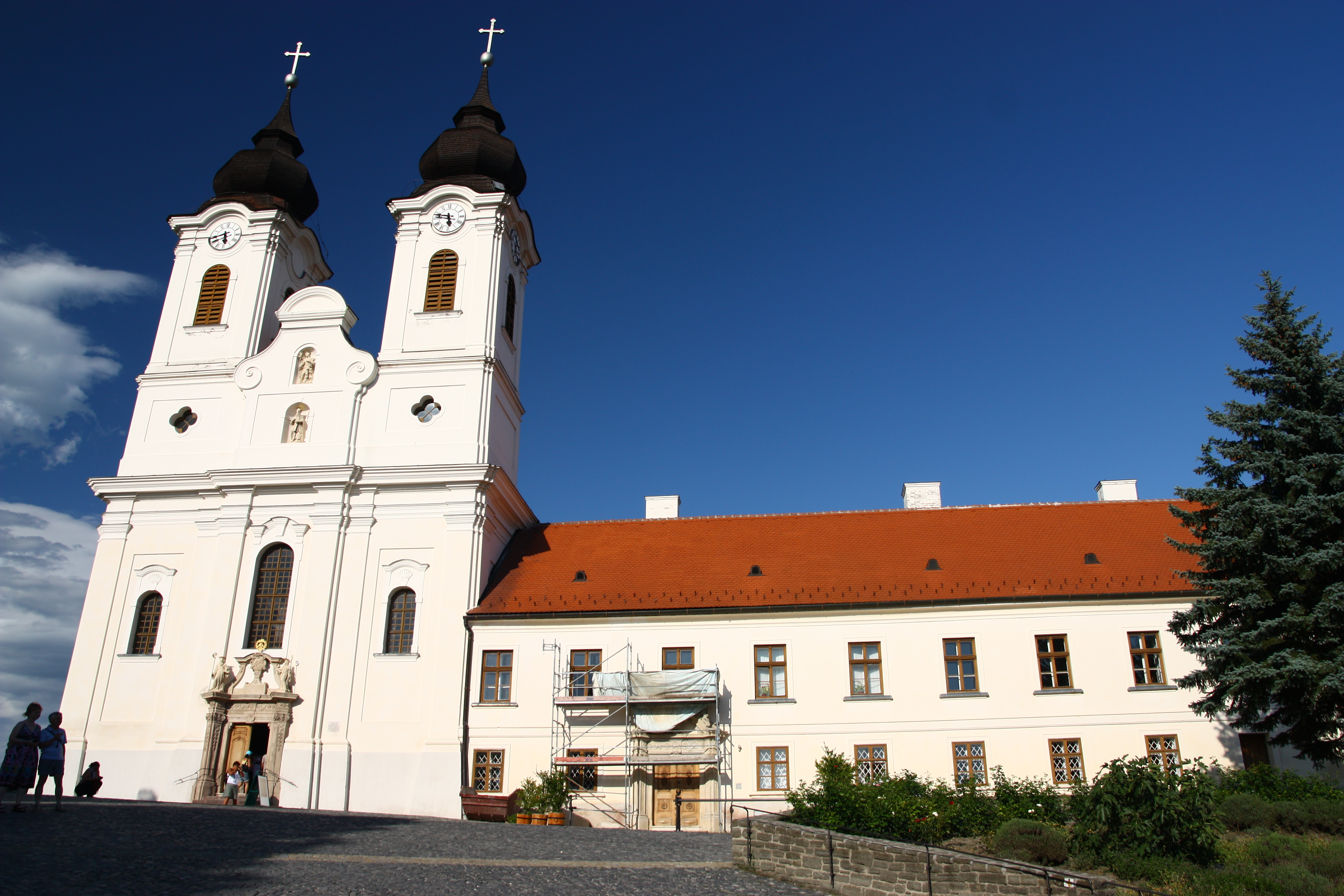
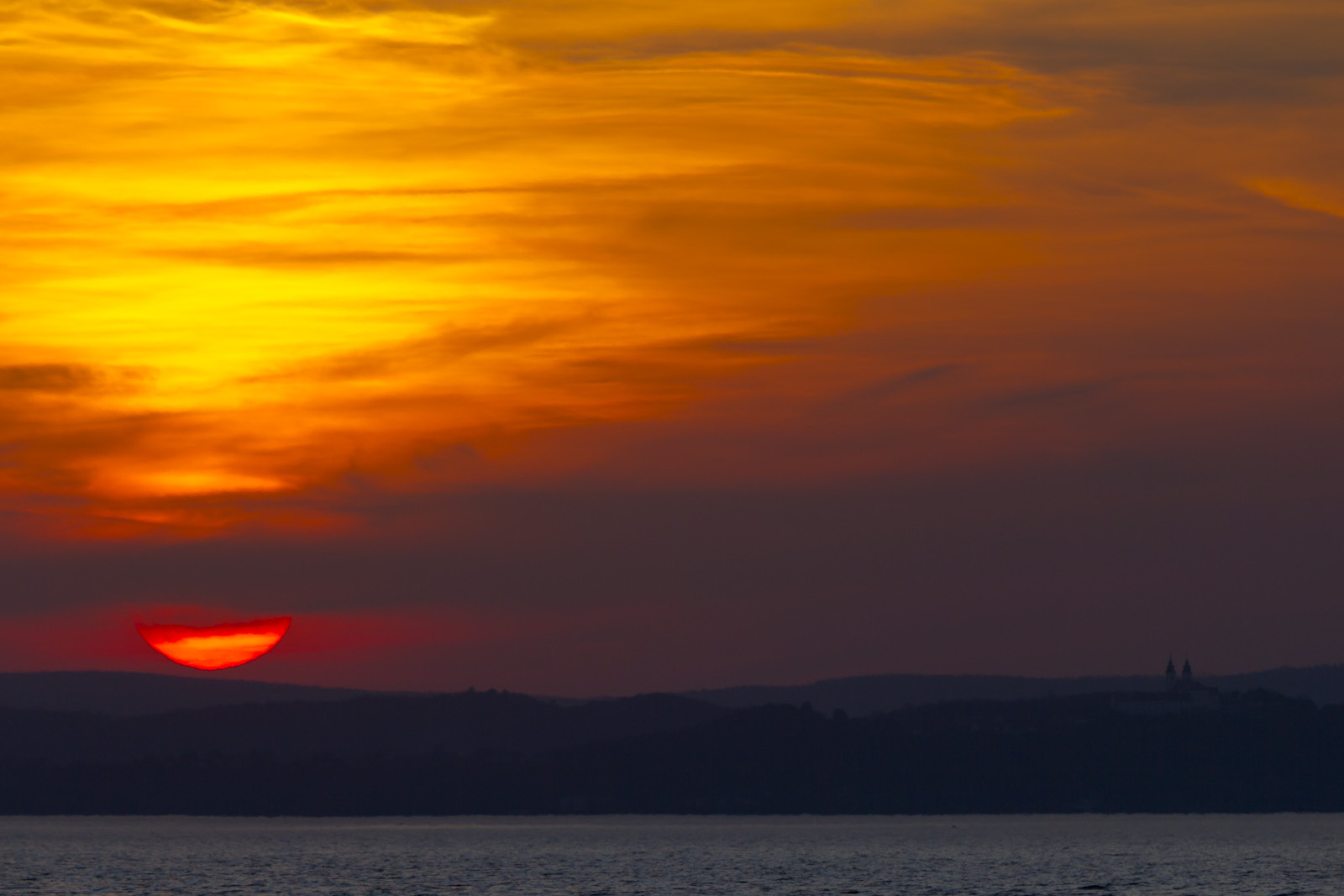

- Flag Coat of arms

- Location of Veszprém county in Hungary
- Interactive map of Tihany
- Location of Tihany
- Coordinates: 46.90891°N 17.87923°E
- Country: Hungary
- County: Veszprém

Area
  - Total: 27.33 km^{2} (10.55 sq mi)

Population (2025)
  - Total: 1,330
  - Density: 48.7/km^{2} (126/sq mi)
- Time zone: UTC+1 (CET)
  - Summer (DST): UTC+2 (CEST)
- Postal code: 8237
- Area code: 87

Tihany (Hungarian: [ˈtihɒɲ]) is a village on the northern shore of Lake Balaton on the Tihany Peninsula (Hungary, Veszprém County). The whole peninsula is a historical district.

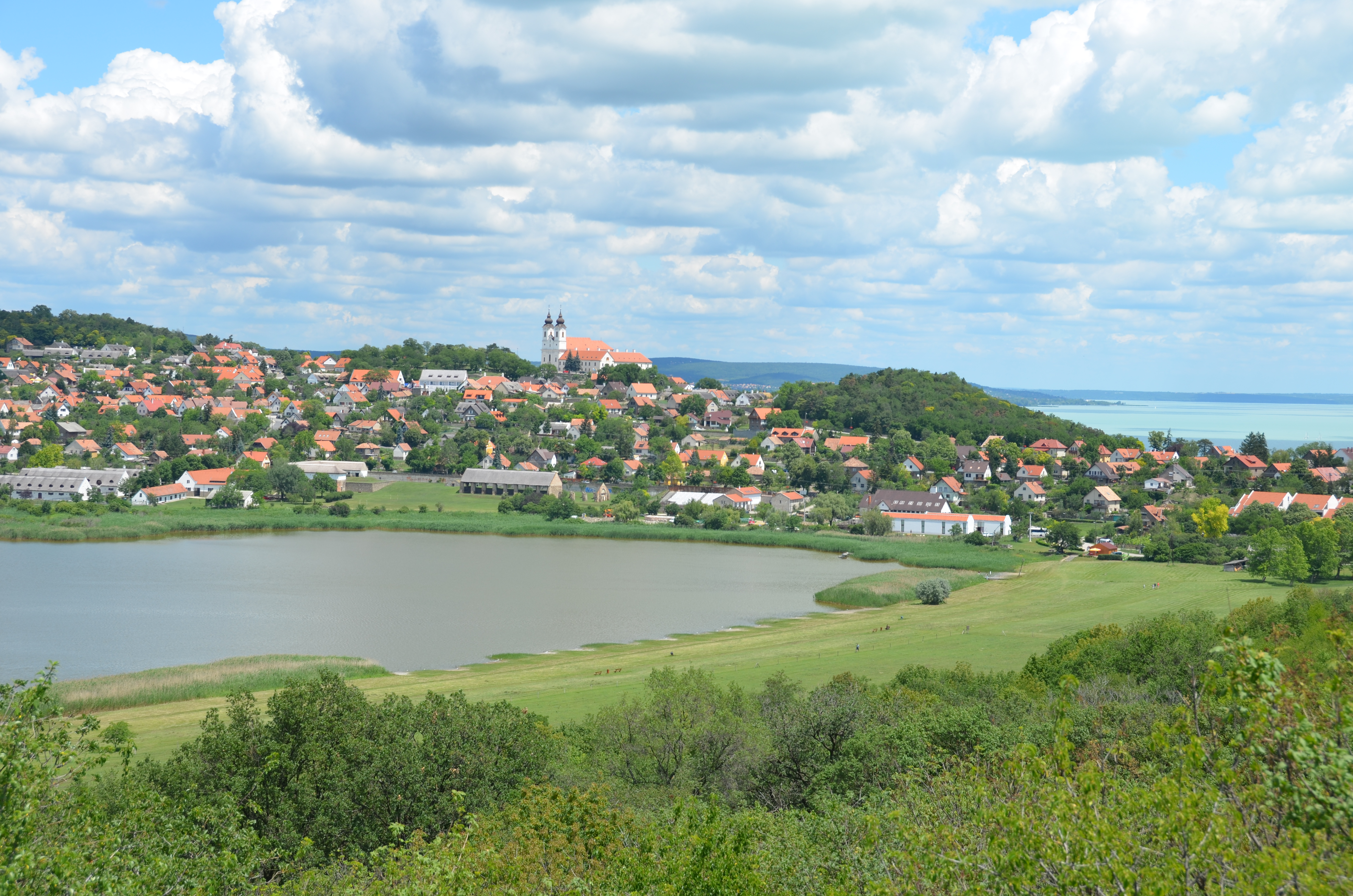
View from Tihany Belső-tó

The center of the district is the Benedictine Tihany Abbey, which was founded in 1055 AD by András (Andrew) I, who is buried in the crypt. The founding charter of this abbey is the first extant record of Hungarian language, preserved in Pannonhalma Benedictine Archabbey. The church itself was rebuilt in baroque style in 1754. The still functioning abbey is a popular tourist attraction due to its historical and artistic significance. It also has the best view of Lake Balaton.

The abbey also features as a footnote in Habsburg history - the last Habsburg Emperor of Austria, Charles I was held prisoner here following his second attempt to regain the throne of Hungary. He was later sent to exile to Madeira in Portugal.

Tihany is famous for the echo, existing since the 18th century. There were poems written for this echo, like by Mihály Csokonai Vitéz and Mihály Vörösmarty, but the most famous is by János Garay, summing up the legend of the place. The echo has since abated, due to changes in the landscape. The other part of the legend concerns with the "goats' nails", washed ashore from Balaton, which are in fact corners of prehistoric clams. According to the story, there was a princess with golden-haired goats, but she was too proud and hard of heart and was punished (cursed by the king of the lake): her goats were lost in Balaton, only their nails remained, and she was obliged to answer to every passers-by. A stone, remembering the Shouting Girl, is still to be seen near the village. On the shores of Lake Balaton stands the former summer residence of the Habsburg imperial family, which remained in the private ownership of the family until the end of the Second World War. It has since been used as a hotel, but is now in private hands and not accessible to the public.

Tihany's inhabitants have the highest per capita income, and the village has the highest housing prices in the whole of Hungary.

== Etymology ==
The name comes from the Slavic Tichoň: quiet, a silent man (derived from ticho: silence). 1055 Tihon.

== Gallery ==
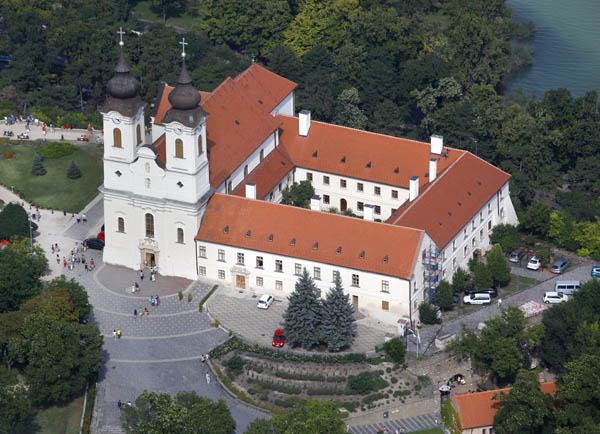
Tihany Abbey

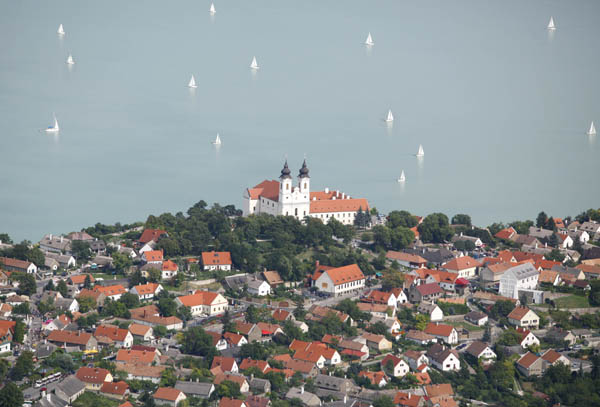
Tihany

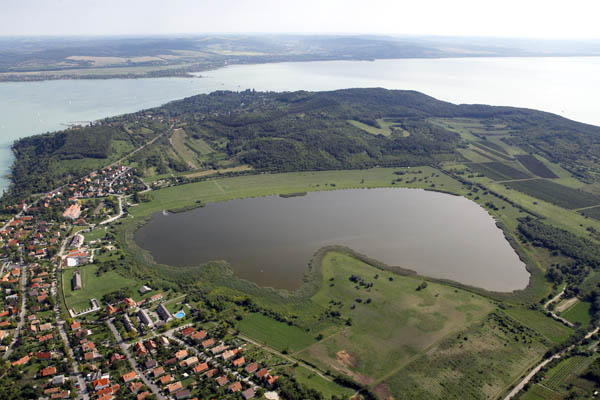
Inner Lake

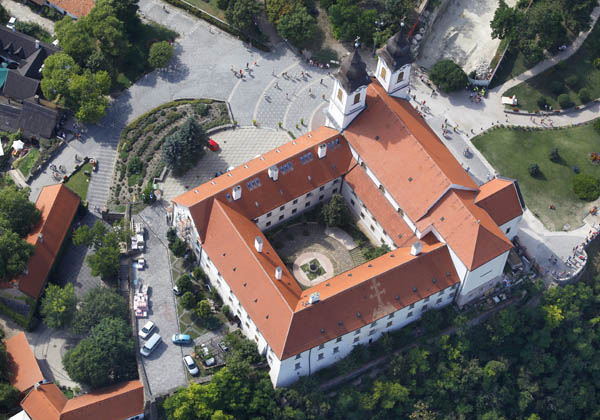

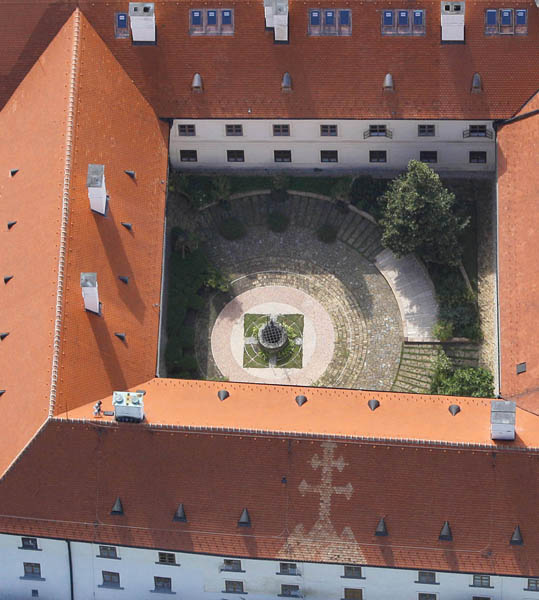

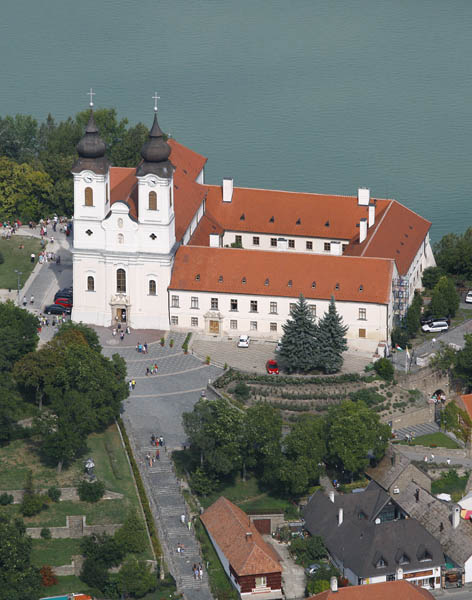

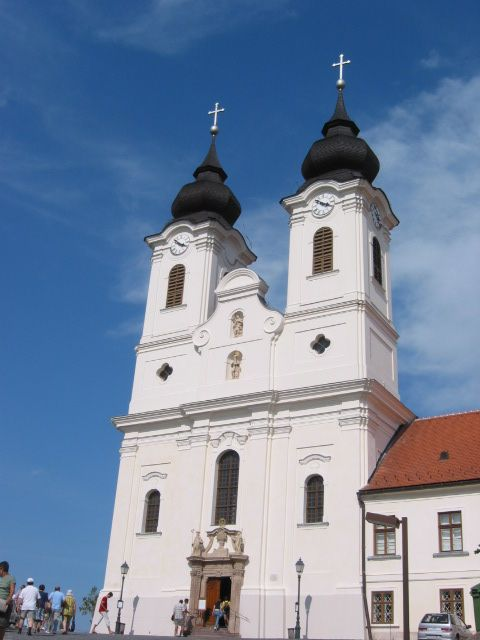
Tihany Abbey

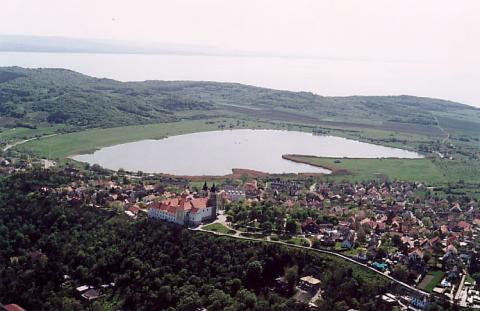
Tihany from birdview with Belső-tó

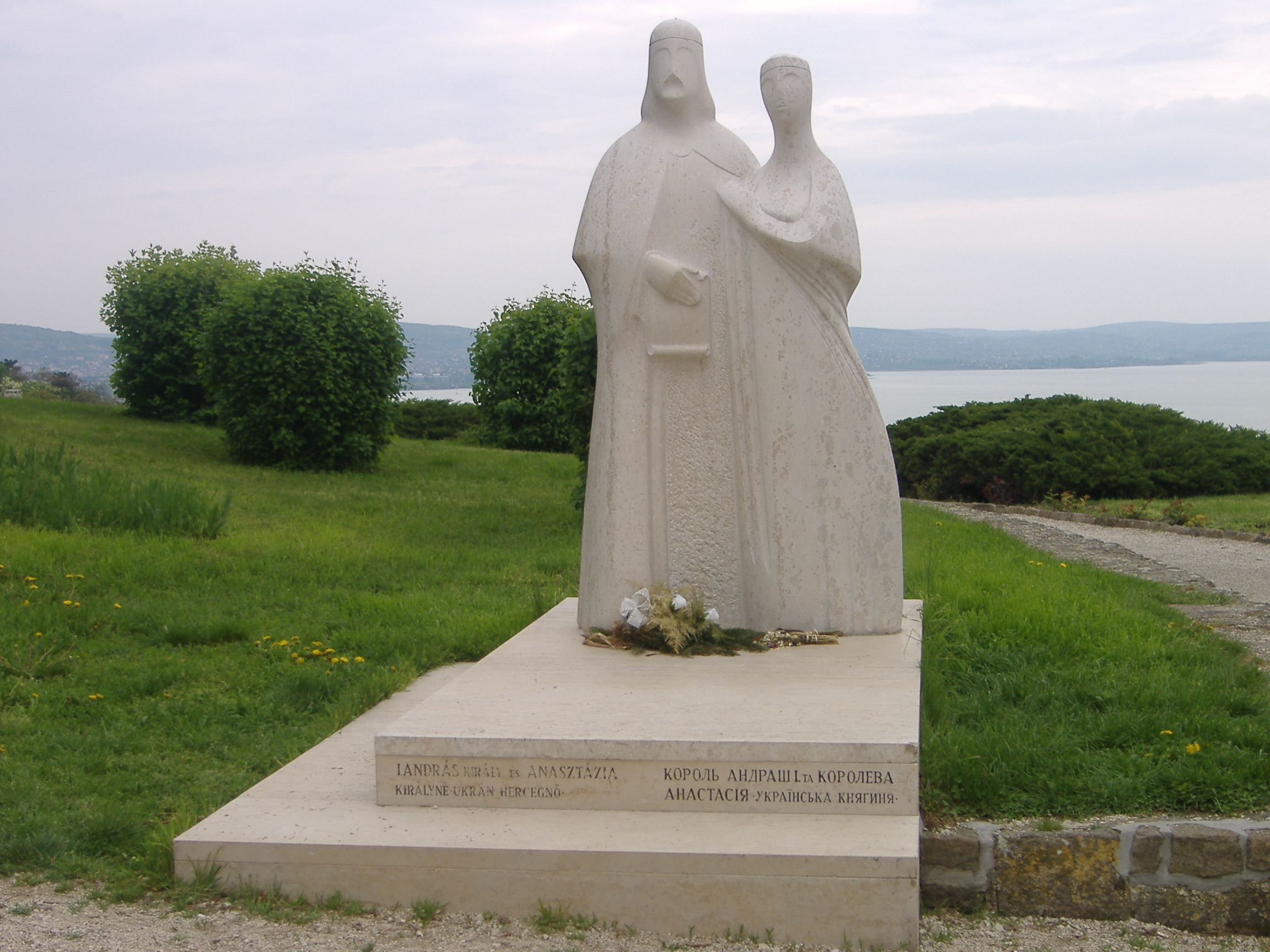
Statue of Andrew I and Anastasia

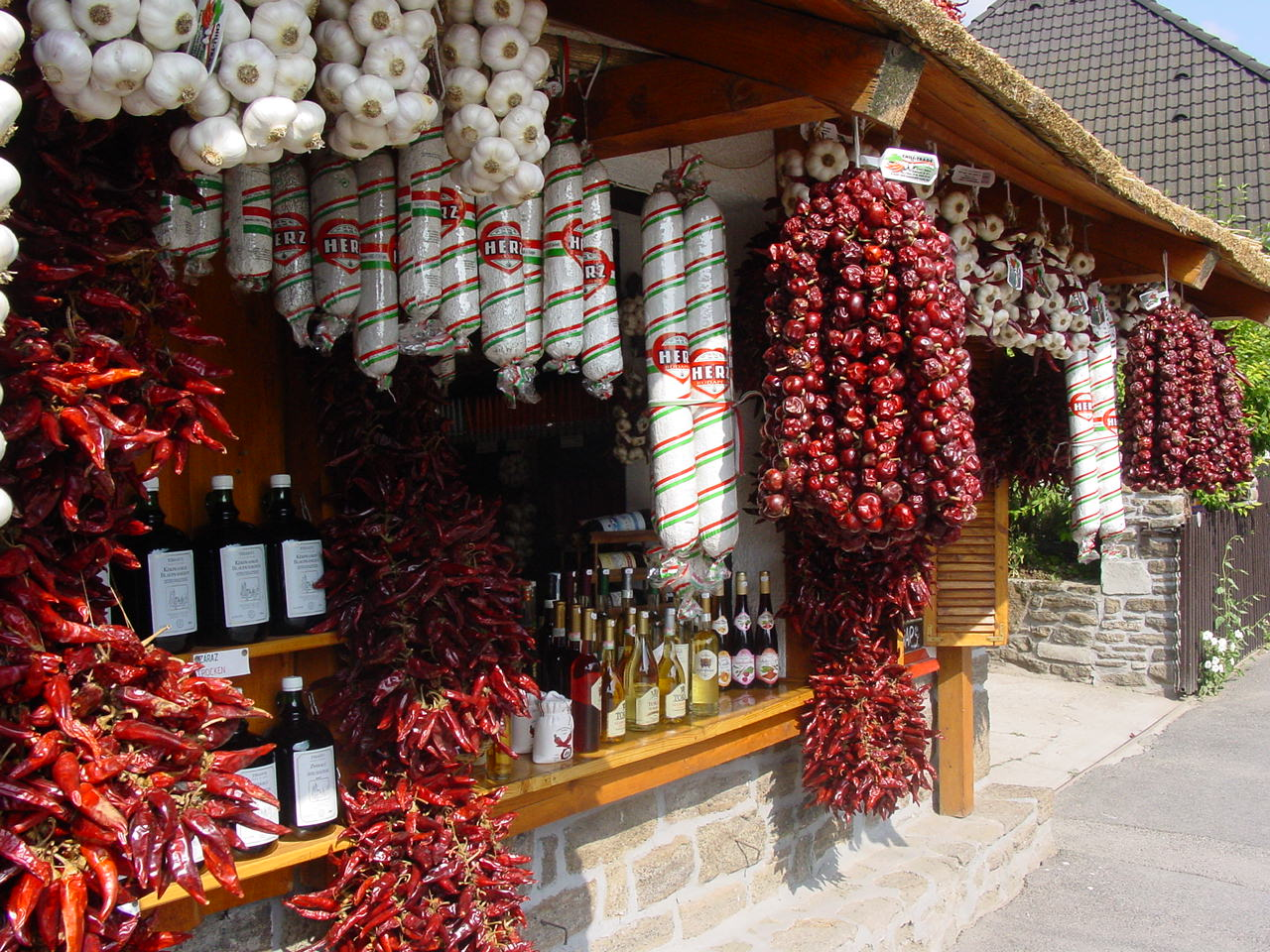
Pepper shop

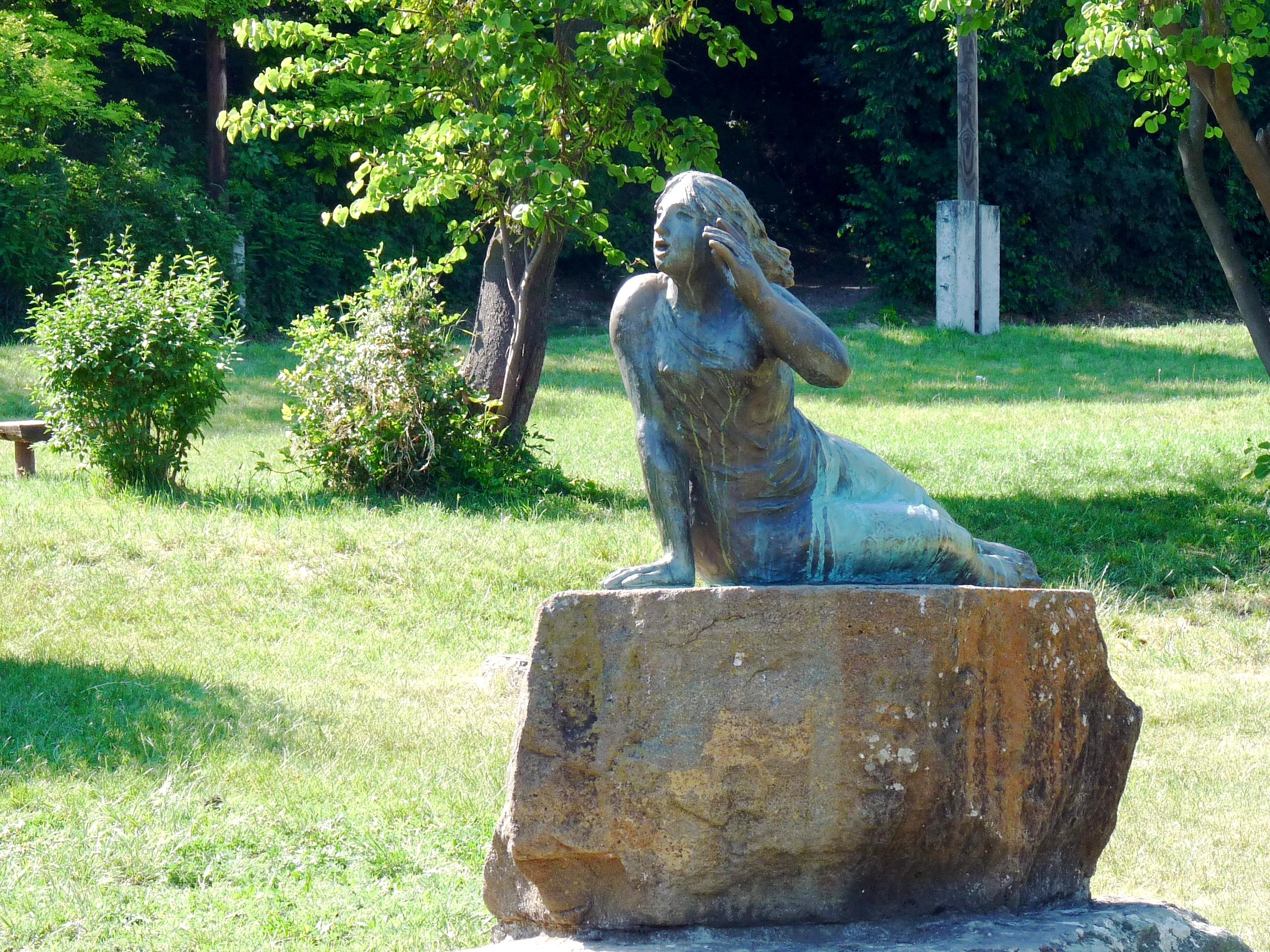
Tihany Echo

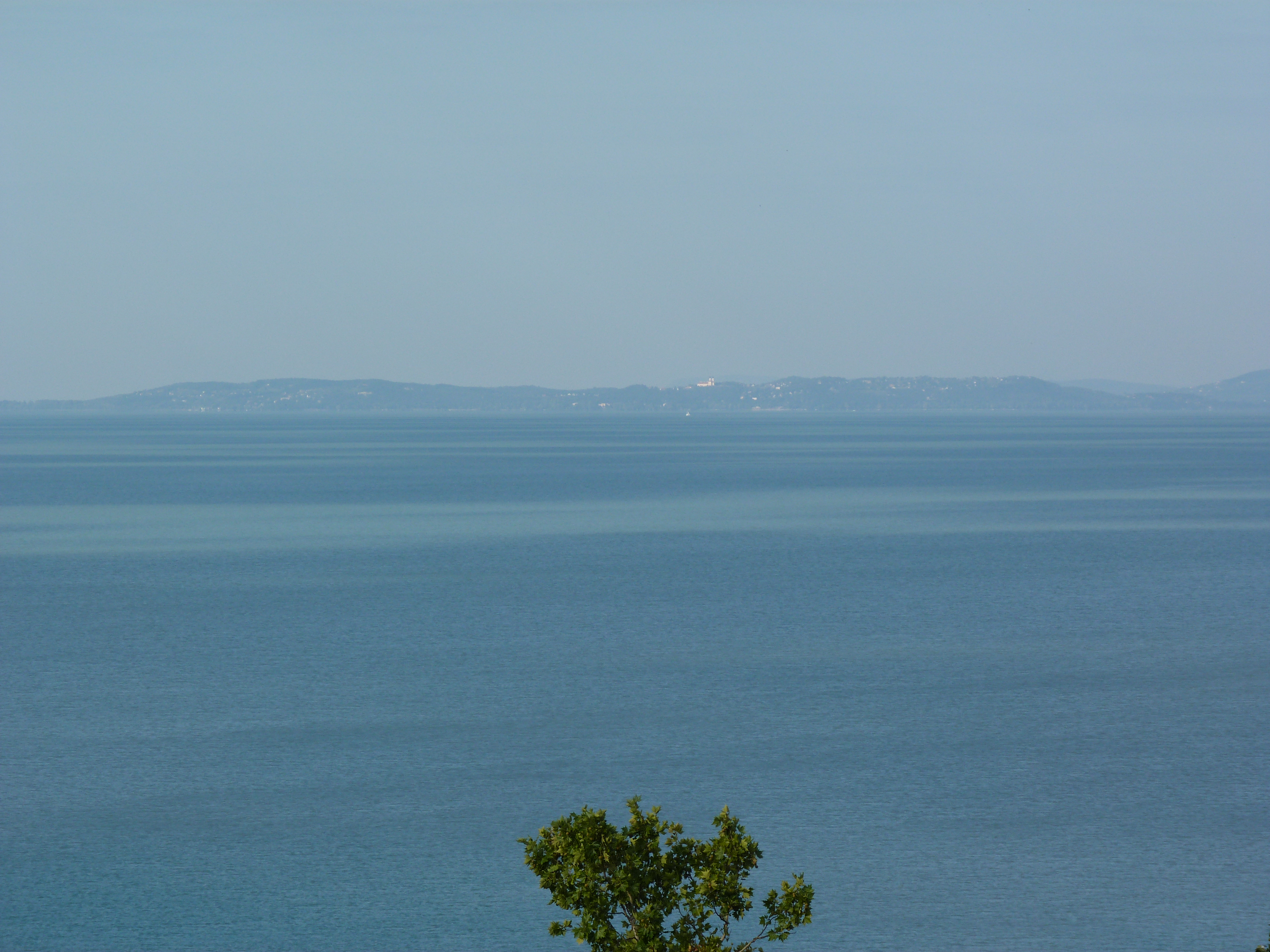
Tihany Peninsula, seen from Balatonakarattya
