= Zotmund =

11th-century Hungarian soldier

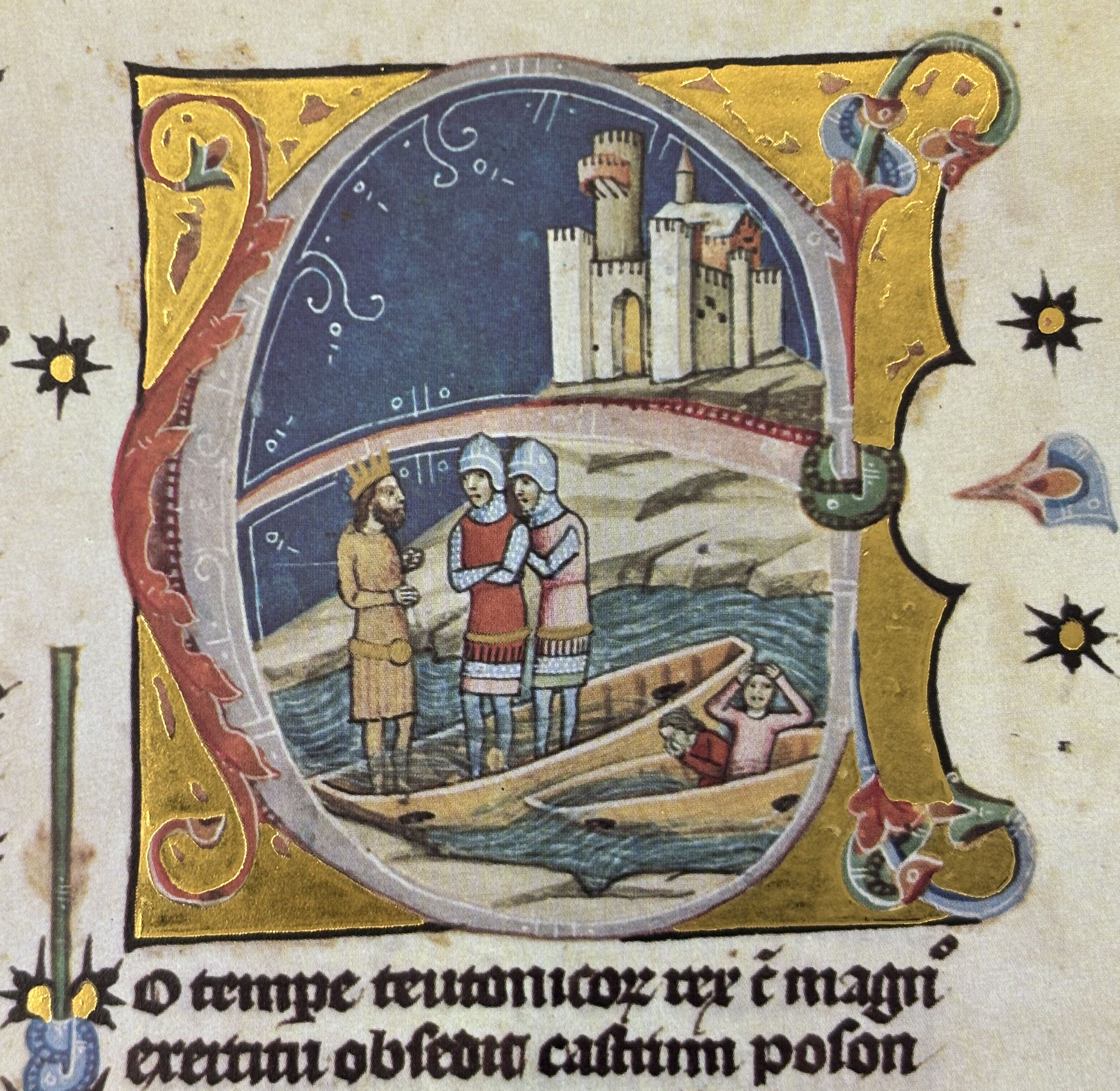
The sinking of the imperial ships at Pressburg by Zotmund, depicted in the Illuminated Chronicle

Zotmund, also known as Kund the Diver (Hungarian: Búvár Kund), was a Hungarian soldier and folk hero in the 11th century. When the Holy Roman Empire attacked the Kingdom of Hungary and laid siege to Pressburg (present-day Bratislava, Slovakia) in the summer of 1052, Zotmund dived into the Danube and scuttled the German ships, saving the castle from siege. His exploit was celebrated in later songs and works.

== Etymology ==
According to the lexicon Magyar utónévkönyv, the name Zotmund (also Zothmund or Zottmund) was of Germanic origin and explains its meaning by combining the words "fast" and "protection". Historian Gyula Pauler also thought his name was of German origin, but it did not necessarily refer to his ethnicity. Hungarian historian Csete Katona considered that the name Zotmund was of Old Norse origin, therefore it is possible that he was one of the Varangian mercenaries who served at the royal court of King Andrew I of Hungary. Later variants of the chronicle text – the 15th-century Csepregi Codex and the 16th-century Béldi Codex – spell his name as "Zothmond". Katona argued the name Zotmund is a result of a possible distortion; the original word form may also be the same as the Old Norse name Thodmund (Þjóðmundr), Sudmund (Suðmundr), or Solmund (Sólmundr). Amidst the wave of Magyarization, there were attempts to demonstrate the Hungarian origin of the name – "Szótmond" – in the second half of the 19th century.

Zotmund's ethnicity is strengthened by the fact that swimming and diving (which were not sharply separated at that time) had particularly distinguished role in the Scandinavian military culture and the sagas of Icelanders presented them as noble military virtues.

== Heroism ==
For the aforesaid king [Henry III] had come by boat to lay siege to the castle of Poson [Pressburg]; but the Hungarians who were in the castle found a man, Zotmund by name, who was a most skillful swimmer, and in the night they sent him silently to the emperor's ships, and swimming under water he made holes in all the ships, so that they immediately filled with water. Thus the power of the Germans was broken and, weakened and enervated, they returned home.

— Illuminated Chronicle

Since the early 1030s, with the emergion of the imperial Salian dynasty, the Holy Roman Empire had attempted to extend its influence over the Kingdom of Hungary. After their protege Peter was dethroned in 1046, the relationship between the two realms was constantly hostile. Under the reign of Andrew I, skirmishes on the frontier between Hungary and the Holy Roman Empire first occurred in 1050. Emperor Henry III invaded Hungary in August 1051, but Andrew and his younger brother Béla successfully applied scorched earth tactics against the imperial troops and forced them to withdraw at the Vértes Hills. Andrew initiated new peace negotiations with Henry and promised to pay an annual tribute, but his offers were refused. In the summer of 1052, the imperial army returned to Hungary and laid siege to Pressburg. According to the chronicle, this is where Zotmund's heroic deed took place, as a result of which the Germans suspended the siege and left Hungary.

Since only the 89th chapter of the Illuminated Chronicle reports on Zotmund's exploits, its details and veracity are disputed among historians. The contemporaneous Hermann of Reichenau and Annales Altahenses also mention the imperial campaign into Hungary, but they know nothing about Zotmund's action. The aforementioned chronicler Hermann writes that Henry III "laid siege to the fortress of Pressburg and for a long time attacked it with various machines of war. Since, however, God aided the besieged, who anxiously called on Him, his efforts were always frustrated and he could by no means capture it". The Annales Altahenses sees the mediation of Pope Leo IX behind the lifting of the siege. Among German works, only the 16th-century Bavarian Humanist chronicler Johannes Aventinus mentions the sinking of German ships by Zotmund, but Aventinus utilized the Hungarian chronicles to a large extent in his work. Based on these narrations, the German-language historiography – apart from the synthesis of Johann Christian von Engel from 1813 – often ignored the account in the Illuminated Chronicle, considering Zotmund's deed as a mythical element.

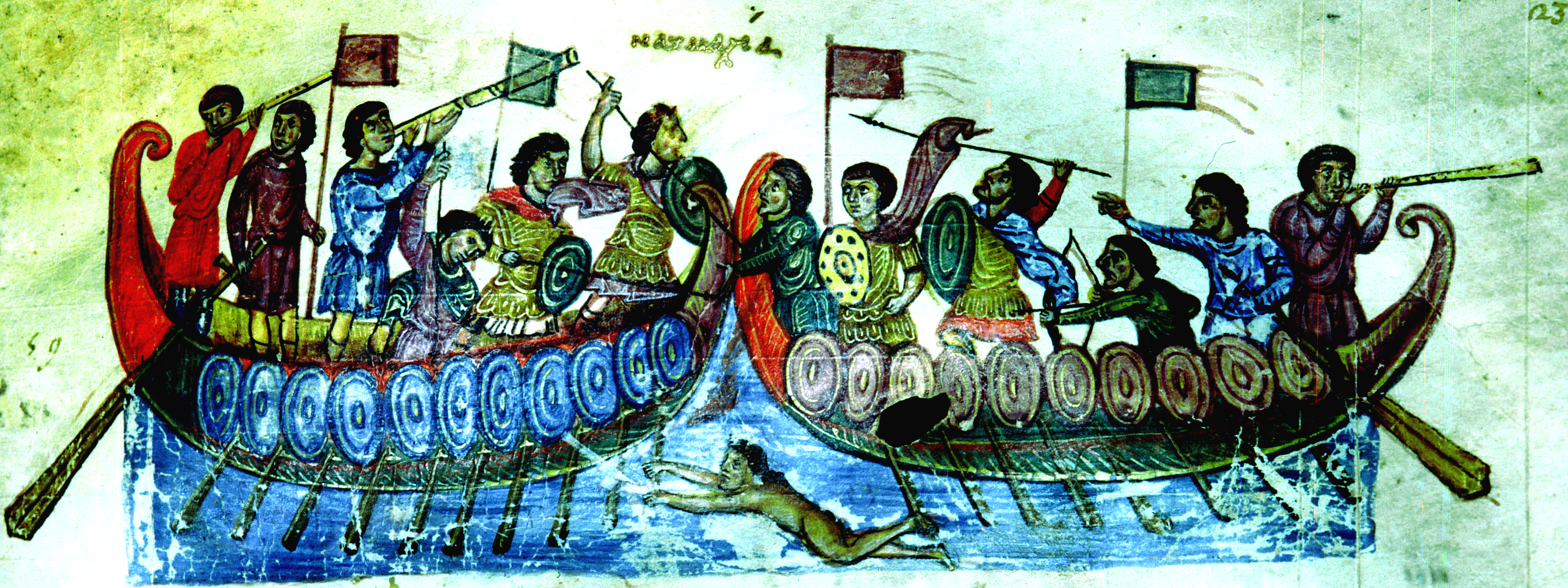
Depiction of a sea battle, in the water with a diver committing sabotage, from a 13th-century copy of Oppian's Cynegetica

Hungarian historiography is much more divided on the issue; historians György Szabados and Csaba Szabó accepted the narration of the Hungarian chronicle as authentic, which can also be confirmed by the fact that the names appearing in the chapter, with the exception of Zotmund and another warrior, possibly of Varangian origin, Vilungard, appear in the contemporary establishing charter of the abbey of Tihany (1055). On the other hand, the Hungarian chronicle contains chronological inaccuracies regarding the 1051–1052 campaign, and the chronicler reversed the chronological order of several events. László Veszprémy considered that the description of the diving feat of Zotmund most likely comes from a chronicler who wrote much later than the events (based on his style, in the early 13th century), and who may have commented on and expanded on the contemporary but brief, annalistic account of the sinking of the German ships. Csete Katona pointed out that if the story were fictional, the chronicler would not have chosen a foreign-sounding name.

Underwater archaeologist Oszkár Csepregi considered that, after Henry III and Andrew I concluded a peace through the mediation of Pope Leo IX, the end of the campaign provided the basis for sinking the ships, and they were sunk by the Germans themselves: upstream, in critical circumstances, the imperial army did not attempt to tow them, but rather left them to their fate, rendering the ships unusable so that the enemy could not acquire them (The Germans did the same thing during the unsuccessful campaign of 1074). Csepregi claimed that temporal, physiological and technical factors rule out the possibility that Zotmund alone would have drilled the ships anchored in front of the castle. Csepregi argued that Zotmund only served as a messenger, often swimming across the Danube to deliver messages between the castle and Duke Béla's military camp located nearby. In contrast, Katona argued that the act of sinking enemy ships was not an uncommon tactic during the Middle Ages, and divers had been performing military tasks since ancient times. Moreover, swimming and "diving" had a particularly distinguished role among the Scandinavians of the time. The wording of the chronicle, according to which the Hungarians defending the castle "found" (invenerunt) a person skilled in diving, also suggests that this skill was not widespread in their own circles, which may confirm the Nordic (Varangian) origin of Zotmund.

== Cultural legacy ==
=== Later chronicles ===
The story of Zotmund found its way into later historical works (for instance, Johannes de Thurocz's Chronica Hungarorum), the main source of which was the 14th-century chronicle composition (the Illuminated Chronicle and its family). The late 15th-century Humanist scholar Antonio Bonfini expanded the sequence of events in his monumental work Rerum Hungaricarum decades; accordingly, "[the emperor] besieges the city [Pressburg] from all sides for two months, but the efforts of Teutons [Germans] are completely in vain. Andrew's Hungarian guard stationed in the city came up with an unusual solution to prevent famine and to prevent the Danube from being blocked, which could have brought food and aid from the lower reaches [of the realm]. Among them is a man named Zotmund, a very skilled swimmer; on the captain's orders, he carefully swims under enemy ships on a dark night and uses a thin drill to pierce them little by little. By the time he destroys the entire fleet, he barely has time to swim back to his own, lest he be caught red-handed at sunrise. The ships loaded not only with their own weight but also with machinery begin to sink in the second or third hour of the day; most of them sink at the very beginning with their still unsuspecting crew". Although it is possible that Bonfini utilized now-lost sources, it is more probable that he used his imagination to describe the event, which was a characteristic of Humanistic historiography. A similar methodology was followed by the 16th-century Ottoman chronicle Tarih-i Üngürüs, which, however, omits the name of Zotmund and tells that the Hungarians "holed and sank many grain ships".

Gáspár Heltai, based on Bonfini's chronicle, also refers to Zotmund's deed in his Hungarian-language voluminous work Chronica az magyaroknak dolgairól (1575); although he does not name the hero, he is the first to refer to him as a "diver" (buár, in its current orthography: búvár). In the early 18th century, Jesuit historian László Turóczi also preserved the story in his Latin-language work Ungaria suis cum regibus compendio data (1729). The figure and deed of Zotmund then found the way into works summarizing the history of Hungary (e.g. György Pray, László Szalay, Mór Jókai and Mihály Horváth).

=== Modern revival ===
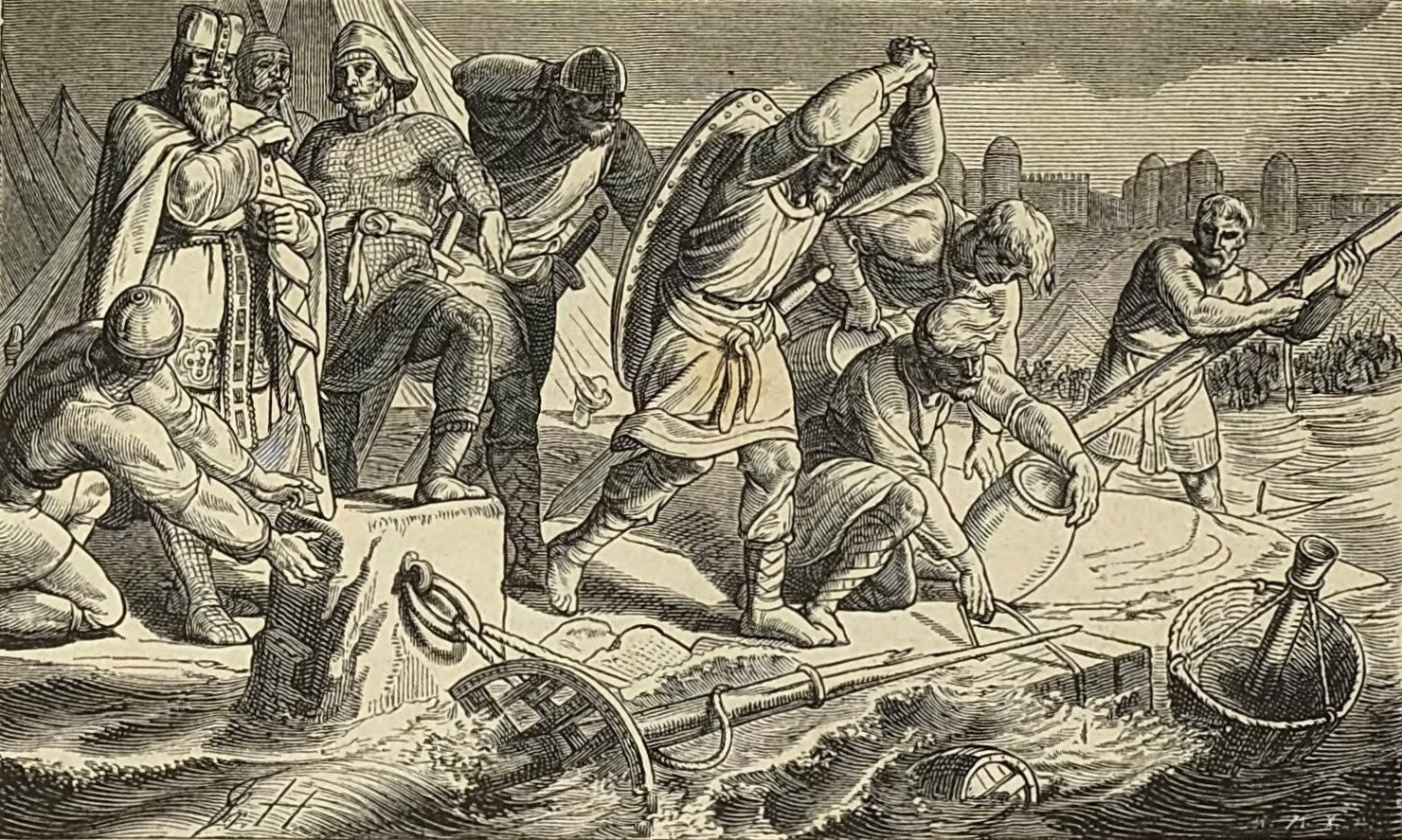
Ships of Henry III sunk before Pressburg, 1052, drawn by Friedrich Hottenroth around 1875

The 19th-century poet Mihály Vörösmarty wrote a small epic poem with the title Zotmund in 1823. Six years later, in 1829, Vörösmarty immortalized the heroic deed in another poem titled A buvár Kund (lit. "Kund the Diver") which made the story widely known and popular, and at the same time the name Kund – which was a fabrication of the poet – displaced the hero's original name in Hungarian historical consciousness. Vörösmarty was a proponent of the language reform movement and advocated the reintroduction of old Hungarian names. The name Kund or Cund derives from the title kündü, who was one of the chieftains of the dual-monarchy of the early Hungarians in the 9th century. There is no sign that the name of Kund, as the hero who sank the German ships, had become established in folk tradition before Vörösmarty's second poem.

The poems about Zotmund's heroic deed fit into the national romanticism's aspiration to immortalize and make known the glorious episodes of the Hungarian past in the form of heroic poems. Since he could not touch on the topic of the wars of independence against the Habsburgs and Austrians, Vörösmarty deliberately touched on the topic of the German–Hungarian wars of the 11th century, when Hungary successfully defended its sovereignty against imperial aspirations. The second poem eliminated the weaker structure of the first one and also reflected on the research results achieved in the meantime; his colleague Mihály Helmeczy wrote his essay A víz alatti hajózás és háború ("Underwater Navigation and Warfare") in 1828.

Hungarian writer László Geréb wrote a young adult historical fiction with the title Búvár Kund first published in 1951, which further popularized the character and the novella has gone through many reprints (1956, 1976, 1982, 1992, 2011). István Nemere wrote another historical fiction with the same title in 2006. A street in Wekerletelep, Kispest (District XIX, Budapest) bore the name Búvár Kund since 1910. A square in Erzsébettelep in Pestszentlőrinc-Pestszentimre (District XVIII, Budapest) was named after Kund the Diver too in 2001.

== Sources ==
=== Primary sources ===
- "Herman of Reichenau, Chronicle" (2008). In Robinson, I.S. Eleventh-Century Germany: The Swabian Chronicles. Manchester University Press. pp. 58–98. ISBN 978-0-7190-7734-0.
- Bak, János M. [in German]; Veszprémy, László [in Hungarian]; Kersken, Norbert (2018). Chronica de gestis Hungarorum e codice picto saec. XIV [The Illuminated Chronicle: Chronicle of the deeds of the Hungarians from the fourteenth-century illuminated codex]. Budapest: Central European University Press. ISBN 978-9-6338-6264-3.

=== Secondary sources ===
- Csepregi, Oszkár (2012). "Legenda és valóság a krónikák tükrében. Mi történt valójában 1052-ben Pozsony alatt? [Legend and Reality in the Light of the Chronicles. What Really Happened in 1052 under Pressburg?]". In Illik, Péter [in Hungarian] (ed.). A történelem peremén. Adalékok Magyarország történetéhez (in Hungarian). L'Harmattan. pp. 113–139. ISBN 978-963-236-624-1.
- Katona, Csete (2019). "A viking, aki magyar királyt ölt. Egy középkori izlandi saga magyar vonatkozásai [The Viking Who Killed a King of Hungary. Hungarian Connections with a Medieval Icelandic Saga]". Századok (in Hungarian). 153 (6). Magyar Történelmi Társulat: 1207–1232. ISSN 0039-8098.
- Ladó, János [in Esperanto]; Bíró, Ágnes (2005). Magyar utónévkönyv [Hungarian given names] (in Hungarian). Budapest: Vince Kiadó. ISBN 963 9069 72 8.
- Pauler, Gyula [in Hungarian] (1899). A magyar nemzet története az Árpád-házi királyok alatt, I. [The History of the Hungarian Nation during the Árpádian Kings, Vol. 1.] (in Hungarian). Athenaeum.
- Ráday, Mihály, ed. (2013). Budapesti utcanevek A–Z [Budapest Street Names A–Z] (in Hungarian). Budapest: Corcina. ISBN 978-963-13-6182-7.
- Veszprémy, László [in Hungarian] (2014). "Korhűség és forrásérték a magyar krónika egyes fejezeteiben [Accuracy and Source Value in Individual Chapters of the Hungarian Chronicle]". In Bárány, Attila; Dreska, Gábor; Szovák, Kornél (eds.). Arcana tabularii. Tanulmányok Solymosi László tiszteletére (in Hungarian). Magyar Tudományos Akadémia; Debreceni Egyetem; Eötvös Loránd Tudományegyetem Bölcsészettudományi Kara; Pázmány Péter Katolikus Egyetem. pp. 809–824. ISBN 978-963-4737-59-9.
- Veszprémy, László [in Hungarian] (2024). History Writing and Historians in Hungary of the Árpáds (11th–mid13th centuries). Translated by Thoroczkay-Szabó, Mária. Arpadiana XVIII., HUN–REN Research Centre for the Humanities. ISBN 978-963-416-468-5.
