= George, son of Andrew I of Hungary =

George (Hungarian: György, Latin: Georgium, born before 1050 – died after 1060), also called Yourick, was an illegitimate son of Andrew I of Hungary born in the village of Marót (Morouth), according to the Chronica Hungarorum by Johannes de Thurocz. Andrew's mistress gave birth to the child before Andrew's conversion to the Roman Catholic faith, but subsequent Christian marriage to an Orthodox princess rendered the non-Christian children of his first marriage illegitimate under Catholic Canon law, and therefore with no rights to the now Christian Hungarian throne. According to the legend, George's son Maurice (Hungarian: Móric) sailed for England between 1066 and 77, accompanying the anti-king Edgar Ætheling (who was half-Hungarian), but a storm forced them to land in Scotland, where they intermarried with the royal court and were awarded with an estate by Malcolm III, founding Clan Drummond. Yourick may come from the Slavic name Yury, indicating that he was born in the Kievan Rus' where Prince Andrew was in exile until 1046.
