= Adelaide of Hungary =

Duchess of Bohemia from 1061 to 1062

Duchess consort of Bohemia
- Tenure: 1061–1062
- Born: c. 1040
- Died: 27 January 1062
- Spouse: Vratislav II of Bohemia
- Issue: Vratislaus; Bretislaus II of Bohemia; Judith, Duchess of Poland; Ludmila of Bohemia
- House: House of Árpád
- Father: Andrew I of Hungary
- Mother: Anastasia of Kiev

Adelaide of Hungary (c. 1040 – 27 January 1062) was the only daughter of King Andrew I of Hungary. It has generally been assumed that her mother was Anastasia of Kiev, but it has been hypothesised that Adelaide could be the result of Andrew I and a different wife owing to a theory that Yaroslav the Wise wouldn't marry his daughter to an exiled dynast who did not appear to have a strong claim to the throne. Andrew would not gain serious support until 1045, five years after Adelaide is thought to have been born.

== Biography ==
She was the second wife of Vratislav II of Bohemia, whom she married in 1058. She was a good dynastic match for Vratislav, as he profited from the alliance with her father. They had four children, including Bretislaus II of Bohemia and Judith of Bohemia. Vratislav became duke in 1061 after the death of his brother; thus, Adelaide was duchess for only a short time before her death early in 1062.

Her husband remarried shortly after her death to Świętosława of Poland and was later crowned as the first King of Bohemia in 1085.

== Notes ==
Adelaide of Hungary Árpád dynasty Born: c. 1040 Died: 27 January 1062
Royal titles
Preceded by Ida of Wettin	Duchess consort of Bohemia; 1061–1062	Succeeded by Świętosława of Poland
