= Andrew I of Hungary =

King of Hungary from 1046 to 1060

Andrew I
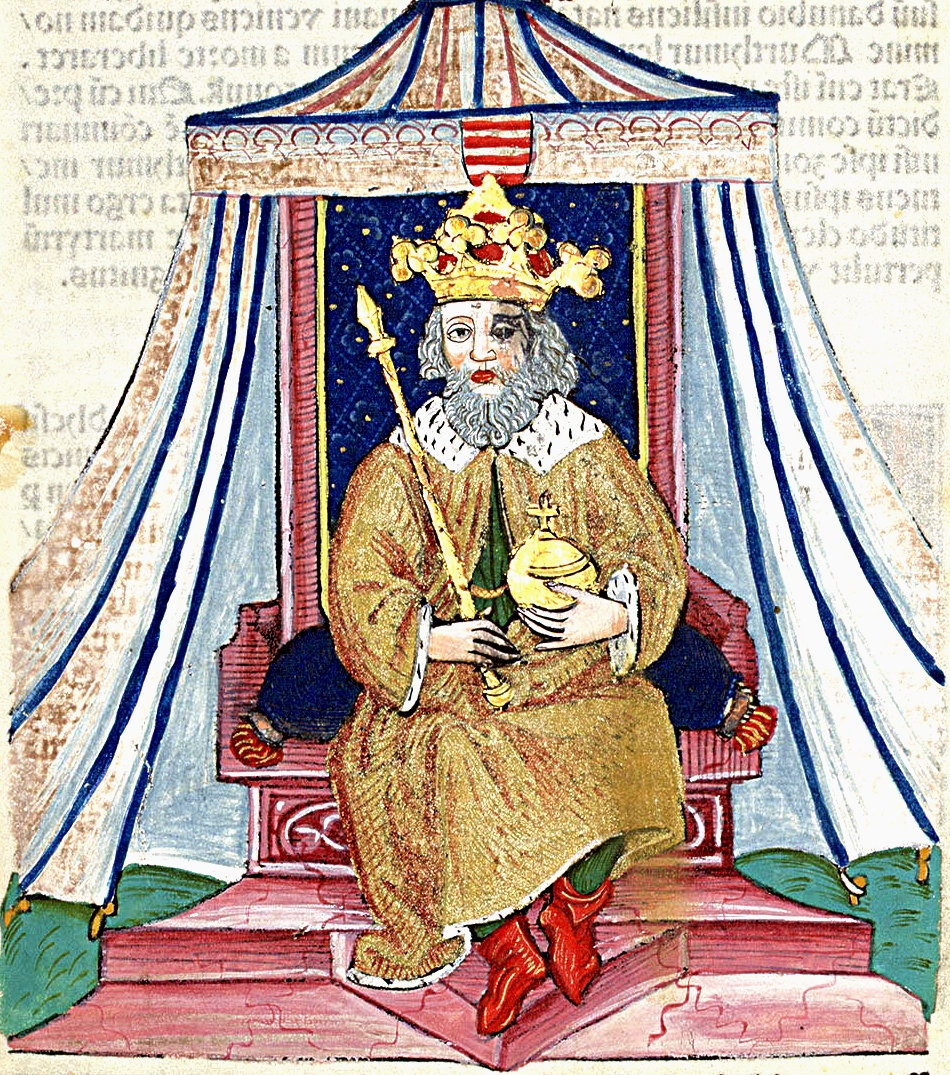
- Andrew I on the throne (Thuróczi's Chronicle)

King of Hungary
- Reign: September 1046 – December 1060
- Coronation: September 1046, Székesfehérvár
- Predecessor: Peter
- Successor: Béla I
- Born: c. 1015
- Died: before 6 December 1060 (aged 44–45); Zirc, Kingdom of Hungary
- Burial: Tihany Abbey
- Spouse: Anastasia of Kiev
- Issue: Adelaide, Duchess of Bohemia; Solomon, King of Hungary; David; George (illegitimate)
- Dynasty: Árpád dynasty
- Father: Vazul
- Mother: a lady from the Clan Tátony
- Religion: Roman Catholic

Andrew I the White or the Catholic (Hungarian: I. Fehér or Katolikus András/Endre; c. 1015 – before 6 December 1060) was King of Hungary from 1046 to 1060. He descended from a younger branch of the Árpád dynasty. After he spent fifteen years in exile, an extensive revolt by the pagan Hungarians enabled him to take the throne from King Peter Orseolo. He strengthened the position of Catholicism in the Kingdom of Hungary and successfully defended its independence against the Holy Roman Empire.

His efforts to ensure the succession of his son, Solomon, resulted in the open revolt of his brother Béla. Béla dethroned Andrew by force in 1060. Andrew suffered severe injuries during the fighting and died before his brother was crowned king.

== Early life ==
=== Childhood (c. 1015–1031) ===
Medieval sources provide two contradictory reports of the parents of Andrew and his two brothers, Levente and Béla. The Chronicle of Zagreb and Saint Gerard's Life write that their father was Vazul, a grandson of Taksony, Grand Prince of the Hungarians (r. c. 955 – c. 970). The Illuminated Chronicle and other medieval sources write of Vazul's relationship with "some girl" from the Tátony clan who bore his sons, who thus "were not born of a true marriage-bed". According to a concurrent tradition, which has been preserved by most chronicles, the three princes were the sons of Vazul's brother, Ladislas the Bald. Modern historians, who reject the latter report, agree that Andrew and his brothers were the sons of Vazul and his concubine from the Tátony clan. According to the historian Gyula Kristó, Andrew was the second among Vazul's three sons. He writes that Andrew was born around 1015.

=== In exile (1031–1046) ===
According to medieval chronicles, Vazul was blinded during the reign of his cousin, King Stephen I, the first Christian monarch of Hungary (r. 997–1038). The king ordered Vazul's mutilation in 1031, after the death of Emeric, his only son who survived infancy. The contemporary Annals of Altaich contends that the king himself ordered his kinsman's mutilation in an attempt to ensure a peaceful succession to his own sister's son, Peter Orseolo. The same source adds that the king expelled his blinded cousin's three sons from Hungary. According to the contrasting report of the Hungarian chronicles, King Stephen wanted to save the young princes' lives from their enemies in the royal court and "counselled them with all speed" to depart from Hungary.

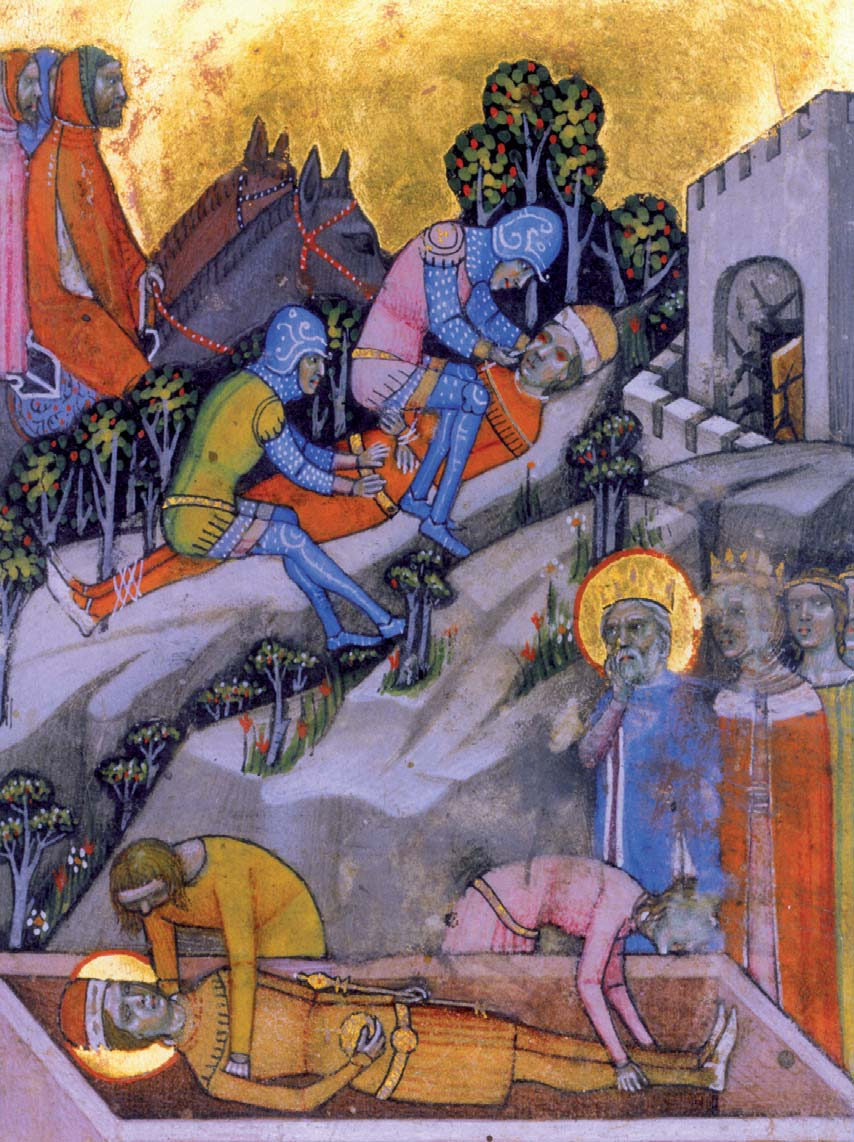
The blinding of Vazul after the death of Emeric, the only son of King Stephen I of Hungary (Chronicon Pictum, 1358)

Having his own son died in his father's life, and having no other sons, Stephen, the king of good memory, who was the maternal uncle of [Peter Orseolo], adopted and appointed him as heir to his kingdom. For his kinsman's son disagreed with him on this, [Stephen] had him blinded, even if he was worthier of the kingdom, and sent his little sons into exile.

— Annals of Altaich

Exiled from Hungary, Andrew and his brothers settled in the court of Duke Oldřich of Bohemia (r. 1012–1033). Here they came across King Mieszko II of Poland (r. 1025–1031, 1032–1034), who likewise had found refuge in Bohemia after his enemies had expelled him from his kingdom. The Polish monarch regained his crown and returned to Poland in 1032. Andrew, Béla and Levente, whose "condition of life was poor and mean" in Bohemia, followed Mieszko II, who received them "kindly and honourably" in Poland. After the youngest of them, Béla, married Richeza, a daughter of Mieszko II, Andrew and Levente decided to depart from Poland because they "felt that they would be living in Poland under their brother's shadow", according to Simon of Kéza.

Hungarian chronicles have preserved a story full of fabulous or anachronistic details of the two brothers' ensuing wanderings. For instance, they narrate that Andrew and Levente were captured by Cumans, but the latter only arrived in Europe in the 1050s.

Having received permission from [the Polish monarch, Andrew and Levente] left their brother [Béla] behind and made their way to the King of Lodomeria, who did not receive them. Since they had nowhere to lay their head, they went from there to the [Cumans]. Seeing that they were persons of excellent bearing, the [Cumans] thought that they had come to spy out the land, and unless a captive Hungarian had recognized them, they should certainly have killed them; but they kept them with them for some time. Then they departed thence to Russia.

— The Hungarian Illuminated Chronicle

After enduring many hardships, Andrew and Levente established themselves in the court of Yaroslav the Wise, Grand Prince of Kiev (r. 1019–1054) in the late 1030s. The grand prince gave his daughter Anastasia in marriage to Andrew. Kristó writes that Andrew, who had up to that time remained pagan, was baptized on this occasion.

=== Return to Hungary (1046) ===
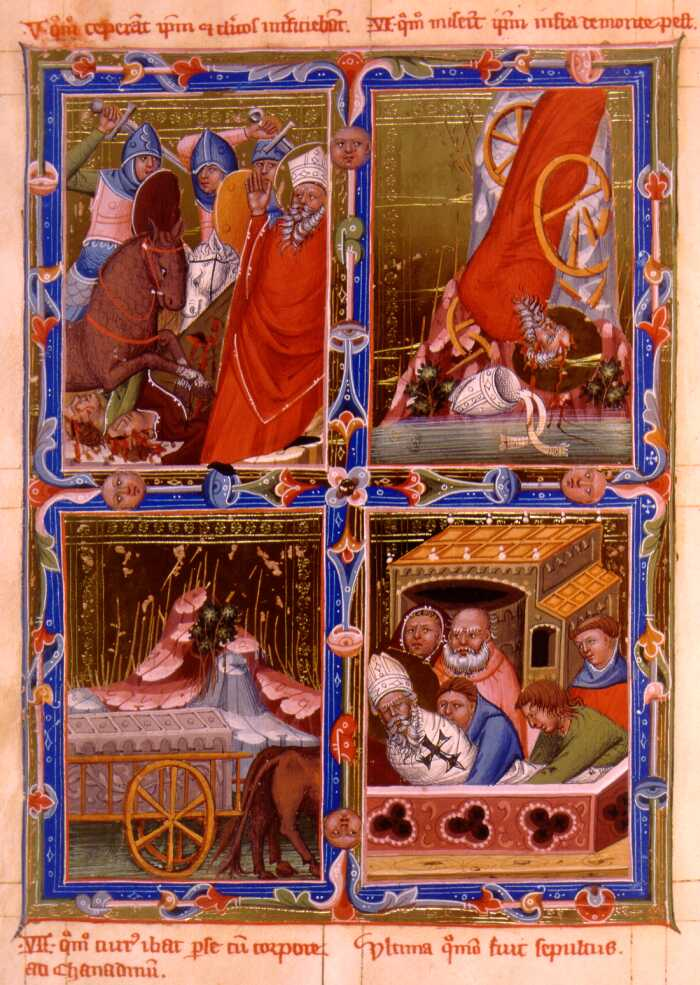
Pagans slaughtering priests and the martyrdom of Bishop Gerard of Csanád depicted in the Anjou Legendarium

In the meantime, King Peter Orseolo, who had succeeded King Stephen in Hungary in 1038, alienated many lords and prelates, especially when he solemnly recognized the suzerainty of the Holy Roman Emperor, Henry III, in 1045. According to the Illuminated Chronicle, the discontented lords, "seeing the sufferings of their people", assembled in Csanád (Cenad, Romania). They agreed to send envoys to Andrew and Levente in Kiev in order to persuade them to return to Hungary. Fearing "some treacherous ambush", the two brothers only set out after the agents they had sent to Hungary confirmed that the Hungarians were ripe for an uprising against the king.

By the time the two brothers decided to return, a revolt had broken out in Hungary. It was dominated by pagans who captured many clergymen and mercilessly slaughtered them. They met the rebels at Abaújvár. The Illuminated Chronicle narrates how the pagans urged the dukes "to allow the whole people to live according to the rites of the pagans, to kill the bishops and the clergy, to destroy the churches, to throw off the Christian faith and to worship idols". The same source adds that Andrew and Levente gave in to all their demands, "for otherwise they would not fight" for them against King Peter.

The Annals of Altaich states that Andrew "savagely raged against the flock of the Holy Church". Even so, Bishop Gerard of Csanád and four other prelates were ready to join Andrew, but the pagans captured and slaughtered three of them (including Gerard) at Buda. King Peter decided to flee from Hungary and take refuge in Austria. However, Andrew's envoys tricked the king into returning before he reached the frontier, and they captured and blinded him.

== Reign ==
=== Coronation (1046–1047) ===
Most Hungarian lords and the prelates opposed the restoration of paganism. They preferred the devout Christian Andrew to his pagan brother Levente, even if, at least according to Kristó and Steinhübel, the latter was the eldest among Vazul's three sons. The Hungarian chronicles write that Levente, who died in short time, did not oppose his brother's ascension to the throne. The three bishops who had survived the pagan uprising crowned Andrew in Székesfehérvár in the last quarter of 1046 or in the spring of 1047. Historian Ferenc Makk writes that Andrew was crowned with a crown that the Byzantine Emperor Constantine IX Monomachos had sent to him. Nine enamelled plaques from this golden crown were unearthed in Nyitraivánka (Ivanka pri Nitre, Slovakia) in the 19th century. Andrew soon broke with his pagan supporters, restored Christianity and declared pagan rites illegal. According to Kosztolnyik, Andrew's epithets (the White or the Catholic) are connected to these events.

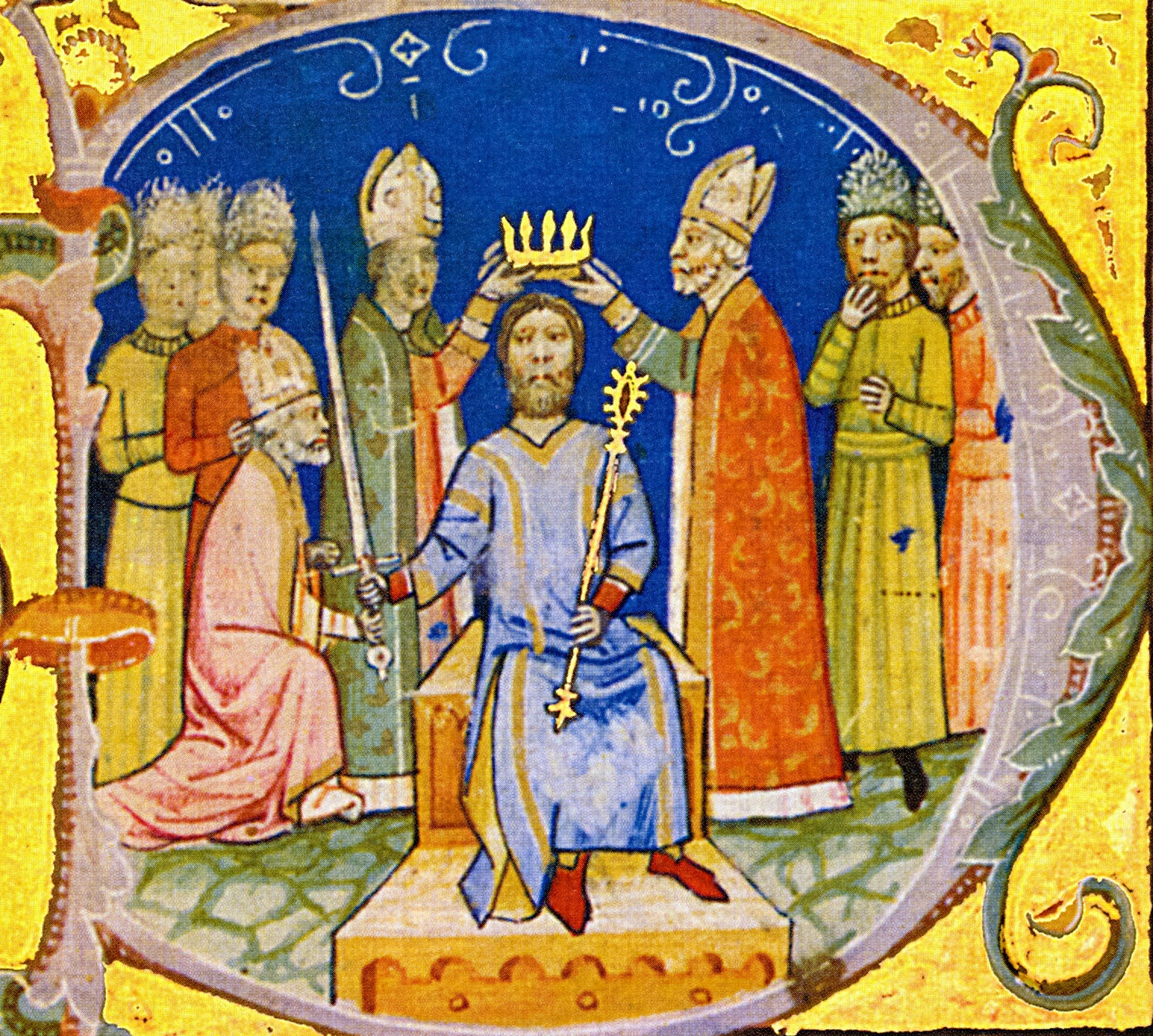
Coronation of Andrew I (Illuminated Chronicle)

Having now been made secure against all disturbances from enemies, Duke Andreas received the crown of kingship in the royal city of Alba. No more than three bishops who had escaped that great slaughter of the Christians performed the ceremony of coronation in the year of our Lord 1047. He made proclamation to all his people that under pain of death they should lay aside the pagan rites which had formerly been permitted to them, and that they should return to the true faith of Christ and live in all things according to the law which King St Stephen had taught them.

— The Hungarian Illuminated Chronicle

=== Wars with the Holy Roman Empire (1047–1053) ===
The contemporaneous Hermann of Reichenau narrates that Andrew "sent frequent envoys with humble entreaties" to Emperor Henry III, proposing "an annual tribute and faithful service" if the emperor recognized his reign. Andrew persuaded his brother, Béla, to return from Poland to Hungary in 1048. He also granted his brother one third of the kingdom with the title of duke. Béla's duchy comprised two regions which were centered on Nyitra (Nitra, Slovakia) and Bihar (Biharia, Romania).

Skirmishes on the frontier between Hungary and the Holy Roman Empire first occurred in 1050. Emperor Henry invaded Hungary in August 1051, but Andrew and Béla successfully applied scorched earth tactics against the imperial troops and forced them to withdraw. Legend says that the Vértes Hills near Székesfehérvár were named after the armours—vért in Hungarian—which were discarded by the retreating German soldiers.

Andrew initiated new peace negotiations with the emperor and promised to pay an annual tribute, but his offers were refused. Next summer, the emperor returned to Hungary and laid siege to Pressburg (Bratislava, Slovakia). Zotmund, "a most skilful swimmer" scuttled the emperor's ships. After Pope Leo IX mediated a peace treaty, the emperor lifted the siege and withdrew from Hungary. Andrew soon refused to fulfill his promises made under duress, and even allied with Conrad I, Duke of Bavaria, a prominent opponent of Emperor Henry III.

Because Andreas, the king of the Hungarians was less and less inclined to send envoys and to make promises concerning a peace treaty, [the emperor] laid siege to the fortress of Pressburg and for a long time attacked it with various machines of war. Since, however, God aided the besieged, who anxiously called on Him, his efforts were always frustrated and he could by no means capture it. Meanwhile the lord Pope Leo had intervened at the request of Andreas to make peace and he called on the emperor to end the siege. Since [the pope] found [the emperor] in all respects in agreement with him, while discovering that Andreas on the contrary was less obedient to his advice, he was angry and threatened the latter with excommunication for mocking the apostolic see.

— Herman of Reichenau: Chronicle

=== Succession crisis and death (1053–1060) ===
Andrew's queen, Anastasia, gave birth to a son, named Solomon in 1053. Andrew attempted to make his son's succession secure, even against his brother, Béla, who had a strong claim to succeed Andrew according to the traditional principle of agnatic seniority.

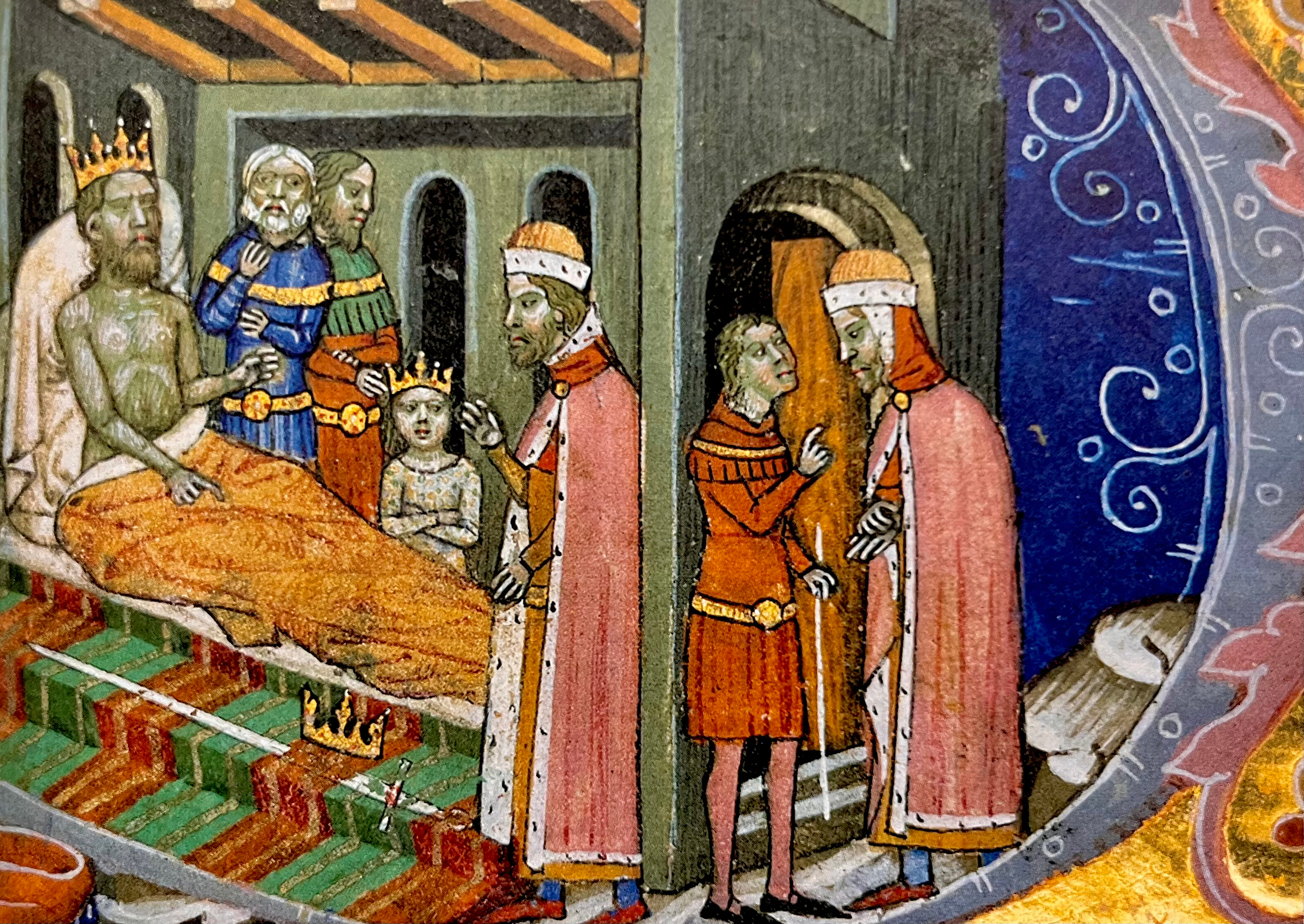
The scene at Tiszavárkony depicted in the Illuminated Chronicle: the paralyzed Andrew forces his brother, Béla to choose between the crown and the sword

The brothers' relationship did not deteriorate immediately after Solomon's birth. In the deed of the foundation of the Tihany Abbey, a Benedictine monastery established in 1055 by Andrew, Duke Béla was listed among the lords witnessing the act. This charter, although primarily written in Latin, contains the earliest extant text—Feheruuaru rea meneh hodu utu rea ("on the military road which leads to Fehérvár")—written in Hungarian. Andrew also established a lavra for Orthodox hermits in Tihany and an Orthodox monastery near Visegrád. The Third Book of Law of King Ladislaus I of Hungary (r. 1077–1095) refers to an "estate survey of the judge Sarkas" under "King Andrew and Duke Béla". According to György Györffy, the serfs of the royal domains were registered during this survey which took place around 1056.

Andrew suffered a stroke which paralyzed him. In an attempt to strengthen his son's claim to the throne, he had the four-year-old Solomon crowned in the one-year-long period beginning in the autumn of 1057. For the same purpose, Andrew also arranged the engagement of his son with Judith—a daughter of the late Emperor Henry III, and sister of the new German monarch, Henry IV (r. 1056–1105)—in September 1058. Thereafter, according to an episode narrated by most Hungarian chronicles, the king invited Duke Béla to a meeting at Tiszavárkony. At their meeting, Andrew seemingly offered his brother to freely choose between a crown and a sword, which were the symbols of the kingdom and the ducatus, respectively. Duke Béla, who had previously been informed by his partisans in Andrew's court that he would be murdered on the king's order if he opted for the crown, chose the sword.

However, Béla, who actually had no intention of renouncing his claim to succeed his brother in favor of his nephew, fled to Poland and sought military assistance from Duke Boleslaus II of Poland (r. 1058–1079). With Duke Boleslaus's support, Béla returned to Hungary at the head of Polish troops. On the other hand, the Dowager Empress Agnes—who governed the Holy Roman Empire in the name of her minor son, Henry IV—sent Bavarian, Bohemian and Saxon troops to assist Andrew.

The decisive battle was fought in the regions east of the river Tisza. Andrew suffered injuries and lost the battle. He attempted to flee to the Holy Roman Empire, but his brother's partisans routed his retinue at Moson. The Annals of Niederaltaich narrates that wagons and horses trampled him in the battlefield. Mortally wounded, Andrew was captured and taken by his brother's partisans to Zirc where "he was treated with neglect", according to the Illuminated Chronicle. Andrew died in the royal manor there before his brother was crowned king on 6 December 1060. Andrew was buried in the crypt of the church of the Tihany Abbey.

== Family ==
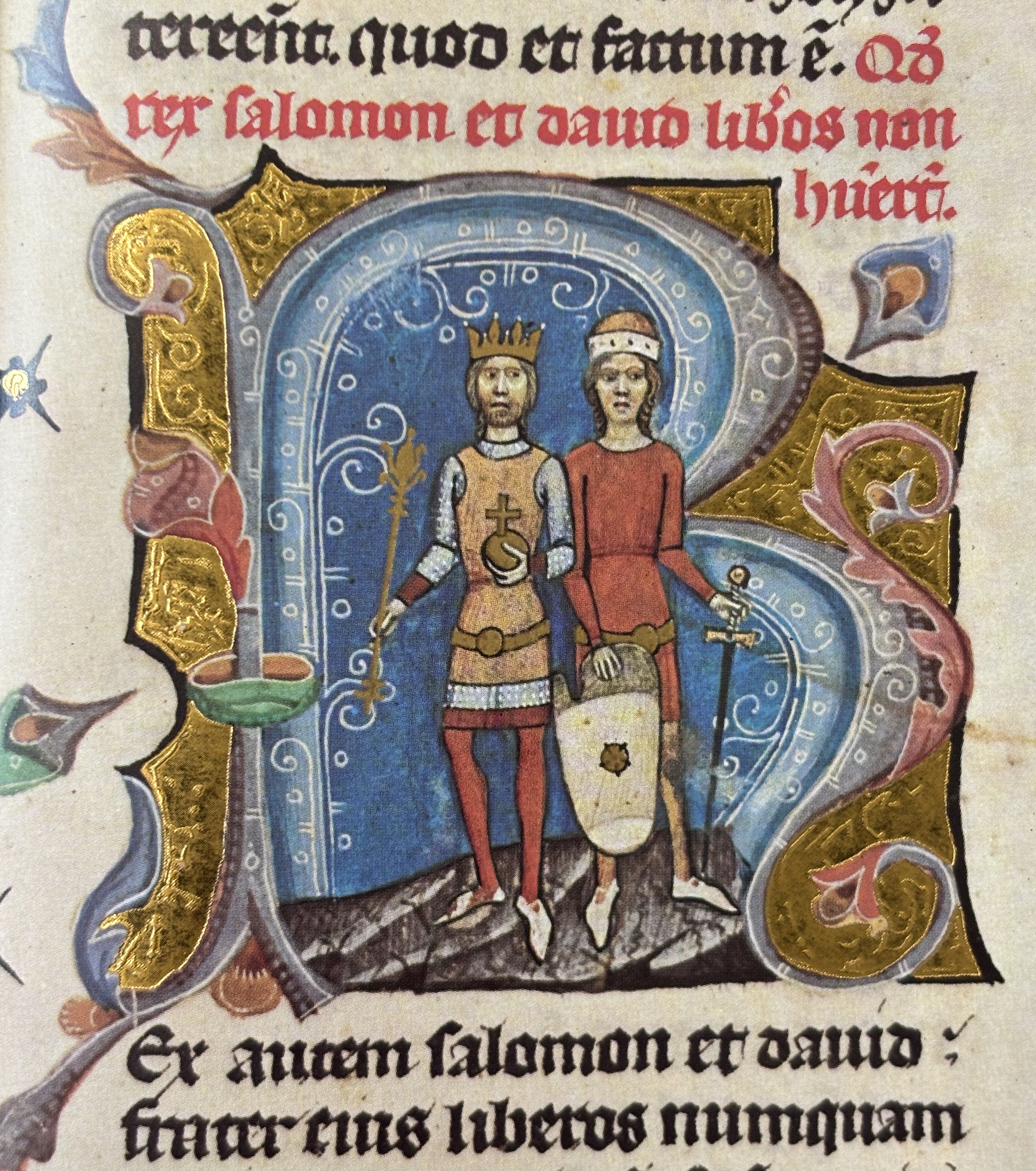
The two sons of Andrew by his wife, Anastasia of Kiev, King Solomon of Hungary (r. 1063–1074) and Duke David

Andrew's wife, Anastasia, was the daughter of Grand Duke Yaroslav I the Wise of Kiev by his wife, Ingegerd, who herself was the daughter of King Olof Skötkonung of Sweden. Andrew married Anastasia, who was born in about 1020, around 1038. Their first child, Adelaide, was born around 1040. She became the wife of Vratislaus II of Bohemia, who was initially Duke and, from 1085, King of Bohemia. Andrew and Anastasia's first son, Solomon, was born in 1053, their second son, David, some years later. Neither Solomon nor David fathered sons; the male line of Andrew's family died out with their deaths by the end of the 11th century.

King Salomon and David, his brother, never had children, and the seed of King Andreas perished with them. We believe that this was by an act of God; for on his first return with Levente, his brother, to Hungary, Andreas with the purpose of gaining the kingdom permitted the ungodly Vatha and other most evil men to kill the saintly Gerard and many Christians.

— The Hungarian Illuminated Chronicle

Medieval chronicles write that Andrew had a natural son, named George, "by a concubine" from the village of Pilismarót. Since his name was popular among Orthodox believers, Gyula Kristó says that his mother may have been a Rus' lady-in-waiting of Andrew's queen. The story that the Clan Drummond in Scotland are descended from George and his son Maurice is not accepted by some scholars.

The following family tree presents Andrew's ancestry, his offspring, and some of his relatives mentioned in the article.

Taksony	a "Cuman" lady*
Géza	Michael	a Bulgarian princess**
Stephen I of Hungary	a lady of the Tátony clan	Vazul	Ladislas the Bald
concubine from Pilismarót	Andrew I of Hungary	Anastasia of Kiev	Levente	Béla I of Hungary
Kings of Hungary (from 1074)
George	Adelaide	Vratislaus II of Bohemia	Solomon of Hungary	Judith of Swabia	David

*A Khazar, Pecheneg or Volga Bulgarian lady.
**Györffy writes that she may have been a member of the Bulgarian Cometopuli dynasty.

== Gallery ==
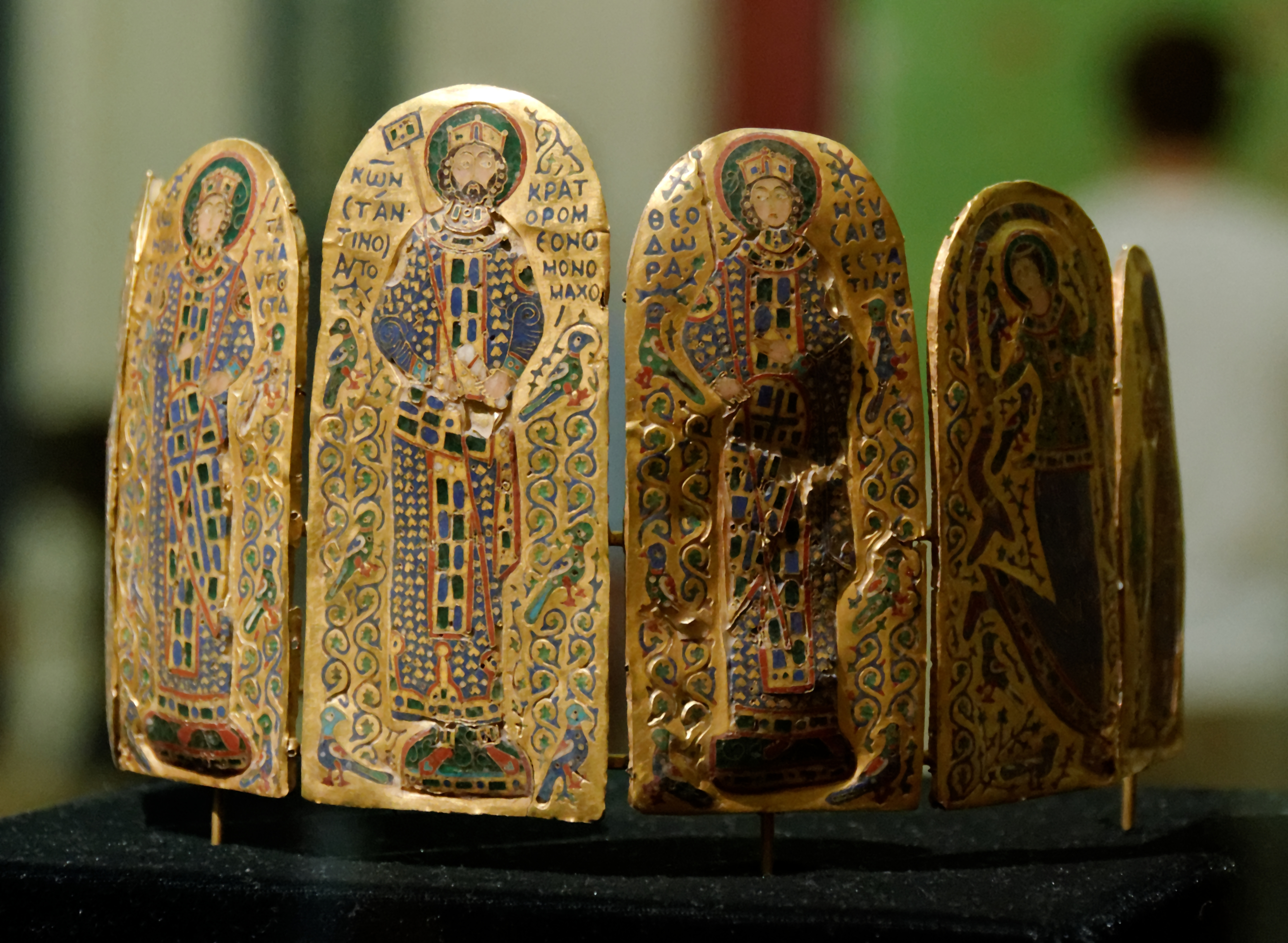
The plaques of gold from the crown found at Nyitraivánka (Ivanka pri Nitre, Slovakia) – Andrew I was crowned with this crown, according to historian Ferenc Makk.

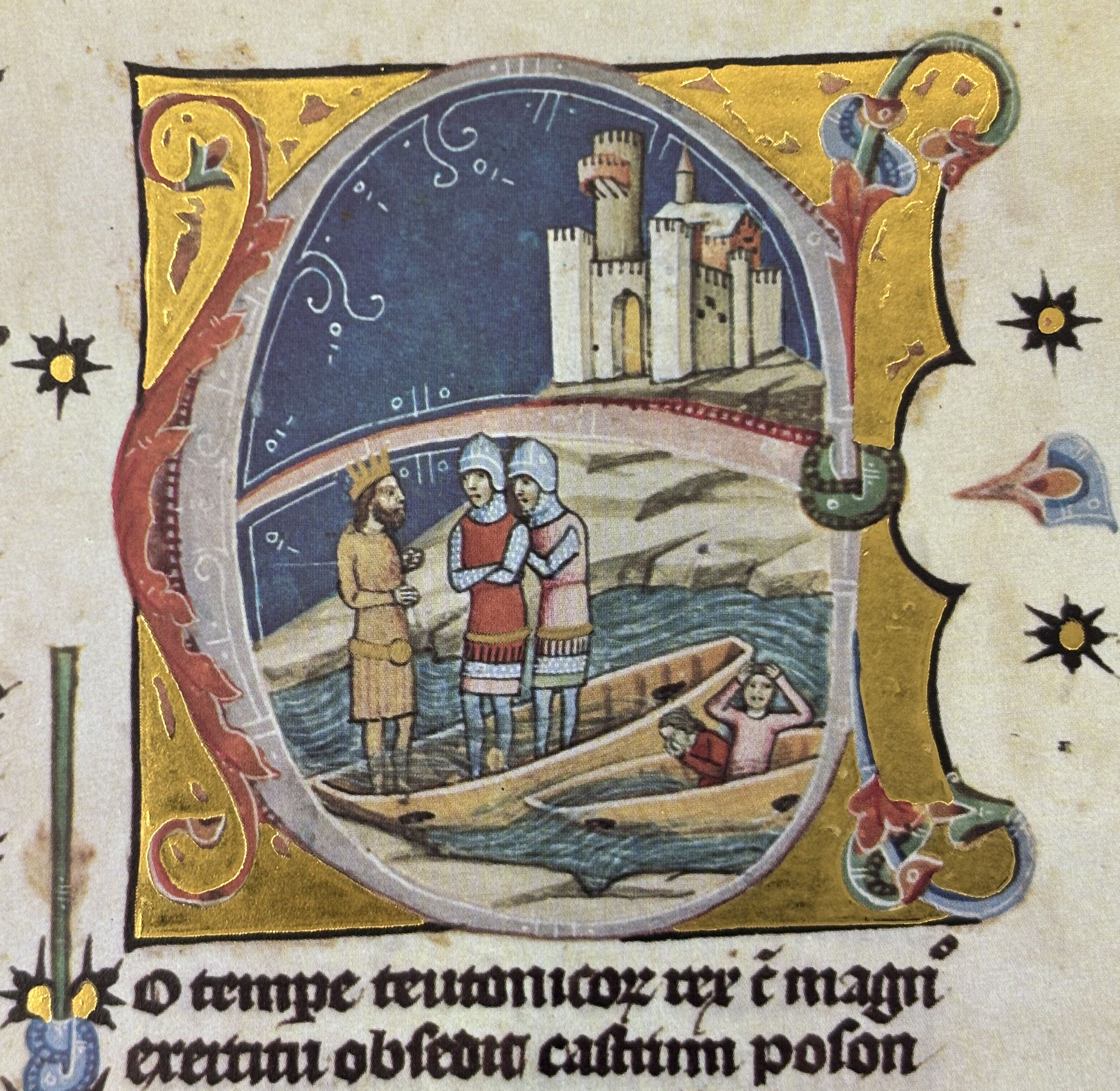
The sinking of the imperial ships at Pressburg by Knight Zotmund, depicted in the Illuminated Chronicle

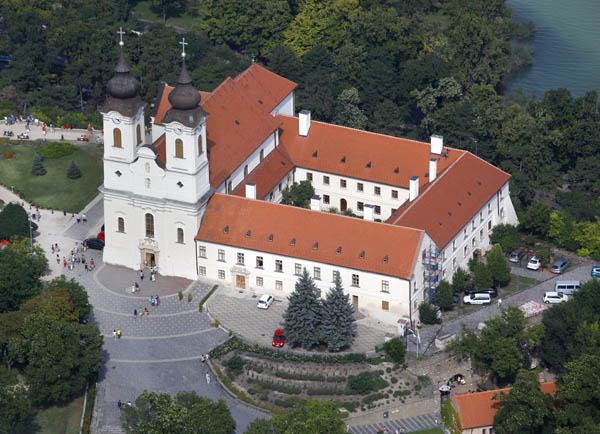
The Benedictine Tihany Abbey founded in 1055 by Andrew

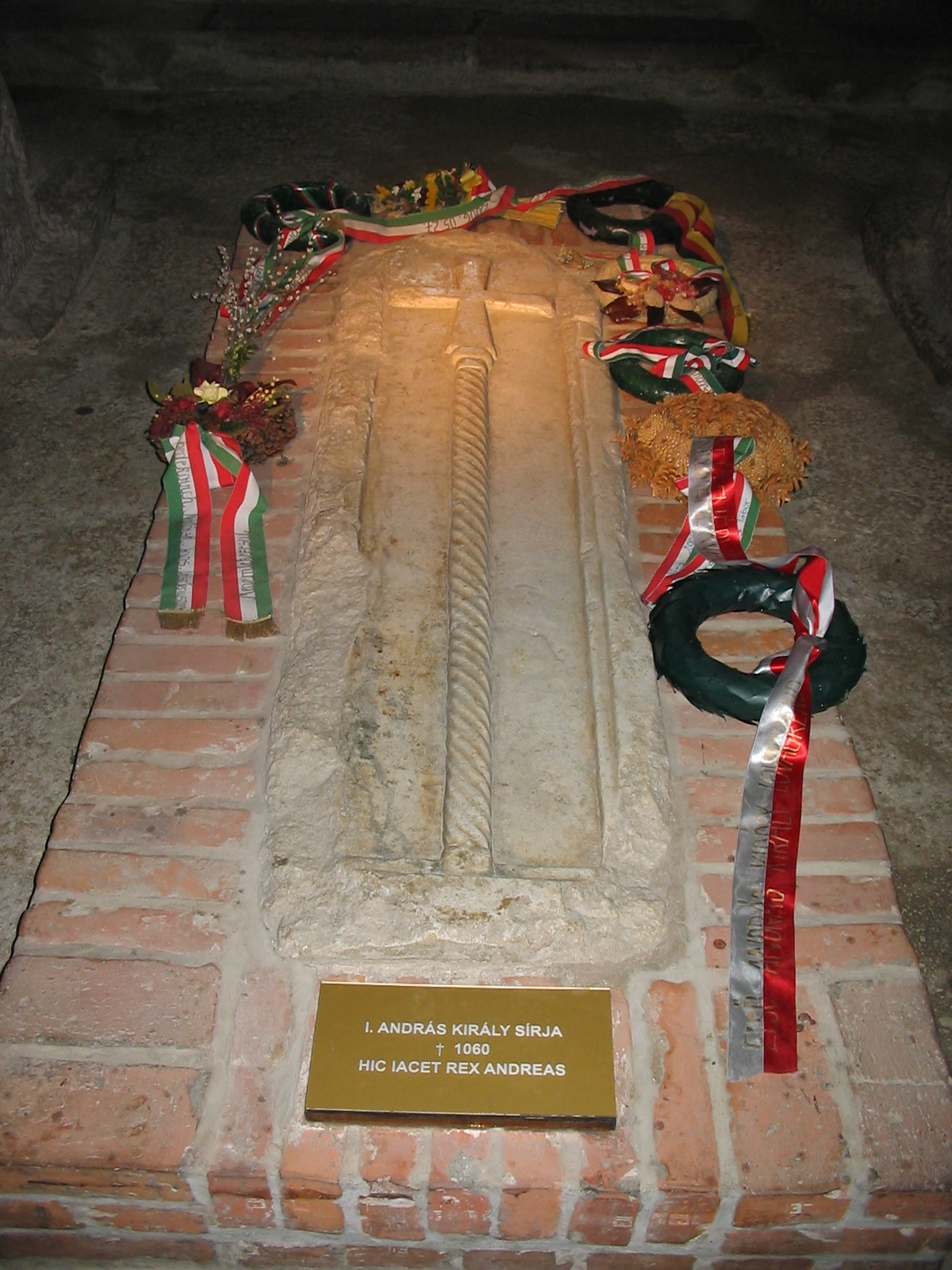
Andrew's tomb in the crypt of the church of the Tihany Abbey

== Sources ==
=== Primary sources ===
- "Herman of Reichenau, Chronicle" (2008). In Robinson, I.S. Eleventh-Century Germany: The Swabian Chronicles. Manchester University Press. pp. 58–98. ISBN 978-0-7190-7734-0.
- Simon of Kéza: The Deeds of the Hungarians (Edited and translated by László Veszprémy and Frank Schaer with a study by Jenő Szűcs) (1999). CEU Press. ISBN 963-9116-31-9.
- The Hungarian Illuminated Chronicle: Chronica de Gestis Hungarorum (Edited by Dezső Dercsényi) (1970). Corvina, Taplinger Publishing. ISBN 0-8008-4015-1.
- "The Laws of King Ladislas I (1077–1095): Book Three". In The Laws of the Medieval Kingdom of Hungary, 1000–1301 (Translated and Edited by János M. Bak, György Bónis, James Ross Sweeney with an essay on previous editions by Andor Czizmadia, 2nd rev. ed., In collaboration with Leslie S. Domonkos) (1999). Charles Schlacks Jr. Publishers. pp. 15–22. ISBN 1-884445-29-2. OCLC 495379882. OCLC 248424393. LCCN 89-10492. OL 12153527M. (ISBN may be misprinted in the book as 88445–29–2).
- Curtin, D.P. (2023). Ecclesiastical Constitutions of Andrew I of Hungary. Dalcassian. ISBN 979-8-3302-5362-3.

=== Secondary sources ===
- Bartl, Július; Čičaj, Viliam; Kohútova, Mária; Letz, Róbert; Segeš, Vladimír; Škvarna, Dušan (2002). Slovak History: Chronology & Lexicon. Bolchazy-Carducci Publishers, Slovenské Pedegogické Nakladatel'stvo. ISBN 0-86516-444-4.
- Berend, Nora; Laszlovszky, József; Szakács, Béla Zsolt (2007). "The Kingdom of Hungary". In Berend, Nora (ed.). Christianization and the Rise of Christian Monarchy: Scandinavia, Central Europe and Rus', c. 900–1200. Cambridge University Press. pp. 319–368. ISBN 978-0-521-87616-2.
- Buckton, David (1984). The Treasury of San Marco, Venice. Metropolitan Museum of Art.
- Curta, Florin (2006). Southeastern Europe in the Middle Ages, 500–1250. Cambridge University Press. ISBN 978-0-521-89452-4.
- Engel, Pál (2001). The Realm of St Stephen: A History of Medieval Hungary, 895–1526. I.B. Tauris Publishers. ISBN 1-86064-061-3.
- Györffy, György (1994). King Saint Stephen of Hungary. Atlantic Research and Publications. ISBN 0-88033-300-6.
- Györffy, György (2000). István király és műve [=King Stephen and his Work] (in Hungarian). Balassi Kiadó.
- Kontler, László (1999). Millennium in Central Europe: A History of Hungary. Atlantisz Publishing House. ISBN 963-9165-37-9.
- Kosztolnyik, Z.J. (1981). Five Eleventh Century Hungarian Kings: Their Policies and their Relations with Rome. Columbia University Press. ISBN 0-914710-73-7.
- Kristó, Gyula; Makk, Ferenc (1996). Az Árpád-ház uralkodói [=Rulers of the House of Árpád] (in Hungarian). I.P.C. Könyvek. ISBN 963-7930-97-3.
- Kristó, Gyula (1999). Az államalapítás korának írott forrásai [=Written Sources of the Ages of the Foundation of the State] (in Hungarian). Szegedi Középkorász Műhely. ISBN 963-482-393-9.
- Makk, Ferenc (1993). Magyar külpolitika (896–1196) [Hungarian External Politics (896–1196)] (in Hungarian). Szegedi Középkorász Műhely. ISBN 963-04-2913-6.
- Manteuffel, Tadeusz (1982). The Formation of the Polish State: The Period of Ducal Rule, 963–1194 (Translated and with an Introduction by Andrew Gorski). Wayne State University Press. ISBN 0-8143-1682-4.
- Robinson, I. S. (1999). Henry IV of Germany, 1056–1106. Cambridge University Press. ISBN 0-521-54590-0.
- Steinhübel, Ján (2011). "The Duchy of Nitra". In Teich, Mikuláš; Kováč, Dušan; Brown, Martin D. (eds.). Slovakia in History. Cambridge University Press. pp. 15–29. ISBN 978-0-521-80253-6.
- Wertner, Mór (1892). Az Árpádok családi története [=Family History of the Árpáds] (in Hungarian). Szabó Ferencz N.-eleméri plébános & Pleitz Fer. Pál Könyvnyomdája.

Andrew I of Hungary House of Árpád Born: c. 1015 Died: before 6 December 1060
Regnal titles
Preceded by Peter	King of Hungary; 1046–1060	Succeeded by Béla I
