= Anastasia of Kiev =

Queen of Hungary from 1046 to 1060

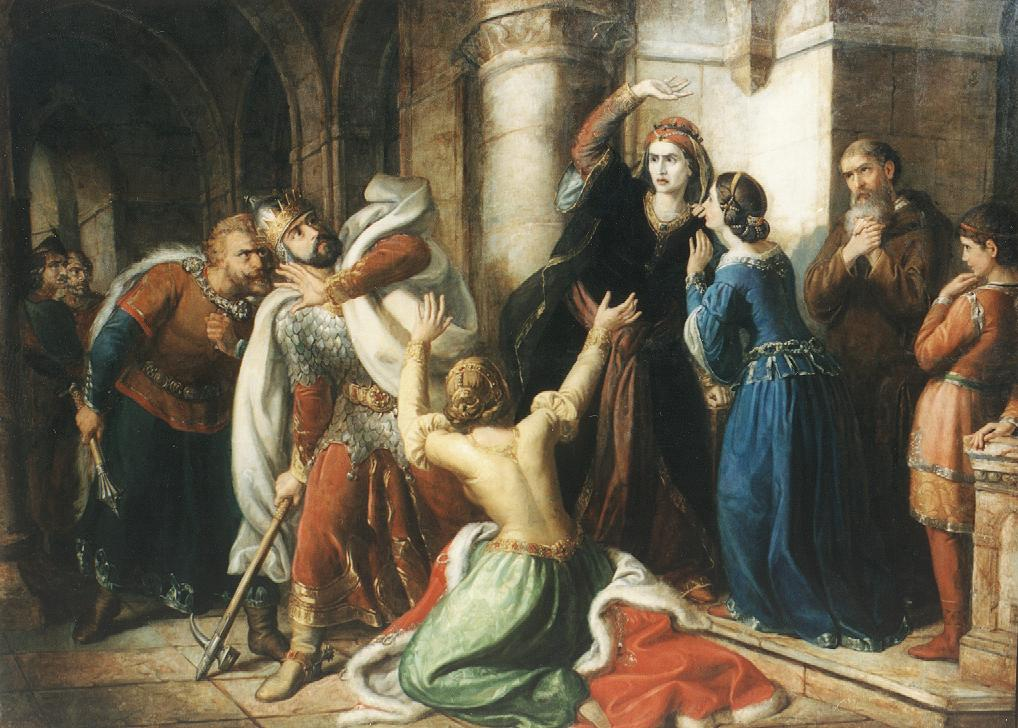
- "King Solomon Being Cursed by his Mother", by Soma Orlai Petrich (1857)

Queen consort of Hungary
- Tenure: 1046–1060
- Coronation: 1046
- Born: c. 1023
- Died: 1074/1096 [aged ~51/73] Admont Abbey, Styria
- Burial: Admont Abbey, Styria
- Spouse: Andrew I of Hungary
- Issue: Adelaide, Duchess of Bohemia; Solomon; David
- Anastasia Yaroslavna
- Dynasty: Rurik
- Father: Yaroslav the Wise
- Mother: Ingegerd Olofsdotter of Sweden

Anastasia of Kiev (Russian: Анастасия Ярославна, Anastasia Yaroslavna; Ukrainian: Анастасія Ярославна; c. 1023 – 1074/1094) was Queen of Hungary by marriage to King Andrew the White. Around 1038 Anastasia married Duke Andrew of Hungary.

== Marriage and children ==
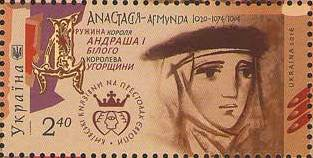
Anastasia portrayed on a 2016 Ukrainian stamp

c. 1039: King Andrew I of Hungary (c. 1015 – before 6 December 1060)

- Adelaide (c. 1040 – 27 January 1062), wife of king Vratislaus II of Bohemia
- King Solomon of Hungary (1053 – 1087)
- David of Hungary (after 1053 – after 1094)

== Sources ==
- Raffensperger, Christian (2012). Reimagining Europe:Kievan Rus in the Medieval World, 988-1146. Harvard University Press.
- Kristó, Gyula – Makk, Ferenc: Az Árpád-ház uralkodói (IPC Könyvek, 1996)
- Korai Magyar Történeti Lexikon (9–14. század), főszerkesztő: Kristó, Gyula, szerkesztők: Engel, Pál és Makk, Ferenc (Akadémiai Kiadó, Budapest, 1994)
- Magyarország Történeti Kronológiája I. – A kezdetektől 1526-ig, főszerkesztő: Benda, Kálmán (Akadémiai Kiadó, Budapest, 1981)

Anastasia of Kiev Rurik Dynasty Born: c. 1023 Died: c. 1074/1096
Royal titles
Preceded by daughter of Prince Géza? Last confirmed: Gisela of Bavaria	Queen consort of Hungary; 1046–1060	Succeeded by Richeza of Poland
