= Tihany Abbey =

Benedictine monastery in Hungary

Coordinates: 46°54′50″N 17°53′22″E

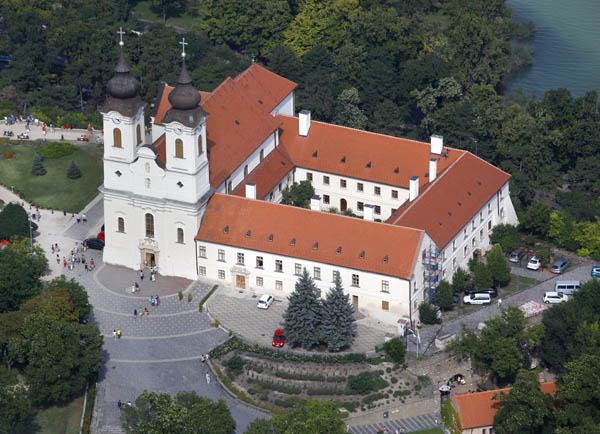
- Interactive map of Tihany Abbey

Monastery information
- Order: Benedictine
- Established: 1055
- Disestablished: 1950
- Reestablished: 1990s
- Dedication: 1763 (current church)
- Diocese: Veszprém

People
- Founder: Andrew I of Hungary

Site
- Location: Tihany, Veszprém County, Hungary

The Tihany Abbey is a Benedictine monastery established in Tihany in the Kingdom of Hungary in 1055. Its patrons are the Virgin Mary and Saint Aignan of Orleans.

== Foundation ==
The Benedictine monastery in Tihany was established in 1055 by King Andrew I of Hungary (r. 1046–1060). It was dedicated to the Holy Virgin and to Saint Bishop Aignan of Orleans. King Andrew was buried in the church of the monastery in 1060. His tomb in the crypt of the church is the only grave of a medieval King of Hungary which has been preserved up until now.

The 1055 foundation charter, listing the lands the king donated to the abbey, is known for including the oldest written words in the Hungarian language. It is mostly in Latin, but contains several Hungarian words and phrases, the longest of which is feheruuaru rea meneh hodu utu rea (in modern Hungarian: Fehérvárra menő hadi útra, 'onto the military road leading to Fehérvár'). The charter, written on vellum, is today in the Benedictine Pannonhalma Archabbey.

The church's ceiling is decorated with frescoes by Károly Lotz, depicting Faith, Hope and Love.

The monastery was reestablished in the 1990s, alongside the Bakonybél Abbey by monks of the Pannonhalma Archabbey. Tihany became an independent monastery within the Hungarian Benedictine Congregation in 2012. The current community has a 12 monks.

== Gallery ==
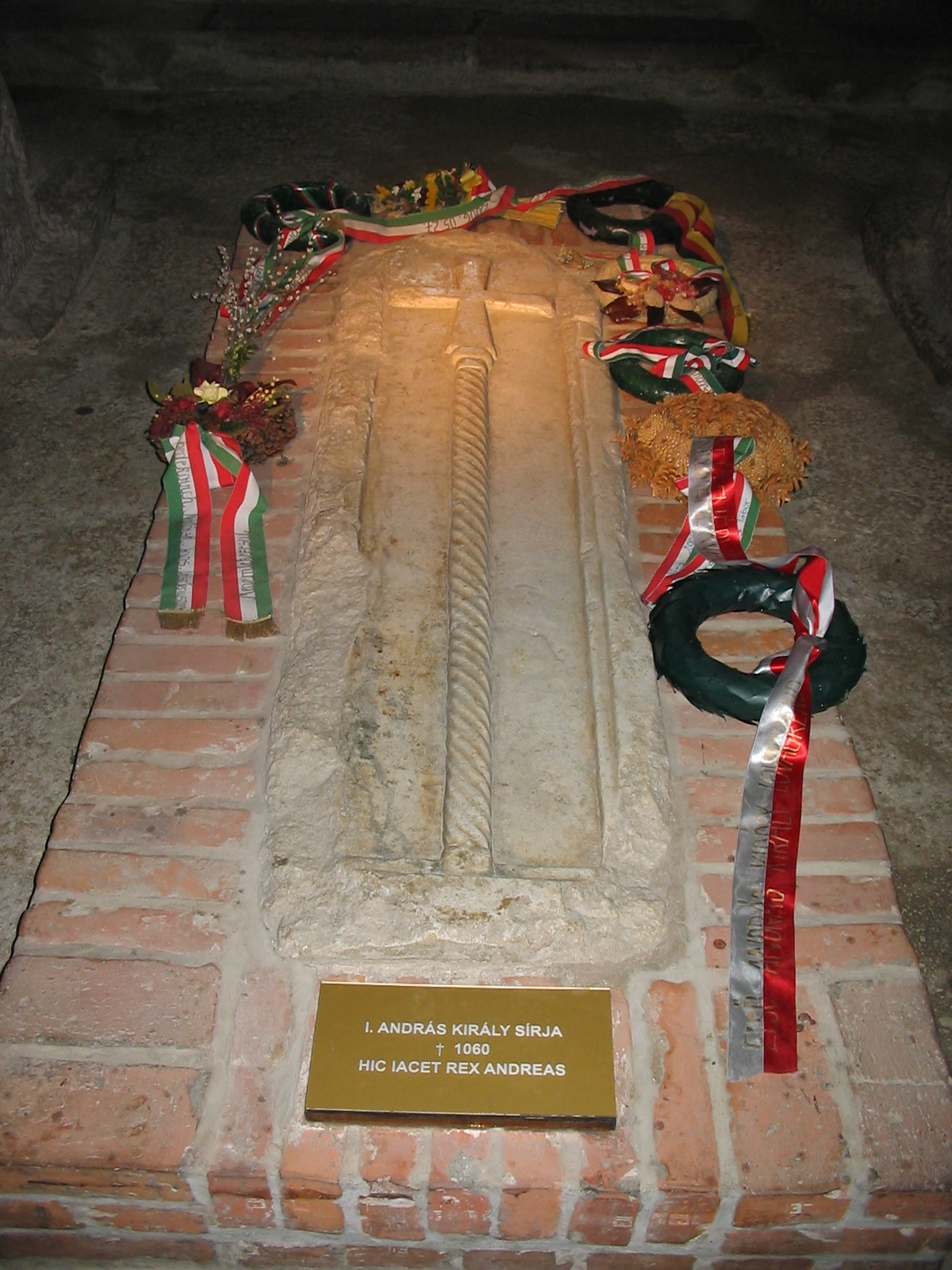
Tomb of Andrew I in the crypt

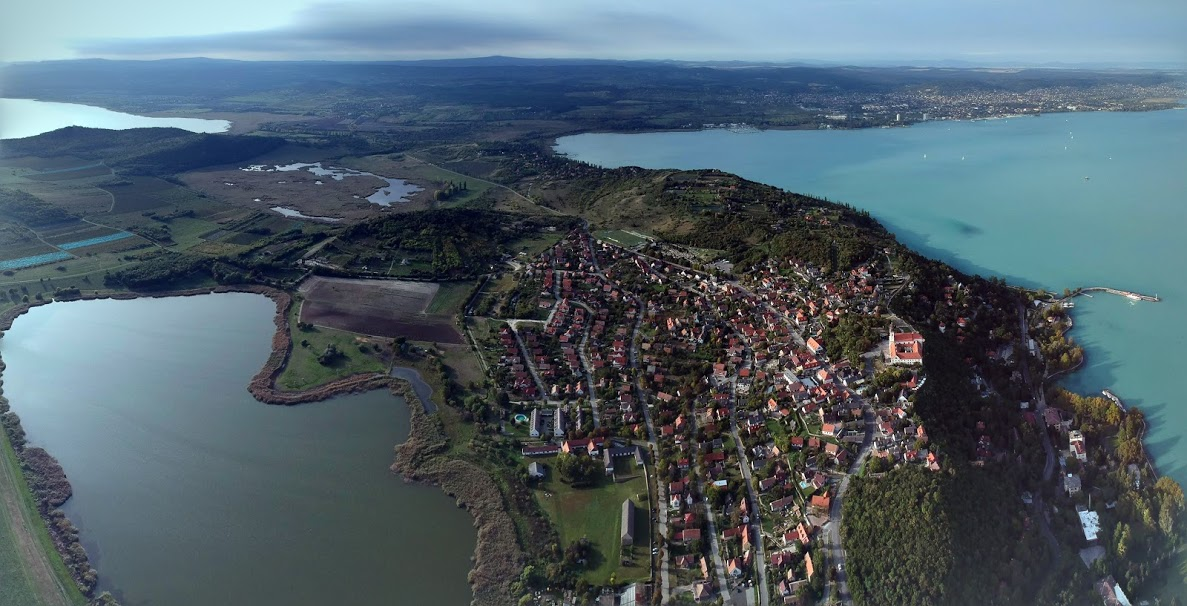
Tihany peninsula

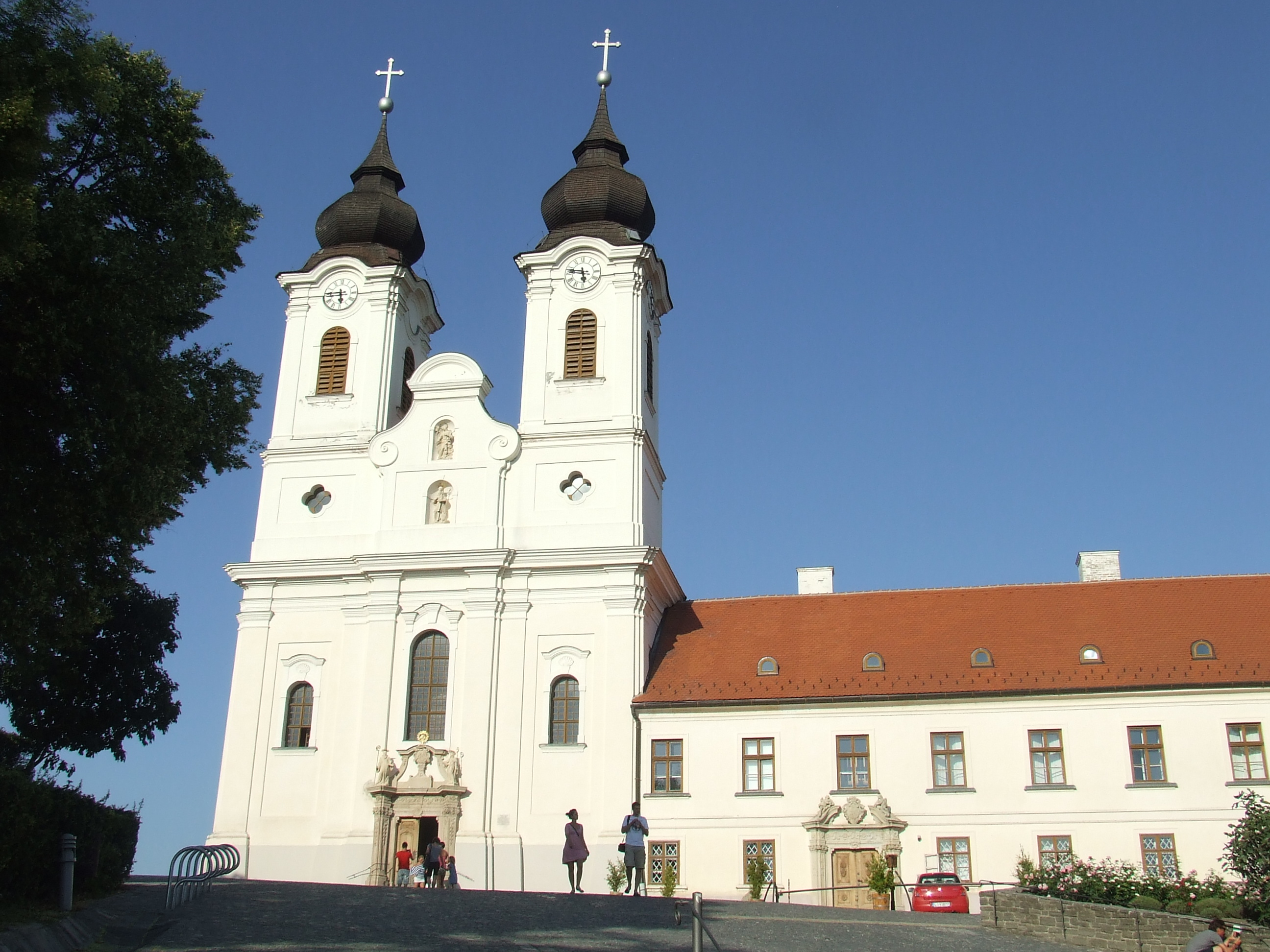

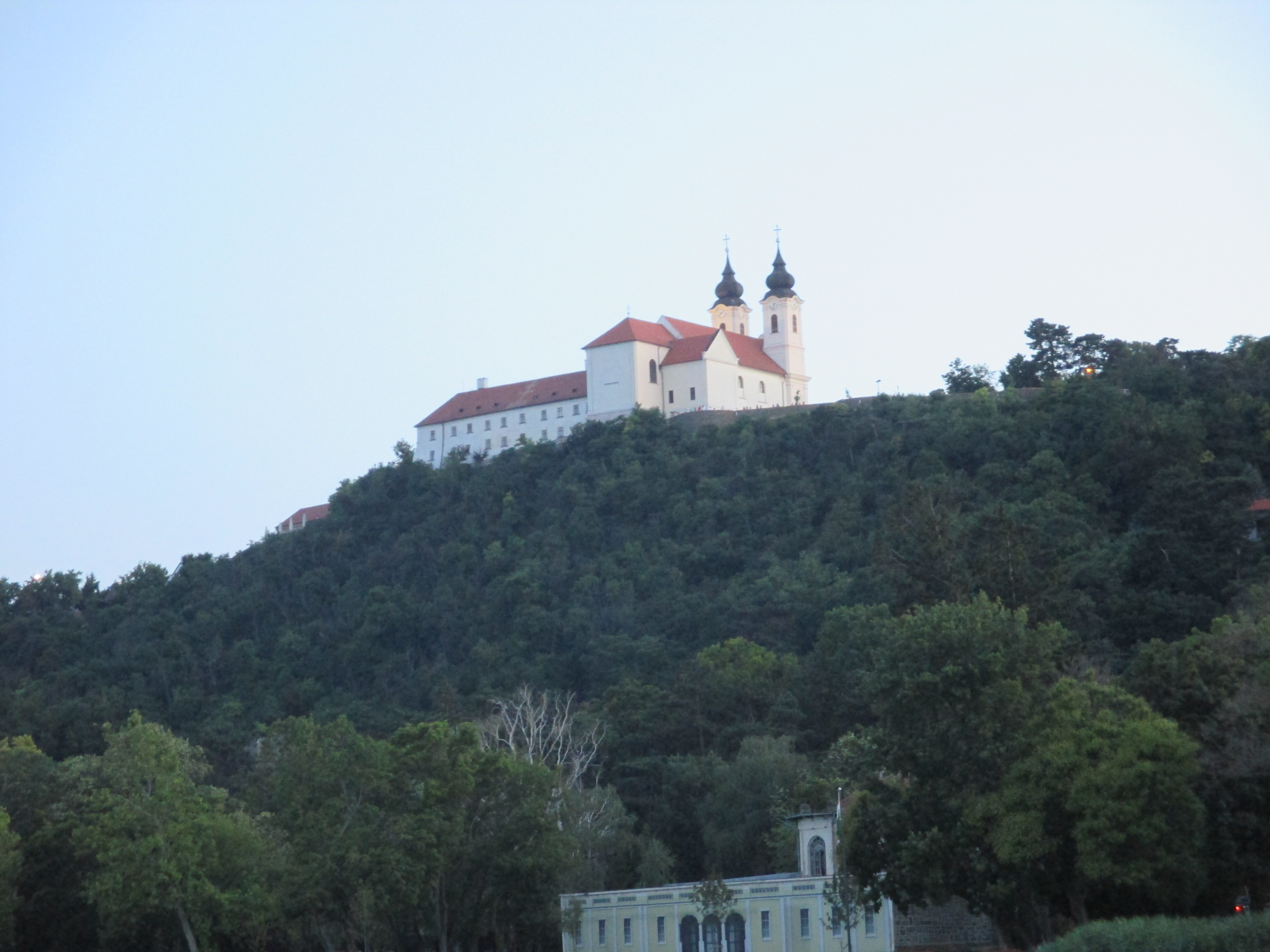

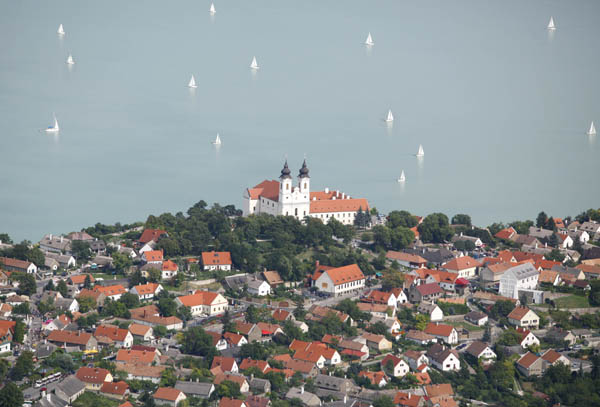

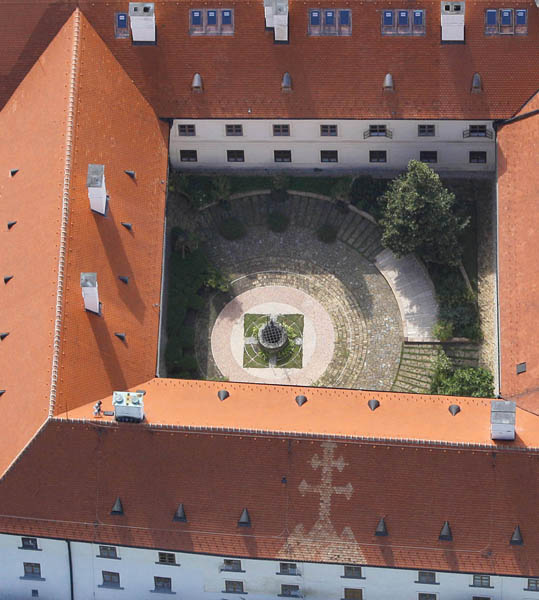

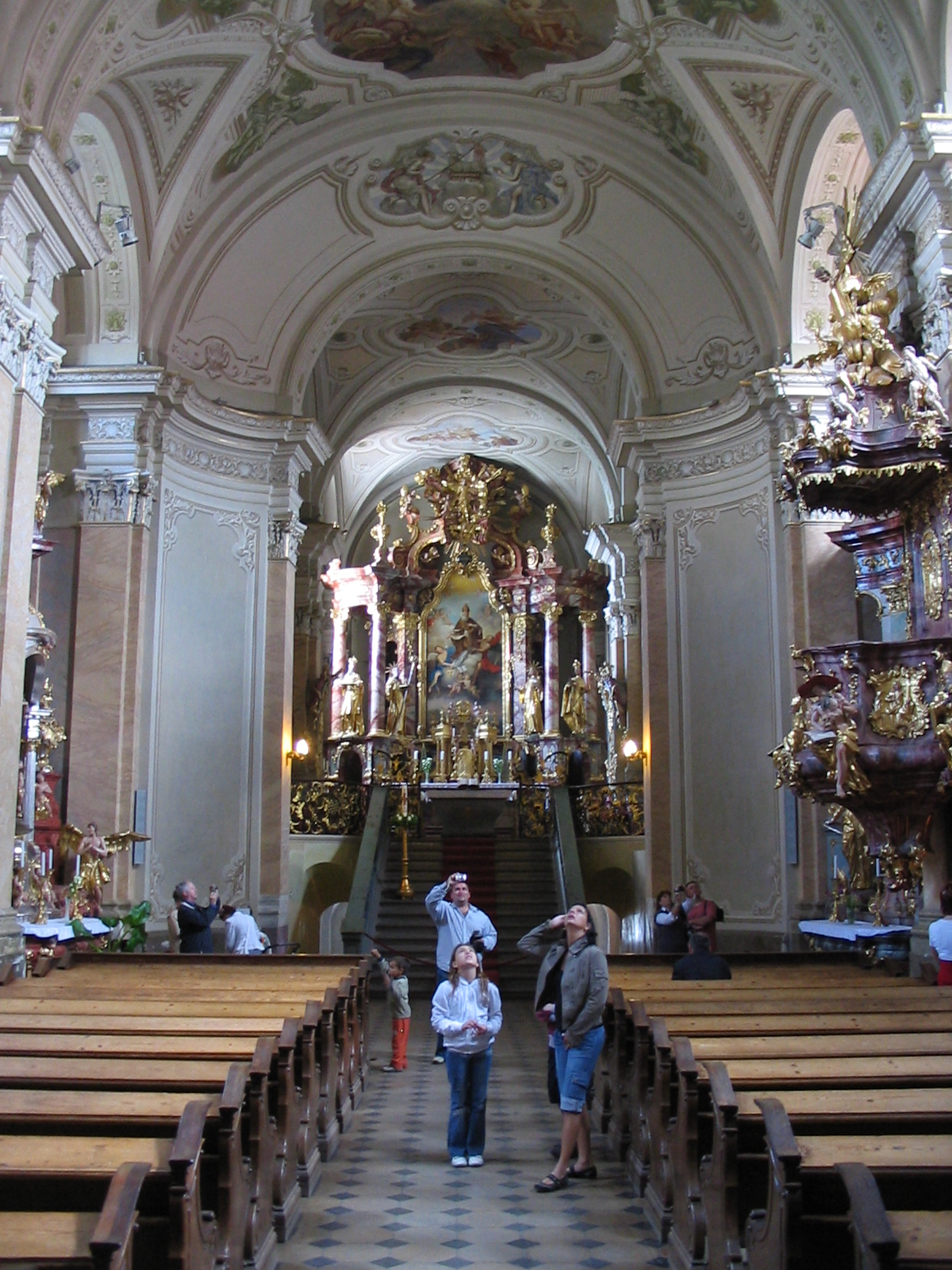

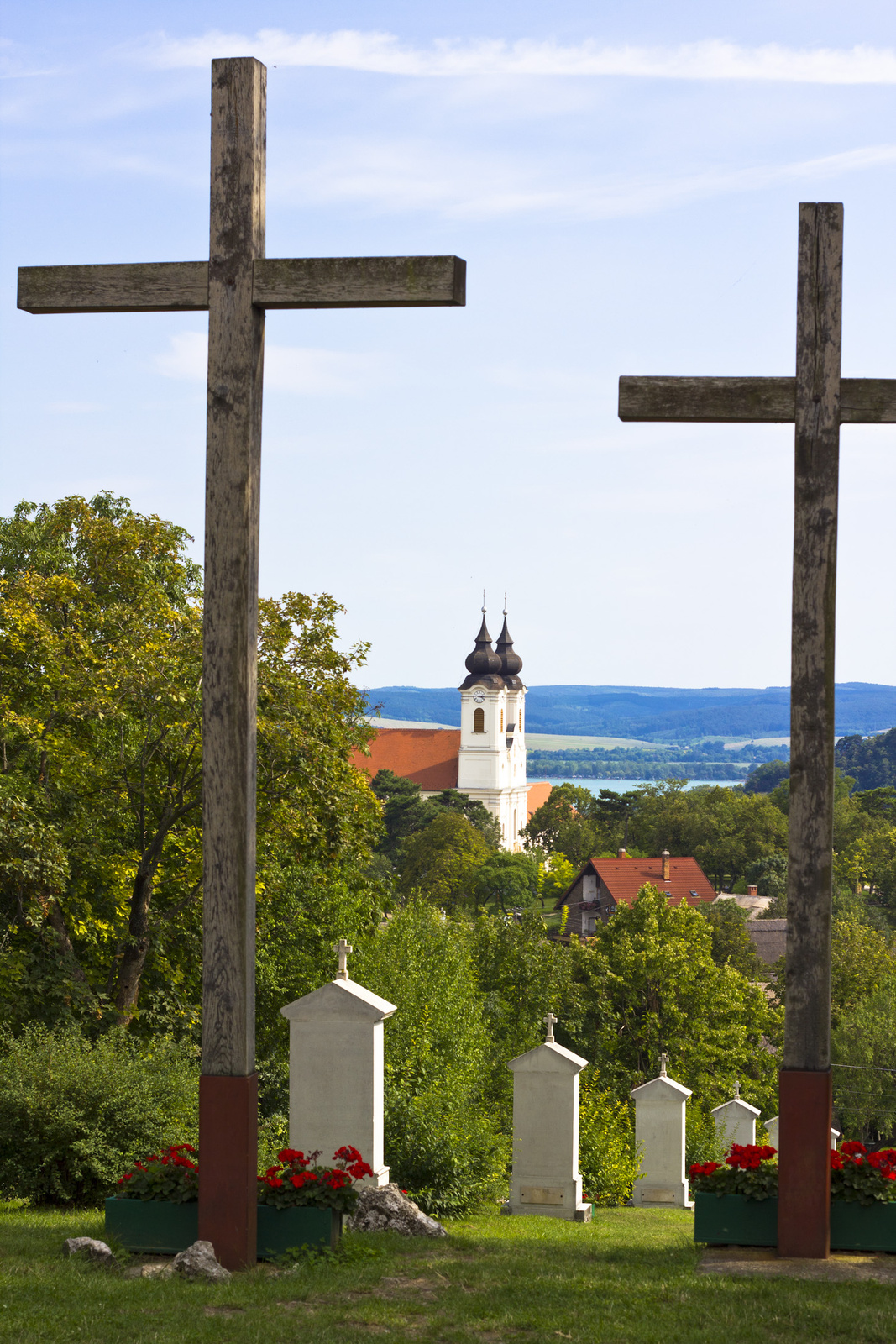

== See also ==
- Establishing charter of the abbey of Tihany

== Sources ==
- Berend, Nora; Laszlovszky, József; Szakács, Béla Zsolt (2007). "The kingdom of Hungary". In Berend, Nora (ed.). Christianization and the Rise of Christian Monarchy: Scandinavia, Central Europe and Rus', c.900-1200. Cambridge University Press. pp. 319–368. ISBN 978-0-521-87616-2.
- Csóka, Gáspár; Koszta, László (1994). "Tihany". In Kristó, Gyula; Engel, Pál; Makk, Ferenc (eds.). Korai magyar történeti lexikon (9-14. század) [=Encyclopedia of the Early Hungarian History (9th-14th centuries)] (in Hungarian). Akadémiai Kiadó. pp. 675–676. ISBN 963-05-6722-9.
