= Gesta Ladislai regis =

Hungarian 11th-12th century chronicle

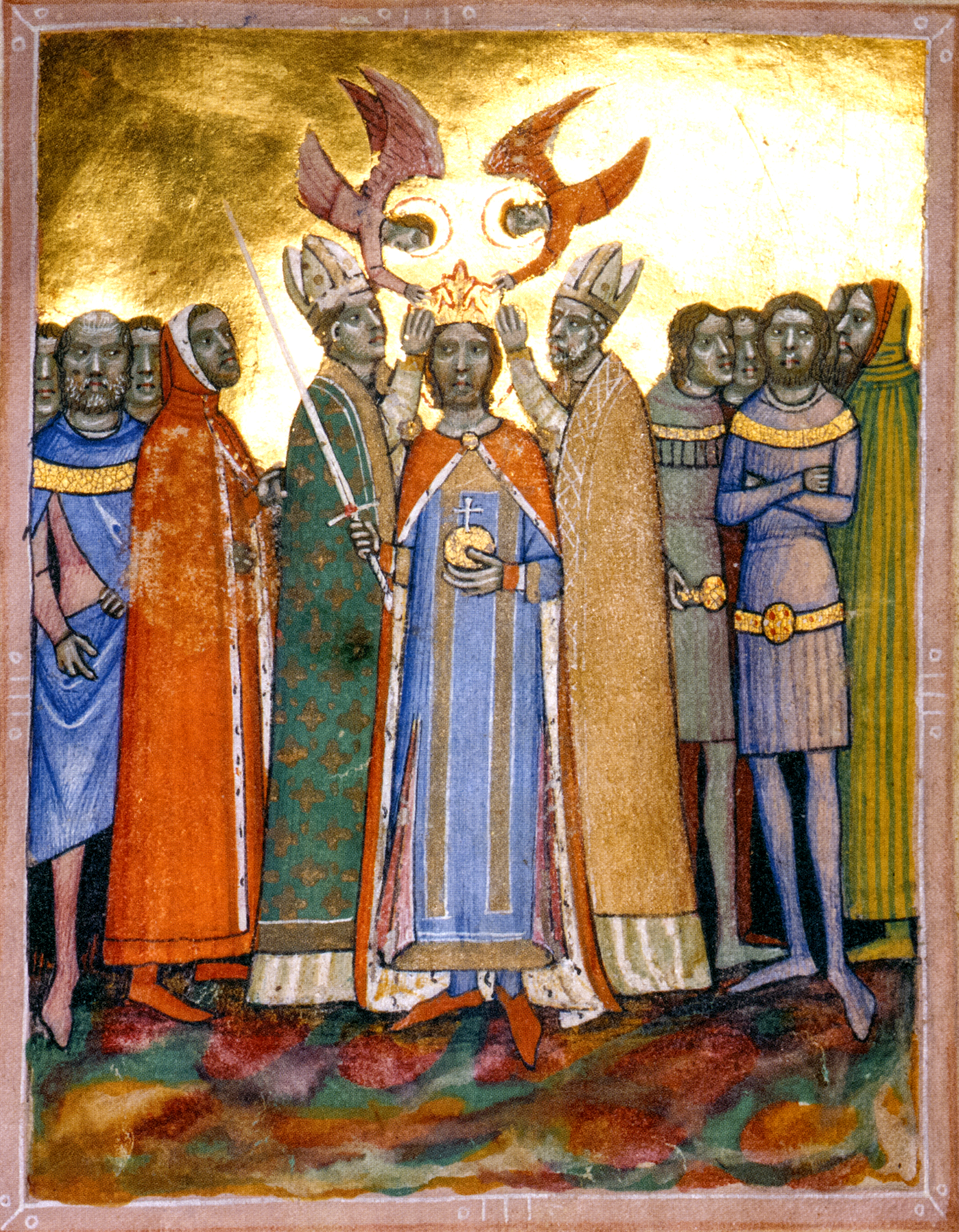
The coronation of Ladislaus I of Hungary as depicted in the Illuminated Chronicle

The Gesta Ladislai regis (lit. "The Deeds of King Ladislaus") is the historiographical name of a hypothetical Latin epic poem chronicling the life and reign of Ladislaus I of Hungary, which is believed to have been written at the turn of the 11th to the 12th-centuries. According to a scholarly theory, its text was inserted and dissolved into the corpus of various texts of the so-called 14th-century chronicle composition, most notably the Illuminated Chronicle.

== Interpretations ==
The 140th chapter of the Illuminated Chronicle writes that "whoever delights to know how many and how great were the good works wrought for his people by the blessed Ladislaus, will find full account of his deeds" ("[...] de gestis eiusdem plenam poterit habere notitiam"). It is uncertain whether the word "deeds" (gesta) refers to the Saint Ladislaus legend or to another chronicle variant. According to historian László Veszprémy, the quoted sentence is typical of chroniclers to draw readers' attention to hagiographical texts. Bálint Hóman considered this gesta is identical with Urgesta, the first Hungarian chronicle, which – as Hóman claimed – was compiled under Ladislaus I. In contrast, János Győry emphasized the phrase "full account of his deeds" is identical with the Saint Ladislaus legend, and the Latin word "gesta" is not a title here.

In his 1913 study, literary historian László Négyesy already outlined an epic poem inserted in the chronicle text narrating the events in 1071–1074, lasted from the siege of Belgrade (104th chapter) to the coronation of Géza I of Hungary (124th chapter). Classical philologist János Horváth, Jr. discovered a separate passage within the text of the chronicle from a stylistic and phraseological point of view, which narrates the events of the second half of the 11th century, from the 91st to the 139th chapter (from the coronation of the child Solomon to the establishment of the church of Várad). According to Horváth, this was the first continuation of the original Urgesta (compiled during the reign of Andrew I of Hungary, as Horváth claimed) and this section can be identified with the Gesta Ladislai regis, compiled under Coloman. Horváth claimed that its author, who wrote his work around 1109, was a descendant of knights Vecelin and Opos the Brave (Ubul Kállay and Bálint Hóman identified this person with bishop Koppány). Historian József Gerics agreed that the aforementioned quote refers to the chronicle written during the reign of Coloman. Historian Elemér Mályusz considered that the Urgesta was continued in the early 12th century, under the guidance of Coloman, and in the centre of that continuation is St. Ladislaus (as a result, Mályusz called this expansion as "Gesta Ladislai regis") and its tone is sharply anti-Solomon. Mályusz claimed this text utilized songs in Hungarian and oral folk traditions. The chronicler also inserted the text of the Urgesta in order to mitigate its basic anti-German perception. Sharing the viewpoint of Horváth, linguist János Bollók identified the Gesta Ladislai regis (compiled under Coloman) in the chronicle text lasted from the 94th to the 141st chapters, which narrates the history of Hungary between 1060 (coronation of Béla I) and 1095 (death of Ladislaus I). This text primarily tells the struggles for the throne between Solomon and his cousins, Géza and Ladislaus. János M. Bak and Ryszard Grzesik considered that the Gesta Ladislai regis covered the 102–141st chapters (from 1067 to 1095), where Ladislaus I appears as central figure of the events.

Literary historian Tibor Klaniczay argued that it is questionable whether only individual heroic songs served as sources, and whether the entire story was already composed by the chronicler, or whether the Latin writer relied on an already established larger poetic composition. In the latter case, it is likely that the author of the chronicle did not translate it into Latin, but considered it a source, fragmented it, or even modified its tendency, supplementing it with his own knowledge.

== Content ==
=== Chapters ===
Chapter(s)	Illumination	Description
91–93		King Andrew I crowned his son, the five-year-old Solomon in 1058. The king's brother Béla had to choose between the crown and the sword ("the scene at Várkony"). The civil war between Andrew – who was supported by the Holy Roman Empire – and Béla, who defeated his brother and ascended the throne in 1060.
94–96		The coronation of Béla I. The author glorifies and exalts his reign, for instance, the king crushed the pagan revolt in 1061. The chronicler mentions Béla's accidental death in 1063, but he does not connect it to the renewal of warfare.
97–99		Henry IV of Germany invaded Hungary in order to restore his brother-in-law Solomon to the throne. Béla's sons, Géza, Ladislaus and Lampert fled to Poland. Later, Géza returned to Hungary and reconciled with his cousin after a mediation process. Solomon granted to Géza his father's one-time duchy in 1064. The fire in Pécs predicted the future tensions between them. The king and the duke closely cooperated in the subsequent years. They jointly participated in the campaign against the Carantanians or Venetians in Dalmatia. Both of them were present at the consecration of the Zselicszentjakab Abbey in 1066.
100		The chronicler laments that Andrew's sons, Solomon and David remained childless due to "divine decree", while Géza had descendants.
101		With this chapter, the chronicler began to insert a lost epic poem of the chivalresque tradition around the hero Opos and then of the deeds of St. Ladislaus. The Bohemians broke into Hungary and plundered the region of Trencsén in 1067. Solomon and the dukes launched retaliatory campaign into Bohemia. There, Opos defeated a giant Czech warrior in a duel.
102–103		The "Cumans", in fact Pechenegs (and/or Ouzes) broke into Hungary through the passes of the Carpathian Mountains in 1068, plundering and devastating the region. King Solomon and his cousins, Dukes Géza and Ladislaus, gathered their troops at the fortress of Doboka to give battle to the marauders. The Hungarians annihilated the invaders in the Battle of Kerlés. When a "Cuman" warrior tried to escape from the battlefield, taking a beautiful girl from Várad – thought to be a daughter of the local bishop – with him. Ladislaus fought a duel with the "Cuman", and despite being wounded he killed the "pagan". This story became the best known part of the emerging Saint Ladislaus legend after the king's death.
104–109		Pecheneg troops pillaged Syrmia in the autumn of 1071. The Hungarians suspected that the Byzantine garrison at Belgrade incited the marauders, they decided to attack the fortress. After defeating the Pecheneg auxiliary units by the troops of counts Vid and Jan, the Hungarians captured Belgrade after a siege of three months too. The author describes in detail the course of the siege, including Opos' heroic deeds there. However, the Byzantine commander, Niketas, surrendered the fortress to the "God-fearing" Duke Géza instead of the impetuous king, who "listened to the vile counsels of Count Vid", which planted the seeds of their conflict. The relationship between Solomon and Géza had further deteriorated, when the king granted only a quarter of the war booty to the duke, who claimed its third part.
110		Géza negotiated with the Byzantine Emperor's envoys and set all the Byzantine captives free without Solomon's consent. Thereafter, the conflict was further sharpened by Count Vid, who urged the king repeatedly that he should banish Géza and then take the duchy from him. Solomon maintained a pretend alliance with his cousins for the time being.
111–113		Solomon and Géza continued jointly the war against the Byzantine Empire in 1072, but Ladislaus remained in Hungary with his army. The envoys of Niš gave rich gifts to the Hungarians, who marched into the city. After their return from the campaign, both Solomon and Géza began to make preparations for their inevitable conflict and were seeking assistance from abroad. Ladislaus visited the Kievan Rus', but he returned without reinforcements. Solomon and Géza, with the mediation of eight-eight prelates and lords, concluded a truce in Esztergom. Solomon sent his envoys, Vid and Ernyei to the court of Géza, while the king negotiated with three German dukes in order to assist the war against his enemy. The king and the duke concluded another truce, which was to last from November 1073 until April 1074.
114–116		Solomon spent Christmas 1073 in the western borderland, where Duke Markwart of Carinthia and Count Vid urged him to launch a military campaign against Géza despite their truce. When the royal entourage stayed in Szekszárd Abbey, Vid again argued for war referring to the fact that Géza sent his brothers Ladislaus and Lampert to seek assistance from Kievan Rus' and Poland respectively. Vid – who wished Géza's duchy for himself – suggested to unexpectedly attack the duke who was "hunting in Igfan Forest". The abbot William, concealed in a hidden room, listened while they took counsel. He immediately sent a messenger to the duke with letters warning him, but Géza's advisors – Petrud, Szolnok and Bikács –, who secretly served Solomon, convinced the duke that the abbot had sent the envoy to him in his drunkenness. Géza believed them and remained in Igfan, but he also sent Ladislaus to Bohemia to request military assistance from their brother-in-law Duke Otto I of Olomouc. After Solomon accepted Vid's counsel, William left the abbey in disguise and hurried to Duke Géza, whom he woke up and warned of the danger. Géza, having gathered his army, wished to proceed as quickly as possible to Bohemia, but the arriving royal army blocked his path.
117–118		The two armies met at Kemej on the left bank of the river Tisza on 26 February 1074. Géza's advisors secretly sent messengers to the king to say that if the king would confirm them in their dignities, they would desert Géza and swear loyalty to Solomon. The king agreed to this and the royal army crossed Tisza. The significant superior force defeated Géza's army. The traitors, Petrud and Bikács, together with their detachments, fled the battlefield raised their shields as a sign that the king's soldiers should not attack them. But Solomon's army, not knowing this sign, pursued them to their destruction, so that very few of those traitors escaped death. The fleeing Géza crossed Tisza at Kotojd and rode to Vác, where his brothers and brother-in-law, Otto, were already waiting for him. Géza "wept in bitter sorrow", because he lost many of his men, but Ladislaus encouraged him that he should not weep but rather implore the "mercy of the almighty God". The chronicler also narrates Opos' deeds during the battle. As a soldier of the royal army, he defeated knight Peter from Géza's army in a duel, winning the admiration of Solomon and the Germans.
119–120		The king's army crossed the frozen Tisza at Kotojd (near Péteri), where Gurcu (son of the aforementioned Peter) sheltered Solomon and his entourage in his manor. There, Solomon was informed that Géza had concluded an alliance with the Bohemians. Vid urged the decisive battle to be fought belittling the fighting value of Géza's army, while Ernyei burst into tears, protesting against the fratricidal war. The king, misinterpreting his tears, accused the peace-loving Ernyei of disloyalty. Solomon listened to Vid's advice again and the royal army advanced to the Rákos field (in present-day Budapest). Meanwhile, the duke's army gathered around Vác. There, Ladislaus "saw in broad daylight a vision from heaven" of an angel placing a crown on Géza's head, predicting Géza's ultimate victory and Solomon's fall from power. In response, Géza promised to erect a church in Vác.
121–122		The dukes' army moved camp and halted at Cinkota (present-day a borough of Budapest). The two armies were separated by the mountain of Mogyoród. The following days were full of active reconnaissance work on both sides. The chronicler narrates the participants' final thoughts; when he had put on his armor, Ladislaus prostrated himself on the ground, asked for the grace of Almighty God. The army stood up, Géza was in the center, while Ladislaus and Otto were positioned on the left and right wings, respectively. Another legendary episode also predicted the dukes' triumph over the king: an "ermine of purest white" jumped from a thorny bush to Ladislaus' lance and then onto his chest, while the prince rode around encouraging and inspiring his soldiers. On the enemy's side, Vid remained optimistic, while Ernyei warned that due to the location of their army (they stationed on lower ground, while the Danube flowed behind their back), Géza had decided whether victory or death would be his fate. The Battle of Mogyoród took place on 14 March 1074. The Bohemian auxiliary troops routed Vid's detachment in the first moments of the skirmish. Ladislaus switched his banner with Géza's to confuse Solomon. The dukes' army annihilated the royal troops and their allies, the Germans and "Latins". Solomon fled the scene with the help of Opos. Counts Vid and Ernyei were killed in the battlefield. Ladislaus mourned the deaths of both, but Vid's corpse was desecrated by Géza's soldiers. Solomon's allies, Markwart and Svatopluk were wounded and captured. Otto returned home to Bohemia with rich gifts.
123		Solomon had taken refuge in Moson at the western frontier of Hungary. His mother Anastasia blamed her son for the defeat, because he "always followed the counsel of Vid", which filled Solomon with so much anger that he wanted to "strike his mother in the face". His wife held him back by catching his hand. Solomon maintained his rule in the regions of Moson and Pozsony.
124		Géza I took possession of almost the entire kingdom and accepted the throne "at the insistence of the Hungarians". Géza and Ladislaus jointly returned to Vác, where the church in honor of the Virgin Mother is to be built. Suddenly a red deer appeared to them with many candles burning upon his horns. Ladislaus explained the significance of the wondrous appearance of the deer at the place where the church would be erected.
125		Géza hired Pechenegs, in exchange for privilege, to attack Solomon's forts along the western borderland. Solomon sought assistance from Ernest, Margrave of Austria against the Pechenegs led by their chieftain Zoltán. Ernest was only willing to intervene in the battle if Solomon's forces were on the verge of victory. Solomon defeated the Pechenegs alone and refused the pay Ernest.
126–128		Solomon gradually lost his internal support, thus he sent his envoys to Henry IV to seek assistance against Géza, and he was ready to accept the German monarch's suzerainty. Henry IV invaded Hungary in August 1074. Clashes took place at the walls of Nyitra, in which Opos also participated. The imperial army had proceeded as far as Vác. Géza I contacted and bribed Sigehard, the patriach of Aquileia and other German dukes to convince Henry IV to return home. After an organized riot within the military camp, the German king left Hungary in September 1074, taking his sister, Solomon's wife with him.
129–130		Solomon barricaded himself in Pozsony after the Germans' withdrawal. Ladislaus, who was granted the duchy by his brother, constantly besieged the fort in 1076. Knights fought each other in front of the castle. Solomon and Ladislaus were both disguised as common soldiers, and, unaware of each other's identities, they fought each other in a duel. When Solomon saw two angels with fiery swords over Ladislaus' head, he fled back to the fort. Thereafter, Solomon's soldiers surrendered to Ladislaus, who set them free. Meanwhile, Géza celebrated Christmas at Szekszárd. After the mass, the king prostrated himself with tears before Archbishop Desiderius and the other prelates, saying that he usurped the crown from a lawfully crowned king and considered renouncing the throne in favor of Solomon. Accordingly, Géza decided to start new negotiations with Solomon, but soon fell seriously ill and died in April 1077.
131		After the death of his brother, Ladislaus I was proclaimed king "by common consent, equal desire, and unanimous will". The chronicler lists all virtues of Ladislaus, which made him fit to rule. He also emphasizes that Ladislaus was reluctant to take the throne, which, according to the Gregorian interpretation, was characteristic of a good monarch too.
132		Ladislaus I conquered Dalmatia, then Croatia "in perpetuity to his kingdom" after the death of his brother-in-law, Demetrius Zvonimir, when his sister Helena requested his intervention. The chronicler emphasizes Ladislaus' legitimacy to the Croatian throne.
133–136		Ladislaus reconciled with Solomon in 1081, "giving him revenues sufficient for the expenses of a king". Because the nobility refused to share in the rule of the realm, Solomon remained wracked with anger and bitterness. After the revelation of his conspiracy, Ladislaus captured and imprisoned him in Visegrád. The chronicler emphasizes that Ladislaus imprisoned his cousin not out of fear, but because of Solomon's wickedness, and in the event of the latter's conversion Ladislaus would have been ready to abdicate the throne. Solomon had been released from prison on the occasion of the canonization of Saint Stephen in 1083. Solomon fled to Kutesk, leader of the Cumans, and asked for his help against Ladislaus, for which he offered him Transylvania in return and promised to take his daughter as wife. The Cumans stormed into eastern Hungary in 1085. Ladislaus' army successfully repelled the attack; many Cumans were killed, but Solomon and Kutesk escaped. Thereafter, Solomon took part in the Cumans' failed raids in Bulgaria. The author narrates Solomon's later life: his penance, spiritual conversion and self-exile in Pula on the Istrian Peninsula.
137		The Cumans – led by Kapolcs, son of Krul – invaded and plundered the eastern part of the kingdom in 1091. Ladislaus immediately returned from his Slavonian campaign with his army and caught up with the Cumans who were retreating with their spoils at the river Temes. Ladislaus defeated them, Kapolcs was among those who were killed. Thereafter, the Hungarians rooted another invading Cuman army along the border, and Ladislaus himself killed their leader Ákos.
138		Since the Cumans were incited by the "Ruthenians", Ladislaus invaded the neighboring Rus' principalities, forcing the "Ruthenians" to ask "for mercy" and to promise "that they would be faithful to him in all things".
138		Then, Ladislaus marched into Poland in 1093. The Hungarians were victorious in a battle against the Poles. Ladislaus also besieged Kraków for three months during the campaign; the defenders surrendered the castle after starvation. Thence the Hungarian king crossed Bohemia and took many captives taking into Hungary.
139		As he was hunting in Bihar County, Ladislaus – "being advised by an angel" – erected a monastery called Várad. The chronicler praises Ladislaus, who "went from strength to strength and from virtue to virtue", and – within the framework of a purely fictional narrative – he was even offered the imperial crown after the death of Henry IV, but he refused.
140		The author also adds that several foreign envoys visited Ladislaus in Bodrog on Easter 1095, asking him to lead their crusade to the Holy Land. The king accepted the task "with a great joy". Ladislaus sent his messenger to Conrad I, Duke of Bohemia (the son of the late Otto) to join the cause. However Conrad was deprived by his relative Svatopluk, and Conrad sought the assistance of Ladislaus. He assembled his army and launched campaign against Svatopluk. However, Ladislaus fell ill at the border of Hungary with Bohemia. The ailing king sent his envoys, provost Marcellus and ispán Peter, to his nephew Coloman, who took refuge in Poland, to return to Hungary. Ladislaus decided to appoint Álmos as his heir.
141		Ladislaus "joined the company of the angels" in 1095, and was buried in Várad.

=== Depictions ===
The Gesta Ladislai regis – following a brief summary of the events of the previous decades – picks up the thread of the story with the characterization and glorification of the reign of Béla I, the father of Géza and Ladislaus, similarly to the Saint Ladislaus hagiography, which may have been written partly based on the gesta. Within this text, the chronicler utilized and inserted an epic heroic poem narrating the conflict of Solomon and his cousins.

While medieval historians generally rationally justify, interpret, and evaluate events, always within the framework of dynastic considerations, the author of the Gesta Ladislai regis has not a rational, but a poetic motivation for the chain of events. The events surrounding the conflict between Solomon and the dukes and the Battle of Mogyoród are driven forward by human, psychological factors, i.e. the author attributes the cause of the discord between Solomon and the dukes to mere differences in character. For instance, the defenders of Belgrade in 1071 surrendered not to the king, but to Duke Géza because of the latter's merciful character. The envoys of the Byzantine emperor also negotiated with Géza, instead of the king, regarding the exchange of the Greek prisoners. The king was deeply offended by this; he perceived the behavior of the prisoners and the messengers as a disrespect to his royal dignity. From this insult arose first his jealousy, then his hatred for his cousin, which his wicked advisor, Count Vid, further inflamed. Thus, the conflict developed according to the laws of poetic composition, from the characters and the relationships thus established, without any external intervention.

Ernyei appears as patron of the king, who, with his favorable advice, strives to prevent the occurrence of his monarch's tragedy until the very last moment. He is the king's good spirit. In contrast, Vid stirs up tension and resembles a scheming snake. The two advisors thus represent Solomon's dual nature, of which evil ultimately prevails. This symbolism also explains the ermine portent, which appears before the decisive battle; a white ermine runs up onto Ladislaus's lance, which then sits down in the prince's lap. According to medieval symbolism, the ermine symbolizes the Virgin Mary. The author, who is on Ladislaus' side, implies that at Mogyoród himself Satan had fought against the dukes who were under the protection of Mary. This is confirmed by the oath of Géza, who swears that upon victory he will establish a church in memory of Mary in Vác.

The flow of the story is constantly interrupted by parts that show the heroic deeds of Opos the Brave, despite the fact that the knight fought on Solomon's side. It is very likely that the reason for this was the author's family connection to the person aforementioned warrior. Opos functions as the story's Achilles.

The author also tries to question the legitimacy of Solomon's reign after his fall (126th chapter). First, he makes Solomon admit that it was the will of the emperor that made him king, and thus deprives him of the opportunity to defend his kingship by referring to his coronation and anointing. Solomon declares: Hungary is the regnum of Henry IV, Holy Roman Emperor. This is even more frank speech than Peter's. Solomon is further portrayed as a taxpayer and vassal of the emperor. Géza and Ladislaus thus removed Solomon from royal power, which he had legally never enjoyed. The influence and utilization of chronicler Lambert of Hersfeld can be seen in this text. The Gesta also suggested this to the reader not only by emphasizing the excellence of Géza I, Ladislaus I, and Coloman, but also by suggesting that Solomon and his younger brother, David, were left without descendants as a divine punishment. Since Géza then Ladislaus deprived Solomon, who inherited the Hungarian throne, the author had to recur to the notion of idoneitas, a concept always advocated by the church, as one that would guarantee the correct choice of the ruler who would keep peace to the people and the clergy.

As a result of all these contradictions, according to Klaniczay, it is questionable who the protagonist of the original epic poem could have been: Solomon, Géza or Ladislaus? After his fall, Solomon remains at the center of the narrative, while Ladislaus' reign is given a much more elaborate place in the surviving chronicle text. It is conceivable that the chronicler transformed the original pro-Solomon work in order to emphasize idoneitas. Historian Gyula Kristó argued that the text includes some interpolations; the texts, where only Géza is mentioned as a duke, form a coherent story, while the 14th-century excerpted text alternates between dux and duces, magnifying the importance of Ladislaus. Based on this, historian Péter Rokay considered only those parts where Géza appears as the sole duke to be authentic.

== Style ==
The literary style of the Gesta Ladislai regis exhibits numerous features that make the work as a whole unique in all of medieval Hungarian literature, as literary historian László Négyesy outlined already in his work Árpádkori compositio in 1913. Besides its poetic perspective, the other striking characteristic of the Gesta Ladislai regis is its compositional depth and unity, whose style contrasts sharply with the rest of the 14th-century chronicle composition, for which it also earned the recognition of the 19th-century Hungarian poet János Arany, who first referred to this text as a lost epic poem and suspected a vernacular epic in its background. He compared the description of the Siege of Belgrade with Homer's Iliad centered around the Trojan War. Négyesy argued the whole gesta may have been based on an epic song originally in Hungarian, with its excellent exposition, interesting complication, characters endowed with distinctive qualities and epically prepared and magnificent final battle surrounded by miracles. József Deér rejected these approaches in 1931. János Horváth, Jr. emphasized that the artistic self-conscious composition is not supported by the sequence of these chapters, despite the fact that no other place in the chronicle text abounds in details of such poetic beauty as this section.

János Horváth, Jr. presented the influences of the folk heroic epic in the text, considering the most striking to be the "stereotyped repetition and constant return of epic turns". Although he did not discover a unified poetic composition in the text, in his opinion, numerous stylistic elements indicate the influence of ancient songs and legends. He considered such evidence to include, among others, the speech similes believed to be of archaic origin.

János Bollók determined its genre as heroic verse, and to prove this, he outlined four characteristics of the work:

1. frequently use of epitheton ornans; for instance, Vid appears with the attributive "detestabilis" ("evil" or "malicious") three times, while another royal advisor, Ernyei, who seek reconciliation Solomon and his cousins, is styled as "pacis amateur" ("lover of peace") twice. Regarding the knightly hero Opos the Brave, not only the adjective "gloriosus" recur several times, but the repetition of certain phrases such as "singulari certamine", or "in modo fulguris", can also be observed. Ernyei's epithet reflects the impact of Jordanes.
2. symmetry in the structure of the narrative; for instance, the armed clash takes place in two parts: in the Battle of Kemej, Salamon is victorious, and Géza flees; in contrast, Géza is victorious in the Battle of Mogyoród, and Salamon is forced to flee. On the eve of the latter battle, counts Vid and Ernyei consider their prospects in Solomon's camp; dukes Géza and Ladislaus do the same thing in their respective camp. The repetition of the same phrases and the symmetrical structure appear simultaneously in the scenes of the mutual sending of envoys during the early stage of conflict. The author has asserted the principle of symmetry to such an extent that he also sought to maintain balance in the persons of the envoys: the "evil" Vid and the "gentle" Ernyei as Solomon's envoys, or the "deceitful" Vata and the "capable" bishop of Várad as Géza's envoys. Both the king and the duke imprisoned and guarded the enemy's emissaries.
3. repeated phrases in battle descriptions; for instance collecto exercitu, ordinatis agminibus and missis nuntiis.
4. proverb-like comparisons which appear almost only here in the entire chronicle text; e.g. "With the strokes of their swords they severed the freshly shaven heads of the Cumans like unripe gourds" and "Across the way, the soldiers of Géza pour out the cups of dire death to them. The Teutons [Germans] yield, the Latins fight on, they find no place to flee, and they fall before the Hungarians, like oxen in a slaughterhouse".

The Gesta Ladislai regis narrates the Battle of Mogyoród, which is the most artistically and carefully crafted section, in 32 four-syllable bars, which combine to form 16 consecutive eight-syllable verses with a caesura in the middle. According to János Bollók, it is a type of prosimetrum whose basic rhythmic units were formed by the four-syllable or three-syllable bars, which probably reflect the meter of Hungarian heroic poetry. János Horváth, Jr. argued that the use of rhymed prose, in addition to the witty puns, distinguishes the lines of the Gesta Ladislai regis from the rest of the text of the chronicle.

=== Classical antiquity phrases ===
Chapter	Phrase/Description	Classical analogy
107	Siege of Belgrade (1071)	Trojan War
121	Battle of Mogyoród	dextrarius ("war horse", Pharsalia by Lucan); praestolor (e.g. Ammianus Marcellinus, Sidonius Apollinaris); arduus equus ("hard horse", Georgica by Virgil); pocula dire mortis eisdem propinarunt ("they [Géza's army] poured out to them [Solomon's army] the cups of dire death", proverb originally referring to the forced suicide of Socrates by poisoning, also used by e.g. Lucan, Cicero, Historia Langobardorum by Paul the Deacon, writings of Augustine of Hippo, hagiography of Cuthbert by Bede, Annales Quedlinburgenses)
122	Battle of Mogyoród	various motives from the works of Herodotos (Solomon = Cyrus, Darius, Xerxes; "intriguer" Count Vid = Democedes, Atossa, Mardonius; "peace-loving" Count Ernyei = Croesus, Artabanus, Demaratus); Ladislaus' vision before the battle, desecration of Vid's corpse (medieval literary analogies through Justin and Petrus Comestor)
123	Solomon and his mother after the battle	The queen mother foretells the downfall of his son (Persai by Aeschylus, Ab urbe condita by Livy, Gesta Francorum)

=== Biblical phrases ===
Some narratives was written using well-known biblical stories. The description of the Battle of Kerlés in 1068 (102nd chapter) is full of biblical proverbs, for instance, "swords drunk by the blood" – unlike Horváth's claim, who regarded it a folk simile – is a quote from Is 34:5. According to Péter B. Kovács, the Siege of Belgrade in 1071 (105th chapter) is depicted as similar to the story David and Goliath in its motif set and lexicography. Regarding the incitement of Count Vid (110th chapter), who says to Solomon that "two sharp swords cannot be kept in the same scabbard" is a reference to the doctrine of the two swords (Luke 22:38). The description of the Battle of Mogyoród (121st chapter), in addition to the aforementioned classical antique impacts, also contains biblical elements; "cloud of thick darkness" and "ermine of purest white".

== Sources ==
=== Primary sources ===
- Bak, János M.; Veszprémy, László; Kersken, Norbert (2018). Chronica de gestis Hungarorum e codice picto saec. XIV [The Illuminated Chronicle: Chronicle of the deeds of the Hungarians from the fourteenth-century illuminated codex]. Budapest: Central European University Press. ISBN 978-9-6338-6264-3.

=== Secondary studies ===
- B. Kovács, Péter (2020). "A Gesta Ladislai regis néhány bibliai eredetű hasonlatáról [Biblical Metaphors in the Gesta Ladislai regis]". Századok (in Hungarian). 154 (5). Magyar Történelmi Társulat: 1083–1104. ISSN 0039-8098.
- Bak, János M.; Grzesik, Ryszard (2018). "The Text of the Illuminated Chronicle". In Bak, János M.; Veszprémy, László (eds.). Studies on the Illuminated Chronicle. CEU Press. pp. 5–23. ISBN 978-963-386-261-2.
- Bollók, János (1998). "Die Gesta regis Ladislai [The Deeds of King Ladislaus]". Acta Universitatis de Attila József Nominatae: Acta antiqua et archaeologica (in German). 27. Szeged, Hungary: University of Szeged: 223–229. ISSN 0567-7246.
- Gerics, József; Ladányi, Erzsébet (1996). "Gesta és legenda a krónikában: gesta Ladislai regis [Gesta and Legend in the Chronicle: Gesta Ladislai regis]". Magyar Könyvszemle (in Hungarian). 112 (3): 273–282. ISSN 0025-0171.
- Horváth, Jr., János (1954). Árpád-kori latinnyelvű irodalmunk stílusproblémái [Stylistic Problems of the Árpád-Era Latin Literature] (in Hungarian). Budapest: Hungarian Academy of Sciences.
- Klaniczay, Tibor (1964). "Egy 11. századi joculator-eposz? [An 11th-Century Joculator Epic Poem?]". In Klaniczay, Tibor (ed.). A magyar irodalom története I. kötet: A magyar irodalom története 1600-ig (in Hungarian). Hungarian Academy of Sciences. pp. 30–32. ISBN 963-05-2302-7.
- Mályusz, Elemér (1967). A Thuróczy-krónika és forrásai [The Thuróczy Chronicle and its Sources] (in Hungarian). Budapest: Tudománytörténeti tanulmányok 5, Hungarian Academy of Sciences.
- Négyesy, László (1913). "Árpádkori compositio [Composition from the Era of Árpáds]". Budapesti Szemle (in Hungarian). 41 (154): 188–201.
- Szőcs, Tibor (2007). "A 14. századi krónikaszerkesztmény interpolációi és 11. századi okleveleink [Interpolations of the 14th-Century Chronicle Compilation and the 11th-Century Charters]". Fons. 14 (1). Szentpétery Imre Történettudományi Alapítvány: 59–96. ISSN 1217-8020.
- Veszprémy, László (2019). Történetírás és történetírók az Árpád-kori Magyarországon (XI–XIII. század közepe) [History Writing and Historians in Hungary during the Reign of the Árpád Dynasty (Eleventh–Mid Thirteenth Century] (in Hungarian). Line Design. ISBN 978-963-480-004-0.
