= 1074 =

1074 in various calendars
- Gregorian calendar: 1074; MLXXIV
- Ab urbe condita: 1827
- Armenian calendar: 523; ԹՎ ՇԻԳ
- Assyrian calendar: 5824
- Balinese saka calendar: 995–996
- Bengali calendar: 480–481
- Berber calendar: 2024
- English Regnal year: 8 Will. 1 – 9 Will. 1
- Buddhist calendar: 1618
- Burmese calendar: 436
- Byzantine calendar: 6582–6583
- Chinese calendar: 癸丑年 (Water Ox); 3771 or 3564 — to — 甲寅年 (Wood Tiger); 3772 or 3565
- Coptic calendar: 790–791
- Discordian calendar: 2240
- Ethiopian calendar: 1066–1067
- Hebrew calendar: 4834–4835
- Hindu calendars
- Vikram Samvat: 1130–1131
- Shaka Samvat: 995–996
- Kali Yuga: 4174–4175
- Holocene calendar: 11074
- Igbo calendar: 74–75
- Iranian calendar: 452–453
- Islamic calendar: 466–467
- Japanese calendar: Enkyū 6 / Jōhō 1 (承保元年)
- Javanese calendar: 978–979
- Julian calendar: 1074; MLXXIV
- Korean calendar: 3407
- Minguo calendar: 838 before ROC 民前838年
- Nanakshahi calendar: −394
- Seleucid era: 1385/1386 AG
- Thai solar calendar: 1616–1617
- Tibetan calendar: ཆུ་མོ་གླང་ལོ་ (female Water-Ox); 1200 or 819 or 47 — to — ཤིང་ཕོ་སྟག་ལོ་ (male Wood-Tiger); 1201 or 820 or 48

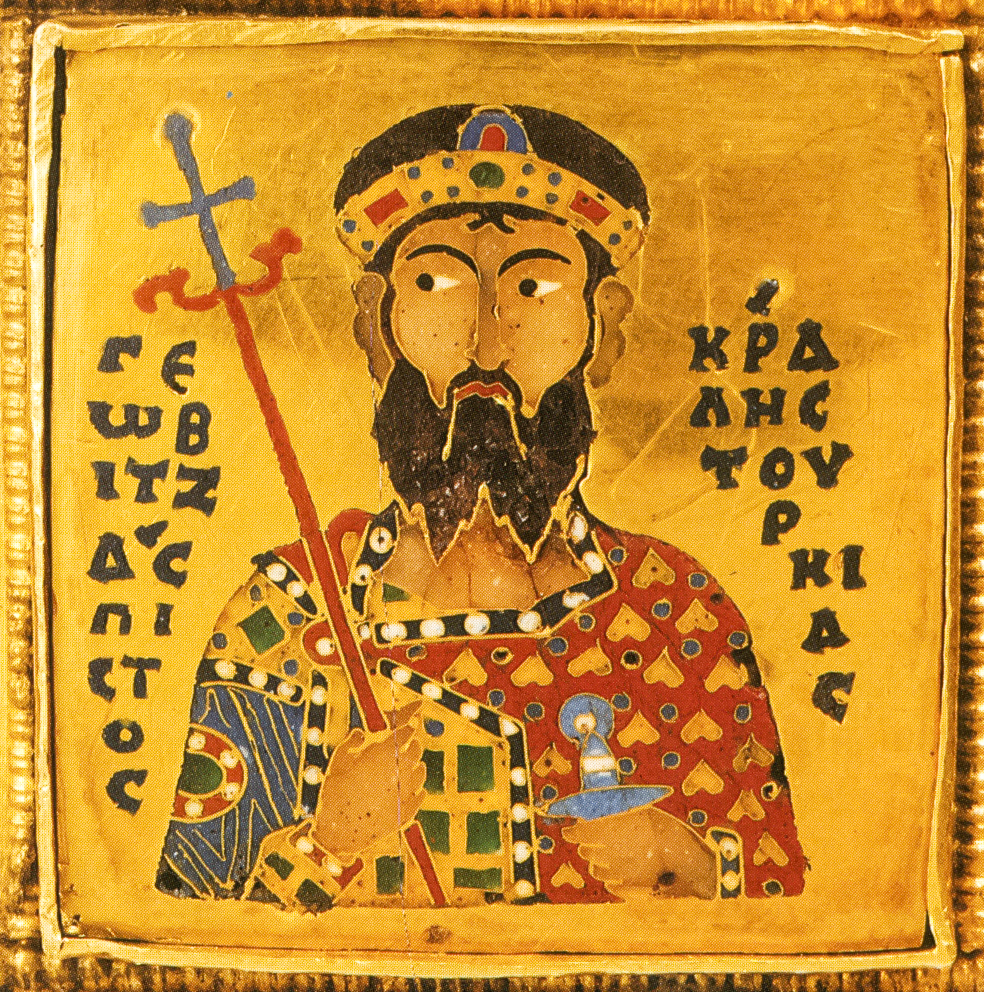
King Géza I of Hungary (c. 1040–1077)

Year 1074 (MLXXIV) was a common year starting on Wednesday of the Julian calendar.

== Events ==
=== By place ===
==== Byzantine Empire ====
- Spring – Norman mercenaries, led by Roussel de Bailleul, proclaim John Doukas emperor of the Byzantine Empire. His nephew, Emperor Michael VII Doukas, forms an alliance with Seljuk chieftain Suleiman ibn Qutulmish, who is raiding in the eastern regions of Anatolia. The Seljuk Turks ambush the Norman forces; Roussel and John are defeated and captured; but a ransom, raised by Roussel's wife, allows him to return to Amaseia.

==== Europe ====
- February 2 – Treaty of Gerstungen: King Henry IV is forced to restore the peace with Duke Otto of Nordheim (one of the Saxon leaders of the Saxon Rebellion). He signs a treaty in Gerstungen Castle, on the River Werra in Thuringia (modern Germany).
- February 7 – Battle of Montesarchio: Prince Pandulf IV, co-ruler of Benevento, is killed while fighting the Normans in southern Italy.
- February 26 – Battle of Kemej: King Solomon, King of Hungary routs the army of his cousin Duke Géza with the assistance of German troops.
- March 14 – Battle of Mogyoród: King Solomon is defeated by his cousins, Duke Géza I and Ladislaus I. He is dethroned and Géza becomes the new ruler of Hungary.
- October 21 – The Belgium beer brand Affligem is founded.

==== Africa ====
- Spring – Badr al-Jamali becomes Chief Wazir (Grand Vizier) and effectively military dictator of the Fatimid Caliphate under Caliph Al-Mustansir Billah in Egypt.

==== China ====
- Emperor Shenzong of Song establishes a Marine Office and a Goods Control Bureau north-west of Shanghai, allowing for the loading and unloading of freight.

=== By topic ===
==== Religion ====
- Pope Gregory VII temporarily excommunicates the Norman nobleman Robert Guiscard.

== Births ==
- February 12 – Conrad II of Italy, king of Germany (d. 1101)
- April – Abu Mansur Mauhub al-Jawaliqi, Arab philologist (d. 1144)
- September 16 – Al-Musta'li, Fatimid caliph (d. 1101)
- Ibn al-Tilmidh, Syriac physician and poet (d. 1165)
- Approximate date
  - Edgar ("the Valliant"), king of Scotland (d. 1107)
  - Hugh I, count of Champagne
  - Maud, Countess of Huntingdon, queen consort of Scotland (d. 1130)

== Deaths ==
- February 7 – Pandulf IV of Benevento, Lombard prince
- March 14
  - Ernyei, Hungarian lord and courtier
  - Vid Gutkeled, Hungarian lord and courtier (b. c. 1010)
- April 25 – Herman I, margrave of Baden
- May 6 – Dúnán (or Donat(us)), 1st bishop of Dublin
- October 25 – Shōshi, empress of Japan (b. 988)
- Ibn al-Wafid, Andalusian pharmacologist
- Joseph Tarchaneiotes, Byzantine general
- Peter Krešimir IV, king of Croatia (or 1075)
- Ralph IV of Valois (or Raoul), French nobleman
- Wugunai, Chinese chieftain (b. 1021)
- Yang Wenguang, Chinese general
