= Vid Gutkeled =

11th-century Hungarian nobleman

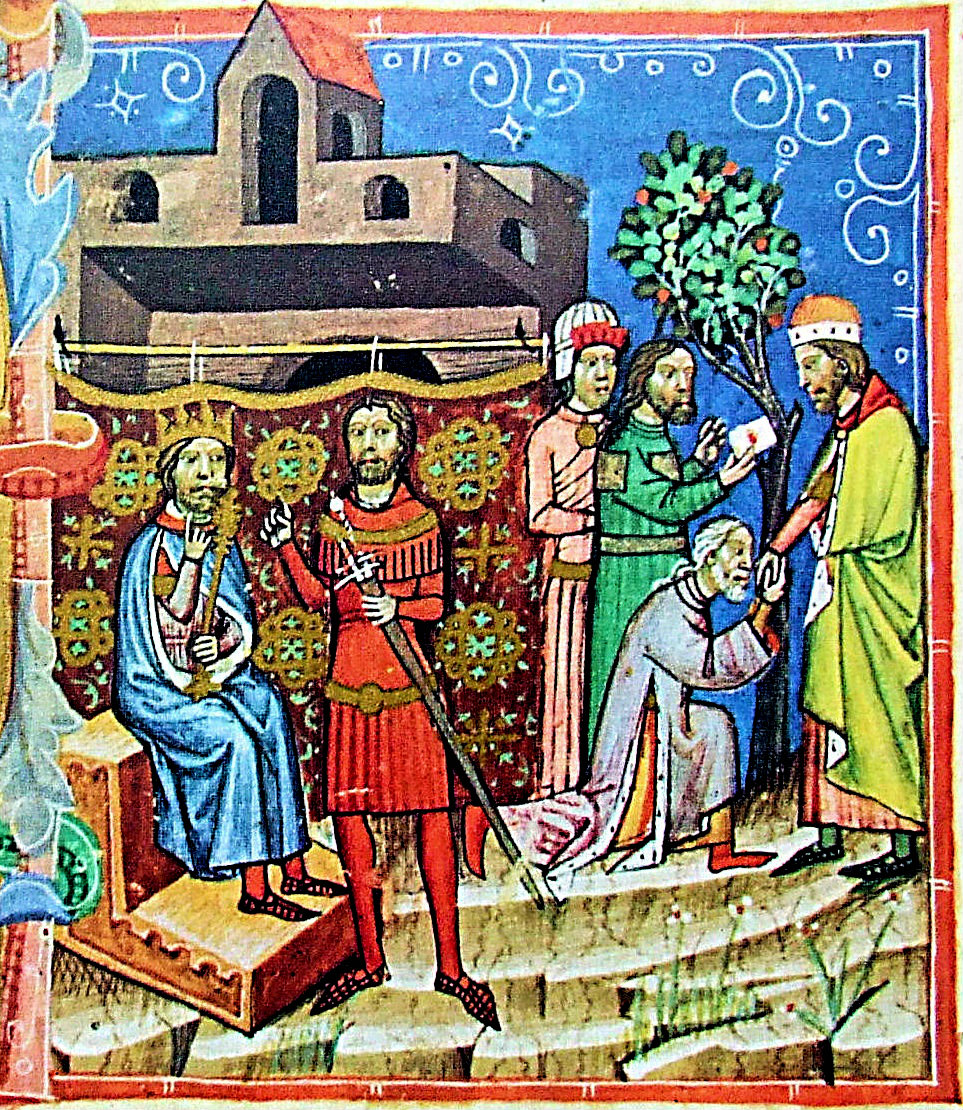
- Count Vid (dressed in red) incites King Solomon against Duke Géza, depicted in the Illuminated Chronicle

Ispán of Bács
- Reign: 1071–1074
- Predecessor: first known
- Successor: Cletus (?)
- Born: c. 1010; Duchy of Swabia
- Died: 14 March 1074; Battle of Mogyoród
- Noble family: gens Gutkeled
- Issue: a daughter

Vid from the kindred Gutkeled (Hungarian: Gutkeled nembeli Vid), colloquially also known as Count Vid (Hungarian: Vid ispán; c. 1010 – 14 March 1074), was an 11th-century Swabian-born Hungarian lord and courtier, an early member of the illustrious gens (clan) Gutkeled. As a chief advisor of Solomon, King of Hungary, he played a significant role in the deterioration of relations with the king's cousins, dukes Géza and Ladislaus, which led to internal conflicts and Solomon's deposition. Later chronicles, including the Illuminated Chronicle depicts Vid as an evil and malicious advisor.

== Ancestry ==
In the times of King Solomon and Dukes Ladislas and Géza the kindred of Gut-Keled was highly respected. The kindred then divided into two parts, some holding to the dukes, and some to Solomon and especially to Vid, whom Solomon is said to have raised in honor above the rest of the kindred.

— Illuminated Chronicle

Vid (also Wyd or Vitus) originated from the illustrious gens (clan) Gutkeled, who arrived from the Duchy of Swabia to the Kingdom of Hungary during the second reign of Peter Orseolo (r. 1038–1041, 1044–1046). In Swabia, their residence was "the castle of Stauf", which could be either Burg Staufen near Freiburg im Breisgau, or Hohenstaufen in Württemberg, both were ancient seats of the Hohenstaufen dynasty. The 14th-century Illuminated Chronicle adds that this kindred "descended from the leading men of Swabia; they were poor in lands, yet men of honor and power in their country", implying that the first Gutkeleds were immigrant knights who were younger sons of families of good standing, but with little inheritance.

Since Vid's son-in-law Ilia was already adult by the mid-1050s, it is plausible that Vid was born around 1010 and he was among those German imperial knights who entered Hungary in 1044 to assist Peter's return to the Hungarian throne. The Hungarian chronicler Simon of Kéza writes that "three brothers of the Keled and Gut kindred came to Hungary". It is plausible that Vid was the brother of Gut (Guth) and Keled (Cletus), eponymous ancestors of the clan, but his name was omitted since he had no male offspring or because of his subsequent bad reputation in the chronicle text. Genealogist János Karácsonyi expressed his doubt about Vid's affiliation to the Gutkeled clan. He argued the mid-13th century historian Ákos – who interpolated the Hungarian chronicle text – unfoundedly claimed that Vid originated from that clan only for the fact that the aforementioned kinship possessed landholdings in the same area centuries later, where Vid's lands laid. However, most of the historians accepted the narration of the Illuminated Chronicle. Elemér Mályusz argued it is possible that Vid was the father of Gut and Keled, both were ispáns at the turn of the 11th and 12th centuries. Because of their influence, they became eponymous ancestors of the Gutkeleds instead of the knights who arrived to Hungary in the 1040s.

== Early career ==
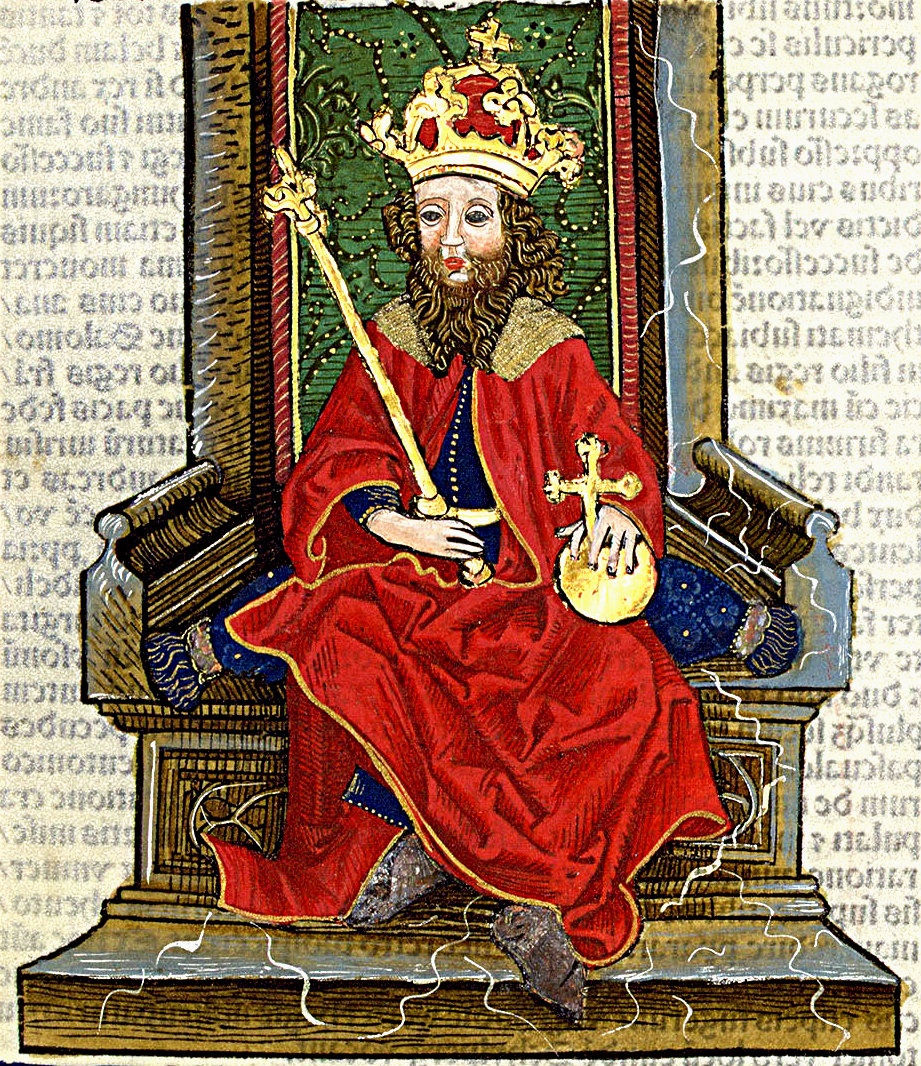
Solomon, King of Hungary, depicted by the Chronica Hungarorum

Despite Peter's fall from power in 1046 following a pagan uprising, Vid retained his influence in the royal court during the reign of Andrew I of Hungary. His name (Vitus) appears among the testimonies in the establishing charter of the abbey of Tihany in 1055, together with his future son-in-law Ilia and his future rival Ernyei. It is possible that Vid played an important role in the conclusion of peace between Hungary and the Holy Roman Empire in 1058, in order to strengthen Andrew's son, the child Solomon's claim to the Hungarian throne against his uncle Béla. After Béla rebelled against his brother Andrew and dethroned him in 1060, her widow Anastasia took her son Solomon, and together with their partisans – including Vid – fled to the Holy Roman Empire.

After the Germans invaded Hungary in the autumn of 1063, Béla I was dethroned and Solomon was installed as the new king of Hungary. Vid also returned to the kingdom and became a key proponent of a German–Hungarian alliance in the royal court. He viewed with suspicion the ambitions of the sons of the late Béla – Géza, Ladislaus and Lampert –, with whom Solomon had reconciled and shared his rule, granting the territory of "duchy" (i.e. one-third of the realm) to them in 1064. Vid elevated as the most influential royal advisor of the young Solomon in the 1060s. The name of Vid ("Wydus") appears as a testimony in the founding charter of the abbey of Százd (laid near present-day Tiszakeszi) around 1067, alongside King Solomon, dukes Géza and Ladislaus, Archbishop Desiderius, Palatine Rodowan, ispáns Ernyei, Ilia and others.

During his nearly three-decade career in Hungary, Vid was granted lands in the southern part of the kingdom along its border with the Byzantine Empire. He possessed Buziás in the march of Syrmia (future Syrmia County), where he erected a manor. The Chronicon Posoniense refers to the estate as Buziáslak which the Gutkeled clan still possessed in the late 13th century. Historian Gyula Pauler identified the aforementioned landholding with Buziás (also called Fulbertfalva) in Valkó County. Dezső Csánki and György Györffy identified Buziás with Bežanija, present-day an urban neighborhood of Belgrade, Serbia. It is possible that Vid also possessed lands in northeastern Hungary (mostly in Szabolcs County), and present-day Tiszavid and Vitka (today a borough of Vásárosnamény) are named after him. In the area, he founded a Benedictine monastery, later called Vidmonostora (lit. "Vid's Monastery"), which laid near present-day Hajdúböszörmény. Its church, first mentioned in 1216, was dedicated to the Holy Cross.

== Solomon's counselor ==
For Vid ruled the ruler as a master his disciple, and against any law the king [Solomon] was as if subject to him by law, which all men should avoid, but kings in particular. The king was duped by the evil counsel of the treacherous Vid and set his army in movement against the duke [Géza].

— Illuminated Chronicle

By 1071, Vid elevated into the position of ispán of Bács County, which laid in the southern borderland along the Byzantine Empire. He is the first known holder of the office. In this capacity, Vid played an eminent role in the 1071–1072 war between the Kingdom of Hungary and the Byzantine Empire. The conflict began in the spring of 1071, when Pechenegs crossed Sava and plundered the fields of Buziás in Syrmia, including Vid's estate, taking many prisoners and spoils of war. This attack provided the reason for Solomon and the dukes to launch a campaign against the Byzantines, whom they considered the instigators of the Pechenegs' raid. The Hungarian army crossed the river Sava and laid siege to the Byzantine fortress Belgrade (Nándorfehérvár). While the royal army initially waited, Vid and his detachment from Bács County, consisted of castle warriors, began the siege. The Illuminated Chronicle narrates that the Byzantine garrison sought assistance from the Pechenegs, who, "misled by these deceitful words, the Pechenegs hastened to their help, and in their greed for the booty which they hoped to gain from the defeat of ispán Vid they threw themselves upon the ranks of the men from Sopron, whose commander was the ispán called Ian". His troops decisively defeated the Pecheneges at the walls of Belgrade. The siege lasted three months and the Hungarians finally captured the fort. It is possible that the Hungarians besieged and captured the fort Sirmium during the 1071 campaign too.

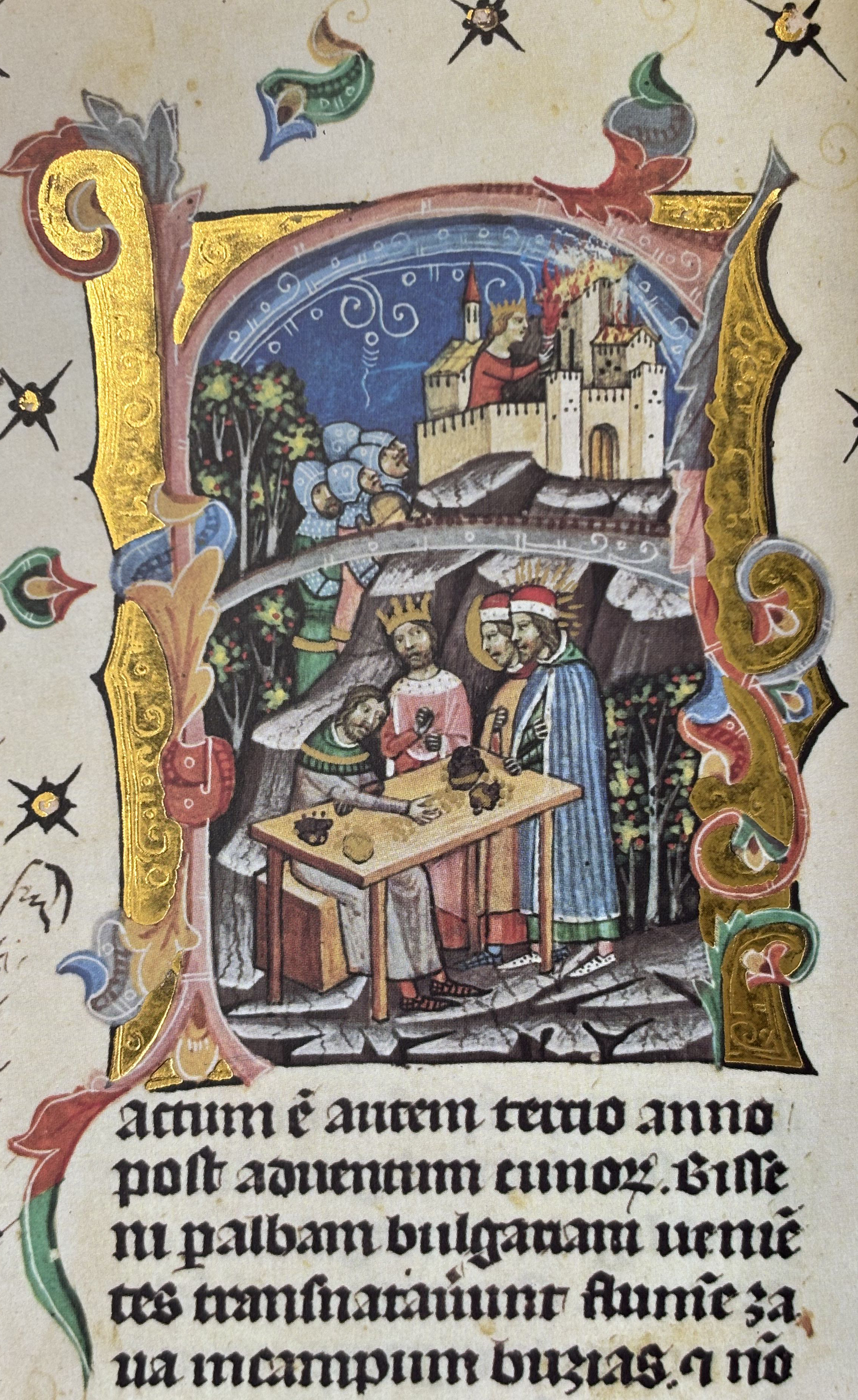
The distribution of spoils of war after the successful siege of Belgrade in 1071; Vid sits at a table and divides the booty into four parts, as depicted in the Illuminated Chronicle

Although the 1071 campaign was victorious for the Hungarians, its success was overshadowed by the emerging conflict between Solomon and Géza. Niketas, the Byzantine commander of Belgrade, together with his soldiers decided to surrender before Géza. The Illuminated Chronicle writes that "but there came only few to give themselves into the hands of King Solomon, for they knew that he was a tough man and that in all things he listened to the vile counsels of ispán Vid, who was detestable in the eyes both of God and men". Solomon "resented that very much", as the chronicle says. Although the aforementioned work clearly identified Vid as the instigator of the internal war – thus, several scholars, including Bálint Hóman saw the moral failings of Solomon and Vid behind the roots of the conflict –, but historian Ferenc Makk argued that Géza insulted the royal majesty with his act, when he agreed that the defenders would surrender before him and thereby he exceeded his authority. The relationship between Solomon and Géza deteriorated further caused by the division of the war-booty took place in Vid's estate in Buziás. There, the king – on the counsel of Vid, Bishop Franco, Rodowan and Ilia, Vid's son-in-law – granted only a quarter of the booty to Géza, who claimed its third part. In accordance with Solomon's decision, both Vid and Ilia were each granted a quarter of all the spoils of war, in addition to the fourth quarter belonging to the king himself and all soldiers. Géza was greatly annoyed by this act. Dániel Bagi argued Solomon put his soldiers in his cousin's place with the intention that Géza and all his soldiers share these spoils equally, thus the monarch effectively demoted Géza to the rank of a common soldier. Thereafter the duke negotiated with the Byzantine envoys and set all the Byzantine captives – including Niketas – free without the king's consent. Géza entered into negotiations with the Byzantine emperor and his representatives, excluding the king, behind his back, in order to conclude a peace treaty between them, which was achieved. Faced with this situation, Solomon was forced to acknowledge that the duke and the basileus had concluded an agreement through their envoys, bypassing his authority.

Thereafter, the conflict was further sharpened by Count Vid; the Illuminated Chronicle narrates how the ispán incited the young monarch against his cousin by saying that as "two sharp swords cannot be kept in the same scabbard", so the king and the duke "cannot reign together in the same kingdom". Therefore, Vid urged the king repeatedly that he should banish Duke Géza and then take the vacant duchy (ducatus) from him. As the Illuminated Chronicle narrates, Vid's "poisonous words filled the king with hate and rancor", but he practiced dissimulation for tactical reasons, and in pretended friendship he sent the duke away to his duchy. As a result, Solomon and Géza jointly participated in the continuation of the campaign against the Byzantine Empire in 1072, but Géza's brother, Ladislaus remained with half of their troops in the Nyírség. After their return from the campaign, both Solomon and Géza began to make preparations for their inevitable conflict and were seeking assistance from abroad. In order to conclude a truce, Solomon sent his envoys, "Vid, detestable to God, and the gentle Ernyei" to the court of Géza, who – fearing Vid's treachery – guarded them carefully. While Solomon negotiated with three German dukes in order to assist the war against his enemy, Géza sent back Vid and Ernyei to the king and they concluded a truce, which was to last from 11 November 1073 until 24 April 1074.

Solomon spent Christmas 1073 at the fort Ikervár by the Rába River. Then he came to Zala County, where Markwart IV of Eppenstein, Duke of Carinthia entered the Hungarian border on behalf of King Henry IV of Germany. There, both Markwart and Vid urged Solomon to launch a military campaign against Géza. As the Illuminated Chronicle quotes, Vid suggested that "without a doubt you can now easily subdue the duke since he has none to help him, and if you put off attacking him until the expiry of the truce he will have a hope of escape". Géza sent his brothers Ladislaus and Lampert to seek assistance from Kievan Rus' and Poland respectively. After Ladislaus had returned from Rus' without help, Géza sent his brother to Bohemia to request military assistance from their brother-in-law Duke Otto I of Olomouc. At a meeting in the Szekszárd Abbey in late 1073 or early 1074, Count Vid again persuaded the king to break the truce in order to unexpectedly attack Géza who was "hunting in Igfan Forest" to the east of the river Tisza. Vid proposed capturing and blinding the duke, thus rendering him unfit to rule. Vid added that "this you can do because all his counselors are faithful to you. And you shall give me the duchy, and thus you will strengthen your crown". This was a novel and bold idea, because the dignity of territorial power had previously only been held by the scions of the royal Árpád dynasty. Vid's plan expressed the ambition of the most influential part of the emerging feudal baronial elite. With this step, Vid hoped to "ascend to the level of a dynastic ruler". Although William, the abbot of the monastery, which had been established by Géza's father, warned the duke of the king's plans, the royal army crossed the river and routed Géza's troops in the battle of Kemej on 26 February 1074.

== Last incitement and death ==
I [Ladislaus] mourn your [Vid's] death, although you were always an enemy to us; I would that you had lived and had changed, and had established peace between us. But I wonder that you, not being of ducal blood, should have wanted a duchy, and that you should have desired a crown when you were not of a [proper] lineage. Now I see that the heart which aspired to a duchy is pierced with a lance, and the head which desired a crown is cleft with a sword.

— Illuminated Chronicle

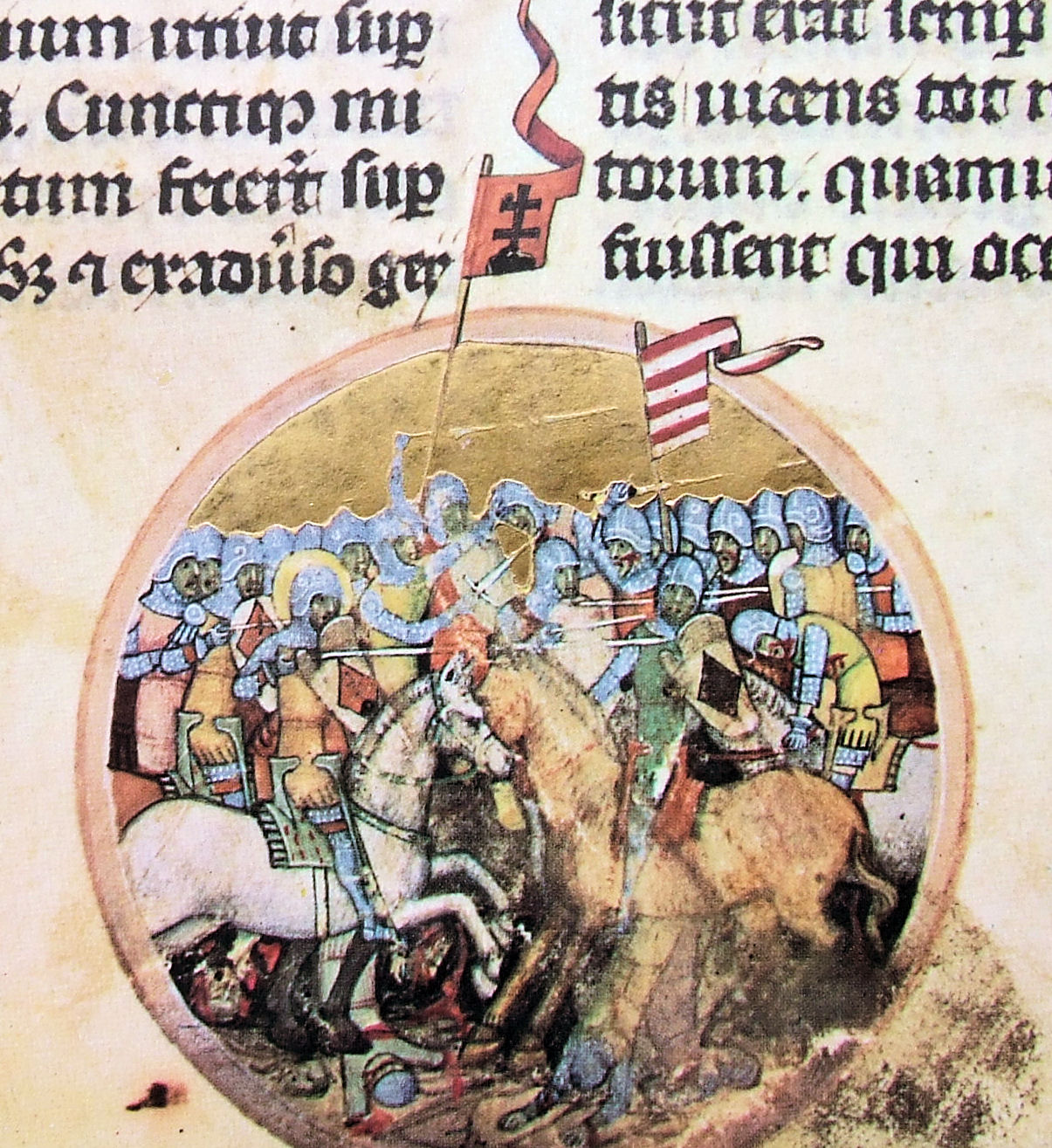
The Battle of Mogyoród in 1074, as depicted in the Illuminated Chronicle

From the battlefield, Géza and his retinue hastened towards Vác where he came upon his brother Ladislaus and their brother-in-law Duke Otto, who, accompanied by Czech reinforcements, arrived in Hungary in order to assist Géza against Solomon. At the same time, the king's army crossed the frozen Tisza at Kotojd (near Péteri), where Gurcu sheltered Solomon and his entourage in his manor. There, Solomon learned that Géza had formed an alliance with Otto against him. Vid urged the decisive battle to be fought belittling the fighting value of Géza's army and vowed that "if my comrades agree, I and the people of Bács will afflict the peril of early death to the Bohemian army". In contrast, the peace-seeker Ernyei burst into tears, protesting against the fratricidal war, and warned Vid that "you say that the duke has assembled men with scythes and men with pitchforks. Behold, what a thousand scythes can cut down, ten thousand pitchforks cannot gather up, and only God may know their number". However, Solomon put trust in Vid's words and hastened forward with his army reaching the field of Rákos.

The two armies met at the foot of the mountain near Mogyoród. The following days were full of active reconnaissance work on both sides. Count Vid remained optimistic: "As soon as they see our army, they will flee". But dukes Géza and Ladislaus also drew up their lines of battle at the earliest dawn. Seeing this, Ernyei warned his rival that "I think rather that they have resolved to win or die". The decisive battle at Mogyoród took place on 14 March 1074. The Bohemian auxiliary troops routed Vid's detachment, consisted of castle warriors from Bács County, in the first moments of the skirmish. Géza and his allies won a decisive victory and forced Solomon to flee from the battlefield and to withdraw to Moson at the western frontier of Hungary. Both Vid and Ernyei were killed in the battlefield. Despite his intrigues, Ladislaus ordered a proper burial for Vid when he saw his corpse. However, the dukes' warriors, enraged by the fact that many Hungarian soldiers had perished as a result of Vid's intrigues, "forthwith dismounted from their horses and with their knives cut open his breast, and put out his eyes and filled the sockets with earth, and said: »Your eyes could never look their fill on riches and rank, but now your eyes and breast shall have their fill of earth«".

== Legacy ==
Vid was the first Hungarian magnate, who claimed supreme power despite not belonging to the ruling dynasty, and thus became the forerunner of the powerful and influential lords of the 13th century. Outside Vata, the leader of the pagan uprising in 1046, Vid was also the first non-royal nobleman, who influenced the direction of Hungarian history. Through his role as a councilor (the medieval social institutions of consilium and imitatio imperii), his aspirations and ambitions can be compared to his Central European counterparts, such as Miecław and Sieciech in Poland, and the clan of Vršovci in Bohemia. However, the exclusivity of the royal dynasties was unquestionable in the 11th century, so these aspirations proved short-lived, unlike in later eras.

The 14th-century Illuminated Chronicle, of which earliest text variant was written and expanded under the reigns of Géza's descendants, portrays Count Vid as an evil, malicious and vile advisor of the royal court. Accordingly, his "malign influence" caused the conflict between Solomon and his cousins. The medieval chronicles emphasize that his worst crime was laying claim to power even though he was not of royal or ducal stock. Because of his bad reputation, the Gutkeleds omitted his person as an eponymous ancestor of their illustrious clan in the subsequent centuries.

== Sources ==
=== Primary sources ===
- Simon of Kéza: The Deeds of the Hungarians (Edited and translated by László Veszprémy and Frank Schaer with a study by Jenő Szűcs) (1999). CEU Press. ISBN 963-9116-31-9.
- Bak, János M.; Veszprémy, László; Kersken, Norbert (2018). Chronica de gestis Hungarorum e codice picto saec. XIV [The Illuminated Chronicle: Chronicle of the deeds of the Hungarians from the fourteenth-century illuminated codex]. Budapest: Central European University Press. ISBN 978-9-6338-6264-3.

=== Secondary studies ===
- Bagi, Dániel (2020). Divisio Regni. The territorial divisions, power struggles, and dynastic historiography of the Árpáds of 11th- and early 12th-century Hungary, with comparative studies of the Piasts of Poland and the Přemyslids of Bohemia. Arpadiana II., Research Centre for the Humanities. ISBN 978-963-416-206-3.
- Báling, Péter (2021). Az Árpád-ház hatalmi kapcsolatrendszerei. Rokonok, barátok és dinasztikus konfliktust Kelet-Közép-Európában a 11. században és a 12. század elején [The Power Relations of the Árpád Dynasty. Relatives, Friends and Dynastic Conflict in East-Central Europe in the 11th Century and Early 12th Century] (in Hungarian). Arpadiana VII., Research Centre for the Humanities. ISBN 978-963-416-246-9.
- Karácsonyi, János (1900). A magyar nemzetségek a XIV. század közepéig. [The Hungarian genera until the middle of the 14th century] (in Hungarian). Hungarian Academy of Sciences.
- Makk, Ferenc (1987). "Megjegyzések Salamon és I. Géza történetéhez [Remarks to the History of Solomon and Géza I]". Acta Universitatis Szegediensis. Acta Historica (in Hungarian). 84. MTA-SZTE-MOL Magyar Medievisztikai Kutatócsoport: 31–44. ISSN 0324-6965.
- Makk, Ferenc (1994). "Vid". In Kristó, Gyula; Engel, Pál; Makk, Ferenc (eds.). Korai magyar történeti lexikon (9–14. század) [Encyclopedia of the Early Hungarian History (9th–14th centuries)] (in Hungarian). Akadémiai Kiadó. p. 729. ISBN 963-05-6722-9.
- Mályusz, Elemér (1971). Az V. István-kori geszta [The Gesta of the Age of Stephen V]. Akadémiai Kiadó.
- Szabados, György (2003). "Vid ispán [Count Vid]". In Szentpéteri, József (ed.). Szürke eminenciások a magyar történelemben (in Hungarian). Kossuth Kiadó. pp. 6–7. ISBN 963-09-4499-5.
- Szőcs, Tibor (2007). "A 14. századi krónikaszerkesztmény interpolációi és 11. századi okleveleink [Interpolations of the 14th-Century Chronicle Compilation and the 11th-Century Charters]". Fons. 14 (1). Szentpétery Imre Történettudományi Alapítvány: 59–96. ISSN 1217-8020.
- Tóth, Endre (2021). "Szent Vid hegye és temploma [The Mountain and Church of Saint Vitus]". Vasi Szemle (in Hungarian). 75 (4): 440–449. ISSN 0505-0332.
- Zsoldos, Attila (2011). Magyarország világi archontológiája, 1000–1301 [Secular Archontology of Hungary, 1000–1301] (in Hungarian). História, MTA Történettudományi Intézete. ISBN 978-963-9627-38-3.

Vid Genus Gutkeled Born: ? Died: 14 March 1074
Political offices
Preceded by first known	Ispán of Bács; 1071–1074	Succeeded by Cletus (?)
