= Gurka =

Gurka may refer to:

- Gurka (card game), a north European card game
- Gurkha, a native of Nepal
- Gurka or Gurcu, a Hungarian nobleman
