= Battle of Kemej =

Battle in 1074 in Hungary

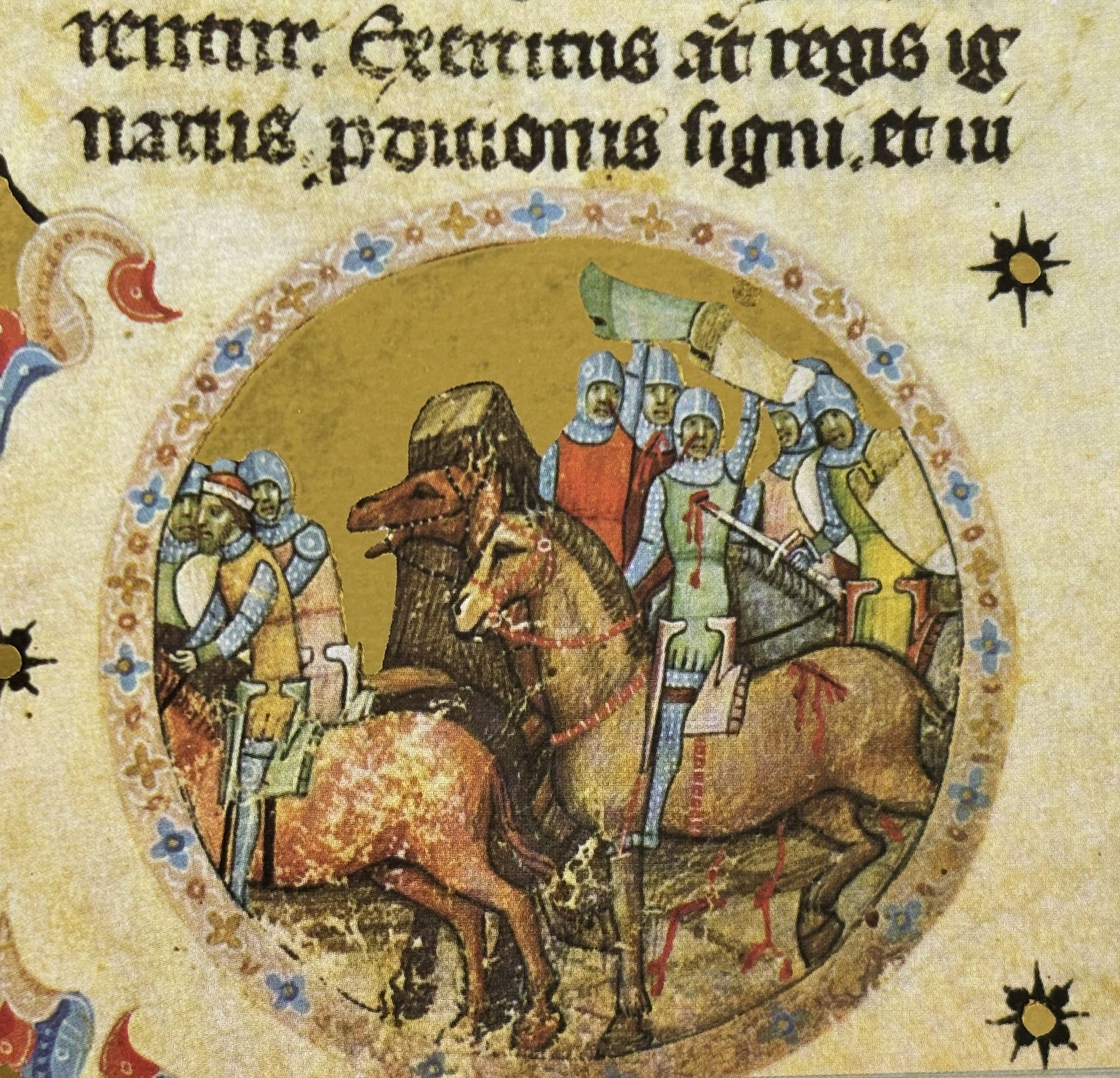
- The fleeing of Géza, as depicted in the 14th-century Illuminated Chronicle
Date	26 February 1074
Location	Kemej, Kingdom of Hungary
Result	King Solomon's victory

Belligerents
Kingdom of Hungary; Supported by: Holy Roman Empire	Géza's duchy

Commanders and leaders
King Solomon; Duke Markwart; Vid Gutkeled; Petrud †; Bikács †	Duke Géza; Petrud (AWOL); Bikács (AWOL); Szolnok

Strength
30+3 county columns	4 (1) county columns (three of them defected)

Casualties and losses
Light (three joining columns were perished by friendly fire)	Almost all

The Battle of Kemej (Hungarian: kemeji csata) was an internal conflict between Solomon, King of Hungary and his cousin Duke Géza, took place on 26 February 1074 near Kemej in present-day Heves County. As a result of a betrayal, Géza was defeated, but he managed to flee from the advancing and overwhelming royal army.

== Background ==
Solomon ascended the Hungarian throne with the assistance of the Holy Roman Empire in 1063. Solomon and his cousins – Géza, Ladislaus and Lampert – eventually reached an agreement: Géza and his brothers acknowledged Solomon as lawful king, and Solomon granted them their father's one-time ducatus. The king and his cousins closely cooperated in the period between 1064 and 1071. Their relationship became tense during the 1071–1072 campaign against the Byzantine Empire, when the garrison of Belgrade surrendered before Géza, neglecting the Hungarian monarch, while a division of the war-booty also caused a dispute between them.

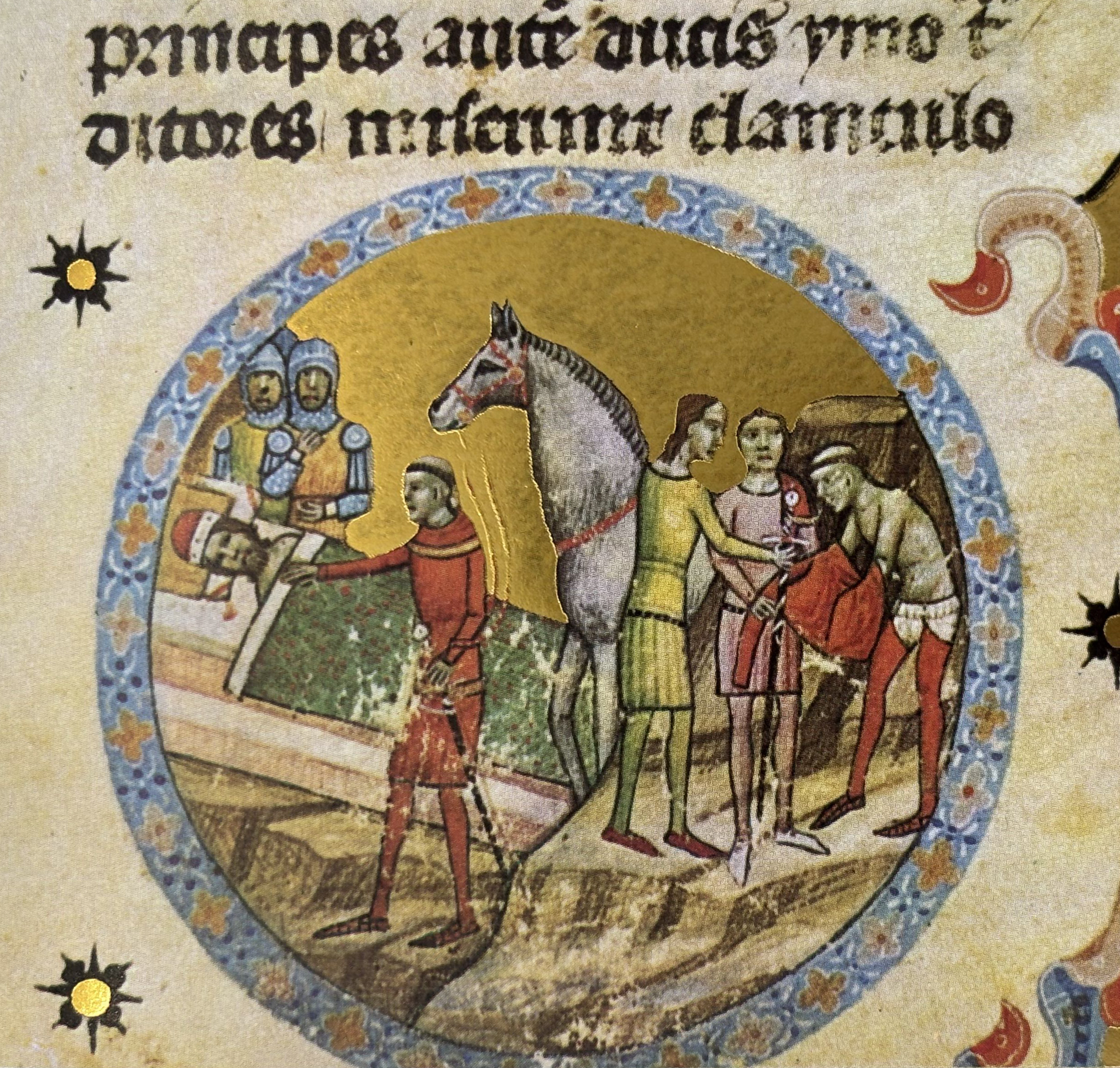
Abbot William, dressed in knightly robes, wakes Géza up and warns him of the danger, in the presence of the two later traitors, Petrud and Bikács, as depicted in the Illuminated Chronicle

In the following years, their relationship remained strained, not least due to the intrigues of Solomon's advisor, Count Vid. Although the parties concluded a truce, which was to last from 11 November 1073 until 24 April 1074, but both Solomon and Géza prepared for a war and sought military assistance from abroad. Solomon spent Christmas 1073 at the fort Ikervár by the Rába River. Then he came to Zala County, where Markwart IV of Eppenstein, Duke of Carinthia entered the Hungarian border on behalf of King Henry IV of Germany. There, both Markwart and Vid urged Solomon to launch a military campaign against Géza. Meanwhile, the duke sent his brothers Ladislaus and Lampert to seek assistance from Kievan Rus' and Poland respectively.

At a meeting in the Szekszárd Abbey in late 1073 or early 1074, Count Vid again persuaded the king to break the truce in order to unexpectedly attack Géza who was "hunting in Igfan Forest" to the east of the river Tisza, at the border of Hungary and Transylvania in Bihar County (present-day Munţii Plopişului). The abbot William, concealed in a hidden room, listened while they took counsel. He immediately sent a messenger to the duke with letters warning him, but Géza's advisors – ispáns Petrud, Szolnok and Bikács –, who secretly served Solomon, convinced the duke that the abbot had sent the envoy to him in his drunkenness. Géza believed them and remained in Igfan, but he also sent Ladislaus to Bohemia to request military assistance from their brother-in-law Duke Otto I of Olomouc. After Solomon accepted Vid's counsel, William – who was loyal to Géza, because the monastery of Szekszárd was erected by his father Béla I – left the abbey in disguise and hurried to Duke Géza, whom he woke up and warned of the danger. Géza, having gathered his army, wished to proceed as quickly as possible to Bohemia, but the arriving royal army blocked his path.

== The battle ==
As the traitor Judas gave a sign, so the fleeing traitors, as they had arranged with the king, raised their shields as a sign that the king's soldiers should not attack them. But the king's men did not know about this sign of betrayal, and seeing the duke's detachments in flight, they pursued them to their destruction, so that very few of those traitors escaped death; and would that not one of those had escaped who foully betrayed their lord and benefactor.

— Illuminated Chronicle

The two armies met at Kemej on the left bank of the river Tisza on 26 February 1074. The district Kemej laid in the eastern part of Heves County, its territory covered the overwhelming part of later Nagykunság or "Greater Cumania". The name Kemej was preserved as one of the archdeaconries of the Diocese of Eger until the mid-14th century. Gyula Pauler argued that the Kemej region extended from Tiszafüred to the Zagyva River, and in the east it bordered the Hortobágy region. Solomon, who marched from Tolna County to the eastern part of the country, most likely gathered almost the entire army, mainly from the Transdanubian territories (columns from altogether thirty counties and castle districts), in addition to the Carinthian auxiliary troops led by Duke Markwart. In contrast, Géza only had four columns, presumably from the counties of the Tiszántúl region of his duchy – perhaps Szatmár, Szabolcs, Borsova and Szolnok counties, considering the fact that Ladislaus gathered the ducal army in Upper Hungary, whom Géza tried to join. However, Solomon's army caught up with them near Nagyiván. Based on these figures, Gyula Pauler considered that Hungary consisted of 45 counties, and thus that the ducatus was made up to 15, during that time, in accordance with the two-thirds-one-third split ("tercia pars regni").

Immediately after the arrival of the royal army, Géza's advisors secretly sent messengers to the king to say that if the king would confirm them in their dignities, they would desert Géza and swear loyalty to Solomon. The king agreed to this and the royal army crossed Tisza. Near the battlefield, Solomon put on his armor and set up the battle line at Nagyfiaegyháza ("ecclesiam filii Nog", lit. "church of the son of Nagy"), laid near to Karcag. Right before the clash, Petrud and Bikács, together with their three columns, consisted of castle warriors, defected to Solomon. The Illuminated Chronicle narrates that "Duke Géza, although deserted by the greatest part of his army, was not afraid to give most furious battle with his one detachment against Solomon's thirty". The king's significant superior force, however, defeated Géza's army. With the attack, Solomon violated the truce and the institution called Peace and Truce of God, because the skirmish took place during Lent. The traitors, Petrud and Bikács, together with their three columns fled the battlefield raised their shields as a sign that the king's soldiers should not attack them. But Solomon's army, not knowing this sign, pursued them to their destruction, so that very few of those traitors escaped death. The Illuminated Chronicle depicts the violent death of the two traitorous ispáns. After the majority of his soldiers fell, Géza also fled with few men.

Solomon's famous soldier, Opos the Brave also participated in the battle. The Illuminated Chronicle narrates that Opos "overcame in single combat a most valiant warrior of the duke whose name was Peter". In battle, he so actively killed the enemy with his sword that he earned the admiration of Solomon and the Germans.

== Aftermath ==
The fleeing Géza crossed Tisza at Kotojd. Although some historians – e.g. György Györffy and Jenő Szűcs – identified this place with Tokaj, that would have been quite a large detour to the north, so it is likely that the location refers to the Kota stream near Egyek or the ferry of present-day Tiszadorogma. Géza, while he was rapidly moving towards Vác to join his brothers, he sent his chaplain George the Black ahead to Ladislaus and his secretary, the cleric Ivánka to Lampert with the news of his defeat. Arriving in Vác, his brothers and brother-in-law, Otto, were already waiting for him and gathered the duchy's army.

The king's army crossed the frozen Tisza at Kotojd too, then Gurcu (son of the aforementioned Peter) was forced to shelter Solomon and his entourage in his manor in the nearby Péteri. There, Solomon was informed that Géza had concluded an alliance with the Bohemians. In the following weeks, both parties prepared for a decisive battle. This finally took place on 14 March 1074, near Mogyoród, where Géza and his brothers won a crushing victory and deprived Solomon of his throne.

== Sources ==
=== Primary sources ===
- Bak, János M.; Veszprémy, László; Kersken, Norbert (2018). Chronica de gestis Hungarorum e codice picto saec. XIV [The Illuminated Chronicle: Chronicle of the deeds of the Hungarians from the fourteenth-century illuminated codex]. Budapest: Central European University Press. ISBN 978-9-6338-6264-3.

=== Secondary sources ===
- Bagi, Dániel (2020). Divisio Regni. The territorial divisions, power struggles, and dynastic historiography of the Árpáds of 11th- and early 12th-century Hungary, with comparative studies of the Piasts of Poland and the Přemyslids of Bohemia. Arpadiana II., Research Centre for the Humanities. ISBN 978-963-416-206-3.
- Györffy, György (1987). Az Árpád-kori Magyarország történeti földrajza, III: Heves, Hont, Hunyad, Keve, Kolozs, Komárom, Krassó, Kraszna, Küküllő megye és Kunság [Historical Geography of Hungary of the Árpáds, Volume III: The Counties of Heves, Hont, Hunyad, Keve, Kolozs, Komárom, Krassó, Kraszna, Küküllő and Cumania] (in Hungarian). Akadémiai Kiadó. ISBN 963-05-3613-7.
- Pauler, Gyula (1899). A magyar nemzet története az Árpád-házi királyok alatt, I. [The History of the Hungarian Nation during the Árpádian Kings, Vol. 1.] (in Hungarian). Athenaeum.
- Zsoldos, Attila (1995). "Péter és Gurka (Gurcu) ispán nemzetsége [The "Clan" of Peter and Gurka]". Történelmi Szemle (in Hungarian). 37 (3). Hungarian Academy of Sciences: 345–351. ISSN 0040-9634.
