= Battle of Kerlés =

Engagement between Pechenegs and Ouzes in 1068

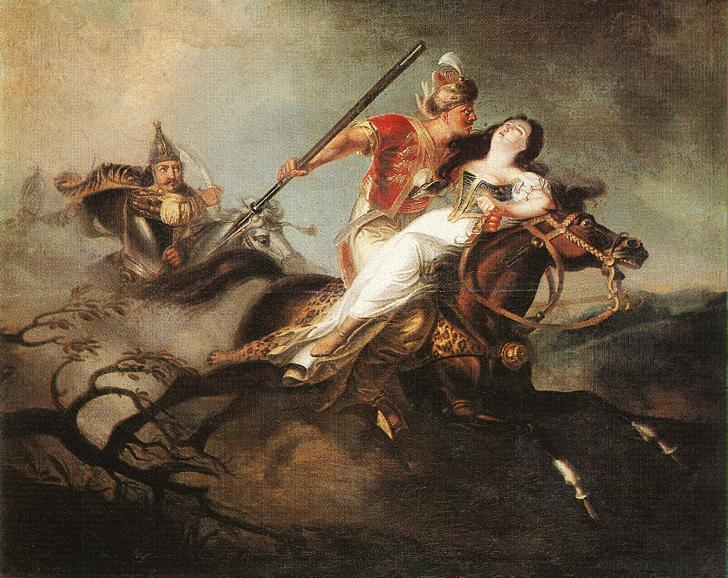
- Duke Ladislaus (left) at the Battle of Kerlés
Date	1068
Location	Near Kerlés, Kingdom of Hungary (today Chiraleș, Romania)
Result	Hungarian victory

Belligerents
Kingdom of Hungary	Pechenegs (and Ouzes)

Commanders and leaders
King Solomon; Duke Géza; Duke Ladislaus	Osul

Strength
Unknown	Unknown

The Battle of Kerlés (Hungarian: kerlési csata) also known as the Battle of Cserhalom (Hungarian: cserhalmi csata), was an engagement between an army of Pechenegs and Ouzes commanded by Osul (Note: Medieval chronicles wrote that the invaders were Cumans or Pechenegs, or Cumans and Vlachs (or Romanians). Modern historians identify the invaders as Pechenegs, or Pechenegs and Ouzes.) and the troops of King Solomon of Hungary and his cousins, Dukes Géza and Ladislaus, in Transylvania in 1068. The Pechenegs had been the dominant power of the westernmost regions of the Eurasian steppes since around 895. However, large Pecheneg groups moved to the Balkan Peninsula at the same time as the westward migration of the Ouzes and Cumans in the 1040s. The first recorded Pecheneg invasion of Transylvania occurred during the reign of Stephen I of Hungary (r. 997–1038).

In 1068, the invaders broke into Transylvania through the passes of the Carpathian Mountains. Archaeological finds suggest that they destroyed at least three fortresses made of earth and timber, including the ones at Doboka (now Dăbâca in Romania) and Sajósárvár (present-day Șirioara). They also made a plundering raid in the Nyírség region, to the west of Transylvania. After taking much booty, they planned to leave Hungary, but the Hungarians ambushed and annihilated them at a hill near Doboka. According to a popular legend, a "Cuman" warrior tried to escape from the battlefield, taking a Hungarian girl, but Duke Ladislaus defeated and killed him in single combat.

== Background ==
The Pechenegs were the dominant power of the Pontic steppes between around 895 and 1055. Around 895, they defeated the Magyars, or Hungarians, forcing them to leave the steppes and settle in Central Europe. About 45 years later, the Byzantine Emperor Constantine VII Porphyrogenitus recorded that one of the Pecheneg "provinces" – the territory dominated by one of the eight Pecheneg tribes – bordered on the land controlled by the Hungarians. According to the same source, the Pechenegs' land was "distant ... a four days journey" from Hungary. There are no records of enmity between the Pechenegs and the Hungarians in the 10th century. On the contrary, they jointly invaded the Byzantine Empire in 934, according to the contemporaneous Arab geographer, Al-Masudi.

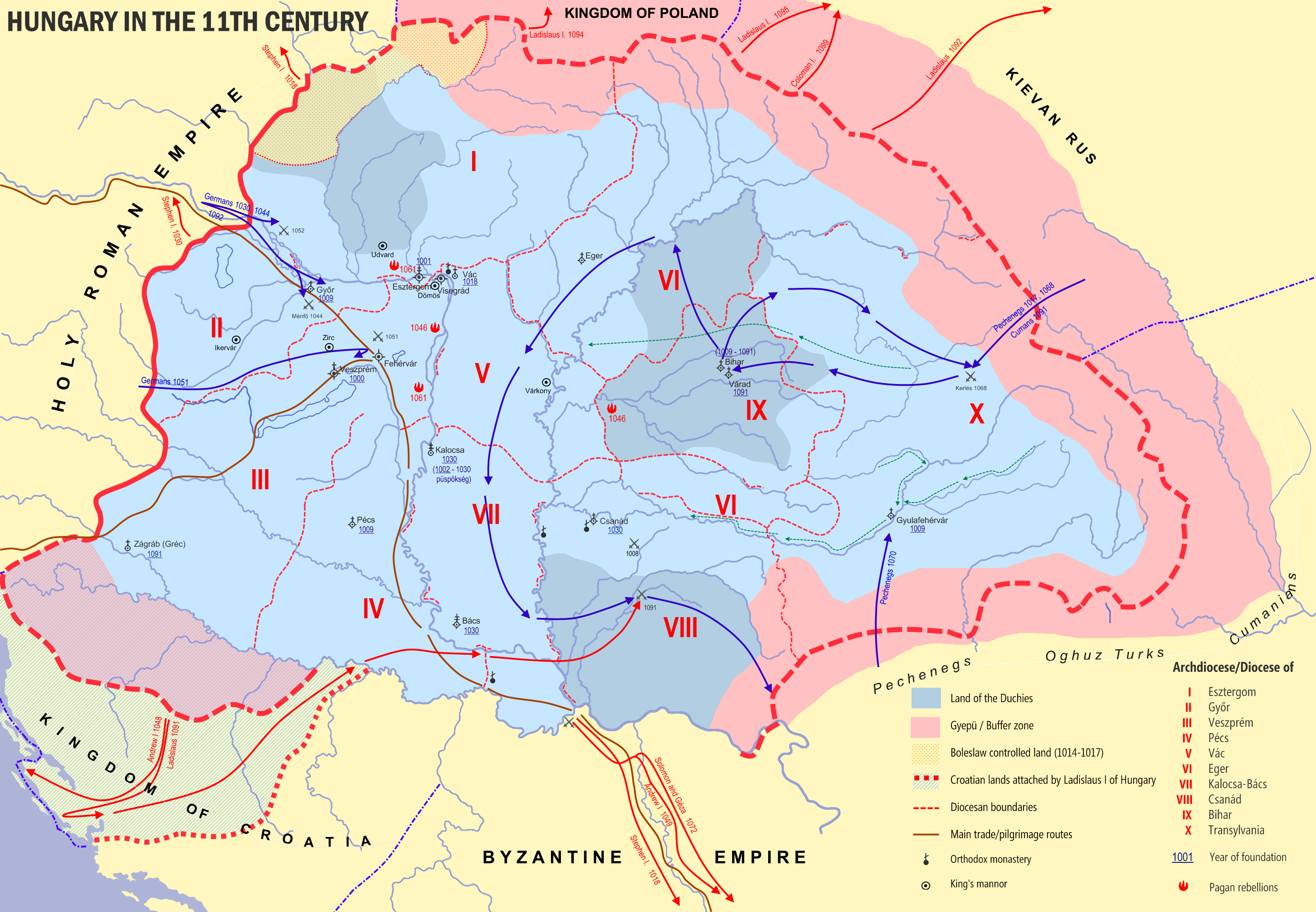
Kingdom of Hungary in the 11th century (also showing the 1068 invasion and the battlefield)

The Pechenegs regularly invaded the Byzantine Empire from around 1026, suggesting a movement west from the lands east of the Dnieper to the region of the Lower Danube. The Byzantine historians John Skylitzes and George Kedrenos mention clashes between the Pechenegs and their eastern neighbors, the Ouzes in the 1040s. The Ouzes had been forced west across the Volga River by the Cumans. Skylitzes and Kedrenos also wrote of armed conflicts between groups of Pechenegs. After being defeated in such an intertribal conflict, two Pecheneg clans migrated to the Byzantine Empire in the early 1040s. Pressured by both the Cumans and the Rus' princes, the Ouzes moved to the Lower Danube region in 1060. The Cumans routed a Rus' force in 1061 and the united armies of the allied Rus' princes in 1068, which enabled them to take control of the western regions of the Eurasian steppes.

Hungary was exposed to raids by the neighboring nomadic peoples. Coins minted for King Stephen and his successor, Peter, have been found at Torda and Kolozsvár (now Turda and Cluj-Napoca in Romania), and other places, showing that the nearby fortresses were in use in the first half of the 11th century. The Pechenegs made a plundering raid into Transylvania during the reign of King Stephen, according to the king's legends. The chronicle of Henry of Mügeln records the raid as occurring in 1028. Abbot Thierry of St Hubert-en-Ardenne, who wanted to travel through Hungary during his pilgrimage to the Holy Land in 1053, was forced to return because of an "incursion of barbarians" into Hungary. Historian Jonathan Riley-Smith associates these barbarians with the Pechenegs.

The invasion of the Kingdom of Hungary which ended with the Battle of Kerlés occurred during the reign of King Solomon of Hungary. Solomon had ascended the throne with German assistance at the age of ten in 1063. His cousins, Géza, Ladislaus and Lampert, tried to dethrone him with Polish assistance, but he made peace with them, granting Géza their father's duchy which included the parts of Hungary to the east of the River Tisza. Duke Géza's main residence was in the fortress of Bihar (now Biharia in Romania).

== Battle ==
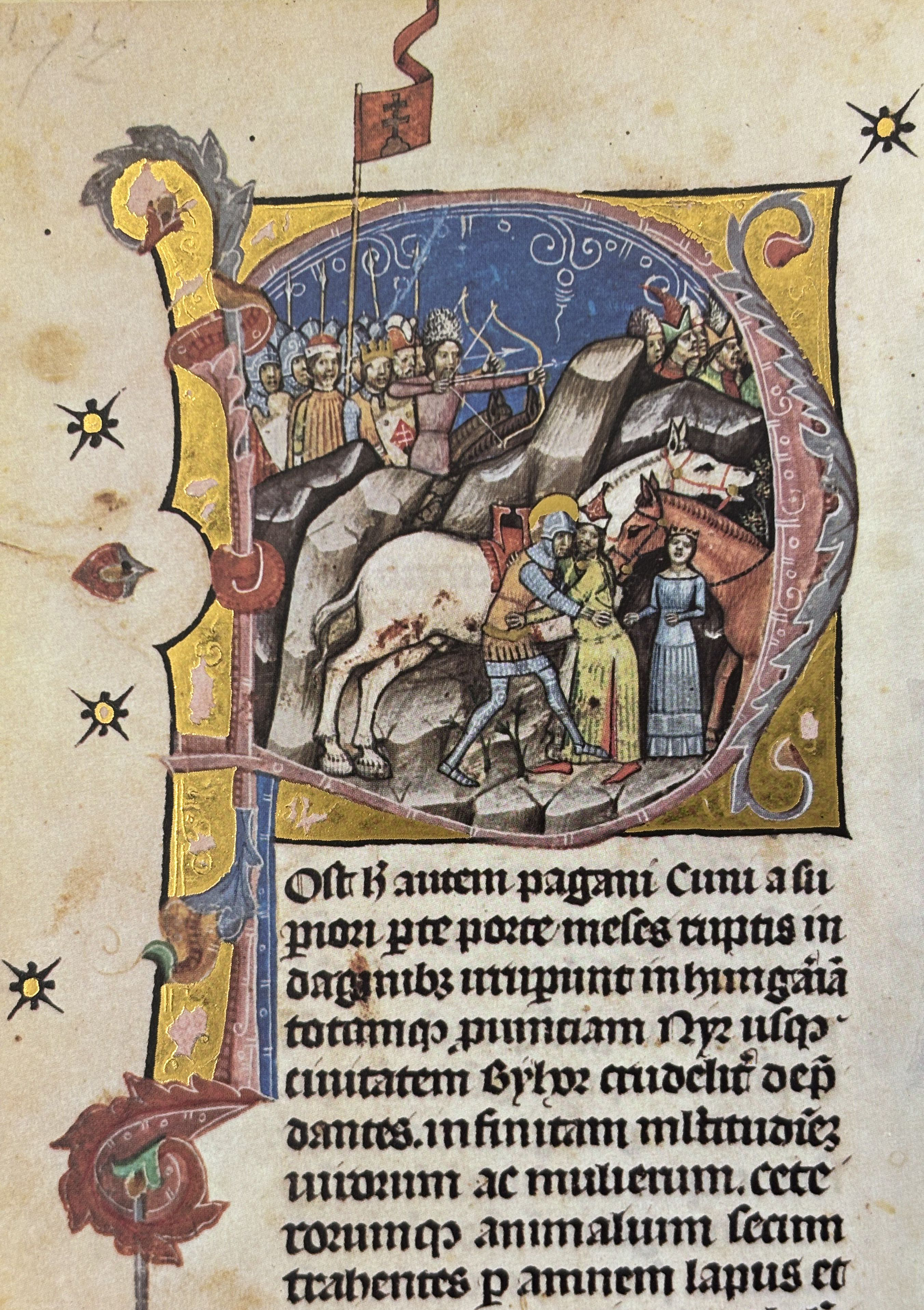
Saint Ladislaus is fighting a duel with a Cuman warrior (Chronicon Pictum, 1358)

The Illuminated Chronicle and other 14th- and 15th-century Hungarian chronicles preserve detailed reports of the 1068 invasion of the eastern regions of Hungary. The Illuminated Chronicle states that the commander of the invaders, Osul, was the retainer of "Gyula, Duke of the Comans". On the other hand, Simon of Kéza – who thought that the battle had occurred during the reign of Solomon's cousin, Ladislaus – recorded that the marauders were Bessi, or Pechenegs, arch-enemies of the Hungarians in his Gesta Hunnorum et Hungarorum. The Annales Posonienses also states that the marauders were Pechenegs, but misdates the battle to 1071. The invasion was misdated to 1059 in a west-Russian chronicle which identified the invaders as Cumans and Vlachs (Romanians). Modern historians agree that the invaders of 1068 were Pechenegs or Pechenegs and Ouzes; in medieval Hungarian chronicles the ethnonym Cuni included all nomadic Turkic peoples. Historian István Bóna writes that the reference to "Gyula, Duke of the Comans" in the Illuminated Chronicle preserved the memory of the Pechenegs' Jula tribe who dwelt to the west of the River Dniester.

A layer of black soil and other signs of a general destruction by fire, which have been dated to King Solomon's reign, suggest that the fortresses, built of earth and timber, at Doboka, Kolozsvár and Sajósárvár were destroyed in the 1060s. Alexandru Madgearu, István Bóna and other scholars attribute the destruction of the Transylvanian fortresses to the invasion of 1068. The invaders broke into Transylvania through the passes of the Carpathian Mountains. According to historian Florin Curta, the invasion shows that the province prospered in the 1060s.

The Pechenegs crossed the "Gate of Meses" and plundered the Nyírség region, reaching as far as the fortress at Bihar. After plundering much booty, they returned to Transylvania along the valley of the River Someș, planning to return to their homeland through the Borgó Pass (the Tihuța Pass, now in Romania). King Solomon and his cousins, Dukes Géza and Ladislaus, gathered their troops at the fortress of Doboka to give battle to the marauders near the confluence of the Rivers Beszterce and Sajó (now the Bistrița and the Șieu, respectively). A scout from Marosújvár (now Ocna Mureș in Romania) informed the Hungarian army of the movements of the enemy. In an attempt to avoid the battle, the Pechenegs fled to a hill where the Hungarians annihilated them. The hill was named for the Hungarians' battle cry – Kyrie eleis, according to Bóna. The alternative name of the battle (Battle of Cserhalom) derives from the misspelling of the name by Antonio Bonfini, who wrote of "Cherhelem" instead of "Kyrie eleis".

== Legend ==
The most famous legend of Duke Ladislaus – who was canonized as King St Ladislaus – took place during the Battle of Kerlés. According to the legend, which incorporates elements of earlier Oriental tales, a "Cuman" warrior tried to escape from the battlefield, taking a beautiful girl from Nagyvárad with him. Duke Ladislaus fought a duel with the "Cuman", and despite being wounded he killed the "pagan". The legend was recorded shortly after Ladislaus's death, because it identified the girl as the daughter of the Bishop of Várad, and Ladislaus's successor, Coloman the Learned, prohibited the marriage of bishops. The legend was depicted on the walls of many churches in the Kingdom of Hungary, especially in the northern and southeastern territories (in present-day Slovakia and Romania).

== Sources ==
=== Primary sources ===
- Constantine Porphyrogenitus: De Administrando Imperio (Greek text edited by Gyula Moravcsik, English translation b Romillyi J. H. Jenkins) (1967). Dumbarton Oaks Center for Byzantine Studies. ISBN 0-88402-021-5.
- John Skylitzes: A Synopsis of Byzantine History, 811–1057 (Translated by John Wortley with Introductions by Jean-Claude Cheynet and Bernard Flusin and Notes by Jean-Claude Cheynet) (2010). Cambridge University Press. ISBN 978-0-521-76705-7.
- Simon of Kéza: The Deeds of the Hungarians (Edited and translated by László Veszprémy and Frank Schaer with a study by Jenő Szűcs) (1999). CEU Press. ISBN 963-9116-31-9.
- The Hungarian Illuminated Chronicle: Chronica de Gestis Hungarorum (Edited by Dezső Dercsényi) (1970). Corvina, Taplinger Publishing. ISBN 0-8008-4015-1.

=== Secondary sources ===
- Berend, Nora; Urbańczyk, Przemysław; Wiszewski, Przemysław (2013). Central Europe in the High Middle Ages: Bohemia, Hungary and Poland, c. 900-c. 1300. Cambridge University Press. ISBN 978-0-521-78156-5.
- Bóna, István (1994). "The Hungarian–Slav Period (895–1172)". In Köpeczi, Béla; Barta, Gábor; Bóna, István; Makkai, László; Szász, Zoltán; Borus, Judit (eds.). History of Transylvania. Akadémiai Kiadó. pp. 109–177. ISBN 963-05-6703-2.
- Madgearu, Alexandru (2005). The Romanians in the Anonymous Gesta Hungarorum: Truth and Fiction. Romanian Cultural Institute, Center for Transylvanian Studies. ISBN 973-7784-01-4.
- Curta, Florin (2006). Southeastern Europe in the Middle Ages, 500–1250. Cambridge University Press. ISBN 978-0-521-89452-4.
- Makk, Ferenc (1994). "kerlési csata [Battle of Kerlés]". In Kristó, Gyula; Engel, Pál; Makk, Ferenc (eds.). Korai magyar történeti lexikon (9–14. század) [Encyclopedia of the Early Hungarian History (9th–14th centuries)] (in Hungarian). Akadémiai Kiadó. p. 345. ISBN 963-05-6722-9.
- Makk, Ferenc; Thoroczkay, Gábor (2006). Írott források az 1050–1116 közötti magyar történelemről [=Written Sources of the Hungarian History between 1050 and 1116] (in Hungarian). Szegedi Középkorász Műhely. ISBN 978-963-482-794-8.
- Pálóczi Horváth, András (1989). Pechenegs, Cumans, Iasians: Steppe Peoples in Medieval Hungary. Corvina. ISBN 963-13-2740-X.
- Riley-Smith, Jonathan (1998). The First Crusaders, 1095–1131. Cambridge University Press. ISBN 0-521-64603-0.
- Spinei, Victor (2009). The Romanians and the Turkic Nomads North of the Danube Delta from the Tenth to the Mid-Thirteenth century. Koninklijke Brill NV. ISBN 978-90-04-17536-5.
- Szakács, Béla Zsolt (2006). "Between Chronicle and Legend: Image Cycles of St Ladislas in Fourteenth-Century Hungarian Manuscripts". In Kooper, Erik (ed.). The Medieval Chronicle IV. Rodopi B.V. pp. 149–176. ISBN 978-90-420-2088-7.
