= Ernyei =

11th-century Hungarian nobleman

- Died: 14 March 1074; Battle of Mogyoród
- Buried: Vác Cathedral
- Issue: Szella

Ernyei (died 14 March 1074) was an 11th-century Hungarian lord and courtier, who served as an advisor of Solomon, King of Hungary. The Illuminated Chronicle depicts Ernyei as a peace-seeking councilor during the king's conflict against his cousins, dukes Géza and Ladislaus.

== Early career ==
The name of Ernyei (also Ernye, Irnei, Erney or Herney) is the Hungarian variant of Irenaeus. Holding the title of ispán (or comes), he elevated into the royal council during the reign of Andrew I of Hungary. His name (Irnei) appears among the testimonies in the establishing charter of the abbey of Tihany in 1055, together with his future rival Vid Gutkeled. Ernyei retained influence in the court of King Solomon too. His name (Erney) appears as a testimony in the founding charter of the abbey of Százd (laid near present-day Tiszakeszi) around 1067, alongside King Solomon, dukes Géza and Ladislaus, and other officials.

Ernyei had a son Szella, who is referred to among the testimonies ("Szella filius Herney") by the last will and testament of miles Guden written around 1079.

== Solomon's "gentle" advisor ==
While Duke Ladislas went with groans among the bodies of the dead, seeing the body of ispán Ernyei; he immediately leapt down from his horse and embraced him, saying to him in tears: "Ispán Ernyei, lover of peace, I grieve over you as over my own brother, because your heart and your mind were full of peace". He lifted him up with his own hands and kissed him, and gave instructions to his warriors that they should give him honorable burial at Vác.

— Illuminated Chronicle

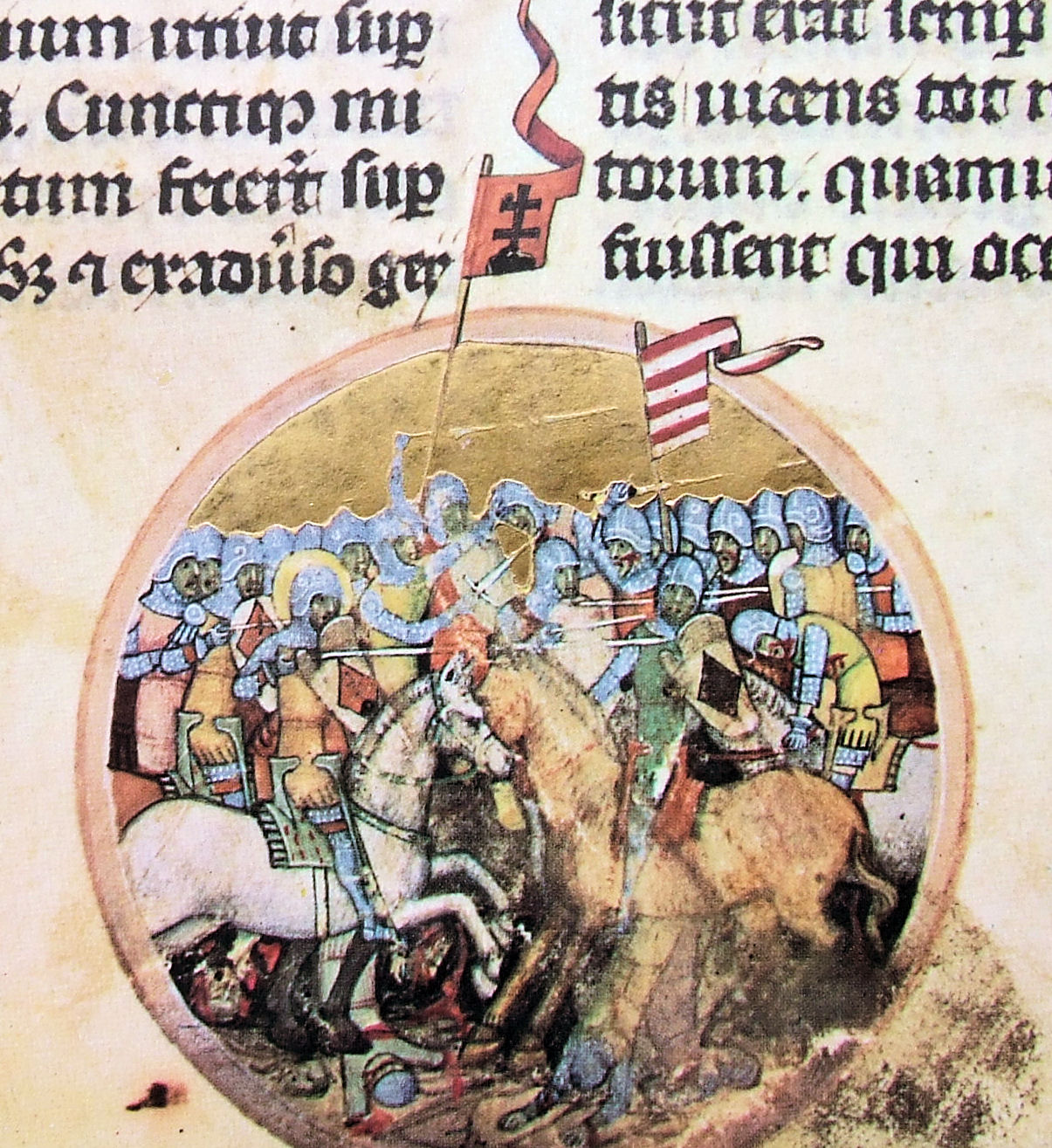
The Battle of Mogyoród in 1074, as depicted in the Illuminated Chronicle

When the tensions emerged in the relationship between Solomon and his cousin Géza in 1071, Ernyei appeared as a peace-seeking and "gentle" advisor, contrary to Vid, whose intrigues fueled the tension. In this capacity, he was a confidant of queen mother Anastasia of Kiev. In order to conclude a ceasefire, Solomon sent counts Vid and Ernyei to Duke Géza in the autumn of 1073. The duke, fearing Vid's treachery, caused that they be carefully guarded, while he also sent his envoys - Vata and an unidentified bishop of Várad – to the royal court. Géza released the envoys and they concluded a truce, which was to last from 11 November 1073 until 24 April 1074.

Thereafter, Solomon's German allies and Vid constantly urged the king to break the ceasefire and launch a military campaign against Géza. Following the victorious battle of Kemej on 26 February 1074, Solomon and his entourage stayed in Péteri. There, Vid urged the decisive battle to be fought belittling the fighting value of Géza's army, while Ernyei, the "lover of peace", burst into tears, protesting against the fratricidal war, and warned Vid that "you say that the duke has assembled men with scythes and men with pitchforks. Behold, what a thousand scythes can cut down, ten thousand pitchforks cannot gather up, and only God may know their number". However, despite Solomon's growing distrust, due to his outburst of emotion, Ernyei remained loyal to the king.

Solomon put trust in Vid's words and hastened forward with his army reaching the field of Rákos. The two armies met at the foot of the mountain near Mogyoród. The following days were full of active reconnaissance work on both sides. While Vid remained optimistic and predicted the enemy's fleeing, Ernyei proved to be much more pessimistic: "It would be a wonder if those armies fled before us, for they did turn their back to the Danube. I think rather that they have resolved to win or die". The decisive battle at Mogyoród took place on 14 March 1074. Géza and his allies won a decisive victory and forced Solomon to flee from the battlefield and to withdraw to Moson at the western frontier of Hungary. Both Vid and Ernyei were killed in the battlefield. When discovered his corpse, Duke Ladislaus mourned Ernyei's death, even though they were on opposite sides, and ordered his dignified and honorable burial.

== Sources ==
=== Primary sources ===
- Bak, János M.; Veszprémy, László; Kersken, Norbert (2018). Chronica de gestis Hungarorum e codice picto saec. XIV [The Illuminated Chronicle: Chronicle of the deeds of the Hungarians from the fourteenth-century illuminated codex]. Budapest: Central European University Press. ISBN 978-9-6338-6264-3.

=== Secondary studies ===
- Pauler, Gyula (1899). A magyar nemzet története az Árpád-házi királyok alatt, I. [The History of the Hungarian Nation during the Árpádian Kings, Vol. 1.] (in Hungarian). Athenaeum.
- Szőcs, Tibor (2007). "A 14. századi krónikaszerkesztmény interpolációi és 11. századi okleveleink [Interpolations of the 14th-Century Chronicle Compilation and the 11th-Century Charters]". Fons. 14 (1). Szentpétery Imre Történettudományi Alapítvány: 59–96. ISSN 1217-8020.
