= Gurcu =

Hungarian nobleman

Ispán of Esztergom
- Reign: 1079
- Predecessor: first known
- Successor: Simon (1156)
- Died: after 1079
- Noble family: gens Gurcu
- Father: Peter

Gurcu (Hungarian: Gurka) was a Hungarian nobleman in the second half of the 11th century. He is the first known ispán of Esztergom County.

== Biography ==
[...] In this conflict, Opos [...] overcame in single combat a most valiant warrior of the duke [Géza] whose name was Peter, and who on his chestnut charger rode out in front of the others, conspicuous in his shining breastplate and gilt helmet, challenging the warriors to combat. On his dun horse and in a hooded leather jerkin Opos charged forth alone from Solomon's ranks, and hurling himself upon Peter like a thunderbolt he shattered his breastplate with a blow of his lance and pierced him right through the heart. [...] Having gained the victory, the king crossed the frozen Tisza at Kotojd and took up lodging in the house of the son of Peter.

— Illuminated Chronicle

Gurcu was the son of Peter, a knight of Duke Géza, who claimed the Hungarian throne against his cousin King Solomon. Peter's lands in the eastern part of Pest County centered around Péteri, which was named after him. Several historians – e.g. Gyula Pauler, György Györffy, Elemér Mályusz, Gyula Kristó and Jenő Szűcs – claimed that this Peter is identical with Peter Aba, founder of the Százd Abbey. According to the Illuminated Chronicle, Peter was killed in a duel with the illustrious knight Opos the Brave in the Battle of Kemej on 26 February 1074, when Solomon's royal army routed Géza's troops. Thereafter, chasing Géza and his men, the royal army crossed the frozen Tisza at Kotojd and forced Peter's son Gurcu to shelter the soldiers in his manor at the nearby Péteri.

Eventually, Géza I was victorious at the decisive Battle of Mogyoród on 14 March 1074. Gurcu was styled as ispán of Esztergom County in 1079, which meant the peak of his career and his family's influence. He appears in this capacity in a single charter, the last will and testament of knight Guden. Prior to the 1090s, Gurcu donated a nearby estate (later called Apáti) to the Pannonhalma Abbey with the consent of Ladislaus I of Hungary.

== Descendants ==
The offspring of Peter and Gurcu still possessed lands around Péteri in the middle of the 13th century. They belonged to the local minor nobility. Oltumanus, son of Peter is referred to as "from the line of Count Gurcu" ("de genere Gurka comitis") by Béla IV in 1252, when the monarch granted a portion in Oszlár (today a borough of Sülysáp) in Pest County to Oltumanus for his participation in the 1250 war against the Duchy of Austria. In the upcoming decades, the kinship of Gurcu (also referred to as "nobiles de genere Petri") was involved in a lawsuit with the Dominican nuns of Rabbits' Island (later Margaret Island) over the estate Oszlár.

== Sources ==
=== Primary sources ===
- Bak, János M.; Veszprémy, László; Kersken, Norbert (2018). Chronica de gestis Hungarorum e codice picto saec. XIV [The Illuminated Chronicle: Chronicle of the deeds of the Hungarians from the fourteenth-century illuminated codex]. Budapest: Central European University Press. ISBN 978-9-6338-6264-3.

=== Secondary studies ===
- Zsoldos, Attila (1995). "Péter és Gurka (Gurcu) ispán nemzetsége [The "Clan" of Peter and Gurka]". Történelmi Szemle (in Hungarian). 37 (3). Hungarian Academy of Sciences: 345–351. ISSN 0040-9634.
- Zsoldos, Attila (2011). Magyarország világi archontológiája, 1000–1301 [Secular Archontology of Hungary, 1000–1301] (in Hungarian). História, MTA Történettudományi Intézete. ISBN 978-963-9627-38-3.
