= Saint Ladislaus legend =

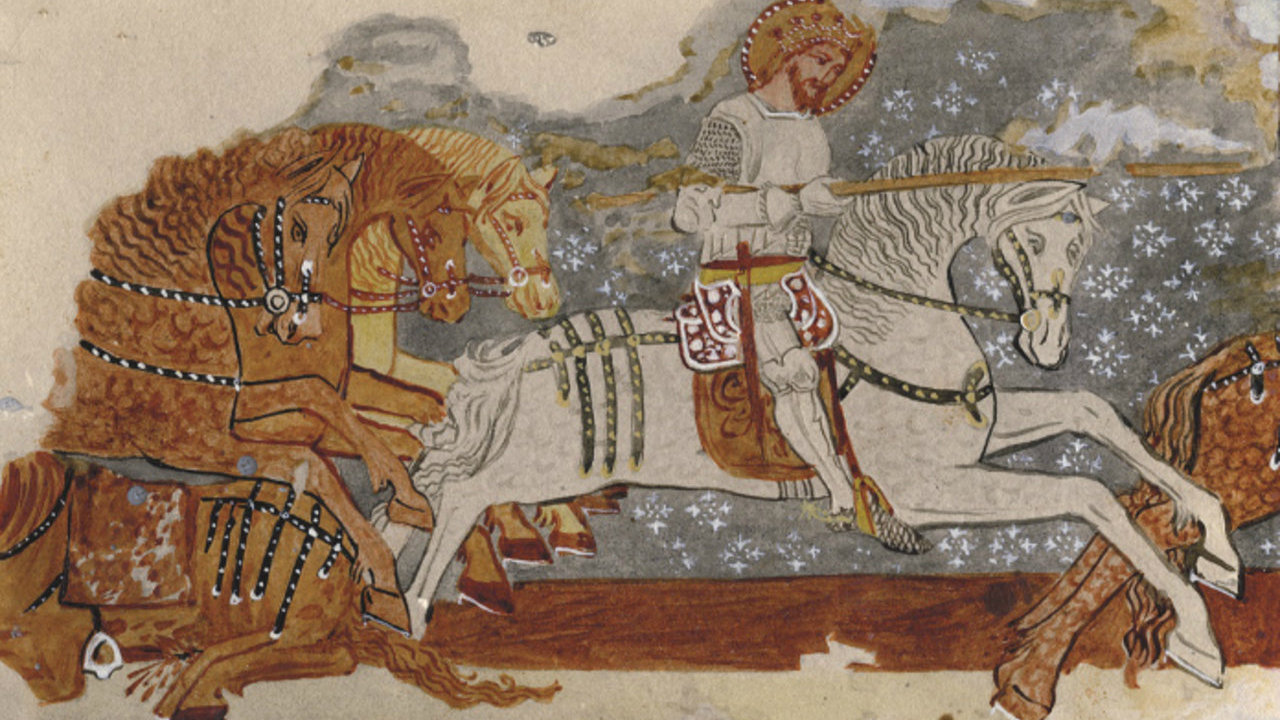
Mural in Dârjiu fortified church: The Saint Ladislaus legend, detail with the cavalier-king saint

An episode from the Legend of Saint Ladislaus provided the subjects for numerous murals painted in medieval churches in Hungary during the 14th to 16th century.

== Historical background ==
Ladislaus I of Hungary was a chivalrous king in Hungary in the 11th century. Before becoming the ruler, together with his brother Géza, and king Solomon of Hungary, he fought in Transylvania against armies of Pechenegs and Cumans invading from the steppes. In the story illustrated by the murals, at the Kerlés battlefield Ladislaus observed that a Pecheneg warrior was trying to abduct a Hungarian girl. The royal saint pursued and overcame the warrior and liberated the girl. The battle of the Christian king symbolizes the victory of Christianity over paganism. The legends of King Saint Ladislaus have been written about by chroniclers and depicted in various ways in the visual arts. Frescoes and paintings of the legend can be found on the walls of many medieval Hungarian churches.

== Sequence of the images in the Saint Ladislaus legend mural ==
The sequence of the events portrayed is generally similar all over the churches in medieval Hungary.

- Saint Ladislaus riding his horse in the battlefield catches sight of a pagan warrior holding a Hungarian girl in his saddle.
- Saint Ladislaus begins to pursue him.
- In the last metres before Saint Ladislaus could reach the pagan to stab him, he could not catch up to him
- Saint Ladislaus shouts to the girl: "Catch hold of the pagan at his belt and jump to the ground!"
- The girl does so, and the two warriors, the king and the pagan, begin wrestling.
- Saint Ladislaus can not subdue him, therefore the girl helps the king. She cuts the pagan's Achilles tendon.
- Saint Ladislaus beheads the pagan with the help of the girl.
- In the last scene the girl is resting in the arms of Saint Ladislaus.

== The Saint Ladislaus legend in the medieval churches of Hungary ==
Archaeologist Gyula László collected the documents of fifty churches all around the Carpathian basin, where mural had been painted in medieval churches in Hungary. Some of them had been demolished (for example the churches at Homoródszentmárton and Homoródokland), but some of them had been copied in 19th century sketches by József Huszka. These are preserved in the National Heritage Protection Office in Hungary.

Most of the murals were painted during the reigns of Charles I of Hungary, Louis I of Hungary, and Sigismund, Holy Roman Emperor. During their period of rule Saint Ladislaus became the ideal of the ruler kings therefore these kings chose their burying-place at the cathedral of Nagyvárad.

== Church murals, with main focus on Transylvania ==
Early 14th-century murals, all of Hungary

- Türje, Central Hungary, in 13th-century building
- Veľká Lomnica (Hung. Kakaslomnic), Slovakia, ordered by a noble family
- Laskod, Northern Hungary
- Mugeni (Hung. Bögöz), Transylvania, Romania (recently restored), ordered by a noble family

Group of cycles by same workshop, Transylvania, first half of the 14th century

- Ghelinţa (Hung. Gelence), ordered by a noble family; complete cycle discovered in 1882 by J. Huszka
- Crăciunel (Hung. Homoródkarácsonyfalva), newly discoveryed and almost intact cycle
- Mărtiniș (Hung. Homoródszentmárton), ordered by a noble family. Church demolished soon after Huszka discovered the murals and made copies of them.
- Pădureni (Hung. Sepsibesenyő), where copies by Huszka document the murals
- Saciova (Hung. Szacsva)

Group of cycles by various workshops, more provincial, Transylvania, second half and end of the 14th century

- Moacșa (Hung. Maksa), only known from copies and photos of Huszka
- Filia (Hung. Erdőfüle), only known from copies and photos of Huszka
- Pădureni (Hung. Sepsibesenyő), a second cycle, only known from copies and photos of Huszka
- Chilieni (Hung. Sepsikilyén), uncovered and restored
- Daia (Hung. Székelydálya), fragments of similar cycle in church not yet restored as of 2014
- Chichiş (Hung. Kökös, prev. in Háromszék County), only one scene found

Outside Transylvania, late 14th century

- Turnišče (Hung. Bántornya), Slovenia, painted by Johann Aquila in 1383, ordered by the Bánffy family

Workshop which created Székelyderzs/Dârjiu cycle

Active in both Szekler and Saxon villages of Transylvania, also creating other frescoes, such as the Calvary scene at Homorod (Ger. Hamruden, Hung. Homoród), the frescoes of Feliceni (Hung. Felsőboldogfalva), two faces reconstructed from fragments found among remains of the medieval church at Tomești (Hung. Csíkszenttamás), and traces of murals at Roadeș (Ger. Radenthal or Radeln).

- Dârjiu (Hung. Székelyderzs), painted in 1419 (dated by inscription), thus among the latest great cycles, ordered by Magister Paulus de Ung; from the same area as Homoródkarácsonyfalva/Crăciunel. Counted among the most famous cycles.
- Mihăileni (Hung. Csíkszentmihály), fragmentary
- Armășeni (Hung. Csíkmenaság), fragmentary

While it may be true that the cycle was particularly popular among the Szeklers, the latest findings indicate its popularity throughout Transylvania and all of medieval Hungary.

Other fragmentary cycle findings further west in Transylvania

- Cricău (Hung. Boroskrakkó, Ger. Krakau), 13th-century church near Alba Iulia/Gyulafehérvár
- Remetea (Hung. Magyarremete),

Cycles painted in Transylvanian Saxon churches

- Ațel (Ger. Hetzeldorf), where the cycle was originally on the outer wall of the church.
- Ighișu Nou (Ger. Sächsisch–Eibesdorf) newly discovered
- Șmig (Ger. Schmiegen, Hung. Somogyom) near Mediaș (Ger. Mediasch), beginning of the 15th century; discovered in 2017

The most intriguing questions still to be answered concern the origin of the fresco cycle, and when it first appeared in the Kingdom of Hungary. As of 2014, no examples securely dated to the late Arpadian period (i.e. before 1301) are known. Some recent discoveries of paintings on buildings dating back to the 13th century might push back the date.

In Transylvania, the Saint Ladislas cycle is sometimes arranged in a Romanesque manner, parallel and correlated with that of a female martyr saint, usually Saint Catherine of Alexandria or Saint Margaret, generally depicted one above the other (see Homoródszentmárton/Mărtiniș and Bögöz/Mugeni) or on opposing walls of the nave (see Gelence/Ghelinţa). This pairing of the victorious knights and the martyred virgins set up as examples, are in this specific combination a Hungarian phenomenon.

== Mythological interpretation ==
Before Gyula László, Géza Nagy suggested that an ancient Eurasian myth is behind the Christianized mural painting. The old myth is expressed by the fight between the two heroes representing light and darkness. In the literature the ballad of Anna Molnár also is related to the Saint Ladislaus legend.

== See also ==
- Gesta Ladislai regis
- Anjou Legendarium
- Sir Lancelot
