= Szekszárd Abbey =

Monastery in Szekszárd, Hungary

Coordinates: 46.34963991241357°N 18.699921197163377°E

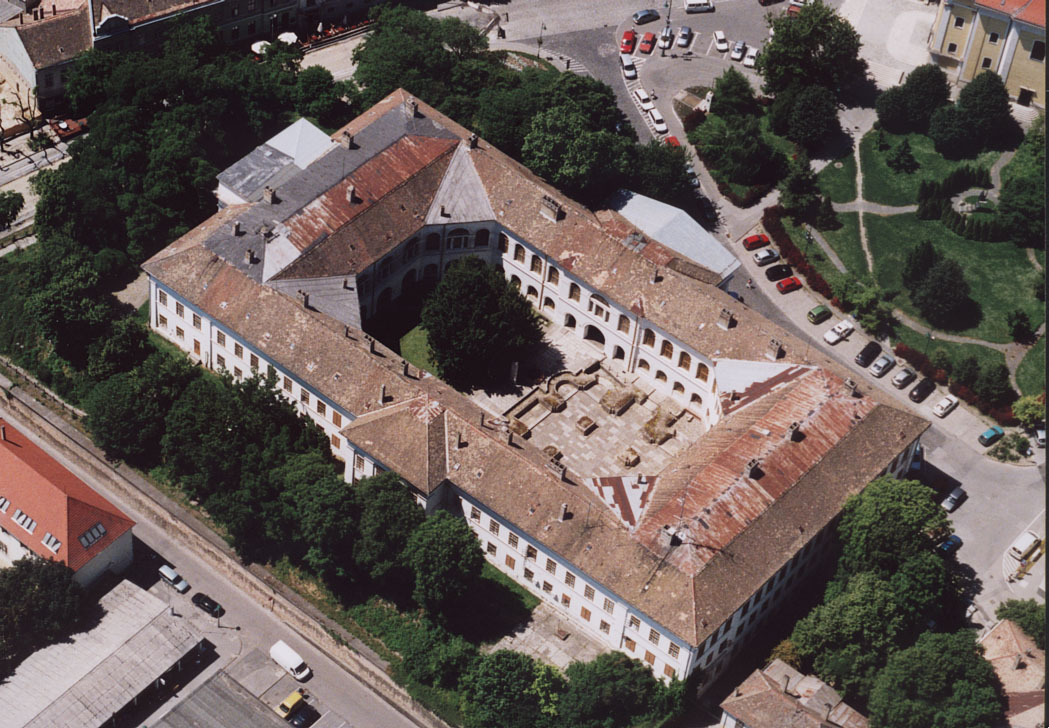
The ruins of the abbey in the courtyard of the Tolna County Seat building

The Szekszárd Abbey was a Benedictine monastery established in Szekszárd in the Kingdom of Hungary in 1061. It is dedicated to the Holy Savior.

== Sources ==
- Berend, Nora; Laszlovszky, József; Szakács, Béla Zsolt (2007). "The kingdom of Hungary". In Berend, Nora (ed.). Christianization and the Rise of Christian Monarchy: Scandinavia, Central Europe and Rus', c.900-1200. Cambridge University Press. pp. 319–368. ISBN 978-0-521-87616-2.
- Gaál, Attila (1994). "Szekszárd". In Kristó, Gyula; Engel, Pál; Makk, Ferenc (eds.). Korai magyar történeti lexikon (9-14. század) [=Encyclopedia of the Early Hungarian History (9th-14th centuries)] (in Hungarian). Akadémiai Kiadó. p. 629. ISBN 963-05-6722-9.
- Kiss, Gergely; Sarbak, Gábor (2009). "Szerzetesi intézmények: Szekszárd [=Monastic institutions: Pécsvárad]". In Fedeles, Tamás; Sarbak, Gábor; Sümegi, József (eds.). A pécsi egyházmegye története I.: A középkor századai (1009–1543) [=A History of the Diocese of Pécs, Volume I: Medieval Centuries (1009–1543)] (in Hungarian). Fény Kft. pp. 352–354. ISBN 978-963-88572-0-0.
