= Battle of Mogyoród =

1074 conflict between rival claimants to the throne of Hungary

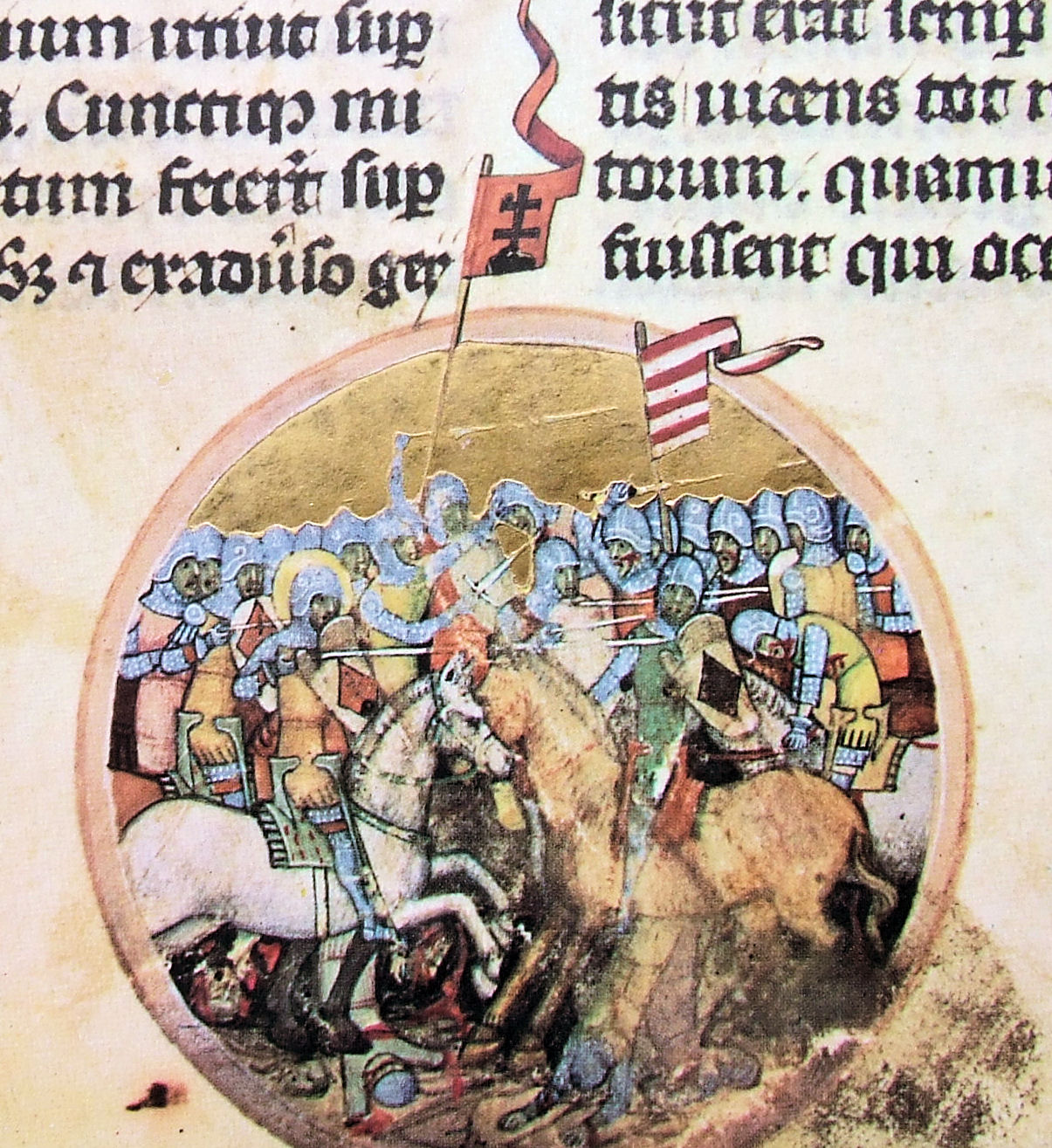
- Battle of Mogyoród—Chronicon Pictum
Date	14 March 1074
Location	Mogyoród, Kingdom of Hungary
Result	Solomon dethroned, Géza assumes control of the country

Belligerents
Géza's duchy Supported by: Duchy of Bohemia	Kingdom of Hungary; Supported by: Holy Roman Empire: Duchy of Carinthia

Commanders and leaders
Duke Géza; Duke Ladislaus; Otto I of Brno	Solomon, King of Hungary; Vid Gutkeled †; Ernyei †; Duke Markwart (POW); Svatopluk (POW)

Strength
Unknown	Unknown

The Battle of Mogyoród took place on 14 March 1074. It was an internal conflict between Solomon, King of Hungary and his cousins duke Géza and Ladislaus, who were claiming rights to the throne.

Solomon ruled for a few years, during which he allegedly submitted the country to the Holy Roman Empire as a vassal state to ensure his power over the kingdom at fear of his relatives usurping the throne. After a series of campaigns directed against the Byzantine Empire, which were led by Duke Géza and Ladislaus, Solomon grew bitter and felt unappreciated because of their success on the field. This provoked numerous actions of the king on their expense and was eventually followed up by attempts of murder. The princes decided to settle this in a battle and it ended favorably for them thanks to the assistance of Otto I of Brno and his forces, who was married to Euphemia, one of the sisters of Ladislaus and Géza.

The injured king fled to Germany soon after the battle and there he aimed to regain the crown with the help of his son-in-law. The outcome of this battle overjoyed all of the nation, since it was regarded as a decisive victory for Hungary's statehood.

== Sources ==
=== Primary sources ===
- Bak, János M.; Veszprémy, László; Kersken, Norbert (2018). Chronica de gestis Hungarorum e codice picto saec. XIV [The Illuminated Chronicle: Chronicle of the deeds of the Hungarians from the fourteenth-century illuminated codex]. Budapest: Central European University Press. ISBN 978-9-6338-6264-3.

=== Secondary sources ===
- Bagi, Dániel (2020). Divisio Regni. The territorial divisions, power struggles, and dynastic historiography of the Árpáds of 11th- and early 12th-century Hungary, with comparative studies of the Piasts of Poland and the Přemyslids of Bohemia. Arpadiana II., Research Centre for the Humanities. ISBN 978-963-416-206-3.
- Pauler, Gyula (1899). A magyar nemzet története az Árpád-házi királyok alatt, I. [The History of the Hungarian Nation during the Árpádian Kings, Vol. 1.] (in Hungarian). Athenaeum.
