= Péteri =

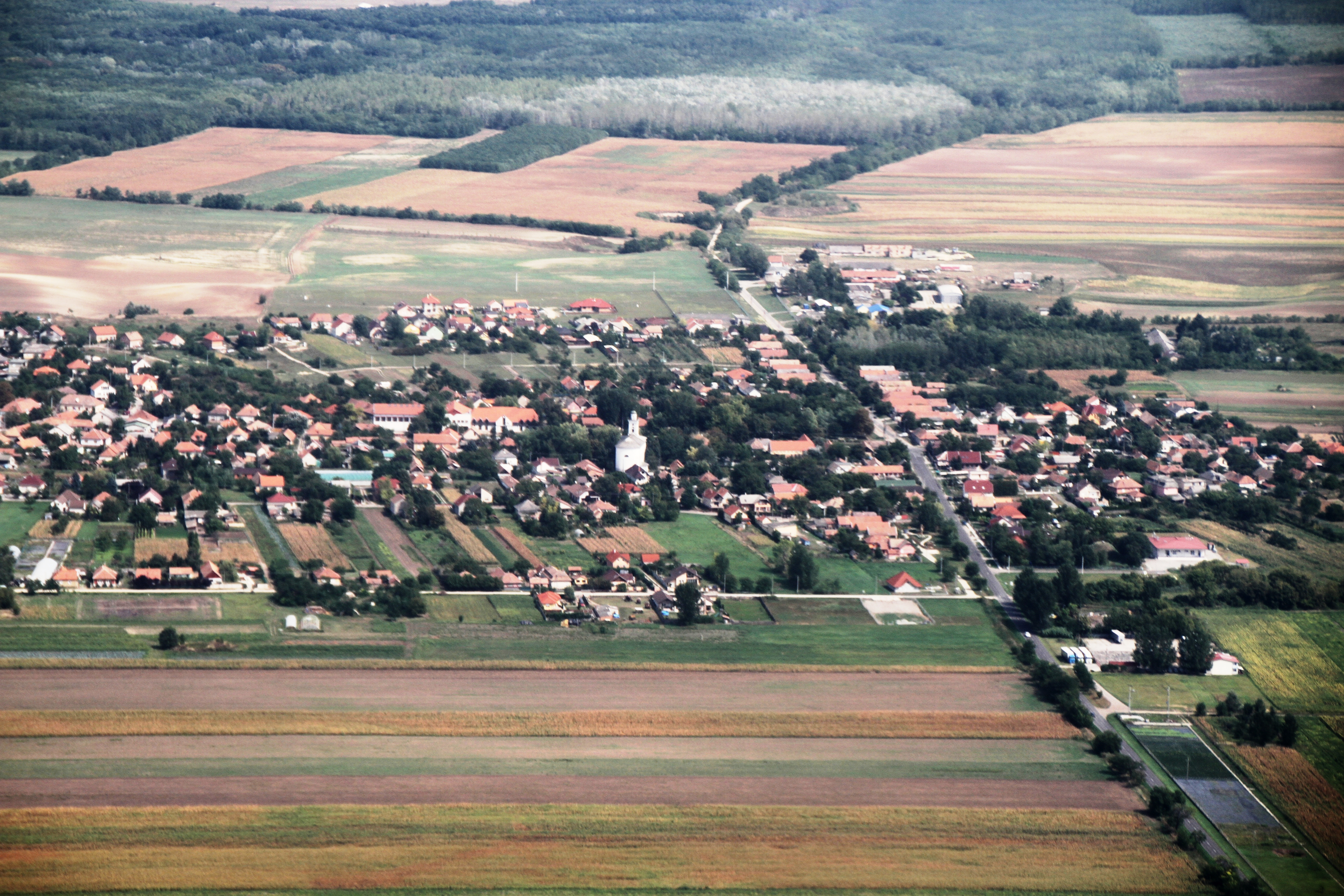

- Coat of arms

- Location of Péteri in Hungary
- Coordinates: 47.38521°N 19.41213°E
- Country: Hungary
- Region: Central Hungary
- County: Pest
- Subregion: Monori
- Rank: Village

Area
  - Total: 11.89 km^{2} (4.59 sq mi)

Population (1 January 2008)
  - Total: 2,154
  - Density: 181.2/km^{2} (469.2/sq mi)
- Time zone: UTC+1 (CET)
  - Summer (DST): UTC+2 (CEST)
- Postal code: 2209
- Area code: +36 29
- KSH code: 21847
- Website: https://www.peteri.hu/

Péteri is a village in Pest county, Hungary. It is situated between the towns of Monor and Üllő, immediately east of the Ferenc Liszt International Airport. Péteri has an Evangelical church.
