= Ladislaus II of Hungary =

King of Hungary and Croatia from 1162 to 1163

Ladislaus II
- Duke of Bosnia
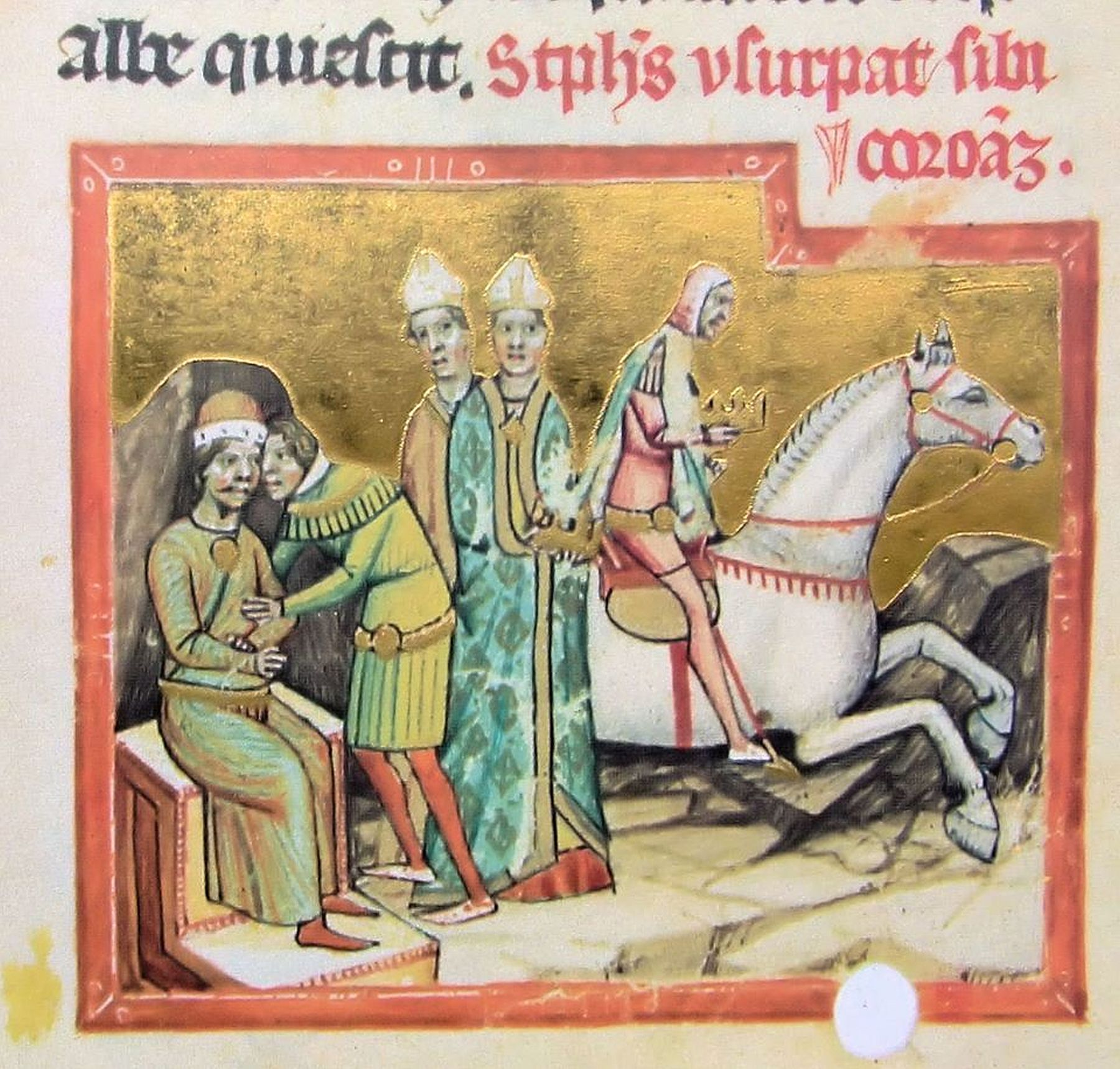
- Ladislaus II stealing the Holy Crown of Hungary (from the Illuminated Chronicle)

King of Hungary and Croatia contested by Stephen III
- Reign: July 1162 – January 1163
- Coronation: July 1162, Székesfehérvár
- Predecessor: Stephen III
- Successor: Stephen IV
- Born: 1131
- Died: 14 January 1163 (aged 31–32)
- Burial: Székesfehérvár Cathedral
- Issue: Mary
- House: Árpád dynasty
- Father: Béla II of Hungary
- Mother: Helena of Rascia
- Religion: Roman Catholic

Ladislaus II or Ladislas II (Hungarian: II. László, Croatian and Slovak: Ladislav II; 1131 – 14 January 1163) was King of Hungary and Croatia between 1162 and 1163, having usurped the crown from his nephew, Stephen III.

Ladislaus received the title of Duke of Bosnia from his father, Béla II of Hungary, at the age of six but never ruled the province. Instead, around 1160, he followed his younger brother, Stephen's, example and settled in Constantinople but both were to return to Hungary following the death of their elder brother, Géza II of Hungary, in 1162. Their return was backed by the Byzantine Emperor Manuel I Komnenos who used their return in a bid to expand his suzerainty over Hungary. Initially, the Emperor was planning to assist Stephen IV in seizing the throne, but the Hungarian lords were only willing to accept Ladislaus as king against the late Géza II's son, Stephen III.

Although the latter's staunch supporter, Lucas, Archbishop of Esztergom, refused to crown Ladislaus and excommunicated him, he was crowned by Mikó, Archbishop of Kalocsa, in July 1162 but died within six months of his coronation.

== Youth ==
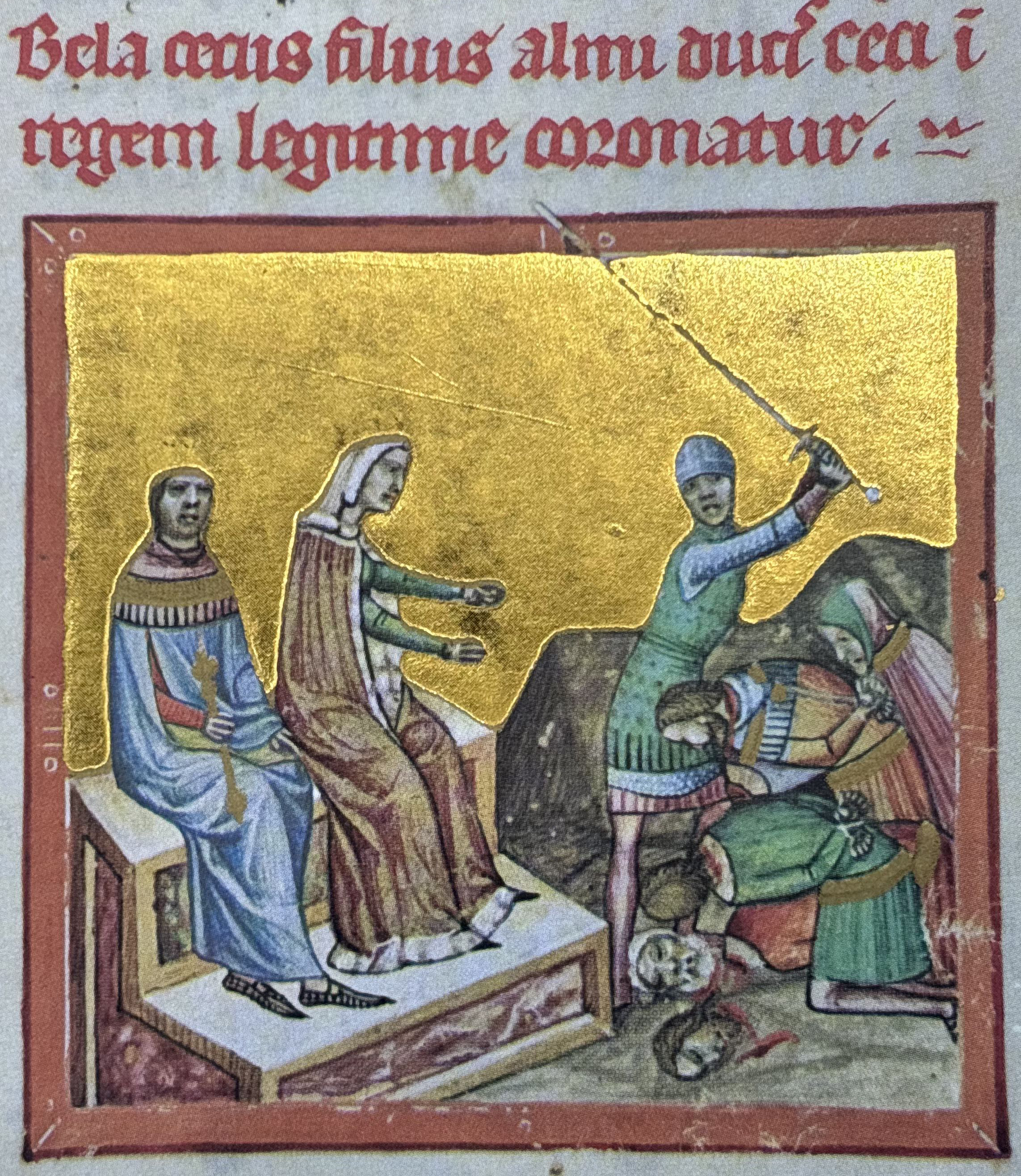
Béla's parents—Béla II of Hungary and Queen Helena of Rascia—at the assembly of Arad in 1131 (from the Illuminated Chronicle)

Born in 1131, Ladislaus was the second son of King Béla the Blind and his wife, Helena of Rascia. A few months after his birth, his mother took him and his elder brother, Géza, to an assembly held at Arad where the barons who were considered responsible for the blinding of the King were massacred upon the Queen's order.

Béla II's army invaded Bosnia in 1136, which he commemorated by adopting the title King of Rama after a small river. The following year, the King appointed Ladislaus Duke of Bosnia at an assembly of the prelates and barons in Esztergom. However, Ladislaus never personally ruled the territory and administration was overseen by the Ban, who was either an appointed or an elected official.

Béla II died on 13 February 1141 and was succeeded by his oldest son, Ladislaus's elder brother, Géza II. The Illuminated Chronicle writes that during his reign King Géza "granted ducal revenues to his brothers", Ladislaus and his younger brother, Stephen, in an unspecified year, although according to historian Bálint Hóman, this happened in 1146. Scholars Ferenc Makk and Gyula Kristó argue that the two dukes only received this grant around 1152, when the King appointed his son, Stephen, his successor.

Ladislaus's younger brother, Stephen, conspired against King Géza but failed in 1156 or 1157. Stephen first sought refuge in the Holy Roman Empire but later fled to the Byzantine Empire. Ladislaus followed him and also settled in Constantinople around 1160.

== Exile ==
Contemporaneous sources disagree on the cause of Ladislaus' departure for Constantinople. According to John Kinnamos, both Stephen and Ladislaus "became extremely hateful" towards King Géza after they had quarreled with him. On the other hand, Niketas Choniates wrote that Ladislaus "defected to Manuel, not so much because Géza loved him less than he should or that he feared a plot on his brother's part, but more because he was fascinated" by Stephen's favorable reception by the Emperor.

Géza II died on 31 May 1162 and was succeeded by his son, the 15-year-old Stephen III. However, Emperor Manuel, who "put a high value on the overlordship of Hungary", according to the contemporaneous John Kinnamos, decided to intervene on behalf of the late King's two brothers, stating that "it is law among the Hungarians that the crown passes always to the survivors of brothers". Initially, the Emperor planned to assist the younger of the two brothers, Stephen, as claimant to the throne. Bribed by Emperor Manuel's envoys, most Hungarian lords were willing to dethrone the young monarch but instead of Stephen, whom they viewed as a puppet of the Emperor, Ladislaus was chosen to be king. Six weeks after the young Stephen III's coronation, his partisans were routed at Kapuvár forcing him to leave Hungary and seek refuge in Austria.

The Emperor ... concluded that it was necessary to assist [Ladislaus's brother, Stephen], by the use of greater force. He marched out of Sardica and when arrived in the region of the Danube adjacent to Braničevo and Belgrade dispatched his nephew Alexios Kontostephanos with an armed force to [Stephen]. Once in control of Chramon, they did everything possible to secure the throne, winning over the most powerful of the Hungarians with gifts, seducing them with flattery, and inciting them with the greatest promises; however, the only thing they achieved was that the Hungarians accepted Ladislaus as their ruler..

— Niketas Choniates

== Reign ==
Ladislaus was crowned king in July 1162. The ceremony was performed by Mikó, Archbishop of Kalocsa, as the Archbishop of Esztergom, Lucas, was loyal to Stephen III and considered Ladislaus an usurper. Archbishop Lucas excommunicated Ladislaus, but was arrested and imprisoned in return.

According to the chronicle of Henry of Mügeln, Ladislaus granted one-third of the kingdom to his brother, Stephen, and the title of duke. Kinnamos wrote that Ladislaus granted the title urum ("My lord") to his brother as "among the Hungarians, this name means he who will succeed to the royal authority". Ladislaus attempted to reconcile himself with his opponents and released Archbishop Lucas at Christmas upon the request of Pope Alexander III. However, the Archbishop did not yield to him and continued to support Stephen III, who had returned to Hungary and captured Pressburg (present-day Bratislava in Slovakia). Ladislaus did not attack his nephew in Pressburg, but again imprisoned Archbishop Lucas.

Ladislaus "usurped the crown for half a year", according to the Illuminated Chronicle and died on 14 January 1163. He was buried in the Székesfehérvár Basilica.

== Family ==
Ancestors of Ladislaus II of Hungary

16. Béla I of Hungary
8. Géza I of Hungary
17. Richeza or Adelaide of Poland
4. Álmos, Duke of Croatia
9. Sophia
2. Béla II of Hungary
10. Sviatopolk II of Kiev
5. Predslava of Kiev
1. Ladislaus II of Hungary
12. Vukan I of Serbia/Marko
6. Uroš I of Serbia
3. Helena of Rascia
14. Constantine Diogenes
7. Anna Diogenissa
15. Theodora Komnene

Ladislaus seems to have been a widower when he arrived in Constantinople in about 1160, but both the name of his wife and her family are unknown. Ladislaus "could have married a woman of royal blood" at Constantinople, according to Choniates. However, continues Choniates, Ladislaus "refrained from marriage so that he should not forget to return to his country and thus bring ruin to his domestic affairs, enchanted by the spell of a wife". Ladislaus's daughter, Mary was married to Nicholas Michiel, son of Vitale II Michele, Doge of Venice.

== Sources ==
=== Primary sources ===
- Deeds of John and Manuel Comnenus by John Kinnamos (Translated by Charles M. Brand) (1976). Columbia University Press. ISBN 0-231-04080-6.
- O City of Byzantium, Annals of Niketas Choniatēs (Translated by Harry J. Magoulias) (1984). Wayne State University Press. ISBN 978-0-8143-1764-8.
- The Hungarian Illuminated Chronicle: Chronica de Gestis Hungarorum (Edited by Dezső Dercsényi) (1970). Corvina, Taplinger Publishing. ISBN 0-8008-4015-1.

=== Secondary sources ===
- Bartl, Július; Čičaj, Viliam; Kohútova, Mária; Letz, Róbert; Segeš, Vladimír; Škvarna, Dušan (2002). Slovak History: Chronology & Lexicon. Bolchazy-Carducci Publishers, Slovenské Pedegogické Nakladatel'stvo. ISBN 0-86516-444-4.
- Curta, Florin (2006). Southeastern Europe in the Middle Ages, 500–1250. Cambridge University Press. ISBN 978-0-521-89452-4.
- Engel, Pál (2001). The Realm of St Stephen: A History of Medieval Hungary, 895–1526. I.B. Tauris Publishers. ISBN 1-86064-061-3.
- Kristó, Gyula; Makk, Ferenc (1996). Az Árpád-ház uralkodói [Rulers of the House of Árpád] (in Hungarian). I.P.C. Könyvek. ISBN 963-7930-97-3.
- Makk, Ferenc (1989). The Árpáds and the Comneni: Political Relations between Hungary and Byzantium in the 12th century (Translated by György Novák). Akadémiai Kiadó. ISBN 963-05-5268-X.
- Makk, Ferenc (1994). "II. László". In Kristó, Gyula; Engel, Pál; Makk, Ferenc (eds.). Korai magyar történeti lexikon (9–14. század) [Encyclopedia of the Early Hungarian History (9th–14th centuries)] (in Hungarian). Akadémiai Kiadó. p. 396. ISBN 963-05-6722-9.
- Stephenson, Paul (2000). Byzantium's Balkan Frontier: A Political Study of the Northern Balkans, 900–1204. Cambridge University Press. ISBN 978-0-521-02756-4.

Ladislaus II of Hungary House of Árpád Born: 1131 Died: 14 January 1163
Regnal titles
Preceded by Stephen III	King of Hungary and Croatia; 1162–1163	Succeeded by Stephen IV
Vacant Last known title holder: Stephen Vojislavljević as knez	Duke of Bosnia; 1137 – before 1160	Vacant Title next held by Borić as ban
