= Stephen IV of Hungary =

King of Hungary and Croatia (1133–1165)

Stephen IV
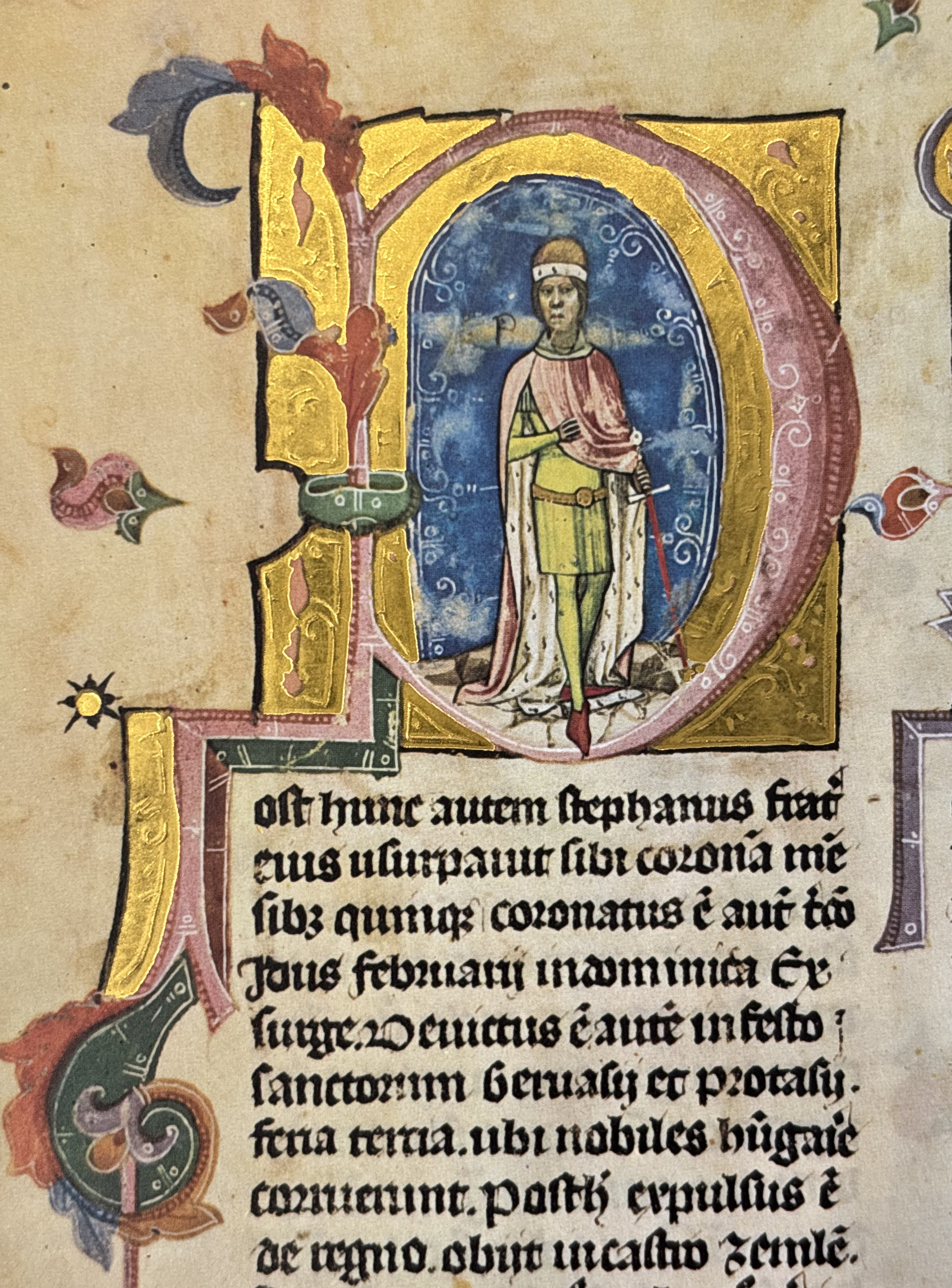
- Stephen IV depicted in the Illuminated Chronicle

King of Hungary and Croatia contested by Stephen III
- Reign: 27 January 1163 – 19 June 1163
- Coronation: 27 January 1163, Székesfehérvár
- Predecessor: Ladislaus II
- Successor: Stephen III
- Born: c. 1133
- Died: 11 April 1165 (aged 31–32); Zimony (now Zemun in Serbia)
- Spouse: Maria Komnene
- House: Árpád dynasty
- Father: Béla II of Hungary
- Mother: Helena of Rascia
- Religion: Eastern Orthodox prev. Roman Catholic

Stephen IV (Hungarian: IV. István, Croatian: Stjepan IV, Slovak: Štefan IV; c. 1133 – 11 April 1165) was King of Hungary and Croatia, ascending to the throne between 1163 and 1165, when he usurped the crown of his nephew, Stephen III. He was the third son of Béla II of Hungary, and when his conspiracy against his brother Géza II failed, he was exiled from Hungary in the summer of 1157. He first sought refuge in the Holy Roman Empire, but received no support from Emperor Frederick I. Shortly afterwards he moved to the Byzantine Empire, where he married a niece of Emperor Manuel I Komnenos, Maria Komnene, and converted to the Eastern Orthodox Church.

After Géza II died on 31 May 1162, Emperor Manuel attempted to assist Stephen against his nephew and namesake, Stephen III, in seizing the crown. Although the Hungarian lords were willing to leave their young monarch, they sharply opposed Stephen and elected his brother, Ladislaus II, king. Ladislaus II granted the ducatus, or duchy, which included one-third of the kingdom, to Stephen. Ladislaus II died on 14 January 1163, and Stephen succeeded him. Lucas, Archbishop of Esztergom, who remained a staunch supporter of the expelled young Stephen III, denied to crown him and excommunicated him. Stephen IV remained unpopular among the Hungarian lords, enabling his nephew to muster an army. In the decisive battle, which was fought at Székesfehérvár on 19 June 1163, the younger Stephen routed his uncle, forcing him once again to flee Hungary.

Stephen attempted to regain his crown with the assistance of Manuel I and Frederick I, but both emperors abandoned him. Emperor Manuel settled him in Syrmium, a province acquired from Hungary. He died of poisoning by his nephew's partisans during the siege of Zimony (now Zemun in Serbia).

== Childhood and youth (c. 1133–1157) ==
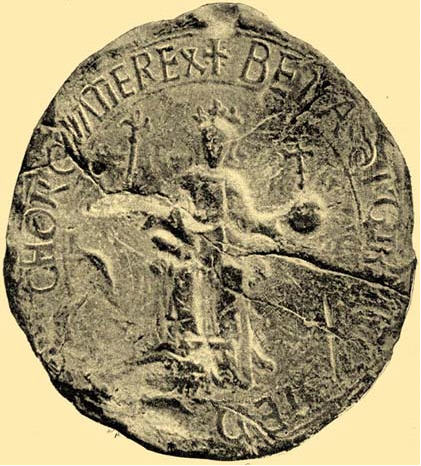
The seal of Stephen's father, King Béla II of Hungary

Stephen was the third son of King Béla the Blind and his wife, Helena of Rascia, born about 1133. The earliest recorded event of Stephen's life occurred during the reign of his oldest brother, Géza II, who succeeded their father on 13 February 1141. King Géza "granted ducal revenues to his brothers", Ladislaus and Stephen, according to the Illuminated Chronicle. While the chronicle does not specify the date of this event, historian Bálint Hóman wrote that it happened in 1146. However, scholars Ferenc Makk and Gyula Kristó claim it was later, in about 1152, at the same time Géza II officially appointed his son, Stephen, as his heir.

According to the contemporaneous Rahewin, Stephen was "accused before the king of aspiring to royal power", along with Stephen's friends, and especially their uncle, Beloš. In fear of being seized and executed by his brother, Stephen sought refuge in the Holy Roman Empire in summer 1157.

[Emperor Frederick I] held a diet at Regensburg, with a great attendance of princes, on the octave of Epiphany. Among the many present there were ambassadors of [King Géza II of Hungary]. For his brother, [Stephen] by name, had by certain men been accused before the king of aspiring to royal power. In this he was thought to have been instigated by Duke [Beloš], an uncle of them both, a very shrewd and scheming man, who seemed to be feeding the pride of a young man already accustomed to too much honor. But the king, suspicious of the great attention paid to his brother, and fearing worse things from him than was needful, now openly accused not the man himself so much as his friends and those of his household, and turned all that they said or did against him. After many accusations had been aired and many persons induced to bear false witness, the king was said to be planning to have his brother killed. The latter, having learned that the Roman empire is an asylum for the whole world, escaped by fleeing to the emperor and tearfully bewailed his fate and his brother's bitter cruelty toward him.

— The Deeds of Frederick Barbarossa

== In exile (1157–1162) ==
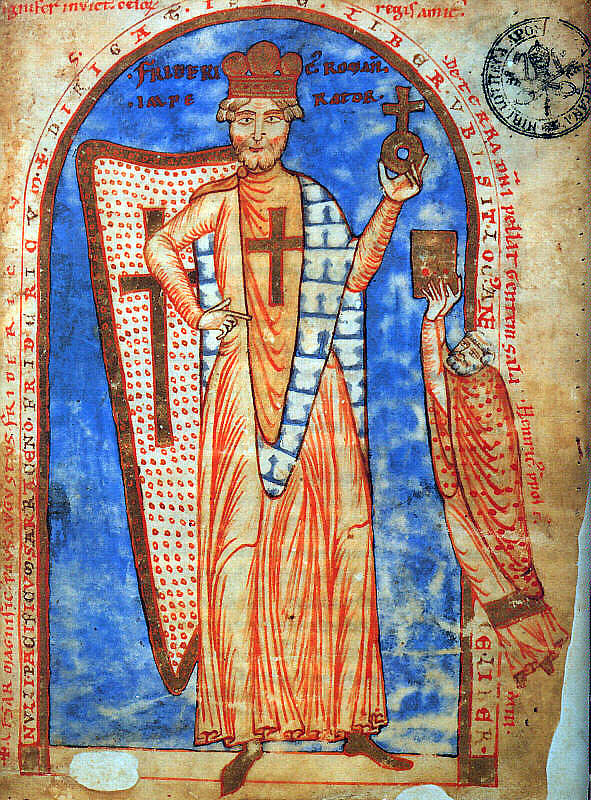
Frederick I, Holy Roman Emperor, who did not provide assistance to Stephen

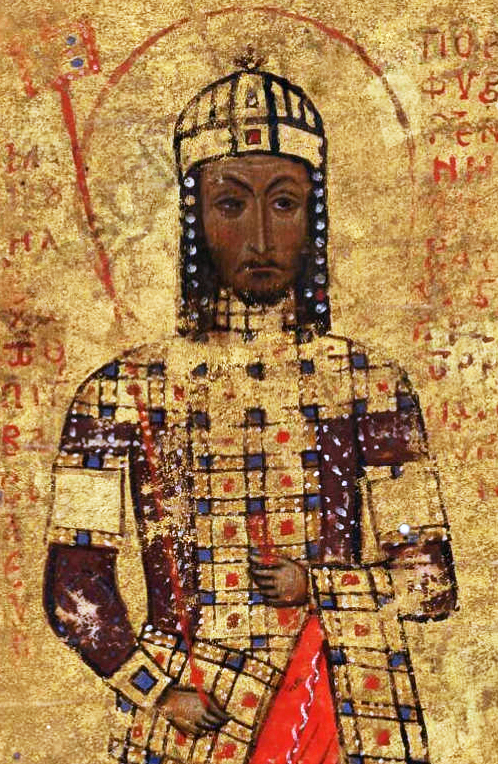
Byzantine Emperor Manuel I Komnenos who was willing to support Stephen in seizing the crown

Frederick I, Holy Roman Emperor, was willing to arbitrate the conflict between Géza II and Stephen, and dispatched his envoys to Hungary. In response, Géza sent delegates to the Emperor. Frederick I initially contemplated that "the dispute must be terminated either by a division of the realm or by the condemnation of one or the other", but finally "decided to defer to a more suitable time the settlement of this quarrel", because he was planning to invade Italy. As a result, with Frederick I's consent, Stephen left for Constantinople, as documented by Niketas Choniates, a contemporary historian, who wrote that Stephen fled "from the murderous clutches of his brother".

The Byzantine Emperor Manuel I Komnenos welcomed him and arranged Stephen's marriage with his niece Maria Komnene. According to Gerhoh of Reichersberg, Stephen converted to the Eastern Orthodox Church on this occasion. Stephen's brother, Ladislaus, also arrived in Constantinople around 1160, but he refused to marry a relative of the Emperor.

Manuel I, whose main concern was the insecurity of his empire's eastern frontier at that time, would not assist Stephen, therefore Stephen set out and again visited Emperor Frederick I in Parma, at some point near the end of 1160 or the beginning of 1161. He promised Frederick I "to pay him 3,000 marks every year" if the Emperor assisted him in obtaining Hungary. When Frederick, who was making preparations for the siege of Milan, did not promise any assistance to Stephen, he soon returned to Constantinople. (According to historian Paul Stephenson this episode happened in March 1164.)

Géza II died on 31 May 1162. Within days, his 15-year-old son, Stephen III, was crowned king by Lucas, Archbishop of Esztergom. Emperor Manuel I sent envoys to Hungary to promote the elder Stephen's claim to the crown against the young King, however, the Hungarian lords opposed him, because "they deemed it disadvantageous to join with a man who was related to the emperor by marriage and feared that as Hungarians they would be governed by him as king while he was ruled" by Emperor Manuel. Stephen returned to Hungary accompanied by a Byzantine army under the command of Alexios Kontostephanos. The Byzantine army marched as far as Haram (now Ram, Serbia), where new negotiations were opened between the Byzantine envoys and the Hungarian lords. They worked out a compromise agreement: the Hungarian lords acknowledged the claim of Stephen's elder brother, Ladislaus, to the crown, forcing Stephen III to flee to Austria six weeks after his coronation.

== Duke and king (1162–1163) ==
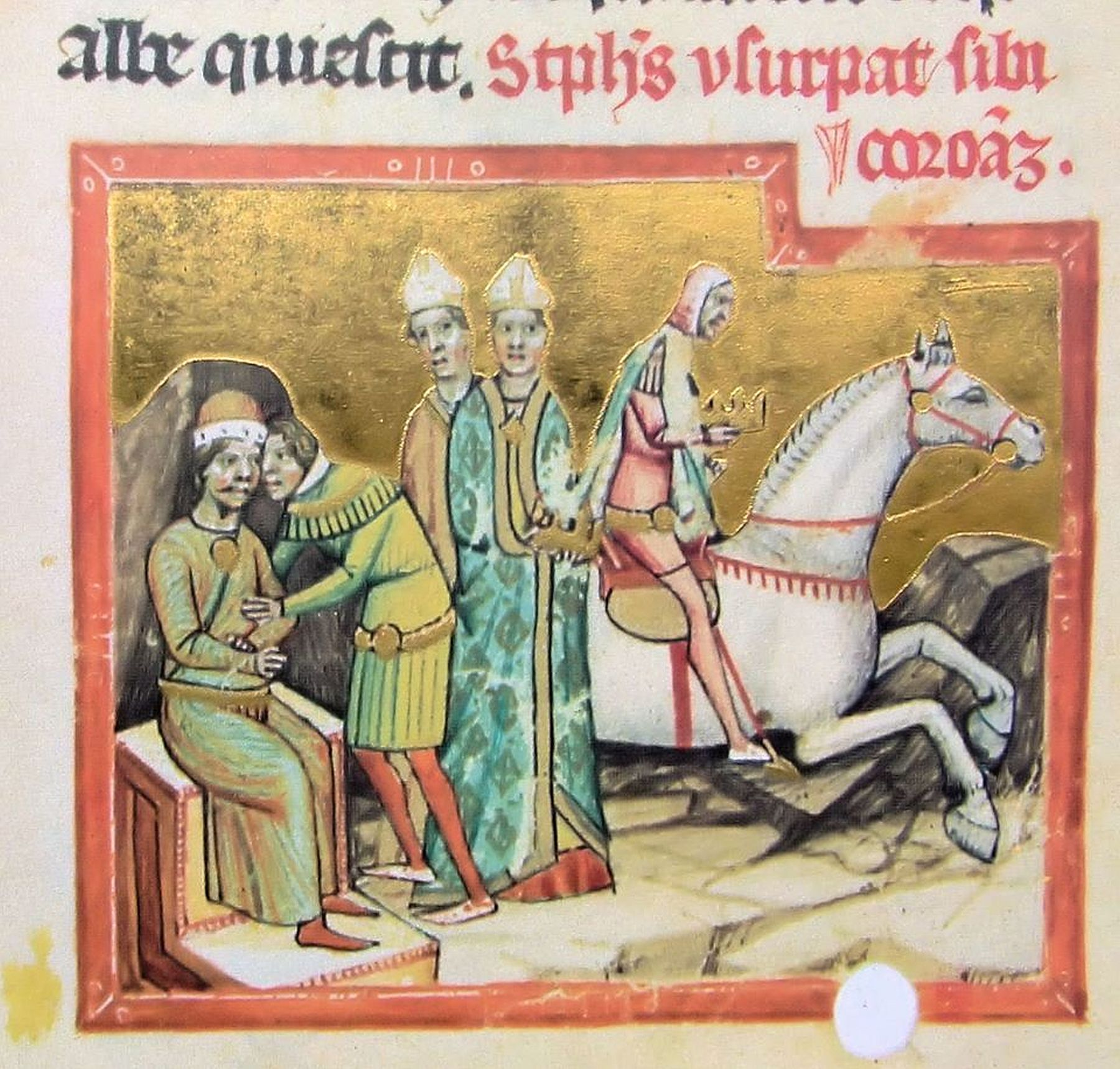
Stephen's brother, Ladislaus II, steals the crown from their nephew, Stephen III (from the Illuminated Chronicle)

Ladislaus was crowned king in July 1162 by Mikó, Archbishop of Kalocsa, because Archbishop Lucas remained loyal to the expelled king and considered Ladislaus a usurper. Stephen received "the rank of urum" ("Mylord") from his brother, because "among the Hungarians, this name means he who will succeed to the royal authority". The chronicle of Henry of Mügeln documented that the newly crowned King granted one-third of the Kingdom of Hungary to Stephen with the title of duke, while historian Florin Curta specified that Stephen's duchy included the southern regions of the kingdom.

Ladislaus II died on 14 January 1163. Stephen was crowned king thirteen days later. Mikó of Kalocsa once again performed the ceremony, because Lucas of Esztergom refused to crown him. Lucas even excommunicated Stephen, declaring his rule unlawful. According to the Gerhoh of Reichersberg, Stephen forbade the Hungarian prelates to send envoys to Pope Alexander III or to meet papal legates.

Stephen, who named himself Stephen III in his only preserved charter, "seemed grievous and was excessively oppressive to the principal personages" in Hungary, according to Kinnamos. A group of Hungarian lords started conspiring against Stephen in favor of his expelled nephew. At Stephen's request, Emperor Manuel sent an army to Hungary in March, however the news of the approaching imperial army strengthened Stephen's position, so he sent the Byzantines back. But it was too late, and a rebellion broke out as soon as the Byzantine troops left Hungary.

With Emperor Frederick I's approval, the expelled young Stephen mustered an army of German mercenaries and discontented Hungarian lords, and launched a campaign against his uncle. The decisive battle was fought at Székesfehérvár on 19 June 1163, with the elder Stephen routed by his nephew. Stephen IV was captured during the battle, but his nephew soon released him upon Archbishop Lucas's advice.

== Last years (1163–1165) ==
Having been expelled, Stephen either visited Emperor Frederick before leaving for the Byzantine Empire, or hastened to Sardica (now Sofia in Bulgaria) to meet Emperor Manuel. In Sardica, he proposed to accept Manuel I's suzerainty if the Emperor assisted him in regaining his crown. Emperor Manuel "presented him with money," and mobilized his army to invade Hungary. However, the Emperor soon "realized that it was then impossible for Stephen to rule the Hungarians' land", and negotiated a peace treaty with Stephen's nephew in Belgrade. According to that treaty, the young King agreed to allow the Byzantines to take possession of Syrmium and other parts of his kingdom in exchange for Manuel's renouncing any further support for his uncle. Abandoned by his protector, Stephen IV sent his envoys to Emperor Frederick I at the turn of 1163 and 1164, where assistance was also refused.

Stephen's nephew soon broke his treaty with Manuel I. Stephen, who was staying in Anchialus on the Black Sea (now Pomorie in Bulgaria), stormed into Syrmium in summer of 1164, winning over many inhabitants while marching through the region. Emperor Manuel joined Stephen in his invasion of Hungary. The young Stephen III received military assistance from abroad, forcing Emperor Manuel to conclude a peace treaty with him, and to promise not to support Stephen IV in the future. Again breaking the peace treaty, Stephen III of Hungary invaded Syrmium in spring 1165, causing Stephen to withdraw to the fort of Zimony. Stephen III laid siege to the fort, and according to some sources, the besiegers bribed "some of the Hungarians who served Stephen" into poisoning him with slow poison, resulting in the dethroned King's death on 11 April. The fort soon fell, and Stephen's corpse was "cast out before the city's gates" without a funeral. The corpse lied unburied before being interred in the church dedicated to Saint Stephen the Protomartyr in Zimony. At an unspecified date, Stephen's body was transferred to the Székesfehérvár Basilica.

[The] "Hungarians decided to get rid of the depicable [Stephen] by resorting to treachery. Agreed that poison was the best way of putting him to death, they searched for the right person to place the death-bringing cup in his hands. A certain attendant of [Stephen] named Thomas agreed to help them if they paid his price. This man who held out his hand for evil gain, was so sharp and quick in taking a man's life and severing the body from the soul found another method to send [Stephen] more speedily on his way to Hades. In bleeding [Stephen's] vein, he smeared with poison the bandage which covered the wound; from there it spread and diffused throughout the body and penetrated into the most vital parts and removed the man from life, thereby clearly confirming the uncertain and cowardly devices of men."

— Niketas Choniates: O City of Byzantium

== Family ==
Ancestors of Stephen IV of Hungary

16. Béla I of Hungary
8. Géza I of Hungary
17. Richeza or Adelaide of Poland
4. Álmos, Duke of Croatia
9. Sophia
2. Béla II of Hungary
10. Sviatopolk II of Kiev
5. Predslava of Kiev
1. Stephen IV of Hungary
12. Vukan I of Serbia/Marko
6. Uroš I of Serbia
3. Helena of Rascia
14. Constantine Diogenes
7. Anna Diogenissa
15. Theodora Komnene

Stephen's wife, Maria, was the daughter of sebastocrator Isaac Komnenos, who was Emperor Manuel I's youngest brother. Her mother was Isaac Komnenos's first wife, Theodora, whose family is unknown. Their marriage did not produce any children whose birth was recorded.

== Sources ==
=== Primary sources ===
- Deeds of John and Manuel Comnenus by John Kinnamos (Translated by Charles M. Brand) (1976). Columbia University Press. ISBN 0-231-04080-6.
- O City of Byzantium, Annals of Niketas Choniatēs (Translated by Harry J. Magoulias) (1984). Wayne State University Press. ISBN 978-0-8143-1764-8.
- The Deeds of Frederick Barbarossa by Otto of Freising and his Continuator, Rahewin (Translated and annotated with an introduction by Charles Christopher Mierow with the collaboration of Richard Emery) (2004). Columbia University Press. ISBN 0-231-13419-3.
- The Hungarian Illuminated Chronicle: Chronica de Gestis Hungarorum (Edited by Dezső Dercsényi) (1970). Corvina, Taplinger Publishing. ISBN 0-8008-4015-1.

=== Secondary sources ===
- Bartl, Július; Čičaj, Viliam; Kohútova, Mária; Letz, Róbert; Segeš, Vladimír; Škvarna, Dušan (2002). Slovak History: Chronology & Lexicon. Bolchazy-Carducci Publishers, Slovenské Pedegogické Nakladatel'stvo. ISBN 0-86516-444-4.
- Curta, Florin (2006). Southeastern Europe in the Middle Ages, 500–1250. Cambridge University Press. ISBN 978-0-521-89452-4.
- Engel, Pál (2001). The Realm of St Stephen: A History of Medieval Hungary, 895–1526. I.B. Tauris Publishers. ISBN 1-86064-061-3.
- Kristó, Gyula; Makk, Ferenc (1996). Az Árpád-ház uralkodói [Rulers of the House of Árpád] (in Hungarian). I.P.C. Könyvek. ISBN 963-7930-97-3.
- Magdalino, Paul (1993). The Empire of Manuel Komnenos, 1143–1180. Cambridge University Press. ISBN 0-521-52653-1.
- Makk, Ferenc (1989). The Árpáds and the Comneni: Political Relations between Hungary and Byzantium in the 12th century (Translated by György Novák). Akadémiai Kiadó. ISBN 963-05-5268-X.
- Makk, Ferenc (1994). "IV. István". In Kristó, Gyula; Engel, Pál; Makk, Ferenc (eds.). Korai magyar történeti lexikon (9–14. század) [Encyclopedia of the Early Hungarian History (9th–14th centuries)] (in Hungarian). Akadémiai Kiadó. pp. 293–294. ISBN 963-05-6722-9.
- Stephenson, Paul (2000). Byzantium's Balkan Frontier: A Political Study of the Northern Balkans, 900–1204. Cambridge University Press. ISBN 978-0-521-02756-4.

Stephen IV of Hungary House of Árpád Born: c. 1133 Died: 11 April 1165
Regnal titles
Preceded by Ladislaus II	King of Hungary; 1163–1165	Succeeded by Stephen III
