= Béla II of Hungary =

King of Hungary and Croatia from 1131 to 1141

Béla II
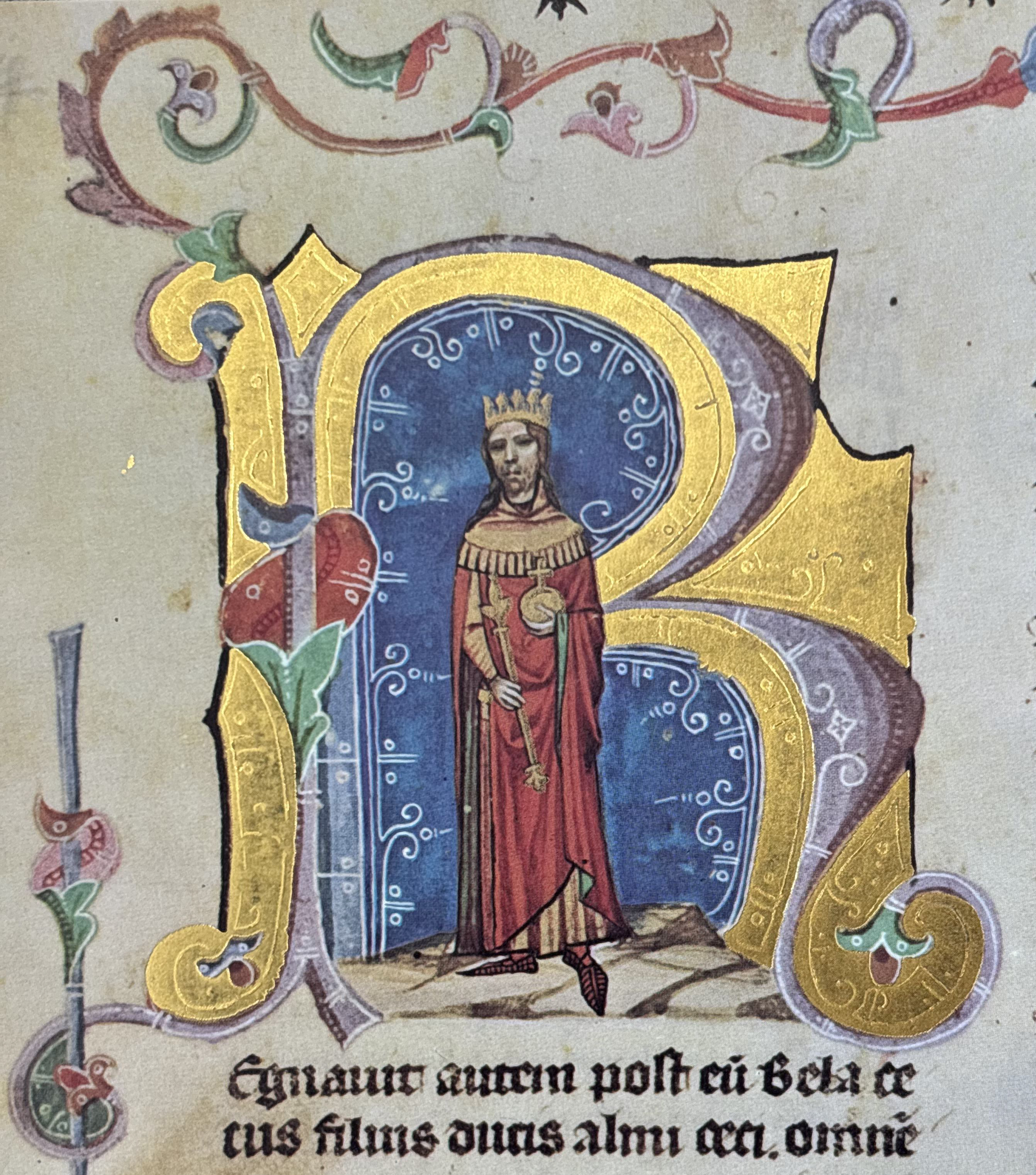
- Béla in the Illuminated Chronicle

King of Hungary and Croatia
- Reign: 1 March 1131 – 13 February 1141
- Coronation: 28 April 1131, Székesfehérvár
- Predecessor: Stephen II
- Successor: Géza II
- Born: c. 1109
- Died: 13 February 1141 (aged 31–32)
- Burial: Székesfehérvár Basilica
- Spouse: Helena of Serbia
- Issue more ...: Géza II; Ladislaus II; Stephen IV; Sophia; Elizabeth, Duchess of Poland
- Dynasty: Árpád dynasty
- Father: Álmos of Hungary
- Mother: Predslava of Kiev
- Religion: Roman Catholic

Béla II the Blind (Hungarian: Vak Béla; Croatian: Bela Slijepi; Slovak: Belo Slepý; c. 1109 – 13 February 1141) was King of Hungary and Croatia from 1131 to 1141. He was blinded along with his rebellious father Álmos on the order of Álmos's brother, King Coloman of Hungary. Béla grew up in monasteries during the reign of Coloman's son Stephen II. The childless king arranged Béla's marriage with Helena of Rascia.

Béla was crowned king at least two months after the death of Stephen II, implying that his accession to the throne did not happen without opposition. Two violent purges were carried out among the partisans of his predecessors to strengthen Béla's rule. King Coloman's alleged son Boris tried to dethrone Béla but the king and his allies defeated the pretender's troops in 1132. In the second half of Béla's reign, Hungary adopted an active foreign policy. Bosnia and Split seem to have accepted Béla's suzerainty around 1136.

== Early years until 1131 ==
Béla was the only son of Duke Álmos—the younger brother of King Coloman of Hungary—by his wife, Predslava of Kiev. Historians Gyula Kristó and Ferenc Makk write that Béla was born between 1108 and 1110. Álmos devised several plots to dethrone his brother. In retaliation, the king deprived Álmos of his ducatus or "duchy" between 1105 and 1108. Álmos did not give up his ambitions and King Coloman had him and the child Béla blinded between 1112 and 1115 to secure a peaceful succession for his own son, Stephen. According to one of the two versions of these events recorded in the Illuminated Chronicle, the king even ordered that Béla should be castrated but the soldier who was charged with this task refused to execute the order.

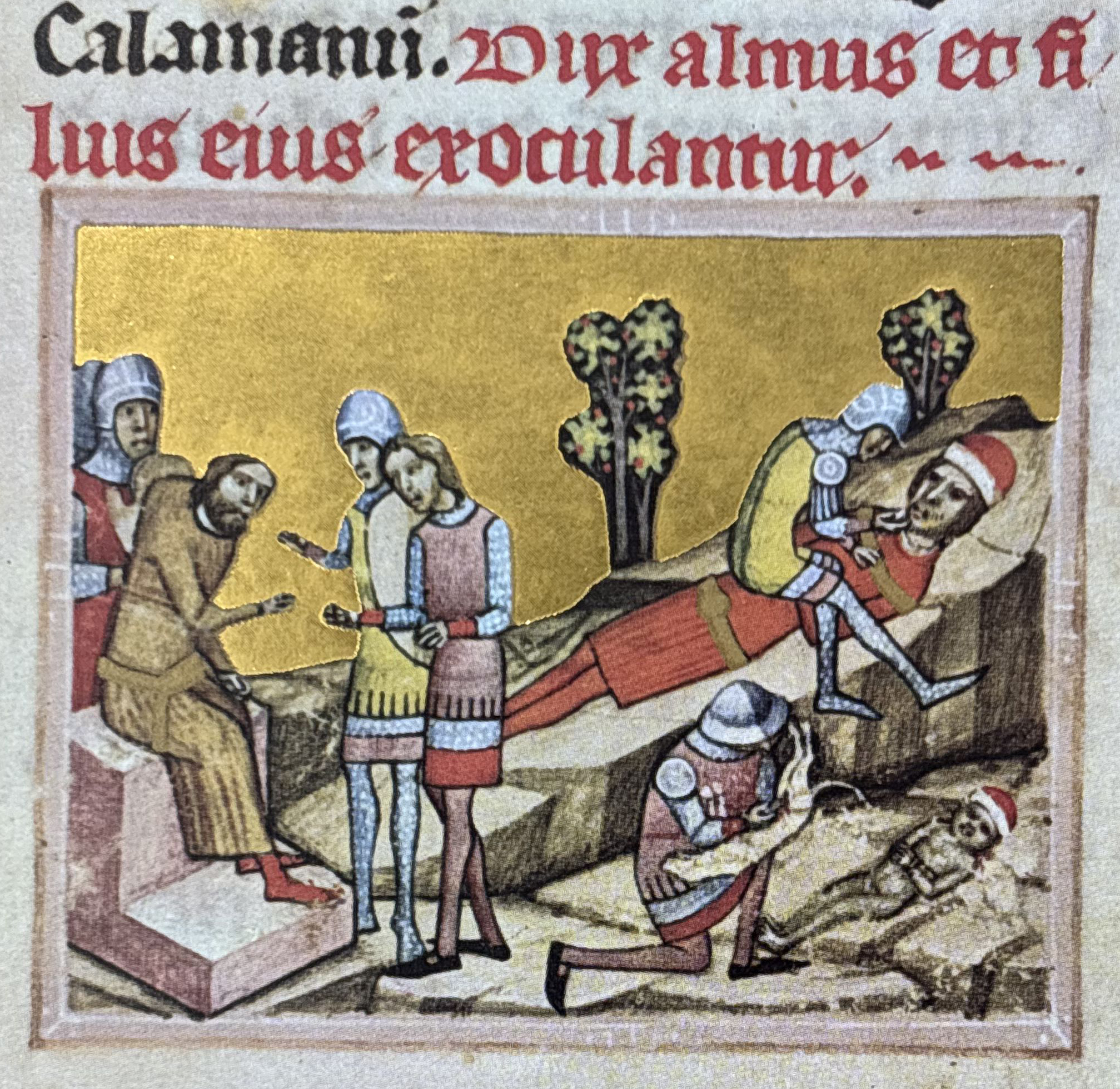
The child Béla and his father, Álmos are blinded on King Coloman's order (from the Illuminated Chronicle)

[The] King took the Duke and his infant son Bela and blinded them. He also gave orders that the infant Bela should be castrated. But the man who was instructed to blind them feared God and the sterility of the royal line, and therefore he castrated a dog and brought its testicles to the King.

— The Hungarian Illuminated Chronicle

After their blinding, Álmos lived in the monastery of Dömös, which he had founded. Kristó and Makk write that it is probable that Béla lived with his father in the monastery. The Annales Posonienses relates that "the child was growing in the reign of King Coloman's son, Stephen", who ascended the throne in 1116. Having hatched a failed plot against the king, Álmos left the monastery and fled to Constantinople in about 1125. For unknown reasons, Béla did not follow his father to the Byzantine Empire. The Illuminated Chronicle narrates that he was kept "concealed in Hungary from the fury" of the king. Béla settled in the Pécsvárad Abbey, whose abbot sheltered him in secret.

Álmos died in exile on 1 September 1127. According to the Illuminated Chronicle, Béla's partisans "revealed to the King, who believed him to have died after his blinding, that Béla was alive". On hearing this, King Stephen II "rejoiced with great joy, for he knew beyond doubt that he would have no heir". The king even arranged Béla's marriage with Helena of Serbia and granted Tolna to the couple around 1129.

King Stephen II died in early 1131. A late source—the Ottoman Turkish chronicle known as Tarih-i Üngürüs or The History of the Hungarians—narrates that Béla ascended the throne after his predecessor's nephew Saul, whom Stephen II had nominated as his heir, had died. Béla II was crowned in Székesfehérvár on 28 April, substantiating the reliability of this report. However, no scholarly consensus on the exact circumstances of Béla's ascension exists. According to Gyula Kristó, Béla was crowned by Archbishop Felician after a civil war between his and Saul's partisans, but Pál Engel does not mention any conflict related to Béla's succession.

== Reign ==
=== Consolidation (1131–1132) ===
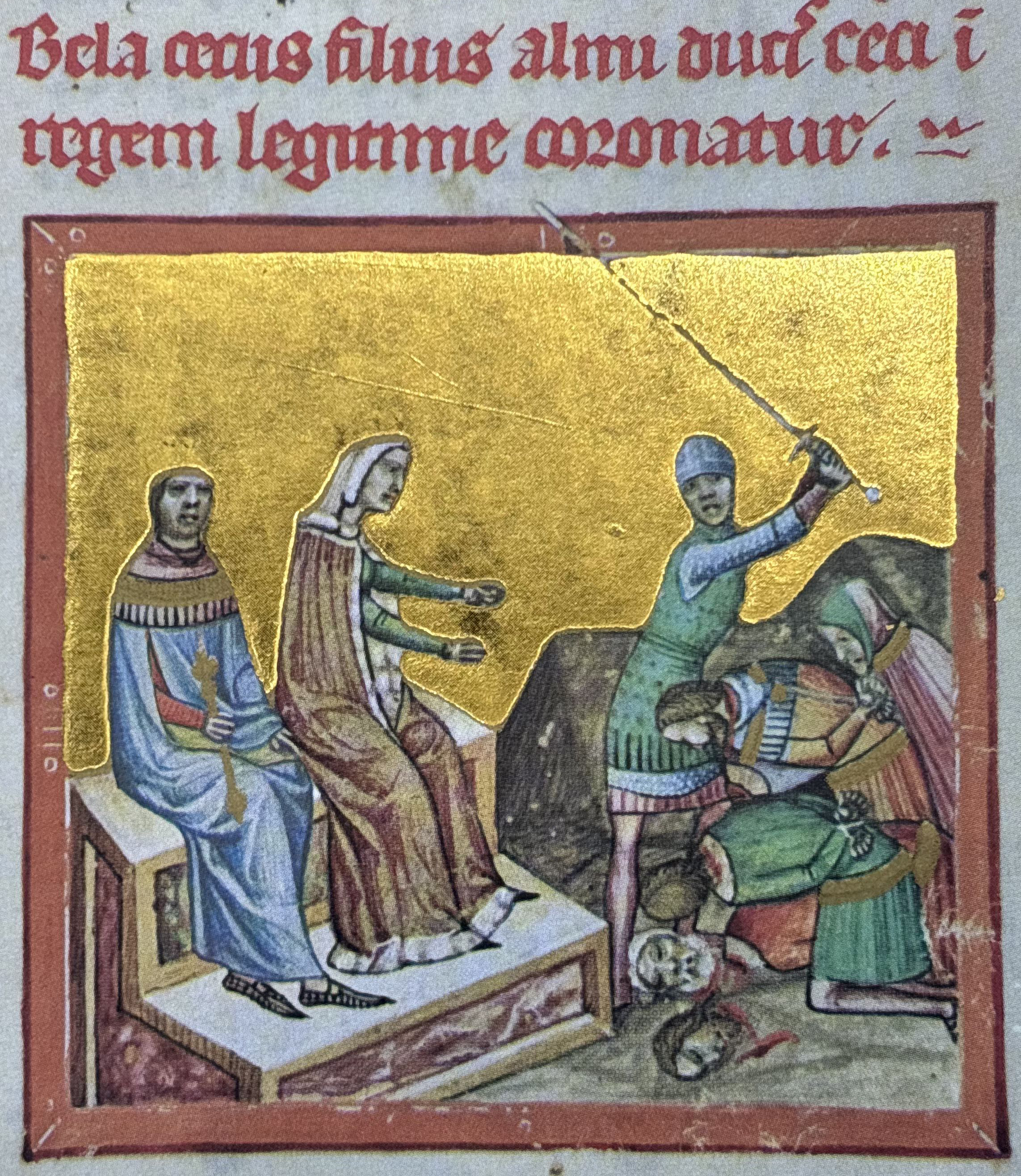
Massacre of Béla II's opponents on the orders of Queen Helena at the assembly of Arad in 1131

Béla's blindness prevented him from administering his kingdom without assistance. He put his trust in his wife and her brother Beloš. Both royal and private charters from Béla's reign emphasize Queen Helena's pre-eminent role in the decision-making process, proving that the king regarded his wife as his co-ruler. According to the Illuminated Chronicle, at "an assembly of the realm near Arad" in early to mid-1131, Queen Helena ordered the slaughter of all noblemen who were accused of having suggested the blinding of her husband to King Coloman. Béla distributed the goods of the executed magnates between the newly established Arad Chapter and the early 11th-century Óbuda Chapter.

Béla's was on good terms with the Holy Roman Empire, jeopardizing the interests of Boleslaw III of Poland who had been warring with the empire. The Polish monarch decided to support a pretender to the Hungarian crown named Boris. Boris was born to King Coloman's second wife Euphemia of Kiev after his mother was repudiated for adultery. After Boris arrived in Poland, a number of Hungarian noblemen joined him. Others sent messengers to Boris "to invite him that he should come and with their help claim the kingdom for himself", according to the Illuminated Chronicle.

Accompanied by soldiers from Poland and Kievan Rus, Boris marched into Hungary in mid-1132. Béla, now at war with a common enemy, entered into an alliance with Leopold III, Margrave of Austria. Before launching a counter-attack against Boris, Béla gathered a council near the river Sajó. The Illuminated Chronicle relates that the King asked "the eminent men of Hungary" who were present if they knew whether Boris "was a bastard, or the son of King Coloman". The King's loyalists then attacked and murdered all those who proved to be "disloyal and divided in their minds" during the meeting. Boris, who thought that the majority of the Hungarian lords supported his claim, sent one of his agents to Béla's camp to incite the King's personal retinue to mutiny.

[Samson] proposed to go to the assembly of the King and there openly and publicly insult him. All approved and [Boris] himself, misled by empty hope, gave him great thanks; for he wanted to complete what he had begun, and he thought that after the King had been thus insulted the kingdom would be his. The King had taken up his station near the river [Sajó], and as he sat in his tent with his nobles and soldiers, behold, [Samson] entered and said to the King: "Vile dog, what are you doing with the kingdom? It is better that your lord [Boris] have the kingdom and for your to live in your monastery, as your father did." There was commotion among the nobles of the realm, and Johannes, the son of Otto, the King's notary, said to Count Bud: "Why are we waiting? Why do we not seize him?" As they made to seize him, he hastily leapt upon a horse and fled.

— The Hungarian Illuminated Chronicle

Béla tried to persuade the Polish monarch to stop supporting the pretender. However, Boleslaw remained loyal to Boris. In the one decisive battle of the conflict, which was fought near the river Sajó on 22 July 1132, the Hungarian troops loyal to Béla and his Austrian allies managed to defeat Boris and his supporters.

=== Expansion (1132–1139) ===
Boleslaw III of Poland could not assist Boris after the Battle of the Sajó. Béla's allies—Soběslav I of Bohemia and Volodimirko of Peremyshl—invaded Poland each year between 1132 and 1135. Soběslav regularly—in 1133, 1134, 1137, and 1139—visited Béla's court. The Czech monarch even persuaded Lothar III, Holy Roman Emperor to force Boleslaw III to abandon Boris and recognize Béla's rule in Hungary in August 1135.

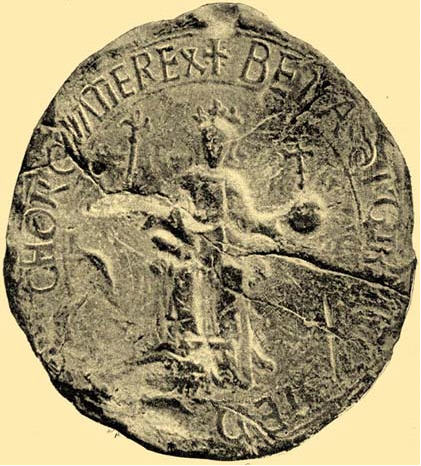
The seal of Béla II

Hungary adopted an expansionist policy after Boris's attempts to dethrone Béla. The chronicler Thomas the Archdeacon relates that Gaudius, who became Archbishop of Split in 1136, "enjoyed great favor with the kings of Hungary" and "often visited their court". The report suggests that Split accepted Béla II's suzerainty around 1136, but this interpretation of the sources is not universally accepted by historians. The exact circumstances surrounding the submission of Bosnia are unknown but the region seems to have accepted Béla's suzerainty without resistance by 1137. Historian John V. A. Fine writes that the northeastern regions of the province formed part of Queen Helena's dowry. The Hungarian army penetrated into the valley of the Rama River, a tributary of the Neretva River, in about 1137. Although Béla assumed the title King of Rama in token of the new conquest, the permanent occupation of the region is not proven.

Hungarian troops participated in a campaign launched by Grand Prince Yaropolk II of Kiev against Vsevolod of Kiev in 1139. Béla strengthened his alliance with the Holy Roman Empire. For this purpose, he gave financial support to Otto of Bamberg's missions among the Pomeranians and arranged the engagement of his daughter Sophia with Henry, son of the new German king Conrad III in June 1139.

=== Last years (1139–1141) ===
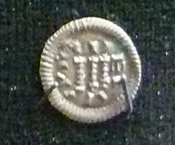
Béla's denar

According to the Hungarian chronicles, in the last few years of his life Béla became a drunkard. His courtiers took advantage of his drunkenness to receive grants from him. When he was in an alcoholic stupor, he sometimes ordered the execution of innocent men. Béla died on 13 February 1141, "on the Ides of February, a Thursday". He was buried in the Székesfehérvár Cathedral.

After King Bela had been established in his rule of the kingdom, he indulged himself much with wine. His courtiers found that whatever they asked of the King in his drunkenness he would grant, and after his drunkenness he could not take it back. In his drunkenness he delivered Poch and Saul, who were in religious orders, into the hands of their enemies, and they were killed without cause.

— The Hungarian Illuminated Chronicle

== Family ==
Ancestors of Béla II of Hungary

16. Vazul
8. Béla I of Hungary
17. A lady of the Tátony clan
4. Géza I of Hungary
18. Mieszko II Lambert of Poland
9. Richeza or Adelaide of Poland
19. Richeza of Lotharingia
2. Álmos of Hungary
5. Sophia
1. Béla II of Hungary
24. Yaroslav of Kiev
12. Iziaslav I of Kiev
25. Ingegerd Olofsdotter of Sweden
6. Sviatopolk II of Kiev
3. Predslava of Kiev

Béla married Helena of Serbia upon the initiation of his cousin, King Stephen II at the beginning of 1129. Helena was a daughter of Uroš I of Rascia and his wife Anna, whose origin is uncertain. Queen Helena gave birth to at least six children. The first of these, the future King Géza II of Hungary, was born in 1130. Three brothers—Ladislaus, Stephen and Álmos—were born in the early 1130s. Sophia, the first daughter of the royal couple, was born around 1135; she died as a nun in Admont Abbey after her engagement with Henry Berengar of Germany was broken. Béla II's youngest daughter, Elizabeth, who was born in about 1140, married Mieszko III of Poland.

The following family tree presents Béla's ancestors and some of his relatives who are mentioned in the article.

Sophia*	Géza I	unnamed Synadene*
Felicia of Sicily	Coloman	Eufemia of Kiev	Álmos	Predslava of Kiev
(?)
Sophia	Stephen II	Boris Kalamanos	Béla the Blind	Helena of Rascia
Saul	Géza II	Ladislaus II	Stephen IV	Álmos	Sophia	Elizabeth	Mieszko III of Poland
Kings of Hungary

*Whether Géza's first or second wife was his children's mother is uncertain.

== See also ==
- List of deaths through alcohol

== Sources ==
=== Primary sources ===
- Archdeacon Thomas of Split: History of the Bishops of Salona and Split (Latin text by Olga Perić, edited, translated and annotated by Damir Karbić, Mirjana Matijević Sokol and James Ross Sweeney) (2006). CEU Press. ISBN 963-7326-59-6.
- The Hungarian Illuminated Chronicle: Chronica de Gestis Hungarorum (Edited by Dezső Dercsényi) (1970). Corvina, Taplinger Publishing. ISBN 0-8008-4015-1.

=== Secondary sources ===
- Bartl, Július; Čičaj, Viliam; Kohútova, Mária; Letz, Róbert; Segeš, Vladimír; Škvarna, Dušan (2002). Slovak History: Chronology & Lexicon. Bolchazy-Carducci Publishers, Slovenské Pedegogické Nakladatel'stvo. ISBN 0-86516-444-4.
- Cartledge, Bryan (2011). The Will to Survive: A History of Hungary. Hurst & Company. ISBN 978-1-84904-112-6.
- Dimnik, Martin (1994). The Dynasty of Chernigov, 1054–1146. Pontifical Institute of Mediaeval Studies. ISBN 0-88844-116-9.
- Engel, Pál (2001). The Realm of St Stephen: A History of Medieval Hungary, 895–1526. I.B. Tauris Publishers. ISBN 1-86064-061-3.
- Fine, John V. A. Jr. (1991) [1983]. The Early Medieval Balkans: A Critical Survey from the Sixth to the Late Twelfth Century. Ann Arbor: University of Michigan Press. ISBN 0-472-08149-7.
- Kristó, Gyula; Makk, Ferenc (1996). Az Árpád-ház uralkodói [=Rulers of the House of Árpád] (in Hungarian). I.P.C. Könyvek. ISBN 963-7930-97-3.
- Makk, Ferenc (1989). The Árpáds and the Comneni: Political Relations between Hungary and Byzantium in the 12th century (Translated by György Novák). Akadémiai Kiadó. ISBN 963-05-5268-X.
- Makk, Ferenc (1994). "II. (Vak) Béla; Ilona; Rurikok". In Kristó, Gyula; Engel, Pál; Makk, Ferenc (eds.). Korai magyar történeti lexikon (9–14. század) [=Encyclopedia of the Early Hungarian History (9th–14th centuries)] (in Hungarian). Akadémiai Kiadó. pp. 90–91, 281, 583–589. ISBN 963-05-6722-9.
- Manteuffel, Tadeusz (1982). The Formation of the Polish State: The Period of Ducal Rule, 963–1194 (Translated and with an Introduction by Andrew Gorski). Wayne State University Press. ISBN 0-8143-1682-4.
- Stephenson, Paul (2000). Byzantium's Balkan Frontier: A Political Study of the Northern Balkans, 900–1204. Cambridge University Press. ISBN 978-0-521-02756-4.
- Wiszewski, Przemysław (2010). Domus Bolezlai: Values and Social Identity in Dynastic Traditions of Medieval Poland (c. 966–1138). Brill. ISBN 978-90-04-18142-7.

Béla II of Hungary House of Árpád Born: c. 1109 Died: 13 February 1141
Regnal titles
Preceded by Stephen II	King of Hungary and Croatia; 1131–1141	Succeeded by Géza II
