= Helena of Serbia, Queen of Hungary =

Queen Regent of Hungary from 1141 to 1146

Helena of Serbia
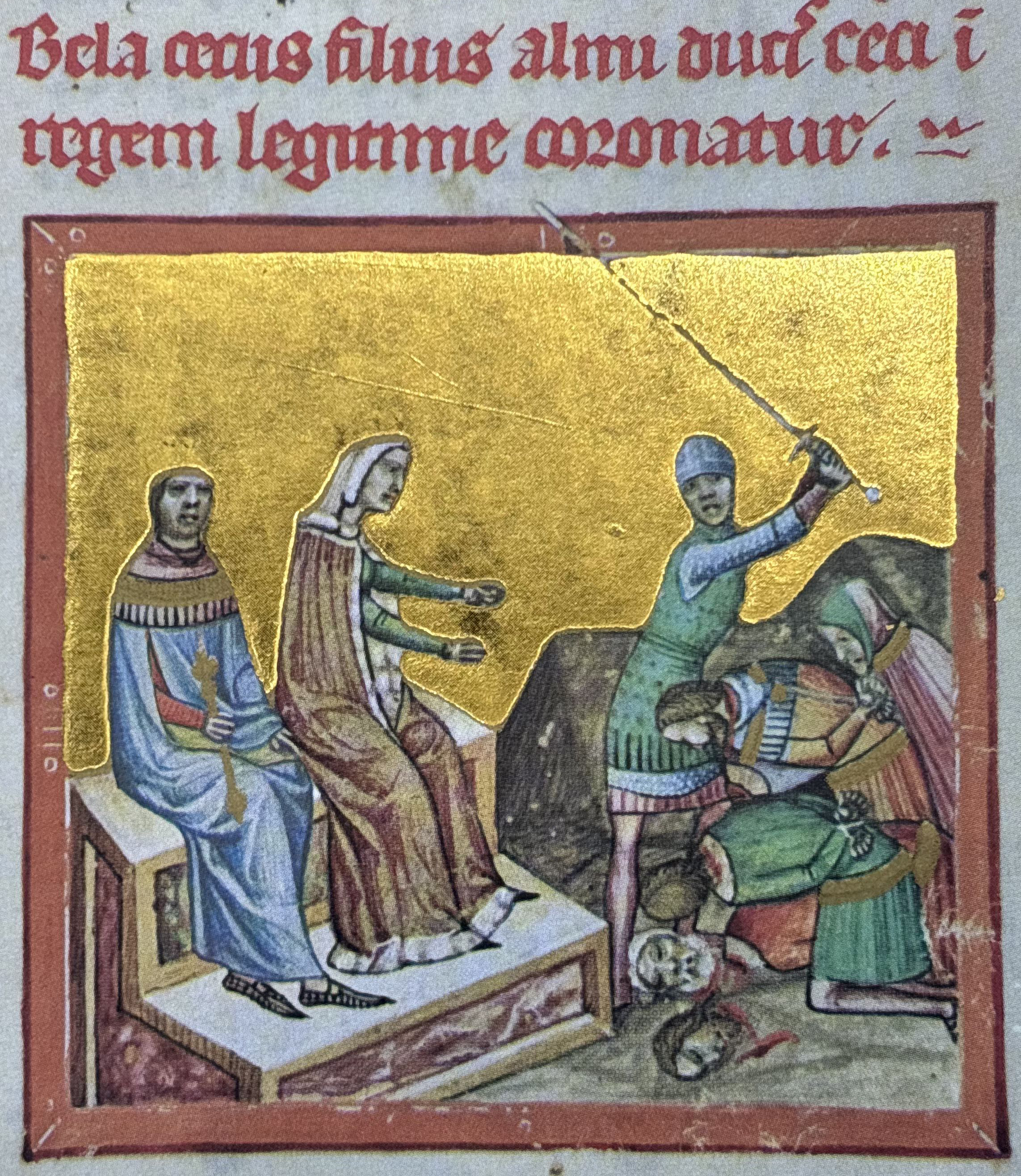
- Helena, depicted as witnessing the execution of one of her husband's enemies, in the Chronicon Pictum

Queen Regent of Hungary
- Regency: 13 February 1141 — September 1146
- Monarch: Géza II of Hungary

Queen consort of Hungary
- Tenure: 1131 - 1141
- Born: 1110; Grand Principality of Serbia
- Died: 1161 (aged 50–51); Budapest, Kingdom of Hungary
- Spouse: Béla II of Hungary
- Issue: Géza II of Hungary; Ladislaus II of Hungary; Stephen IV of Hungary; Álmos of Hungary; Sophia of Hungary; Elizabeth of Hungary, Duchess of Greater Poland
Names
- Jelena Vukanović
- House: Vukanović
- Father: Uroš I of Serbia
- Mother: Anna Diogenissa
- Religion: Roman Catholicism, previously Eastern Orthodoxy

Helena of Serbia (Serbian: Јелена/Jelena, Hungarian: Ilona; 1110 – 1161) was Queen of Hungary and Croatia as the wife of King Béla II. After her husband's death, she governed Hungary as regent from 1141 to September 1146 together with her brother, Beloš, during the minority of her eldest son, Géza II, came of age.

A daughter of Prince Uroš I of Serbia (r. ca. 1112–1145), she was arranged to marry Béla II in 1129 by his cousin, King Stephen II (r. 1116–1131). Her younger sons, Ladislaus II and Stephen IV, also ruled as kings of Hungary. She had two other brothers Uroš II and Desa besides Beloš.

== Life ==
=== Early life ===
Helena was the daughter of Serbian Grand Prince Uroš I (r. ca. 1112–1145) of the Vukanović dynasty, and Byzantine princess Anna Diogenissa. Her father had participated in the Byzantine-Hungarian War (1127–29), on the side of King Stephen II of Hungary. The Hungarian Army had destroyed Byzantine Belgrade and penetrated to Naissos (Niš), Serdica (Sofia) and Philippopolis (Plovdiv).

Around 1129, King Stephen II arranged her marriage with his cousin Béla, who had been blinded on the order of the king's father, King Coloman of Hungary (r. 1095–1116). Béla and his father Almos were blinded, so that they will be removed from the line of succession. However, King Stephen was childless and decided to recognise Béla as his successor. Uroš I had prior to this suffered to both Hungary and Byzantium, so he happily befriended the Hungarian king. King Stephen II granted estates near Tolna to the newly wed couple.

=== Queen consort ===
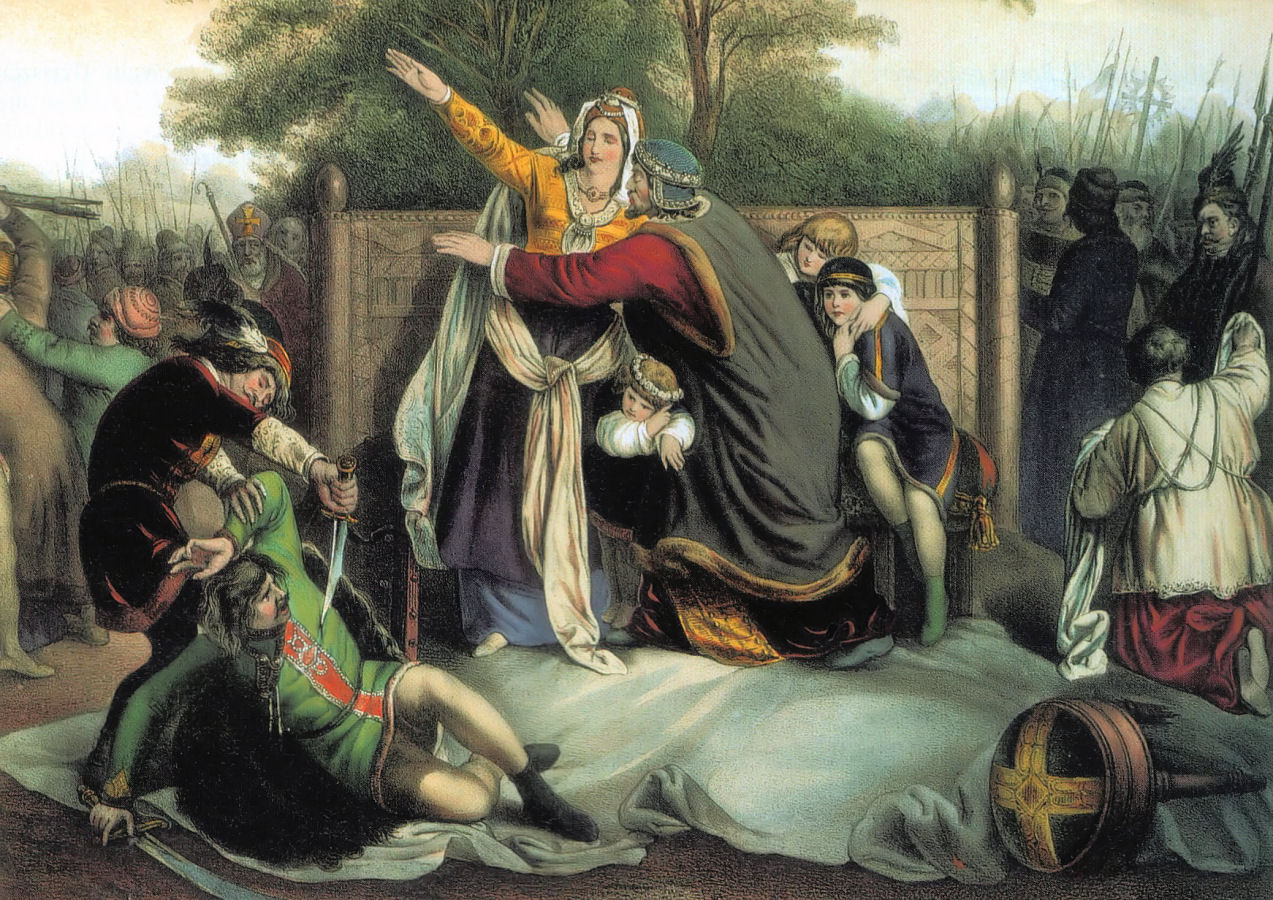
Execution of Hungarian nobility in Arad, by Geiger Péter N. János (1805–1880).

Following the childless king's death, her husband was crowned King of Hungary on 28 April 1131. Queen Helena had great influence on her husband, and the Hungarian state. They had six children: Géza II, Ladislaus II, Stephen IV, Álmos, Sophia and Elisabeth or Gertrud. She was to great help to her husband and governed the state during his rule. She was loyal to her husband and state, and it was she who persuaded the nobles at an assembly in Arad to execute 68 Hungarian aristocrats who had plotted with King Coloman to blind her husband. According to contemporary sources she was attending the execution with her son Béla [_{there is no such son by that name, perhaps baby Géza or spouse Béla?}], in order to secure the death of her husband's enemies.

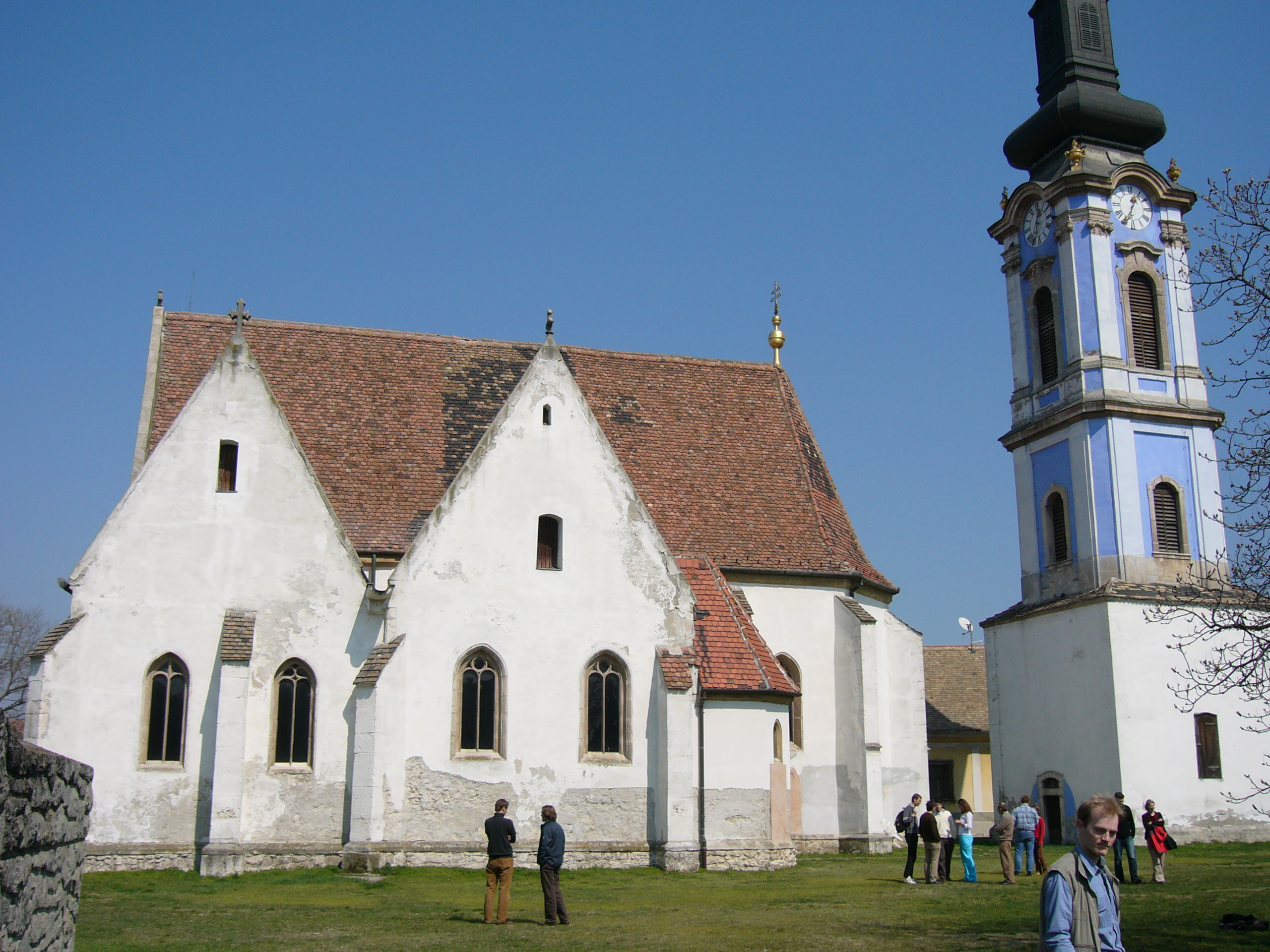
Serbian Kovin Monastery was founded by Helena

She settled Serbs in Csepel Island, and Ráckeve, where she built a monastery and church which exist still today.

=== Regency ===
When her husband died on 13 February 1141, their eldest son Géza II was still a child, therefore Helena and her brother Beloš Vukanović governed the Kingdom of Hungary until September 1146 when Géza II came of age. Beloš was Palatine of Hungary, the highest-ranking official, from 1141 to 1161, and Ban of Slavonia from 1146 to 1157. Helena continued to hold great influence on the rule and with the help of her brother Hungary had good relations and peace on its southern borders. In the period of Bela's death, the German-Hungarian relations had been shattered and the engagement of Henric and Sophia, Helena's daughter, was canceled. Sophia took monastic vows and became an abbess at Admont, in Styria.

=== Rule of Géza II and aftermath ===
During the rule of Géza II, Stephen IV and Ladislaus II were not satisfied with their titles and possessions, so they sought help with the Holy Roman Emperors and Byzantine Emperors. The plots against Géza II had no success, and after his death (1161) Manuel I Komnenos saw a good opportunity to expand Byzantine influence in Hungary. Manuel helped to dethrone Stephen III, son of Géza II, and place firstly Ladislaus II and then Stephen IV for a short time. Finally, Stephen III secured the throne in 1163. Queen Helena is believed to have died in 1161.

== Marriage and children ==
# c. 1129: King Béla II of Hungary (c. 1110 – 13 February 1141)

- Elisabeth or Gertrud (c. 1129 – before 1155), wife of duke Mieszko III of Poland
- King Géza II of Hungary (c. 1130 – 3 May 1162)
- King Ladislaus II of Hungary (1131 – 14 January 1163)
- King Stephen IV of Hungary (c. 1133 – 11 April 1165)
- Álmos (?)
- Sophia (c. 1136 – ?), nun at Admont (Styria)

Royal titles
Preceded by Daughter of Robert I of Capua	Queen of Hungary c. 1131–c. 1141	Succeeded by Euphrosyne of Kiev
