= Basilica of the Assumption of the Blessed Virgin Mary, Székesfehérvár =

11th-century ruined Catholic basilica in Hungary

Cathedral Basilica of the Assumption of the Blessed Virgin Mary
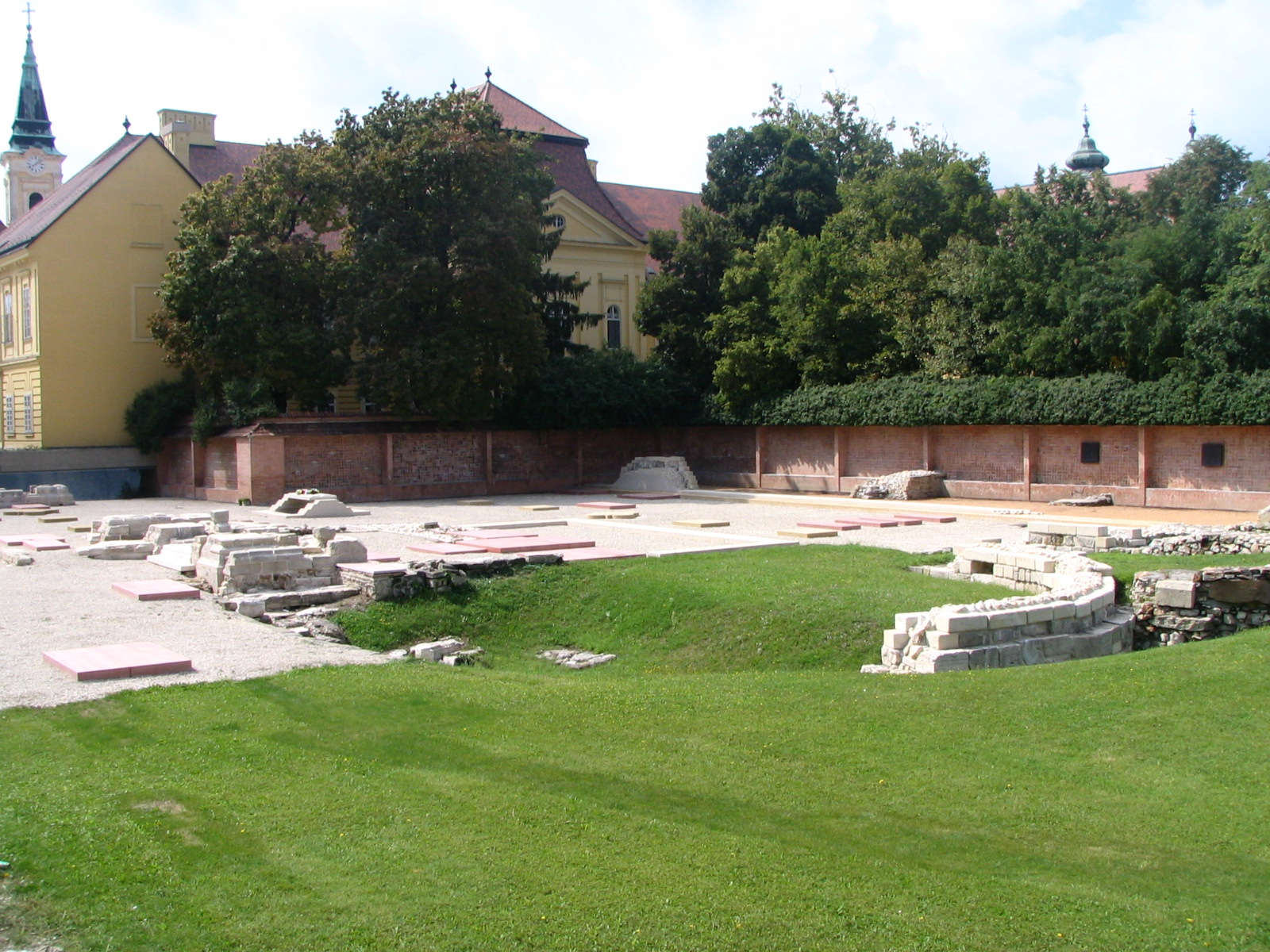
- Ruins of the basilica

Religion
- Affiliation: Roman Catholicism
- Status: ruined

Location
- Location: Székesfehérvár, Hungary
- Interactive map of Cathedral Basilica of the Assumption of the Blessed Virgin Mary
- Coordinates: 47.1917°N 18.4107°E

The Basilica of the Assumption of the Blessed Virgin Mary (Hungarian: Nagyboldogasszony-bazilika) was a basilica in Székesfehérvár (Latin: Alba Regia), Hungary. From the year 1000 until 1527, it was the site of the coronation of the Hungarian monarch. After the Ottomans occupied the city in 1543, coronations of the Hungarian monarch moved elsewhere; the building was extensively damaged in a fire in 1601. It was replaced by the Cathedral Basilica of Székesfehérvár in 1777.

== Background ==
The Basilica of the Assumption of the Blessed Virgin Mary was built in the late 1010s by Saint Stephen I, the first King of Hungary. It was never episcopal, but it was used as the principal church of the rulers of Hungary.

The basilica was the most significant place of the Kingdom of Hungary in the Middle Ages, as it contained the crown jewels, including the throne, the Holy Crown of Hungary, the treasury and the archives. 37 kings and 39 queens were crowned in this basilica and 15 were buried in it. In 1543, the Turks occupied Székesfehérvár. The royal graves were ransacked and the basilica was used to store gunpowder, while St. Martin's Cathedral in Pozsony (today Bratislava, Slovakia) became the new coronation site.

In 1601, the building was destroyed by fire. During this time, the Ottoman rule of the city was interrupted for about one year.

Its ruins were demolished and used for the construction of the new episcopal residence and for the reconstruction of another old church which in the 18th century became the cathedral of the Diocese of Szekesfehervar, erected in 1777.

In the late 1930s, St. Stephen's Mausoleum was erected behind the Basilica's ruined apse.

== Coronations ==
List of Hungarian monarchs who were crowned in Royal Basilica of Székesfehérvár.

- Stephen I (1000)
- Peter (1038)
- Samuel (1044)
- Andrew I (1046)
- Béla I (1060)
- Solomon (1063)
- Géza I (1075)
- Ladislaus I (1081)
- Coloman (1095)
- Stephen II (1116)
- Béla II (1131)
- Stephen III (1162)
- Ladislaus II (1162)
- Stephen IV (1163)
- Béla III (1173)
- Ladislaus III (1204)
- Andrew II (1205)
- Béla IV (1235)
- Stephen V (1246, 1270)
- Ladislaus IV (1272)
- Andrew III (1290)
- Wenceslaus (1301)
- Otto (1305)
- Charles I (1310)
- Louis I (1342)
- Mary (1382)
- Sigismund (1387)
- Albert (1437)
- Ladislaus V (1440)
- Vladislaus I (1440)
- Matthias I (1464)
- Vladislaus II (1490)
- Louis II (1508)
- John I (1526)
- Ferdinand I (1527)

== Burials ==
Hungarian monarchs and royal family members were buried in Royal Basilica of Székesfehérvár. (Only the list of buried monarchs is complete but the list of buried royal family members is not complete)

- Prince Saint Emeric (1031)
- King Saint Stephen I (1038)
- Queen consort Felicia of Sicily (c. 1102)
- King Coloman (1116)
- Prince Álmos (1137), he died in 1127 in Constantinople, his son King Béla II moved back and reburied his remains in 1137
- King Béla II (1141)
- King Géza II (1162)
- King Ladislaus II (1162)
- King Stephen IV (1165)
- Queen consort Agnes of Antioch (1184), her remains were later moved with her husband King Béla III
- King Béla III (1196), his remains were moved in 1848 and reburied with his wife Agnes of Antioch in the Matthias Church in Budapest in 1898
- King Ladislaus III (1205)
- Queen consort Maria of Bytom (1317)
- King Charles I (1342)
- King Louis I (1342)
- Princess Catherine (1378)
- Queen consort Elizabeth of Bosnia (1390), wife of King Louis I, she was secretly buried in St Chrysogonus's Church in Zadar in 1387, Elizabeth's body was moved and reburied in 1390 in the Székesfehérvár Basilica
- King Albert (1439)
- Queen consort Elizabeth of Luxembourg (1442)
- King Matthias I (1490)
- King Vladislaus II (1516)
- Queen consort Anne of Foix-Candale (1516), she died in 1506 and buried in Buda, in 1516 she was reburied with his husband King Vladislaus II
- King Louis II (1526)
- King John I (1540)

Hungarian nobles were also buried in Royal Basilica of Székesfehérvár. (The list is not complete)

- Philip Drugeth (1327)
- Pipo of Ozora (1426)

== Gallery ==
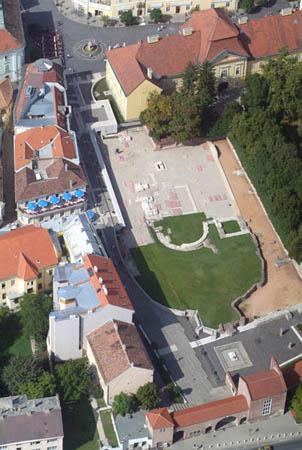
Aerial view of the ruins

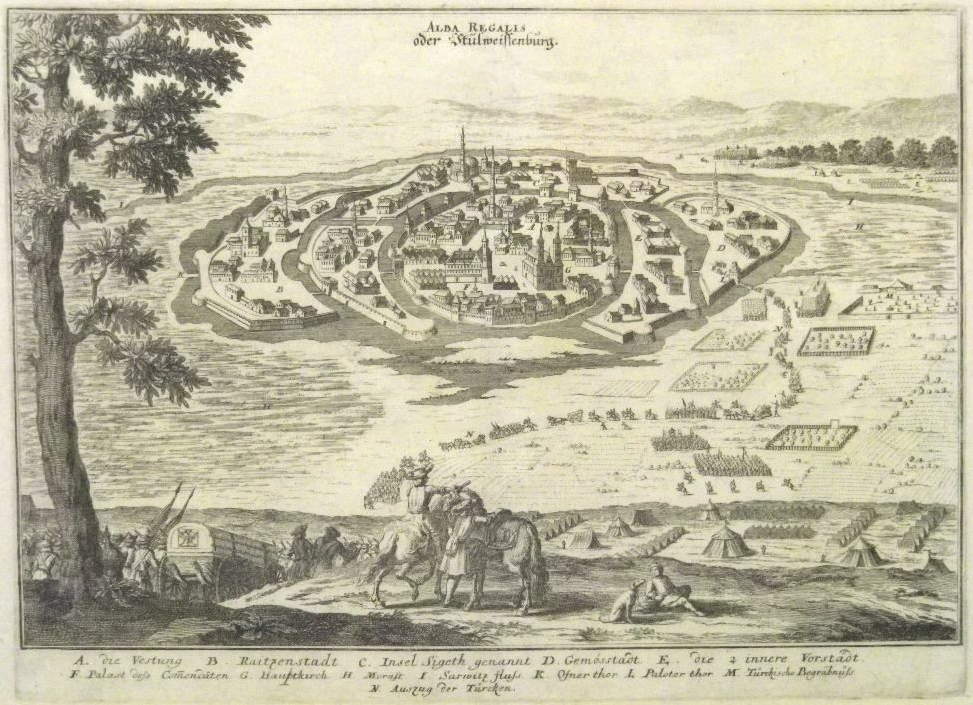
Merian's Theatrum Europaeum presents an almost peaceful exit (N) of the Turkish garrison out of an undestroyed Székesfehérvár after the Christian interim reconquest in 1601;
G = "main church" – the basílica

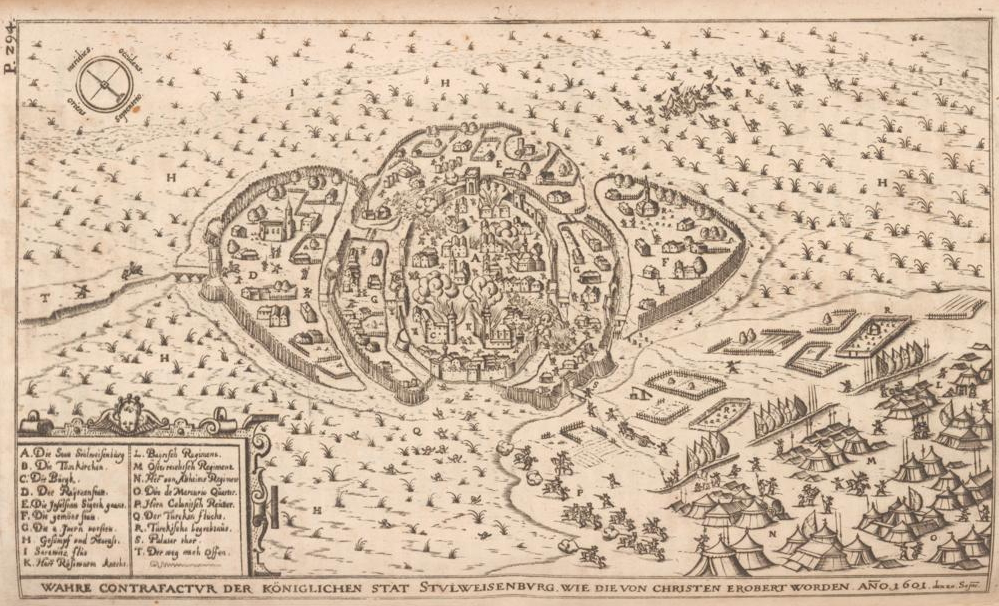
Johan Sibmacher's "True depiction of the royal city of S., as it was reconquered by the Christians" shows the basilica destroyed and burning and some more buildings on fire.

== See also ==
- Roman Catholicism in Hungary
- List of cathedrals in Hungary
