= Sophia of Hungary (nun) =

Sophia
- Born: c. 1135
- House: Árpád dynasty
- Father: Béla II of Hungary
- Mother: Helena of Rascia

Sophia (Hungarian: Zsófia) was the younger of the two daughters of King Béla II of Hungary. She was engaged to Henry, a son of Conrad III of Germany. She died as a nun in the Admont Abbey.

== Life ==
Sophia, as the first daughter of the royal couple, King Béla II and Helena of Rascia, was born around 1135. She first begins to appear in narrative texts in 1139, when her father betrothed her to Henry, the eldest son of Conrad III (r. 1138–1152). Soon after Sophia traveled westward from the Kingdom of Hungary to the Holy Roman Empire, where she was presumably to learn the German language and court customs in preparation for her marriage. However her engagement with the young Henry was broken.

Her father, Béla the Blind died in 1141, and the relationship between his successor, Géza II, and Conrad III grew increasingly strained during the following years. At one point in the mid-1140s, Conrad even briefly supported Boris Kalamanos, a rival candidate for the Hungarian throne. In this charged environment, the plans for a marriage between Sophia and Henry were abandoned. However, Sophia was still in the German kingdom, where she had been living for the past several years. Within a year she became a nun at the convent of Admont (today in Austria).

According to a 1159 writing by Herbord of Michelsberg, Sophia was already residing in the double monastery at Admont when her betrothal ended. Conrad III had sent her there immediately after she left Hungary, because the German king wanted her to be raised within the abbey until Sophia and Henry were old enough to wed. When it became clear that her marriage would never take place, her brother Géza II sent messengers to Admont to bring her back to Hungary. However Sophia did not want to leave, insisting instead that she wished to remain in the monastery as a nun. He then considered leading an army into Austria to take her back by force. Later, though, he decided to send a diplomatic mission to negotiate her return. The abbot of Admont gave Sophia the choice of staying or leaving. Once more, she affirmed her desire to become a nun, and Géza II finally permitted her to stay at Admont.

== Sources ==
- Kristó, Gyula; Makk, Ferenc (1996). Az Árpád-ház uralkodói [=Rulers of the House of Árpád] (in Hungarian). I.P.C. Könyvek. ISBN 963-7930-97-3.
- Lyon, Jonathan R. (2012). "The letters of Princess Sophia of Hungary, a nun at Admont". In Newman Goldy, Charlotte; Livingstone, Amy (eds.). Writing Medieval Women's Lives. Palgrave Macmillan. pp. 51–68. ISBN 978-0-230-11455-5.
- Makk, Ferenc (1989). The Árpáds and the Comneni: Political Relations between Hungary and Byzantium in the 12th century (Translated by György Novák). Akadémiai Kiadó. ISBN 963-05-5268-X.
