= Predslava of Kiev =

Princess of Kievan Rus' (born c. 1090)

- Born: c. 1090
- Spouse: Álmos
- Issue: Béla II
- House: Rurik
- Father: Sviatopolk II of Kiev
- Mother: Premyslid princess

Predslava of Kiev (fl. 1104–07) was a princess of Kievan Rus', the daughter of Sviatopolk II, the Grand Prince of Kiev (r. 1093–1113). She married Hungarian prince Álmos, with whom she had three children, one of whom was the later King of Hungary, Béla II (r. 1131–1141).

== Family ==
Predslava married Álmos on August 21, 1104. They had the following children:

- Adelaide, (c. 1107 – d. after 1140), married Sobieslav I of Bohemia in 1123.
- Béla II (c. 1109–1141), King of Hungary (r. 1131–1141).
- Hedwig, or Sophia (c. 1107–1138), married Margrave Adalbert II of Austria in 1132.
