= Barbara Komnena =

11th-century legendary figure in Russian historiography

Barbara Komnena (Russian: Варвара Комнина, romanized: Varvara Komnina) was, according to medieval Russian hagiographic legends, a daughter of the Byzantine emperor Alexios I Komnenos (reigned 1081–1118) who was married to the Grand Prince of Kiev Sviatopolk II Iziaslavich. No reference to her is found in Byzantine sources, which leads most modern researchers to the conclusion that her existence is purely legendary. The historical emperor Alexios I had four attested daughters: Anna, Maria, Eudokia and Theodora.

Barbara appears only in Russian hagiographic sources, including The Lives of Saints by Dimitry of Rostov, and also in The torment of St. the Great Martyr Barbara and the story of her glorious wonders by Theodosius Safonovich. Her story is related to the transfer of the relics of her holy patroness, Saint Barbara, from Constantinople to Kiev. The relics were said to have been given to Barbara as a dowry by her father. According to tradition, they were deposited by her in St. Michael's Golden-Domed Monastery, and later transferred to St. Volodimir's Cathedral.

Visiting Kiev in 1656, the Patriarch of Antioch, Macarios III Zaim, heard another legend about the transfer of the relics to Kiev in connection with the marriage of Princess Anna Porphyrogenita to Prince Vladimir the Great. However, it seems most likely that the actual transfer of Saint Barbara's relics to Kiev took place after the Mongol invasion of Rus' and during the decline of the Byzantine Empire.
