= Maria Komnene, Queen of Hungary =

Maria Komnene (c. 1144 – 1190) was Queen of Hungary and Croatia from 1163 until 1165. Maria's father was Isaac Komnenos (son of John II).

== Marriage ==
She married c. 1157 to King Stephen IV of Hungary (c. 1133 – 11 April 1165). They did not have any children.

== Sources ==
- Kristó Gyula - Makk Ferenc: Az Árpád-ház uralkodói (IPC Könyvek, 1996). ISBN 9789637930973.
- Korai Magyar Történeti Lexikon (9-14. század), főszerkesztő: Kristó Gyula, szerkesztők: Engel Pál és Makk Ferenc (Akadémiai Kiadó, Budapest, 1994)

Maria Komnene, Queen of Hungary Komnenos dynasty Born: c. 1144 Died: 1190
Royal titles
| Preceded by Agnes of Austria | Queen consort of Hungary; 1163–1165 | Succeeded by Agnes of Antioch |
