= King of Rama =

Hungarian royal title used to claim Bosnia

Banner used to symbolize Rama at Ferdinand II's coronation in 1618

King of Rama (Latin: Rex Ramae) was a title used by the monarchs of Hungary to provide a legal basis for their pretence of supremacy over Bosnia. The title refers to the river Rama, a small tributary of the Neretva. A state called Rama never existed; the title of King of Rama became incorporated into the royal style of the Hungarian monarchs due to some kind of misunderstanding.

King Béla II of Hungary adopted the title of King of Rama in 1137, after his army had reached the mountains of Bosnia though it did not actually gain any land. Béla II, as the new "King of Rama", appointed his second son, Ladislaus II, as Duke of Bosnia. Bosnia was administered by the ban, who was either an appointed or an elected official, and acted for the child-king Ladislaus. Hungary did succeed in asserting control over Bosnia and the Bosnian rulers were vassals of the Hungarian monarchs until the conquest of Bosnia by the Ottoman Empire. Between late 1463 and 1527 (when the kingdom itself fell to the Ottomans), Hungary controlled Jajce, the former capital of the Kingdom of Bosnia.

Since the reign of Béla II, all the kings and queens regnant of Hungary continued to claim supremacy over Bosnia. Thus, the title was in official use until 1918. In 1878, Bosnia and Herzegovina was occupied by Austria-Hungary and in 1908, it was annexed as a condominium, thereby giving the title a more practical significance than it had ever possessed.

== History ==
An examination into published charters of the Hungarian rulers it is observed that Rama is equivalent to Bosnia exclusively from the 15th century.

== See also ==
- King of Hungary
- List of rulers of Bosnia

== Bibliography ==
- Engel, Pál; Ayton, Andrew; Pálosfalvi, Tamás. The realm of St. Stephen: a history of medieval Hungary, 895-1526. I.B.Tauris, 2005. ISBN 1-85043-977-X
- Makk, Ferenc. The Árpáds and the Comneni: political relations between Hungary and Byzantium in the 12th century. Akadémiai Kiadó, 1989. ISBN 963-05-5268-X
