= Byzantine–Hungarian War (1127–1129) =

1127–1129 war

Date	Summer of 1127 – October 1129 – chronology uncertain
Location	Central Balkans, by the Danube
Result	Byzantine victory

Belligerents
Kingdom of Hungary; Grand Principality of Serbia	Byzantine Empire

Commanders and leaders
Stephen II; Setephel; Václav of Olomouc	John II Komnenos; Kourtikios; Andronikos Komnenos

Units involved
Hungarian army Serbian forces Bohemian forces "Frankish" mercenaries	Komnenian army Lombardian mercenaries Seljuk auxiliaries

A Byzantine–Hungarian War was fought between Byzantine and Hungarian forces on the Danube between 1127 and 1129. Byzantine primary sources, Cinnamus and Choniates, give little detail about this campaign; no dates are specified, and what they do say differs considerably.

== Differing chronologies and first campaign ==
The chronology presented here, 1127–1129, follows that of Michael Angold and other scholars, but John Fine has the events taking place earlier in 1125–1126.

According to the Byzantine chronicler Niketas Choniates, the citizens of the Byzantine town Braničevo "attacked and plundered the Hungarians who had come to" the Byzantine Empire "to trade, perpetrating the worst crimes against them." Around the same time, the blinded Hungarian pretender Álmos also fled to the Byzantine Empire, where Emperor John II Komnenos settled them in a town in Macedonia. The Byzantine John Kinnamos confirms that the emperor "regarded" Álmos "favorably and received him with kindness". He adds that king Stephen II of Hungary "sent his envoys to the emperor and demanded that" Álmos "be expelled from" the Byzantine Empire, but his request was rejected. The sources do not specify the date of Álmos's flee, but it seems to have occurred in about 1125. In addition, Stephen II received and sheltered those chieftains of the Pechenegs, who were defeated by the Byzantine Empire in 1122, which also increased the tension between the two realms.

Stephen II of Hungary broke into the empire in the summer of 1127. The king recruited 700 mercenaries from "Francia", who are well versed in the use of siege engines. His troops sacked Belgrade, Braničevo and Naissus, and plundered the regions around Serdica (Sofia, Bulgaria) and Philippopolis (Plovdiv, Bulgaria), before returning to Hungary. The Hungarian army tried to break the Byzantine defense line along the kingdom's southern border in the Balkans; the Hungarians transported the stones of Belgrade to strengthen the walls of Zimony (Zemun, Serbia), the Hungarian stronghold opposite it along the Danube.

Despite the fact that Álmos died in exile on 1 September 1127, the war continued between Hungary and the Byzantium. In response to Stephen's attack, Emperor John II Komnenos marched against Hungary in 1128 (with mercenaries from Lombardy and Seljuk auxiliaries) along with his river fleet, where he defeated the Hungarian royal troops in a battle at Haram, and "captured Frangochorion, the richest land in Hungary" (now in Serbia). Due to his illness, Stephen II stayed away from the campaign, thus his army was commanded by a certain Setephel during the siege. The Byzantines were victorious both on the river and on land. Many fleeing Hungarians were killed when a bridge across the stream Krassó broke under their weight.

Following his victory over the Hungarians John II launched a punitive raid against the Serbs. Dangerously for the Byzantines the Serbs had aligned themselves with Hungary. Many Serbian prisoners were taken, and these were transported to Nicomedia in Asia Minor to serve as military colonists. This was done partly to cow the Serbs into submission (Serbia was, at least nominally, a Byzantine protectorate), and partly to strengthen the Byzantine frontier in the east against the Turks. The Serbs were forced to acknowledge Byzantine suzerainty once again. In Hungary, the defeat at Haram undermined Stephen II's authority and he faced a serious revolt when two counts, named 'Bors' (possibly Boris Kalamanos) and 'Ivan', were declared kings. Both were eventually defeated, Ivan being beheaded and Bors fleeing to Byzantium. Stephen was unable to participate in any of the fighting because he was sick, recuperating in his homeland, according to John Kinnamos.

== Second campaign ==
John Kinnamos wrote of a second campaign by Stephen against the Byzantine Empire, when the Hungarian troops, supported by Bohemian reinforcements under the command of Duke Václav of Olomouc, took Braničevo by storm and destroyed its fortress. The returning John II convicted Kourtikios – leader of the Byzantine garrison – of a charge of high treason, despite that the commander did not abandon the besieged fort until its capture. Meanwhile, the Serbs also besieged and captured the fortress of Rhason (Ražanj, Serbia).

The Hungarians had renewed hostilities, possibly so that King Stephen could be seen to reassert his authority, by attacking the Byzantine frontier fortress of Braničevo, which was immediately rebuilt and fortified by John. The emperor was forced to retreat to the valley of Mlava river, but the advancing Hungarians defeated his army's rearguard at the strait of Ždrelo (called Evil Stair). The Hungarians obtained many spoils of war here. Further Byzantine military engagements – as Choniates mentions – resulted in a restoration of peace.

== Treaty ==
Cinnamus describes a Byzantine reverse occurring before peace was established, which suggests that the campaign was not entirely one-sided. Hungarian records, however, agree with Choniates in indicating that King Stephen was again defeated and was consequently forced to negotiate a peace on Byzantine terms.

Historian Ferenc Makk thinks that Emperor John II Komnenos was forced to retreat and sue for peace and that the treaty was signed in October 1129. The Byzantines were confirmed in their control of Braničevo, Belgrade, and Zemun and they also recovered the region of Syrmia (called Frangochorion in Choniates), which had been in Hungarian hands since the 1070s. The Hungarian pretender Álmos died in 1127, removing the major source of friction.

== Sources ==
=== Primary ===
- Choniates, Niketas; Magoulias, Harry J. (trans.) (1984). O City of Byzantium: Annals of Niketas Choniates. Detroit, Michigan: Wayne State University Press. ISBN 978-0-81-431764-8.
- Cinnamus, Ioannes (1976). Deeds of John and Manuel Comnenus. New York City and West Sussex, United Kingdom: Columbia University Press. ISBN 978-0-23-104080-8.

=== Secondary ===
- Angold, Michael (1984). The Byzantine Empire, 1025–1204: A Political History (First ed.). London and New York: Longman. ISBN 0-582-49060-X.
- B. Szabó, János (2013). Háborúban Bizánccal. Magyarország és a Balkán a 11–12. században [War with the Byzantium. Hungary and the Balkans in the 11–12th Century] (in Hungarian). Corvina. ISBN 978-963-13-6150-6.
- Bury, John Bagnell (1975). The Cambridge Medieval History: The Byzantine Empire. Byzantium and its Neighbours, Volume 4. Cambridge, United Kingdom: Cambridge University Press. ISBN 978-0-52-104535-3.
- Fine, John V. A. Jr. (1991) [1983]. The Early Medieval Balkans: A Critical Survey from the Sixth to the Late Twelfth Century. Ann Arbor: University of Michigan Press. ISBN 0-472-08149-7.
- Makk, Ferenc (1989). The Arpads and the Comneni: Political Relations between Hungary and Byzantium in the 12th Century. Budapest, Hungary: Akadémiai Kiadó. ISBN 978-9-63-055268-4.
- Ostrogorsky, George (1969), History of the Byzantine State, Rutgers University Press, ISBN 978-0-813-51198-6
- Skoulatos, Basile (1980). Les personnages byzantins de l'Alexiade: Analyse prosopographique et synthèse [The Byzantine Personalities of the Alexiad: Prosopographical Analysis and Synthesis] (in French). Louvain-la-Neuve and Louvain: Bureau du Recueil Collège Érasme and Éditions Nauwelaerts.
- Stephenson, Paul (2000). Byzantium's Balkan Frontier: A Political Study of the Northern Balkans, 900–1204. Cambridge: Cambridge University Press. ISBN 978-0-521-77017-0.
- Treadgold, Warren (1997). A History of the Byzantine State and Society. Stanford, California: Stanford University Press. ISBN 0-8047-2630-2.
- Varzos, Konstantinos (1984). Η Γενεαλογία των Κομνηνών [The Genealogy of the Komnenoi] (PDF) (in Greek). Vol. A1. Thessaloniki: Centre for Byzantine Studies, University of Thessaloniki.
- Živković, Tibor (2008). Forging unity: The South Slavs between East and West 550-1150. Belgrade: The Institute of History, Čigoja štampa.
