= Braničevo (Golubac) =

Braničevo Браничево
- Village
- Location within Serbia
- Coordinates: 44°42′18″N 21°32′18″E
- Country: Serbia
- District: Braničevo District
- Municipality: Golubac

Population (2002)
  - Total: 942
- Time zone: UTC+1 (CET)
  - Summer (DST): UTC+2 (CEST)

Braničevo is a village in the municipality of Golubac, Serbia. According to the 2002 census, the village has a population of 942 people. It lies on the river Pek.

Braničevo lies near the ruins of the Roman town of Viminacium, which was abandoned around 600. In the Middle Ages, it was the seat of an Orthodox bishopric and the site of a Byzantine fortress. It occupied a strategic position along the Via Militaris between Belgrade and Niš. In Greek, it was known as Branitzova (Βρανίτζοβα) or Branitza (Βρανίτζα).

By the 12th century, Braničevo was the centre of a doukaton (duchy) governed by a doux (duke). During the war of 1127–1129 against Hungary, the Hungarians razed the town. It was restored and resettled by the Byzantines in 1166. Béla III of Hungary occupied it in 1182, but turned it over as part of his daughter's dowry when she was betrothed to Emperor Isaac II in 1185. In July 1189, the German emperor Frederick Barbarossa passed through Braničevo on the Third Crusade. Western sources accuse the duke of Braničevo (dux de Brandicz) of treachery.

With the rise of the Second Bulgarian Empire and the Kingdom of Serbia, Byzantium's position in Braničevo became untenable. It finally slipped from their control in 1198. The region became a frequent object of contention between the Bulgars, Serbs, and Hungarians thereafter. Prince Lazar of Serbia captured it in 1378 or 1379, but it was lost to the Ottoman Empire in 1459.
