= Sviatopolk II of Kiev =

Grand Prince of Kiev from 1093 to 1113

Sviatopolk II
- Seal of Sviatopolk II

Grand Prince of Kiev
- Reign: 1093–1113
- Predecessor: Vsevolod I
- Successor: Vladimir II

Prince of Novgorod
- Reign: 1078–1088

Prince of Turov
- Reign: 1088–1093
- Born: 8 November 1050
- Died: 16 April 1113 (aged 62); Vyshgorod
- Burial: Golden-Roof Abbey, Kiev
- Spouse: Barbara (?), a Bohemian princess (daughter of Spytihnev II ?), Cuman princess Olena (Turkogan)
- Issue: Out of wedlock: Mstislav By his first wife: Iaroslav; Zbyslava; Predslava By his second wife: Anna; Maria; Bryachislav; Iziaslav
Names
- Sviatopolk Iziaslavovich (Mikhail)
- House: Rurik
- Father: Iziaslav I
- Mother: Gertrude of Poland

Sviatopolk II Iziaslavich (Old East Slavic: Свѧтополкъ Изѧславичь, romanized: Svętopolkǐ Izęslavičǐ; (Note: Russian: Святополк Изяславич, romanized: Svyatopolk Iziaslavich; Ukrainian: Святополк Ізяславич, romanized: Sviatopolk Iziaslavych) 8 November 1050 – 16 April 1113) was Grand Prince of Kiev from 1093 to 1113. He was not a popular prince, and his reign was marked by incessant rivalry with his cousin Vladimir Monomakh.

== Early life ==
Sviatopolk was the son of Iziaslav Iaroslavich by his concubine. During his brother Iaropolk's life, Sviatopolk was not regarded as a potential claimant to the throne of Kiev. In 1069 he was sent to Polotsk, a city briefly taken by his father from the local ruler Vseslav, and then he spent ten years (1078–88) ruling Novgorod. Upon his brother's death he succeeded him in Turov, which would remain in possession of his descendants until the 17th century.

== Reign ==
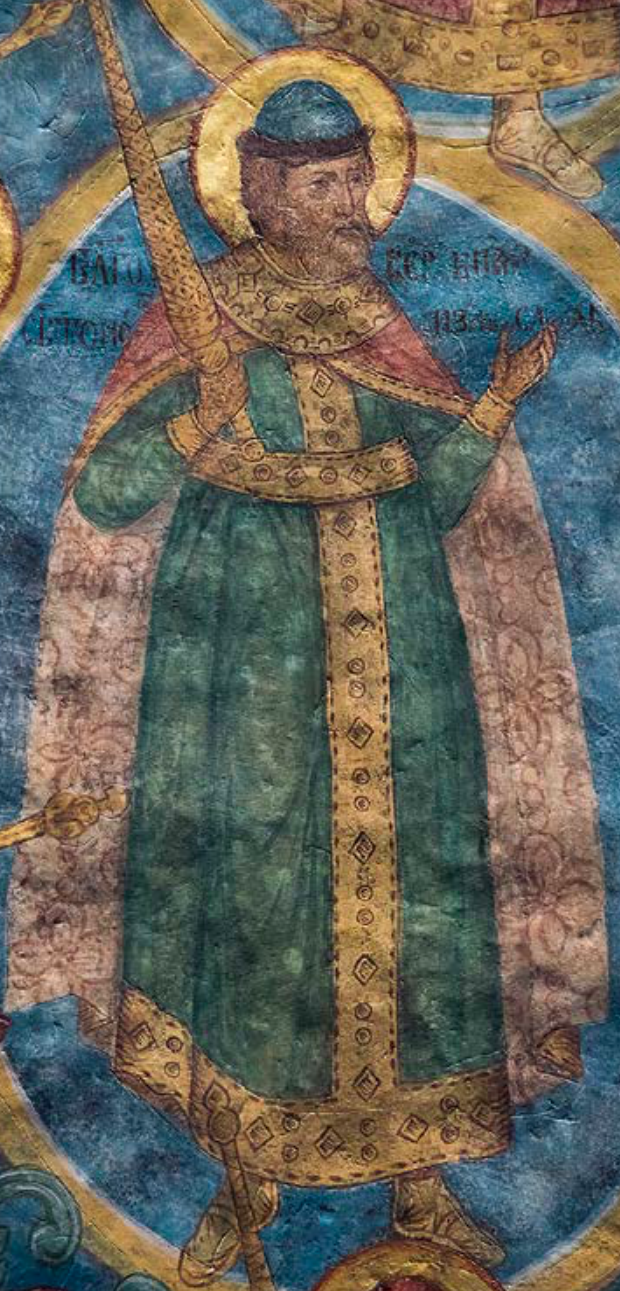
Portrait of Sviatopolk II from Novospassky Monastery

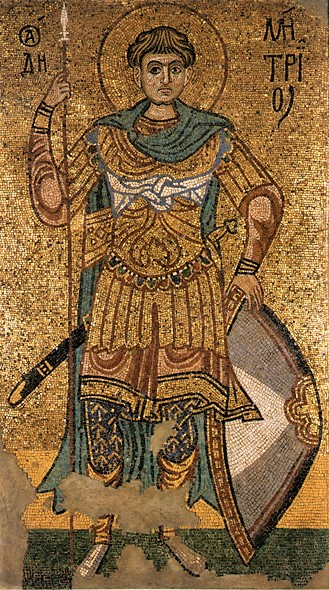
Mosaic of St. Demetrius was installed by Sviatopolk in the Kievan St. Michael's Golden-Domed Monastery to glorify the patron saint of his father.

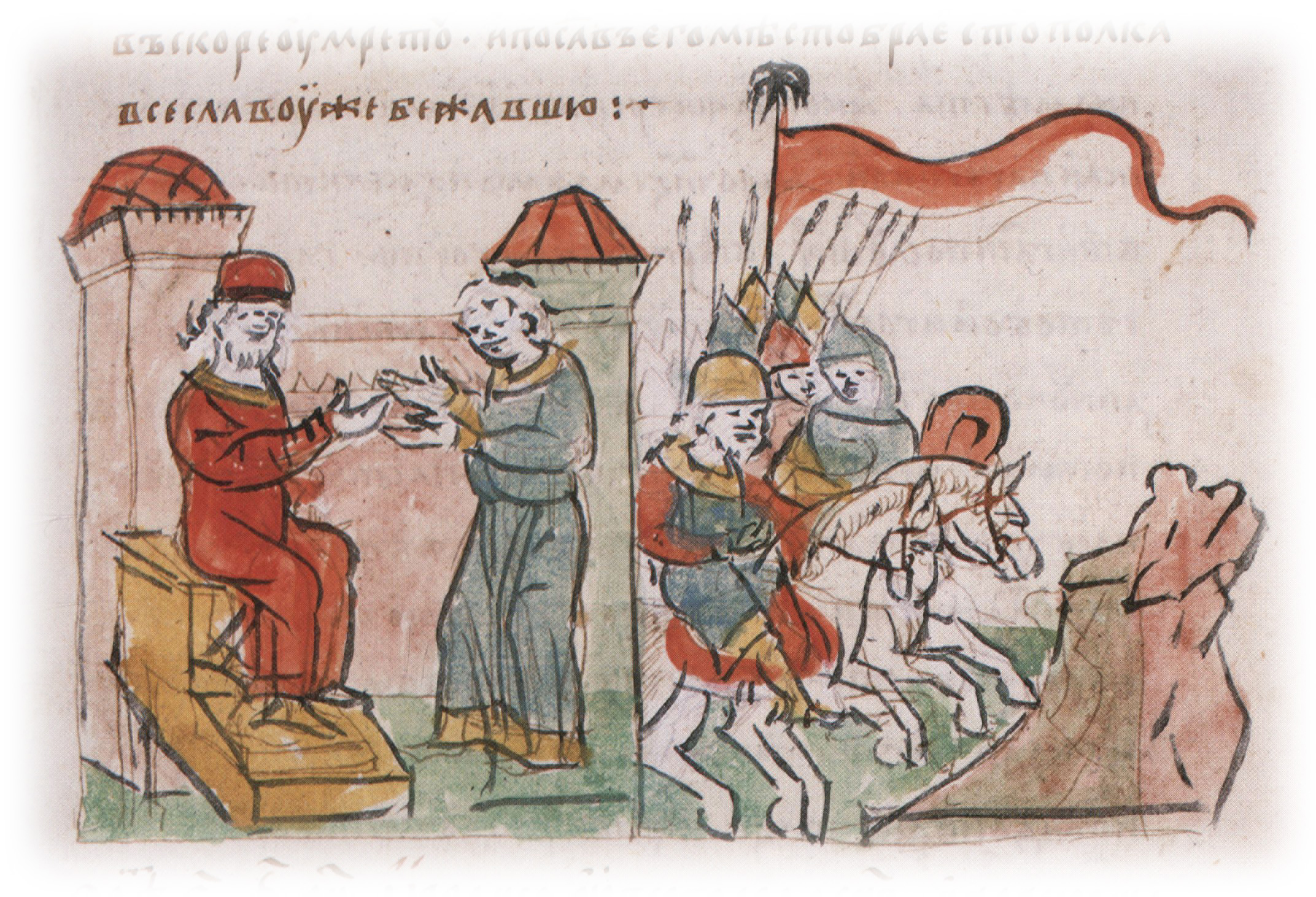
Sviatopolk (far left) in the Radziwiłł Chronicle

When Vsevolod Iaroslavich died in 1093, Sviatopolk was acknowledged by other princes as the senior son of the grand prince and permitted to ascend the Kievan throne. Although he participated in the princely congresses organized by Vladimir Monomakh, he is sometimes charged with encouraging internecine wars among Rurikid princes. For instance, he sided with his cousin David of Volhynia and his son-in-law Bolesław III Wrymouth in capturing and blinding one of the Galician princes. He also sided with Vladimir Monomakh in several campaigns against the Kipchaks but was defeated in the Battle of the Stugna River (1093). Later that year, Sviatopolk was again defeated when faced with the Kipchaks, whereupon the latter destroyed Torchesk, an Oghuz Turk settlement.

In 1096, in an attempt to force Oleg I of Chernigov into a Rus compact, Sviatopolk left his lands undefended. His father-in-law, Tugorkhan, raided Pereyaslavl, while Boniak, a Cuman khan, raided as far as Kiev, destroying Berestovo and sacking the three monasteries of Klov, Vydubichi, and the Kiev Monastery of the Caves. Tugorkhan was killed during his raid on Pereiaslavl, and so Sviatopolk had him buried in Kiev.

In 1111, Sviatopolk, alongside Vladimir II, led an army at the Battle of the Salnytsia River, where they defeated a Cuman army on the Salnytsia river. The site of this battle is probably at modern-day Izium.

Sviatopolk's Christian name was Michael, so he encouraged embellishment of St Michael's Abbey in Kiev, which has been known as the Golden-Roofed up to the present. The history now known as the Primary Chronicle was compiled by the monk Nestor during Sviatopolk's reign.

== Marriage and children ==
Sviatopolk married firstly a Bohemian princess (Přemyslid dynasty), probably a daughter of Duke Spytihněv II. They had three children:

1. Zbyslava, married to king Boleslaw III of Poland on November 15, 1102.
2. Predslava, married to Prince Álmos of Hungary on August 21, 1104. Her fate is less known.
3. Iaroslav (died 1123), Prince of Volynia and Turov was married three times - to the Hungarian-Polish Sophia (daughter of Władysław I Herman and his second wife Judith of Swabia), and Kievan princesses. In consequence of Iaroslav's early death, his descendants forfeited any right to the Kievan throne and had to content themselves with Turov and Pinsk.

Secondly, in 1094 Sviatopolk married a daughter of Tugorkhan of the Kypchaks, Olena. They had four children:

1. Anna (died 1136), married to Sviatoslav Davydych from Chernihiv who took monastic vows upon her death and later became Saint Nikolai Svyatoslav Davydych of Chernihiv.
2. Maria, married Piotr Włostowic, castellan of Wrocław and Polish palatine.
3. Bryachislav (1104–1127), possibly dethroned Iaroslav as the Prince of Turov (1118–1123) in 1118.
4. Iziaslav (died 1127), possibly the Prince of Turov in 1123.

In 1104, Sviatopolk would marry for a third time to Barbara Komnena.

Some sources claim Sviatopolk had an out-of-wedlock son, Mstislav, who ruled Novgorod-Seversk from 1095 to 1097 and later Volyn (1097–1099). Mstislav later was murdered in Volodymyr-Volynski.

== Sources ==
- Dmytryshyn, Basil (2000). Medieval Russia: A Source Book, 850-1700. Academic International Press.
- Franklin, Simon; Shepard, Jonathan (2013). The Emergence of Rus 750-1200. Routledge.
- Raffensperger, Christian (2012). Reimagining Europe. Harvard University Press.
- Vernadsky, George (1976). Kievan Russia. Yale University Press.

Sviatopolk II Iziaslavich Rurik Born: 1050 Died: 1113
Regnal titles
| Preceded by Mstislav Iziaslavich | Prince of Polotsk; 1069–1071 | Succeeded by Vseslav Briacheslavich |
| Preceded by Gleb Sviatoslavich | Prince of Novgorod; 1078–1088 | Succeeded by Mstislav Vladimirovich |
| Preceded by Yaropolk Iziaslavich | Prince of Turov; 1088–1093 | Succeeded by Viacheslav Iaropolkovich |
| Preceded by Vsevolod I | Grand Prince of Kiev; 1093–1113 | Succeeded by Vladimir II Monomakh |
