= Prince Álmos =

Duke of Hungary, Croatia and Nyitra (c.1070–1127)

Álmos
- Duke of Hungary, Croatia and Nyitra
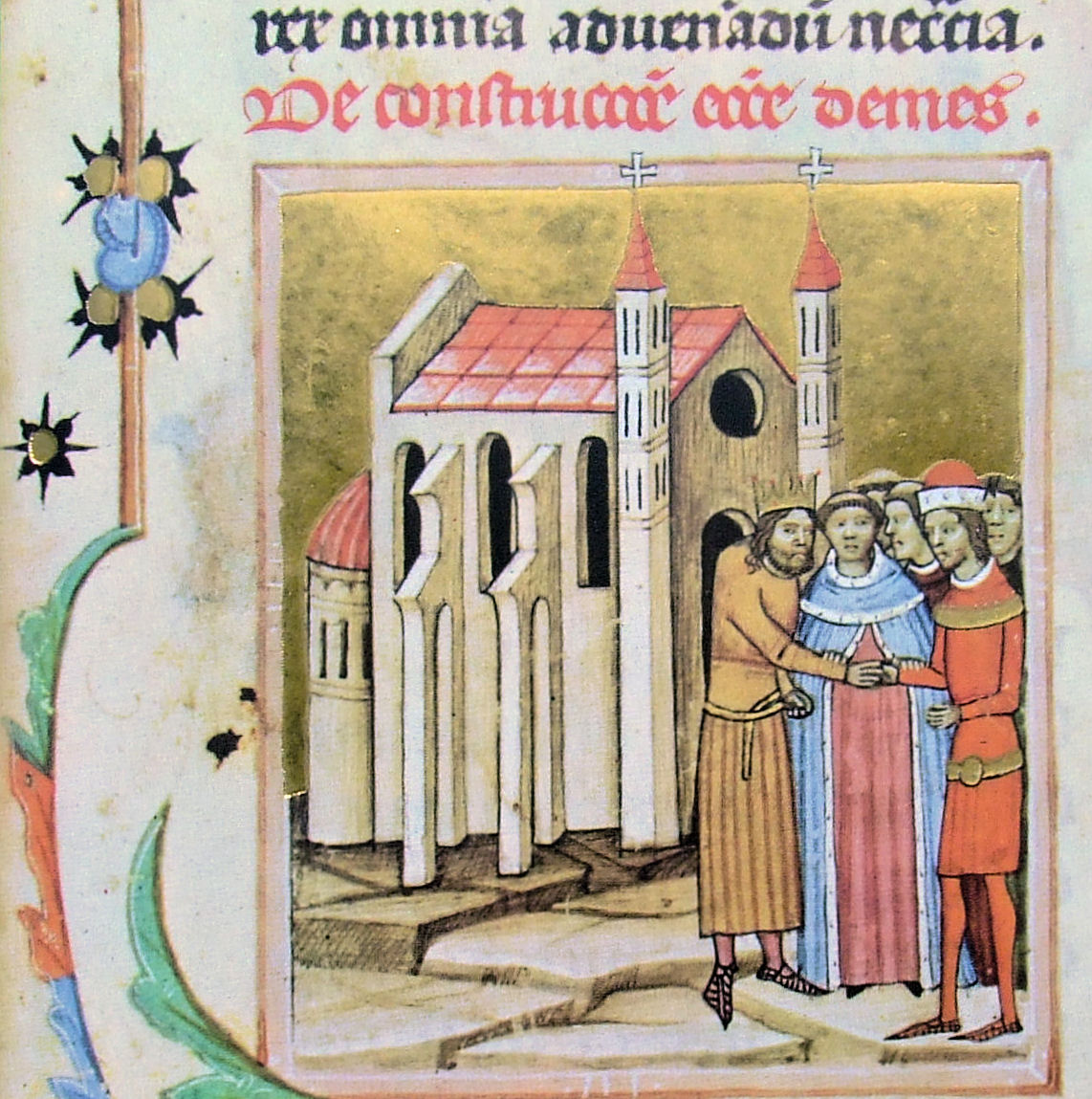
- Reconciliation of Kálmán and Álmos (Illuminated Chronicle).
- Born: c. 1070; Kingdom of Hungary
- Died: 1 September 1127 (aged 56–57); Constantinople, Byzantine Empire
- Spouse: Predslava of Kiev
- Issue: Adelaide, Duchess of Bohemia; Béla II, King of Hungary; Hedwig, Margravine of Austria
- House: House of Árpád
- Father: Géza I of Hungary
- Mother: Sophia

Álmos (also "Almus", Slovak, Croatian: Almoš; c. 1070 or 1075 – 1 September 1127) was a Hungarian prince, the son of King Géza I of Hungary and brother of King Coloman. He held several governmental posts in the Kingdom of Hungary.

== Life ==
=== Early life ===
Álmos was the younger of the two sons surviving infancy of the future King Géza I. His mother seems to have been his father's first wife, Sophia, because Géza's Byzantine second wife—whose baptismal name is unknown—returned to her homeland after her husband's death. Both Álmos and his older brother, Coloman, were born around 1070, according to the historians Gyula Kristó and Márta Font.

Géza I who ascended the throne in 1074 died on 25 April 1077. He was succeeded by his brother, Ladislaus I, because Coloman and Álmos were still minors. The new king decided that Coloman should be prepared for a career in the Church. The king's decision was unusual, as Coloman was older than Álmos.

Between 1084 and 1091 Álmos was the duke of Slavonia; between 1091 and 1095 he was named duke of Croatia. According to the Illuminated Chronicle both Coloman and Álmos accompanied their uncle on a military campaign against Bohemia in the spring of 1095. Before reaching the border of his kingdom, Ladislaus I "was overcome by a grave infirmity" and decided to appoint Álmos as his heir. However, Coloman did not agree with his uncle's decision, deciding to flee to Poland.

=== Conflicts with Coloman ===
Coloman returned after King Ladislaus had died to claim his rights. According to the Illuminated Chronicle, it was his uncle who had invited him back from Poland. The same source adds that Álmos "in the true simplicity of his heart honoured his brother, Coloman, and yielded to him the crown of the kingdom", which suggests that Coloman ascended the throne without bloodshed. On the other hand, he was only crowned king in early 1096, implying that the two brothers had been fighting for the crown before they reached an agreement. Coloman was crowned in Székesfehérvár by Archbishop Seraphin of Esztergom. According to the Illuminated Chronicle, at the same time he "granted the dukedom with full rights" to Álmos. This report shows that Álmos only acknowledged his brother's rule in exchange for receiving the one-time ducatus or duchy of their father and grandfather, which encompassed one-third of the kingdom.

After Coloman's victories over the marauding crusaders in 1096, Henry IV, Holy Roman Emperor, whom Ladislaus I had supported against Pope Urban II in his last years, wrote a letter to Duke Álmos. He stated that Coloman had "neglected" his "interests because of his own necessities" and asked Álmos to intervene on his behalf at Coloman. However, the king—a former bishop—did not continue his predecessor's foreign policy and joined the pope's camp. Historian Gyula Kristó writes that the fact that his brother, Álmos had for years had a close relationship with Emperor Henry may also have influenced Coloman's decision.

Coloman invaded Croatia and participated himself in the campaign in 1097. Taking advantage of Coloman's absence, Álmos began to conspire against the king and mustered his armies. Coloman returned from Croatia and marched towards his brother's duchy with his troops in 1098. The two armies encountered at Tiszavárkony, only the river Tisza separated them. However, the commanders of the two troops started negotiations and decided not to fight against each other, compelling Coloman and Álmos to make a peace.

[Coloman] and his army marched to [Tiszavárkony] against [Álmos], and [Álmos] drew near to [Tiszavárkony] from the opposite direction, and between them was the river [Tisza]. But loyal Hungarians sought to bring about a truce, in order that they could talk with each other, and they said: "Why do we fight? If they defeat us in battle, we shall die; and if they escape, they will flee: in times past our fathers fought against each other and brothers against brothers, and they died. Nor do we see any ground for fighting. Let those two fight if fighting pleases them; and whichever of them shall win, let us take as lord." Having taken this decision, the chief men dispersed. When Grak told [Coloman] of their decision and Ilia informed [Álmos], they kept the peace, though it was not by their own will.

— The Hungarian Illuminated Chronicle

==== Final confrontation ====
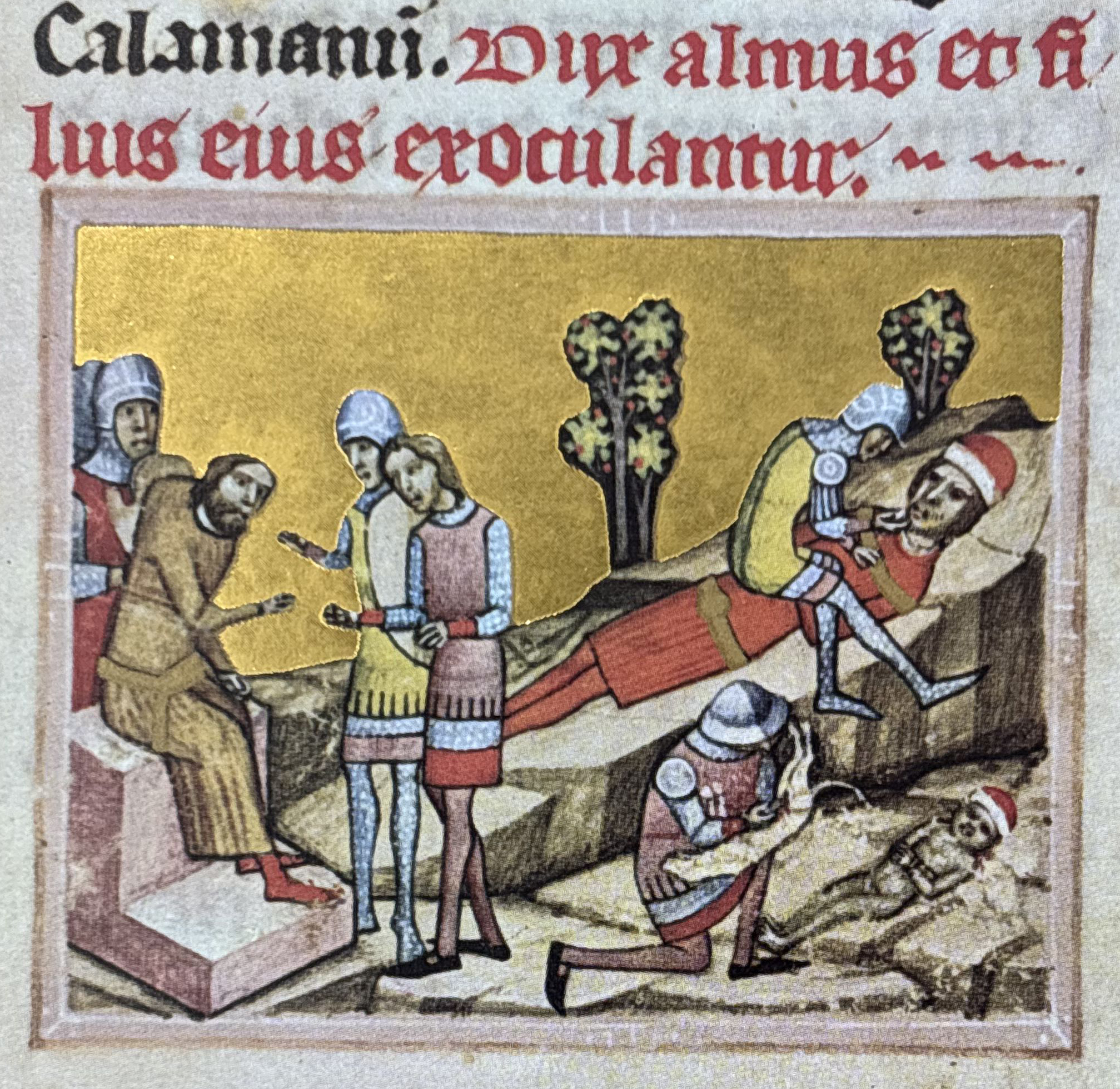
Álmos and his son, Béla are blinded on Coloman's order (from the Illuminated Chronicle)

The conflict was renewed a few years later between the two brothers, when Coloman had his four-year-old son, Stephen, crowned in 1105, which resulted in the open rebellion of Álmos. The duke left Hungary and sought the assistance of Emperor Henry IV against the king. However, he realized that the emperor, who was facing a rebellion of his own son, could not help him. Álmos returned to Hungary in 1106, but soon fled to his brother-in-law, Boleslaw III of Poland. With Polish assistance, he took the fortress of Abaújvár in Hungary. As a result, Coloman had a meeting with Boleslaw III and the two monarchs "vowed perpetual friendship and brotherhood". Without the Polish monarch's support Álmos was forced to yield to Coloman.

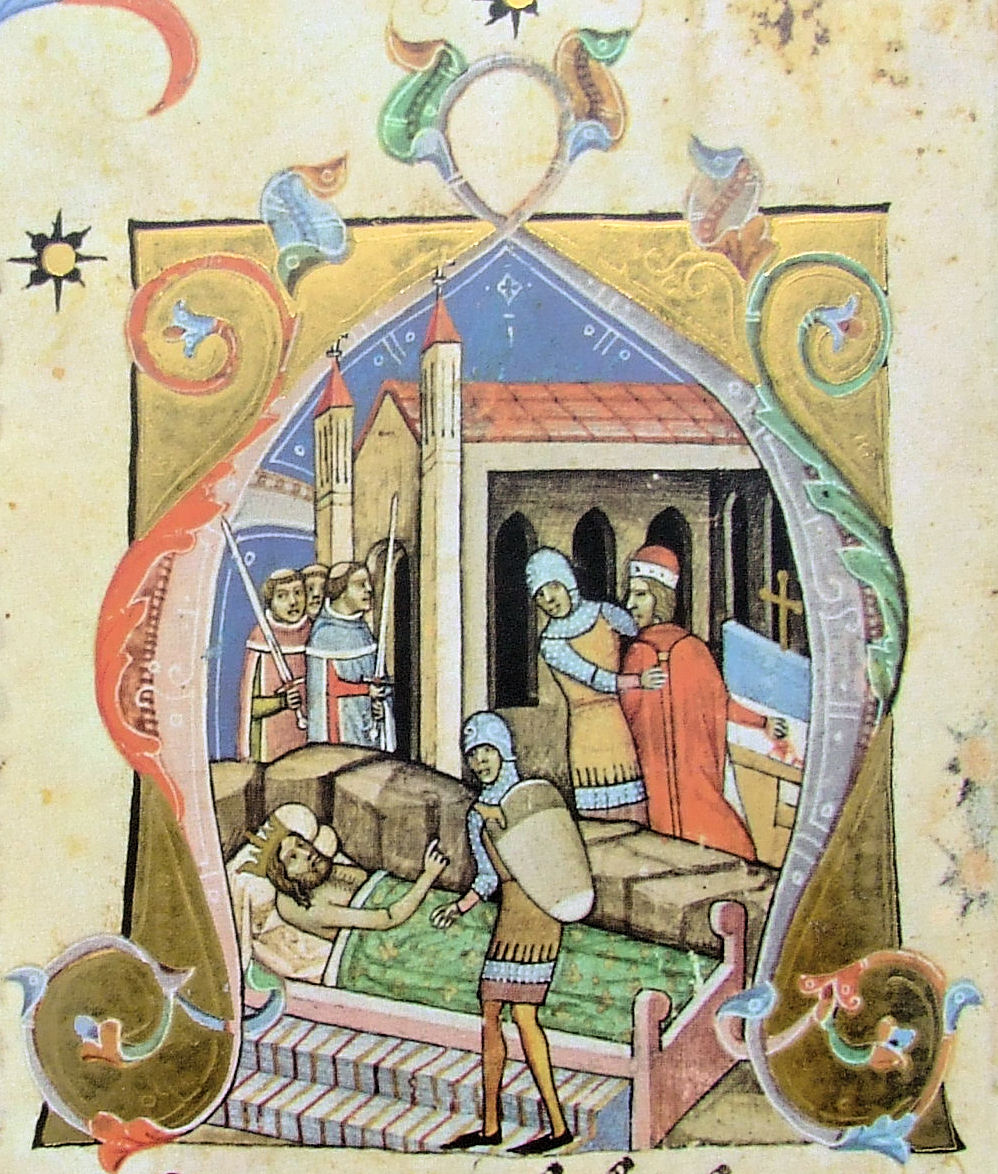
Coloman had the blind Álmos imprisoned before his death (from the Illuminated Chronicle)

King Coloman decided to take advantage of the absence of Álmos—who had made a pilgrimage to the Holy Land—and seized his duchy in 1107 or 1108. Although Álmos was allowed to keep his own private property, the annexation of his duchy ensured the integrity of Coloman's kingdom. Having returned from the Holy Land, Álmos decided to set up a monastery at Dömös. On the occasion of its consecration, where Coloman was also present, Álmos was—falsely, according to the Illuminated Chronicle—accused of an assassination attempt on the monarch. Coloman decided to have his brother arrested, but "the most reverend bishops and other well-disposed dignitaries" intervened on Álmos's behalf and "thus reconciliation was solemnly sworn" between the king and his brother.

Álmos left for Passau. Upon his request, Henry V of Germany invaded Hungary and laid siege to Pressburg (Bratislava, Slovakia) in September 1108. At the same time, Duke Svatopluk of Bohemia, who also supported Álmos, made an incursion into the regions north of the Danube. However, Coloman's ally, Boleslaw III invaded Bohemia, forcing the Czech duke to withdraw. Although the emperor's attempt to take Pressburg was also a total failure, he could persuade Coloman to forgive his rebellious brother, who thus return to Hungary.

Coloman discovered that Álmos was again conspiring to seize the throne. Having lost his patience, Coloman had Álmos and Álmos's young son, Béla, blinded in order to secure a peaceful succession for his own son. On the same occasion, many of his brother's partisans were likewise mutilated. After this Álmos went on to live in seclusion at the monastery of Dömös. Coloman died in 1116. His son, Stephen was crowned king in Székesfehérvár in the month of his father's death. His peaceful succession proves that the safety measures Coloman had implemented to prevent Álmos from aspiring the throne were effective.

=== Exile ===
According to the Illuminated Chronicle, the blind Álmos, "fearing death at the hands of King Stephen", fled to the Byzantine Empire. Many of his partisans followed him and Emperor John II Komnenos settled them in a town in Macedonia. There, Álmos received a new name from the Emperor, Constantine. The Byzantine John Kinnamos confirms that the emperor "regarded" Álmos "favorably and received him with kindness". He adds that king Stephen II "sent his envoys to the emperor and demanded that" Álmos "be expelled from" the Byzantine Empire, but his request was rejected. The sources do not specify the date of Álmos's flight, but it seems to have occurred in about 1125. Historian Ferenc Makk writes that Álmos was forced to flee from Hungary, because he had taken advantage of Stephen's failures in Volhynia and Dalmatia and conspired against Stephen. His departure resulted a war between the two realms, lasting from 1127 to 1129. Álmos died in exile on 1 September 1127.

His son Béla the Blind would succeed as king of Hungary in 1131. The duke's remains were returned to Hungary in 1137.

== Family ==
Ancestors of Prince Álmos

16. Michael
8. Vazul
4. Béla I of Hungary
9. A lady of the Tátony clan
2. Géza I of Hungary
20. Boleslav I of Poland
10. Mieszko II Lambert of Poland
21. Emnilda
5. Richeza or Adelaide of Poland
22. Ezzo of Lotharingia
11. Richeza of Lotharingia
23. Matilda of Germany
1. Prince Álmos
3. Sophia

On August 21, 1104, Álmos married Predslava of Kiev, and had the following children:

- Adelaide, (c. 1107 – 1140), married Sobieslav I of Bohemia in 1123
- Béla II, King of Hungary (r. 1131–1141). In 1129, he married Helena of Raška (Rascia) and together they had at least six children.
- Hedwig, or Sophia (1107–1138), married Duke Adalbert of Austria in 1132

== Sources ==
=== Primary sources ===
- Deeds of John and Manuel Comnenus by John Kinnamos (Translated by Charles M. Brand) (1976). Columbia University Press. ISBN 0-231-04080-6.
- The Deeds of the Princes of the Poles (Translated and annotated by Paul W. Knoll and Frank Schaer with a preface by Thomas N. Bisson) (2003). CEU Press. ISBN 963-9241-40-7.
- The Hungarian Illuminated Chronicle: Chronica de Gestis Hungarorum (Edited by Dezső Dercsényi) (1970). Corvina, Taplinger Publishing. ISBN 0-8008-4015-1.
- "The letters of Henry IV: Henry thanks Duke Almus for his support and promises him a reward" (2000). In Imperial Lives & Letters of the Eleventh Century (Translated by Theodor E. Mommsen and Karl F. Morrison, with a historical introduction and new suggested readings by Karl F. Morrison, edited by Robert L. Benson). Columbia University Press. pp. 52–100. ISBN 978-0-231-12121-7.

=== Secondary sources ===
- Bartl, Július (January 2002). Slovak History: Chronology & Lexicon. Bolchazy-Carducci Publishers. ISBN 978-0-86516-444-4.
- Engel, Pál (2001). The Realm of St Stephen: A History of Medieval Hungary, 895–1526. I.B. Tauris Publishers. ISBN 1-86064-061-3.
- Fine, John V. A. Jr. (1991) [1983]. The Early Medieval Balkans: A Critical Survey from the Sixth to the Late Twelfth Century. Ann Arbor: University of Michigan Press. ISBN 0-472-08149-7.
- Font, Márta (2001). Koloman the Learned, King of Hungary (Supervised by Gyula Kristó, Translated by Monika Miklán). Márta Font (supported by the Publication Commission of the Faculty of Humanities of the University of Pécs). ISBN 963-482-521-4.
- Kontler, László (1999). Millennium in Central Europe: A History of Hungary. Atlantisz Publishing House. ISBN 963-9165-37-9.
- Kristó, Gyula; Makk, Ferenc (1996). Az Árpád-ház uralkodói [=Rulers of the House of Árpád] (in Hungarian). I.P.C. Könyvek. ISBN 963-7930-97-3.
- Makk, Ferenc (1989). The Árpáds and the Comneni: Political Relations between Hungary and Byzantium in the 12th century (Translated by György Novák). Akadémiai Kiadó. ISBN 963-05-5268-X.
- Manteuffel, Tadeusz (1982). The Formation of the Polish State: The Period of Ducal Rule, 963–1194 (Translated and with an Introduction by Andrew Gorski). Wayne State University Press. ISBN 0-8143-1682-4.
- Prinzing, Günter; Salamon, Maciej; Stephenson, Paul (2001). Byzantium and East Central Europe. Universitas.
- Steinhübel, Ján (2021). The Nitrian Principality: The Beginnings of Medieval Slovakia. Brill. ISBN 978-90-04-43863-7.
- Stephenson, Paul (2000). Byzantium's Balkan Frontier: A Political Study of the Northern Balkans, 900–1204. Cambridge University Press. ISBN 978-0-521-02756-4.
- Wiszewski, Przemysław (2010). Domus Bolezlai: Values and Social Identity in Dynastic Traditions of Medieval Poland (c. 966–1138). Brill. ISBN 978-90-04-18142-7.

Prince Álmos House of Árpád Born: c. 1070 Died: 1 September 1127
Regnal titles
Preceded by Stephen II	Duke of Croatia for Ladislaus I 1091–1095	Succeeded by Petar Snačić
Preceded by Lampert	Duke of Nyitra; 1095–1108	Succeeded by Last creation
Preceded by Demetrius Zvonimir	Duke of Slavonia; 1084–1091	Succeeded by ?
