= 1044 =

1044 in various calendars
- Gregorian calendar: 1044; MXLIV
- Ab urbe condita: 1797
- Armenian calendar: 493; ԹՎ ՆՂԳ
- Assyrian calendar: 5794
- Balinese saka calendar: 965–966
- Bengali calendar: 450–451
- Berber calendar: 1994
- English Regnal year: N/A
- Buddhist calendar: 1588
- Burmese calendar: 406
- Byzantine calendar: 6552–6553
- Chinese calendar: 癸未年 (Water Goat); 3741 or 3534 — to — 甲申年 (Wood Monkey); 3742 or 3535
- Coptic calendar: 760–761
- Discordian calendar: 2210
- Ethiopian calendar: 1036–1037
- Hebrew calendar: 4804–4805
- Hindu calendars
- Vikram Samvat: 1100–1101
- Shaka Samvat: 965–966
- Kali Yuga: 4144–4145
- Holocene calendar: 11044
- Igbo calendar: 44–45
- Iranian calendar: 422–423
- Islamic calendar: 435–436
- Japanese calendar: Chōkyū 5 / Kantoku 1 (寛徳元年)
- Javanese calendar: 947–948
- Julian calendar: 1044; MXLIV
- Korean calendar: 3377
- Minguo calendar: 868 before ROC 民前868年
- Nanakshahi calendar: −424
- Seleucid era: 1355/1356 AG
- Thai solar calendar: 1586–1587
- Tibetan calendar: ཆུ་མོ་ལུག་ལོ་ (female Water-Sheep); 1170 or 789 or 17 — to — ཤིང་ཕོ་སྤྲེ་ལོ་ (male Wood-Monkey); 1171 or 790 or 18

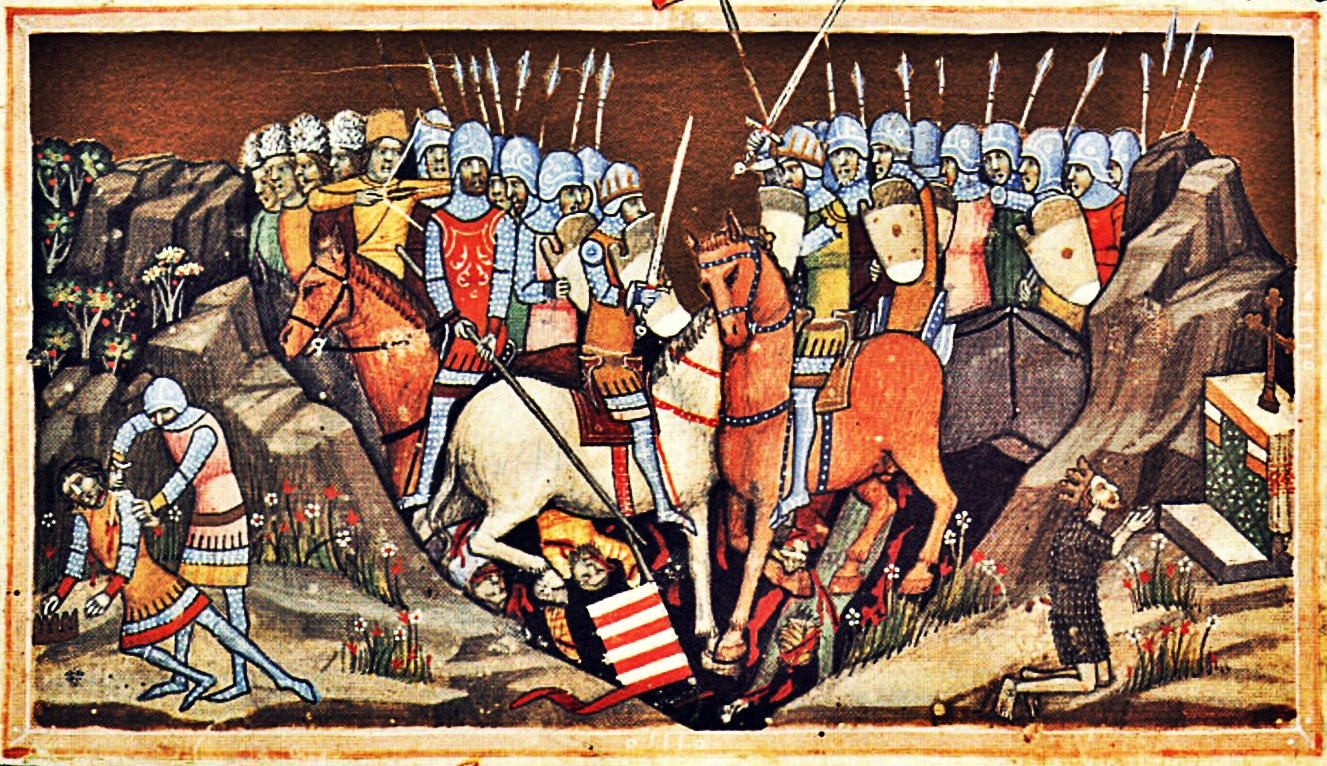
Battle of Ménfő, in the corner (left) the depiction of the killing of Samuel Aba.

Year 1044 (MXLIV) was a leap year starting on Sunday of the Julian calendar.

== Events ==
=== By place ===
==== Europe ====
- July 6 – Battle of Ménfő: German troops under King Henry III ("the Black") defeat the Hungarian army, led by King Samuel Aba, who flees the field but is captured and killed. Peter Orseolo ("the Venetian") becomes (for the second time) king of Hungary, and a vassal of the Holy Roman Empire.
- Summer – Geoffrey II ("the Hammer"), count of Anjou, captures the city of Tours, and takes control of the county of Touraine.

==== Asia ====
- The Chinese military treatise of the Wujing Zongyao is written and compiled by scholars Zeng Gongliang (曾公亮), Ding Du (丁度), and Yang Weide (楊惟德), during the Song dynasty. It is the first book in history to include formulas for gunpowder, and its use for various bombs (thrown by sling or trebuchet catapult). It also describes the double-piston pump flamethrower and a thermoremanence compass, a few decades before Shen Kuo wrote of the first known magnetic mariner's compass. Although emphasizing the importance of many weapons, it reserves high respect for the crossbow, and the ability of crossbowmen to fell charging units of nomadic cavalrymen.
- August 11 – King Anawrahta seizes the throne of the Pagan Empire at Bagan in Burma (modern Myanmar).

=== By topic ===
==== Religion ====
- September – A second Roman uprising forces Pope Benedict IX out of Rome. He is succeeded by the new elected (anti)-Pope Sylvester III (until 1045).

== Births ==
- Trahaearn ap Caradog, Welsh king of Gwynedd (d. 1081)
- Approximate date
  - Abelard of Hauteville, Italo-Norman nobleman (d. 1081)
  - Władysław I Herman, duke of Poland (d. 1102)

== Deaths ==
- January 14 – Adelaide I, abbess of Quedlinburg
- February 13 – Zhao Yuanyan, Chinese prince of the Song dynasty (b. 985)
- April 19 – Gothelo I (or Gozelo), duke of Lorraine
- July 6 – Samuel Aba, palatine and king of Hungary
- August 11 – Sokkate, last king of the Pagan Kingdom, killed in combat (b. 1001)
- November 14 – Thietmar of Hildesheim, German bishop
- Abu'l-Husayn al-Basri, Mu'tazilite faqih and theologian
- Rajendra Chola I, emperor of the Chola dynasty
- Sharif al-Murtaza, Buyid Shia scholar (b. 965)
