= Peter, King of Hungary =

King of Hungary (r. 1038–1041, 1044–1046)

Peter
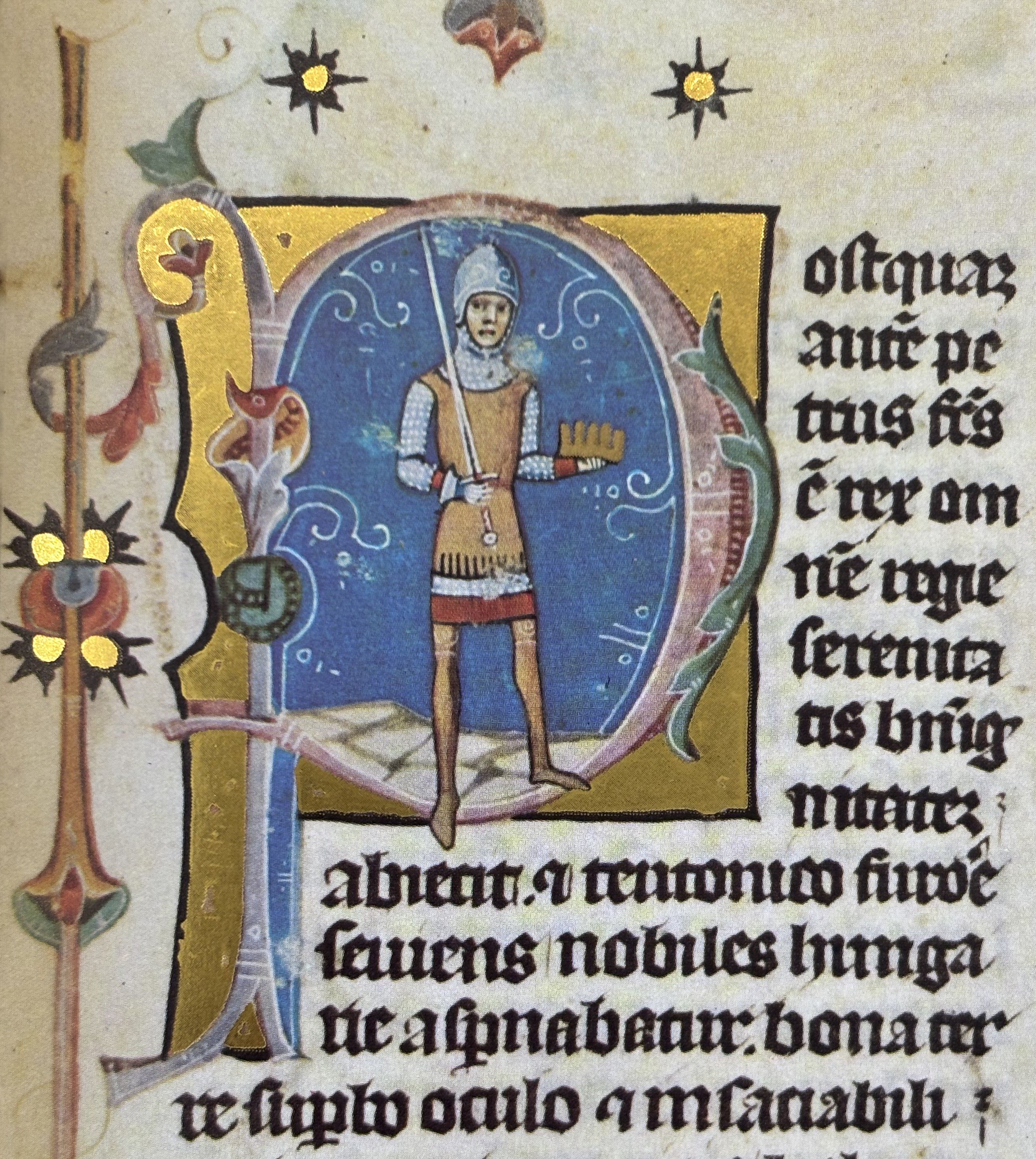
- From the Illuminated Chronicle

King of Hungary
- Reign: 15 August 1038 – September 1041
- Coronation: 1038, Székesfehérvár
- Predecessor: Stephen I
- Successor: Samuel
- Reign: 5 July 1044 – 30 August 1046
- Predecessor: Samuel
- Successor: Andrew I
- Born: Pietro Orseolo; 1011; Venice
- Died: 30 August 1046 or 1059 (aged 35 or 48); Székesfehérvár, Hungary
- Burial: Sts. Peter and Paul Cathedral, Pécs
- Spouse: According to Cosmas : Judith of Schweinfurt (m. 1055–1058)
- House: Orseolo
- Father: Otto Orseolo
- Mother: Grimelda of Hungary
- Religion: Chalcedonian Christianity

Peter (Hungarian: Velencei Péter, Croatian: Petar iz Venecije, Slovak: Peter z Benátok, Italian: Pietro di Venezia; 1010 or 1011 – 1046, or late 1050s), born Pietro Orseolo and known as Peter the Venetian, was King of Hungary twice. He first succeeded his uncle, King Stephen I, in 1038. His favoritism towards his foreign courtiers caused an uprising which ended with his 1041 deposition. Peter was restored in 1044 by Henry III, Holy Roman Emperor. He accepted the Emperor's suzerainty during his second reign, which ended in 1046 after a pagan uprising. Hungarian chronicles are unanimous that Peter was executed by order of his successor, Andrew I, but the chronicler Cosmas of Prague's reference to his alleged marriage around 1055 suggests that he may also have survived his second deposition.

== Life ==
=== Before 1038 ===
Peter Orseolo was born in Venice, the only son of Doge Otto Orseolo. His mother Grimelda was a sister of Stephen I, the first King of Hungary; historian Gyula Kristó suggests that he was born in 1010 or 1011. The Venetians rose up and deposed Otto Orseolo in 1026. Peter did not follow his father, who fled to the Byzantine court in Constantinople; he instead went to Hungary, where his uncle appointed him commander of the royal army.

Emeric, Stephen's only son to survive infancy, died in an accident in 1031. Stephen's cousin Vazul had the strongest claim to the throne, but the King overlooked him and named Peter as his heir. On Stephen's order, Vazul was blinded shortly thereafter and his three sons – Levente, Andrew and Béla – exiled, which strengthened Peter's right of succession. The King asked Peter to take an oath respecting the property of his wife, Queen Giselle, suggesting that Peter's relationship with his aunt was tense.

=== First rule (1038–1041) ===
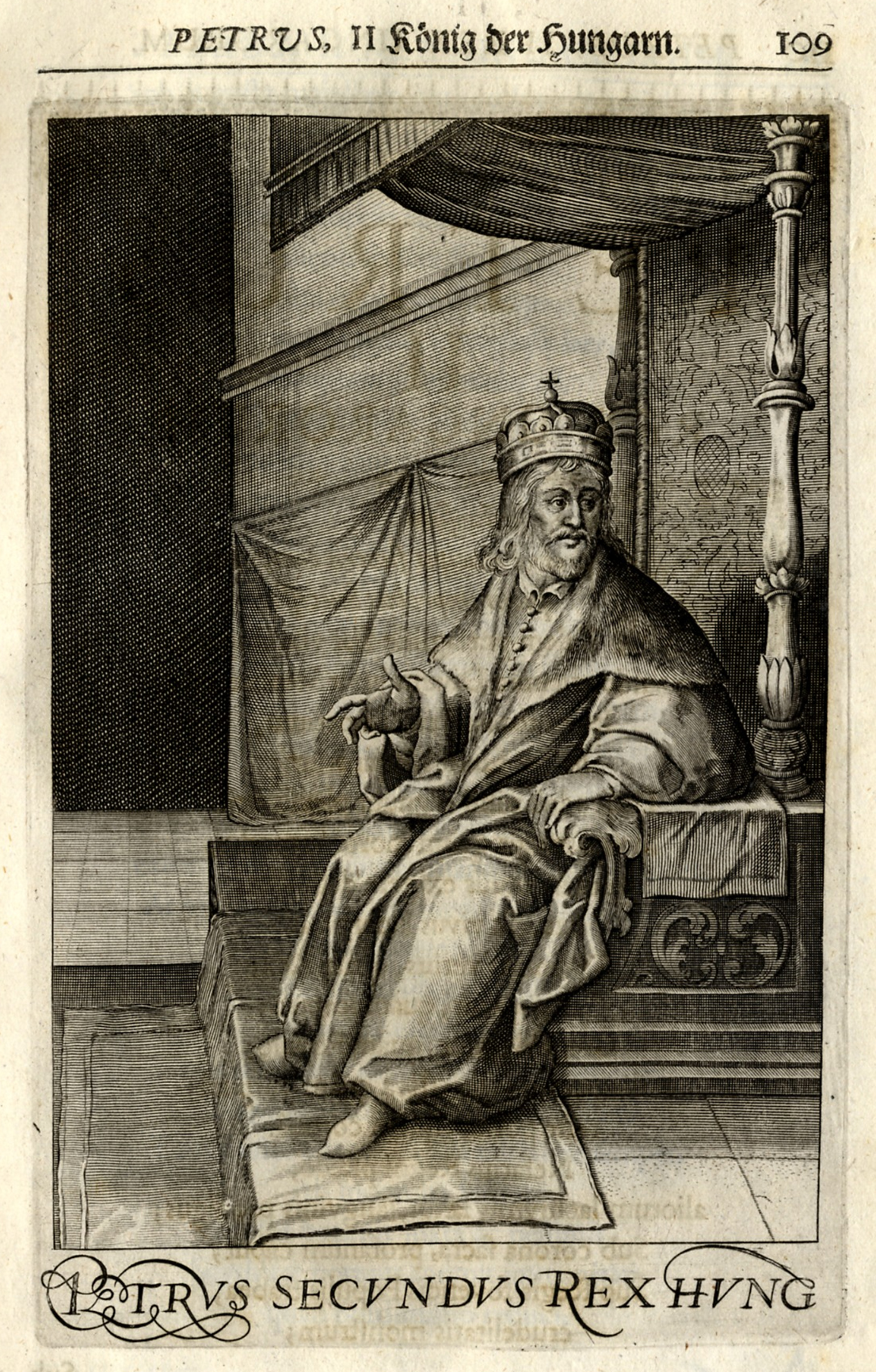
Peter, King of Hungary (Nádasdy Mausoleum, 1664)

Peter succeeded King Stephen I, who died on 15 August 1038, and adopted an active foreign policy. Hungarian troops plundered Bavaria in 1039 and 1040, and invaded Bohemia in 1040 to assist Duke Bretislav I against Holy Roman Emperor Henry III. Hungarian chronicles recount that Peter preferred the company of Germans ("who roared like wild beasts") and Italians ("who chattered and twittered like swallows"), which made him unpopular among his subjects. He introduced new taxes, seized Church revenue and deposed two bishops.

Audaciously, Peter confiscated Queen Giselle's property and took her into custody. She sought help from Hungarian lords, who blamed one of Peter's favorites (Budo) for the monarch's misdeeds and demanded that Budo be put on trial. When the King refused, the lords seized and murdered his unpopular advisor and deposed the monarch in 1041. They elected a new king, Samuel Aba, who was a brother-in-law or another nephew of King Stephen I.

As soon as he began to rule, Peter threw aside every trace of the forbearance befitting a monarch's majesty, and in consort with Germans and Latins raged with Teutonic fury, treating the nobles of the kingdom with contempt and devouring the wealth of the land "with a proud eye and an insatiable heart." Fortifications, castles, and every office in the kingdom was taken away from the Hungarians and given to Germans or Latins. In addition, Peter was extremely debauched, and his hangers-on behaved with shameful and unbridled lust, violently assaulting the wives and daughters of the Hungarians wherever the king travelled. No one at the time could feel sure of the chastity of his wife or daughter in the face of the importunity of Peter's courtiers.

— Simon of Kéza: The Deeds of the Hungarians

=== Exile (1041–1044) ===
Peter first fled to Austria, seeking the protection of his brother-in-law, Margrave Adalbert. He approached Emperor Henry III for help against Samuel Aba. The new Hungarian monarch invaded Austria in February 1042, but Adalbert routed Aba's troops. Henry III launched his first expedition against Hungary in early 1042. His forces advanced north of the Danube to the river Garam (Hron, Slovakia). The Emperor planned to restore Peter, but the locals were strongly opposed. Accordingly, the Emperor appointed another (unnamed) member of the Hungarian royal family to administer the territories.

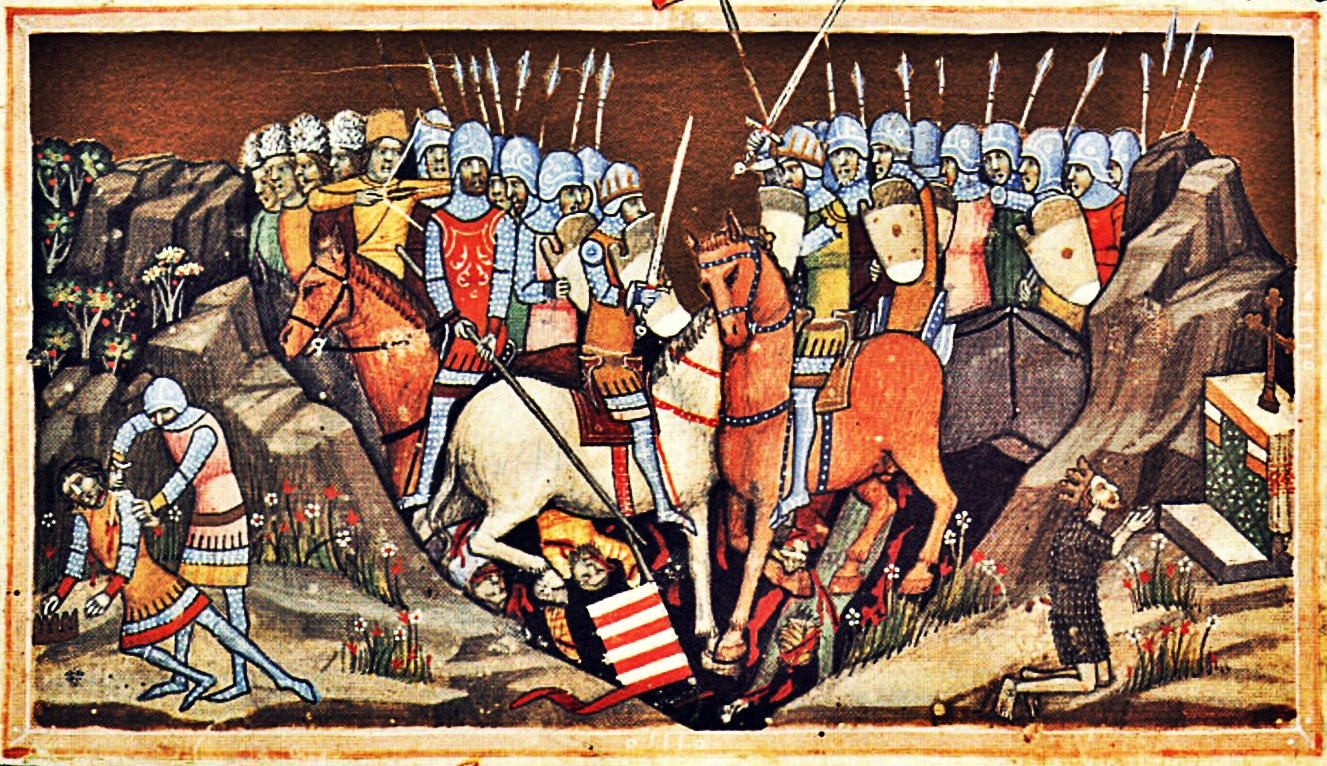
The 1044 Battle of Ménfő

In the autumn King Henry also invaded Hungary, destroyed Hainburg and Pressburg and either laid waste or received the surrender of the northern region of the Danube as far as the River Gran, because rivers and marshes protected the southern region. Part of the army twice encountered attacking Hungarians and wrought great slaughter. After the subjection of the Hungarians of that territory, since they refused to accept Peter, he installed for them as duke one of their number who was at that time in exile among the Bohemians.

— Hermann of Reichenau: Chronicle

The Emperor returned to Hungary in the early summer of 1044, and was joined in his advance by many Hungarian lords. The decisive battle was fought on 5 June at Ménfő (near Győr), where Samuel Aba's forces were defeated. Although Aba escaped from the battlefield, Peter's supporters soon captured and killed him.

=== Second rule (1044–1046) ===
Following Samuel Aba's death, Emperor Henry entered Székesfehérvár and restored Peter. Peter introduced Bavarian law in his realm, which suggests that Hungary became an imperial fief. He accepted the Emperor's suzerainty on Whitsun 1045, giving his royal lance to his overlord (who returned to Hungary). A number of plots to overthrow Peter indicate that he remained unpopular. Two of King Stephen I's maternal cousins (Bolya and Bonyha) conspired against Peter in 1045, but the King had them arrested, tortured and executed. Bishop Gerard of Csanád invited Vazul's exiled sons to the country. An uprising by pagan commoners ended Peter's second rule in 1046. Peter planned to flee again to the Holy Roman Empire, but Vazul's son Andrew (who had returned to Hungary) invited him to a meeting at Székesfehérvár. The deposed king soon realised that Andrew's envoys actually wanted to arrest him. He fled to a fortified manor at Zámoly, but his opponent's supporters seized it and captured him three days later. All 14th-century Hungarian chronicles attest that Peter was blinded, which caused his death. However, the near-contemporary Cosmas of Prague relates that Judith of Schweinfurt, widow of Duke Bretislaus I of Bohemia who was expelled by her son, fled to Hungary and married Peter about 1055 "as an insult to" her son "and all the Czechs". If the latter report is reliable, Peter survived the ordeal and died during the late 1050s. He was buried in the cathedral of Pécs. His original tomb was excavated in June 2019.

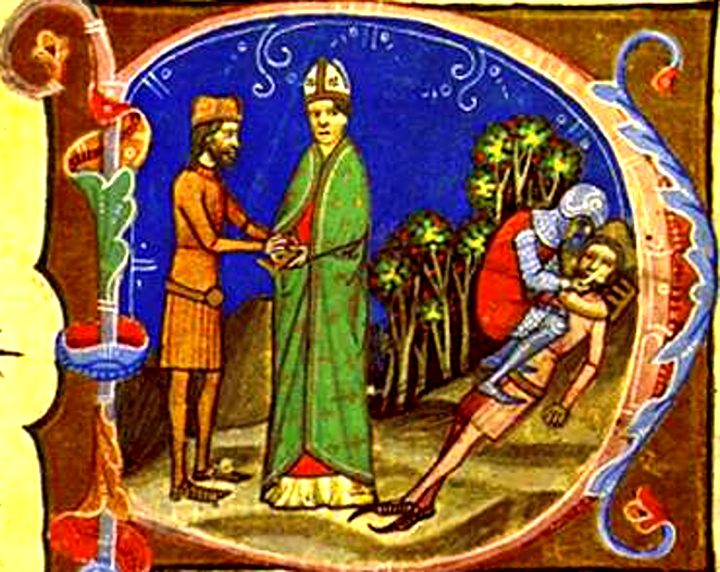
The blinding of Peter, as depicted in the Illuminated Chronicle

The following autumn the Hungarians remembered their former treachery and set up a certain Andreas as their king. They killed the many foreigners who had fought for King Peter; they inflicted various injuries on him and his wife and finally they deprived Peter of his eyes and sent him, together with his wife, to be kept in a certain place. At the same time many foreigners in that country were despoiled, exiled and killed.

— Hermann of Reichenau: Chronicle

King Peter, seeing that the Hungarians had with one mind taken the part of Dukes Andreas and Levente, took flight with his [Germans] towards Musun, intending to cross from there into Austria, but he could not escape. For the Hungarians had been beforehand and had occupied the gateways and egresses of the kingdom; moreover the ambassador of Duke Andreas called King Peter back under the pretext of wishing to come to a peaceable and honourable agreement with him. Believing him, King Peter returned [...]. When he turned aside to the village of Zamur, the aforesaid ambassador wished to take him in an ambush and to bring him bound to Duke Andreas; but having knowledge of this, Peter took refuge in a mansion and defended himself bravely for three days. At last all his soldiers were killed by arrows and he himself was taken alive; he was blinded and brought to Alba, where in great pain he soon ended his life.

— Illuminated Chronicle

== Family ==
The name and family of Peter's wife are unknown, but Gyula Kristó suggests that she was of German origin. Historians debate the validity of Cosmas of Prague's report of Peter's second marriage to the widowed Judith of Schweinfurt. Lisa Wolverton, the chronicle's translator, says that Cosmas misinterpreted his sources (which describe the marriage of Judith of Swabia to King Solomon of Hungary). On the other hand, Kristó writes that Cosmas's report may suggest that Peter survived his blinding. The following family tree presents Peter the Venetian's ancestors and his relatives who are mentioned in the article:

Gyula of Transylvania	Taksony	a "Cuman" woman*
Pietro II Orseolo	Sarolt	Géza	Michael
Otto Orseolo	Grimelda of Hungary	Stephen I of Hungary	Giselle of Bavaria	two daughters	unknown	Samuel Aba**	Vazul
Peter the Venetian	Emeric	Levente	Andrew	Béla

*A Khazar, Pecheneg or Volga Bulgarian woman.
**Samuel Aba might have been Géza's grandson instead of his son-in-law.

== See also ==
- Vata pagan uprising

== Sources ==
=== Primary sources ===
- Herman of Reichenau: Chronicle. In: Eleventh-century Germany: The Swabian Chronicles (selected sources translated and annotated with an introduction by I. S. Robinson) (2008); Manchester University Press; ISBN 978-0-7190-7734-0.
- Cosmas of Prague: The Chronicle of the Czechs (Translated with an introduction and notes by Lisa Wolverton) (2009). The Catholic University of America Press. ISBN 978-0-8132-1570-9.
- Simon of Kéza: The Deeds of the Hungarians (Edited and translated by László Veszprémy and Frank Schaer with a study by Jenő Szűcs) (1999). CEU Press. ISBN 963-9116-31-9.
- The Hungarian Illuminated Chronicle: Chronica de Gestis Hungarorum (Edited by Dezső Dercsényi) (1970). Corvina, Taplinger Publishing. ISBN 0-8008-4015-1.

=== Secondary sources ===
- Bartl, Július; Čičaj, Viliam; Kohútova, Mária; Letz, Róbert; Segeš, Vladimír; Škvarna, Dušan (2002). Slovak History: Chronology & Lexicon. Bolchazy-Carducci Publishers, Slovenské Pedegogické Nakladatel'stvo. ISBN 0-86516-444-4.
- Engel, Pál (2001). The Realm of St Stephen: A History of Medieval Hungary, 895–1526. I.B. Tauris Publishers. ISBN 1-86064-061-3.
- Kontler, László (1999). Millennium in Central Europe: A History of Hungary. Atlantisz Publishing House. ISBN 963-9165-37-9.
- Kristó, Gyula; Makk, Ferenc (1996). Az Árpád-ház uralkodói [Rulers of the House of Árpád] (in Hungarian). I.P.C. Könyvek. ISBN 963-7930-97-3.
- Kristó, Gyula (2003). Háborúk és hadviselés az Árpád-korban [Wars and Warfare under the Árpáds] (in Hungarian). Szukits Könyvkiadó. ISBN 963-9441-87-2.
- Makk, Ferenc (1993). Magyar külpolitika (896–1196) [Hungarian Foreign Policy (896–1196)] (in Hungarian). Szegedi Középkorász Műhely. ISBN 963-04-2913-6.
- Molnár, Miklós (2001). A Concise History of Hungary. Cambridge University Press. ISBN 978-0-521-66736-4.
- Nicol, Donald M. (1988). Byzantium and Venice: A Study in Diplomatic and Cultural Relations. Cambridge: Cambridge University Press. ISBN 0-521-34157-4.

Peter, King of Hungary House of Orseolo Born: 1010 or 1011 Died: 1046 or late 1050s
Regnal titles
Preceded by Stephen I	King of Hungary; 1038–1041	Succeeded by Samuel
Preceded by Samuel	King of Hungary; 1044–1046	Succeeded by Andrew I
