= Illuminated Chronicle =

14th-century Hungarian illustrated chronicle

Illuminated Chronicle Chronicle of the Deeds of the Hungarians
- The first page of the Illuminated Chronicle. King Louis I on the throne, below the Hungarian Anjou and the Hungarian coat of arms.
- Author: Mark of Kalt
- Illustrator: Miklόs Meggyesi
- Language: Latin
- Subjects: History of the Hungarians
- Genre: Chronicle
- Published: 1358
- Publication place: Kingdom of Hungary
- Media type: Illuminated manuscript
- Pages: 146

The Illuminated Chronicle or Chronicon Pictum (Hungarian: Képes Krónika, German: Ungarische Bilderchronik) is a medieval illustrated chronicle from the Kingdom of Hungary from the 14th century. It represents the artistic style of the royal court of King Louis I of Hungary. The codex is a unique source of art, medieval and cultural history.

In the prologue, the author calls his work as Chronica de gestis Hungarorum, meaning "Chronicle of the Deeds of the Hungarians".

== History of the chronicle ==
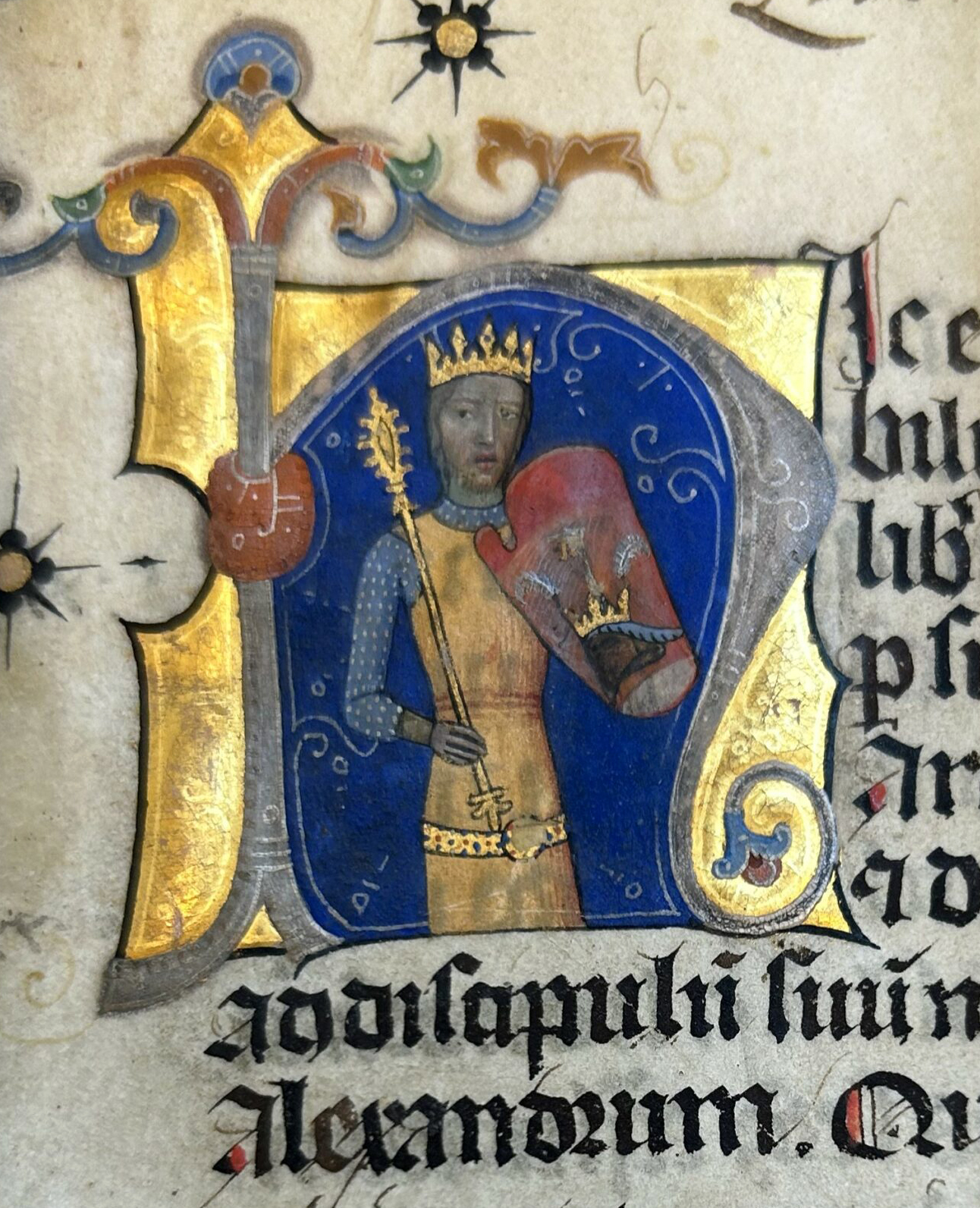
King Louis the Great as depicted in the Secretum Secretorum (Secret of Secrets)

The Illuminated Chronicle was commissioned by King Louis I Hungary and probably completed not long after 1358. The codex was written and illuminated in and after 1358, but no later than 1370, in the Hungarian royal court. King Louis I commissioned the Chronicon Pictum and the Secretum Secretorum, which were both produced in a Hungarian workshop. Miklόs Meggyesi, son of Hertul the court painter of Louis, has traditionally been identified as the illuminator, though there is no real evidence for this. The Illuminated Chronicle was written by Mark of Kalt (Latin: Marci de Kalt, Hungarian: Kálti Márk) in 1358 in Latin.

According to historian Bálint Hóman, the original source of all extant Hungarian chronicles was the lost Gesta Ungarorum, which was written in the time of King Saint Ladislaus of Hungary (reigned 1077–1095). The basic premise of the Hungarian medieval chronicle tradition states that the Huns, i.e. the Hungarians, came out twice from the regions of Scythia, the guiding principle being the Hun-Hungarian continuity.

The chronicle was given by the Hungarian king Louis I to the French king Charles V, when the daughter of Louis, Catherine, was engaged to Charles's son Louis I, Duke of Orléans in 1374. The chronicle was later given to Serbian despot Đurađ Branković as a gift from the French king Charles VII. The chronicle was then copied in 1462. Between 1458 and 1490, it was kept in Hungary, in the court of King Matthias Corvinus. It was later lost, possibly spending some time in the possession of the Ottomans. There is evidence to suggest that in the second half of the 15th century the chronicle was again in Hungary, as it contains several handwritten Hungarian and Latin entries from the period. In three places researchers also found Turkish writing which make various comments regarding Hungary. Because of this, the researchers concluded that sometime between the 15th and 17th century the manuscript was owned by a Hungarian who knew Turkish very well. The chronicle may have been present in Vienna during the infamous Ottoman siege of the 16th century as from at least the 17th century, it belonged to the royal archives in Vienna. Sebastian Tengnagel mentions it in the manuscript catalog of the court library from 1608 to 1636, which is why it is sometimes referred to as the Vienna Illuminated Chronicle. As a result of the Venice Cultural Convention, the chronicle was returned to Hungary in 1934. The manuscript is now kept in the National Széchényi Library in Budapest, Hungary.

== Illuminations ==
The 147 pictures of the chronicle represent a large source of information on medieval Hungarian cultural history, costume and court life, they're also the most important records extent of Hungarian painting practices in the 14th century. The artistic value is quite high, and the characters are drawn with detail and by artists with a knowledge of anatomy. The chronicle contains 147 miniatures: 10 larger images, 29 images in columns, smaller images painted in medallion shapes at the bottom of 4 pages, 99 images enclosed in initials, and 5 initials without images. In addition, there are 82 pieces of ornamental art painted in the margins.

The images are listed in the same order as their appearance in the chronicle.

Page	Illumination	Description
Page 1	King Louis on the Throne King Louis on the Throne	King Louis on the Throne; King Louis I of Hungary is seated in the centre on an elevated throne decorated with mosaics, a canopy, and pinnacles, wearing a crown on his head. He wears white gloves and holds a sceptre in his right hand and an orb in his left. His reddish-brown striped robe is covered by a mantle lined with ermine. To his right stands a group of knights in Western attire and armour, carrying swords and shields, while on his left a group of figures in Eastern dress can be seen. The long-robed figures are armed with bows, arrows, and sabres. These weapons are depicted as royal insignia according to Eastern custom. Saint Catherine of Alexandria; In the initial "A", the attributes of Saint Catherine of Alexandria are depicted: a palm branch and a broken wheel. The royal couple, King Louis I and his wife, Queen Elizabeth, are shown kneeling in prayer before the saint. Christ; In the initial "P", Christ is depicted raising His right hand in blessing and holding a book in His left, referring to the biblical text: "By me kings reign". Coats of Arms of the Hungarian Ruler; The coats of arms and helmet crest of Louis I of Hungary: the Hungarian Angevin coat of arms, the Hungarian double-cross coat of arms, and the gold-crowned helmet bearing the Angevin crest: an ostrich head holding a golden horseshoe in its beak, positioned between two ostrich feathers. (The three emblems were also the royal insignia of King Charles Robert of Hungary.
Page 2	The Historiographer	The Historiographer; Mark of Kalt, the author of the Illuminated Chronicle. The robe worn by the storyteller in the image is not strictly monastic in appearance, but more ornate, as it is decorated with a gold border. A bearded man sits in front of a mosaic-decorated lectern, writing in a codex. He holds a writing instrument in his right hand, while his left hand presses down the sheet of parchment with a knife. His ink pots are attached to the edge of the lectern. In the year of our Lord 1358, on Tuesday, in the octave of the Ascension of that same Lord of ours, I began this chronicle concerning the ancient and most recent deeds of the Hungarians, their origins and growth, their triumphs and bravery... — Mark of Kalt, Illuminated Chronicle
Page 4	The Miraculous Deer	Raiding and Hunting Warriors; In a rocky, wooded landscape, three groups of warriors are depicted. At the center, two warriors hunt a bear with the aid of dogs and long spears, while armed men standing on either side of the scene scan the distance. The illustration evokes the chronicle's account of Scythia, which, according to the text, was explored by the Huns, the ancestors of the Hungarians, through "subtle cunning" and was renowned for its forests, abundant vegetation, and diverse wildlife.
Page 5	The Miraculous Deer	The Miraculous Stag; The hunt for the Miraculous Stag. A hunting party accompanied by dogs is depicted, with a prominent leader in the foreground, identified as Hunor or Magor. In the left background, a forest can be seen, toward which a hind is moving. The beginning of the spreading of the Hungarians in the eastern parts of Scythia: It came to pass that one day they set out to hunt. In a deserted wilderness, a hind suddenly appeared before them, and they pursued it as it fled into the Maeotian marshes. — Mark of Kalt, Illuminated Chronicle
Page 7	The First Arrival of the Hungarians in Pannonia	The First Arrival of the Hungarians in Pannonia; Castles and residential towers standing on mountain peaks are visible in the background. The Huns, considered by the chronicle to be the ancestors of the Hungarians, are shown entering from the right in the foreground: armoured horsemen, among them a richly dressed leader figure. One of the warriors holds in his right hand a flag extending beyond the frame of the image, bearing the Turul, the legendary bird of the Hungarians. The miniaturist depicts it as a black bird resembling a falcon or eagle on a red background. In the center, men and women follow them, carrying sack-like bundles and children on their backs. Behind them, women and children travel in wagons covered with tarpaulins, followed by warriors riding camels, who bring up the rear of the procession. In the year 373 of the incarnation of the Lord, in the time of the Emperor Valens and Celestine I, pope of the Roman Church, in the sixth age of the world, the Huns dwelling in Scythia had greatly increased in number. They gathered together and appointed captains from among themselves... From the hundred and eight kindreds they selected ten times a hundred thousand armed warriors, that is, ten thousand from each kindred. The rest of the Huns they left behind in Scythia to guard their dwelling places and their kingdom against their enemies. They also chose one judge from among themselves, Kádár by name, of the kindred of Torda, to settle the suits of those who were at variance and to punish thieves, robbers, and evildoers. Yet this was subject to the condition that, if the judge should pronounce an unjust sentence, the community might declare it void, and it might depose the judge who had erred, as well as the captains, whenever it wished. This lawful custom was observed by the Huns, that is, by the Hungarians, until the time of Prince Géza, son of Taksony. For before the Hungarians were baptized, the herald's voice would summon the Huns to arms throughout their encampments in these words: "By the word of God and of the whole community, let every man, armed or as he is, appear without fail at the appointed place, there to hear the command and counsel of the community". And whoever disregarded this command and could give no sufficient reason for doing so was, according to the Scythian law, cut in two with the sword, driven into exile, or without mercy delivered into common slavery... Then, as one soul and of one accord, all the captains departed from Scythia... — Mark of Kalt, Illuminated Chronicle
Page 9	Attila's Battle With the Romans at Zeiselmauer	Attila's Battle With the Romans at Zeiselmauer; The image depicts the legendary Battle of Zeiselmauer, in which, according to the chronicle, the Huns conquered Pannonia from the Romans. Two groups of horsemen are engaged in fierce combat, while the ground is covered with the bodies of fallen warriors, their blood staining the battlefield red. On the right side of the image, one soldier carries a red-and-white striped shield, while at the center of the composition another warrior bears a golden banner adorned with a Turul bird, seemingly emerging from the miniature itself. While Dietrich and Macrinus were thus deliberating and debating, the Huns crossed the Danube at Sicambria silently by night upon skins, and cruelly slaughtered the army of Macrinus and Dietrich, which was encamped in the open field, since the town of Potenciana could not contain it. Enraged by this assault, Dietrich marched against the Huns and joined battle with them on the field of Tárnok Valley. He fought them there and, as they say, defeated the Huns at the cost of great loss and destruction among his own people. The Huns who survived the battle fled across the Tisza. 125,000 Huns were slain on that day, and Keve, their captain, also fell in the battle. 210,000 men of the armies of Dietrich and Macrinus perished, apart from those who had been slain beneath the tents. When Dietrich saw how great a loss his people had suffered in the battle, on the day following the engagement he withdrew with Macrinus towards the city of Tulln, which was then a town of the Latins and was counted among the cities of Pannonia. Tulln is a town in Austria, 3 stages from Vienna. When the Huns learned that their enemies had withdrawn, they returned to the battlefield and took up the bodies of their comrades and of Keve, their captain, and, as we believe, gave them an honorable and solemn burial, erecting an ornate stone statue there after the Scythian custom. They called that place and the surrounding land Keveaszó. Having thoroughly learned from the battle the spirit of the Romans and their weapons, the Huns, having put their army in order, advanced towards the city of Tulln, where their enemies had gathered. Dietrich and Macrinus are said to have advanced to meet them as far as Zeiselmauer, where they fought from dawn until the 9th hour, and the Romans were utterly defeated. Macrinus was killed, Dietrich was wounded in the forehead by an arrow, and the whole Roman army was destroyed or put to flight. 40,000 Huns perished in the battle, Béla, Keve, and Kadocsa also fell. Their bodies were carried away from the field and buried with the other Huns beside the aforementioned stone statue. After the Roman army had been scattered at Zeiselmauer, they were unable for many years thereafter to gather an army against the Huns. — Mark of Kalt, Illuminated Chronicle
Page 10	King Attila on the Throne	King Attila on the Throne; Attila as the first Hungarian king, seated on a throne and dressed in royal attire, holding the symbols of kingship: a crown, orb, and scepter. In the year 401 of the incarnation of the Lord, and in the 28th year since the arrival of the Hungarians in Pannonia, according to the custom of the Romans, the Huns, namely the Hungarians unanimously exalted Attila as king above themselves, the son of Bendegúz, who was before among the captains. And he ordained his brother Buda as prince and judge from the River Tisza to the River Don. He himself was called the King of the Hungarians, the Terror of the World, the Scourge of God: Attila, by the grace of God, the son of Bendegúz, the great-grandson of Magor, who was raised in Engaddi, King of the Huns, Medes, Goths and Danes, the Terror of the World, the Scourge of God… — Mark of Kalt, Illuminated Chronicle
Page 11	King Attila	King Attila; In the initial "P", King Attila.
Page 13	King Attila	King Attila; King Attila as the first Hungarian king in the Illuminated Chronicle. He is shown wearing a crown, holding a sabre in his right hand and an orb in his left. The warrior king who "makes nations flee".
Page 14	Attila is Besieging Aquileia	Attila is Besieging Aquileia; The Huns, led by Attila, are besieging Aquileia. One Hun warrior carries a shield decorated with a lion, while another bears a Turul flag. Seeing this, King Attila summoned his warriors and said: "See, comrades, this stork is the sign of future events. It knows that we are going to destroy the city, and so it is already flying away so that it will not perish along with the citizens. Be braver in battle tomorrow, then, and you shall see the city fall!" Since he was unable to capture the city with any kind of siege engine, he employed a Scythian stratagem. He ordered each of his one million warriors to give up a saddle, and had the saddles piled into a great heap beneath the walls. Then he commanded that they be set on fire. The flames and intense heat caused the walls and towers to crack and collapse to the ground. — Mark of Kalt, Illuminated Chronicle
Page 14	King Attila with the Turul bird in his shield	King Attila; King Attila with a crown, sword, and the Turul bird in his shield. King Attila used to carry a coat of arms resembling a hawk with a crowned head. The Hungarians continued to carry this symbol in their armies as long as they governed themselves in communities, until the time of Prince Géza, son of Taksony. — Mark of Kalt, Illuminated Chronicle
Page 15	Foundation of Venice	Foundation of Venice; King Attila of the Huns besieged Aquileia. Aquileian inhabitants wearing Italian-style clothing flee by boat across the sea. The city depicted in the background may be Aquileia, but it is more likely to represent Venice, built on lagoons near the coast. According to the text, the inhabitants of Aquileia first fled to a sea island and later founded Venice on the island of Rialto.
Page 16	King Attila and Pope Leo	King Attila and Pope Leo; Attila is meeting Pope Leo. The armored Attila sits on a white horse among his soldiers and looks at the figure floating above his head.
Page 17	King Attila and Pope Leo	The Death of Attila; A heavily blurred and barely visible miniature. According to the chronicle, Attila died from a nosebleed on the wedding night of his marriage to Micolt. In the image, Attila is already lying dead, while Micolt sits beside him on the bed, announcing the king's death to those standing nearby.
Page 21	The Arrival of the Hungarians in Pannonia	The Arrival of the Hungarians in Pannonia; According to the chronicle, the second arrival of the Hungarians in Pannonia, the event now known as the Hungarian conquest of the Carpathian Basin. The image depicts several scenes simultaneously. In the center, Árpád, surrounded by the Hungarians who are shouting the name of God three times, tastes the water of the Danube from a drinking horn, to his left stands Kusid, holding a flask. On the left side, Prince Svatopluk, seated on his throne, receives Kusid, the envoy of the Hungarians. Beside him, a kneeling groom wearing a fur cap holds a white horse with a golden saddle by its bridle. In the center-right, Árpád is shown on a white horse, accompanied by the six chieftains and armored warriors carrying spears. In the right foreground, a group of women and children emerges from a sunken road. The entire background of the image is filled with a rocky mountainous landscape with castles, while shepherds drive cattle among the rocks. Előd, Hungarian Chieftain; In the initial "D", the Hungarian chieftain Előd, father of Álmos, is depicted holding a spear in his right hand and resting his left hand on a shield decorated with a representation of the Turul. (Based on the text, it is not entirely clear whether the chieftain portrayed is Előd or Árpád). Álmos, Hungarian Chieftain; In the initial "A", the Hungarian chieftain Álmos is depicted holding a sword and a shield decorated with the Turul. (It is not entirely clear whether the chieftain portrayed is Álmos or Árpád).
Page 21	The Arrival of the Hungarians in Pannonia The Arrival of the Hungarians in Pannonia (Detail)	The Arrival of the Hungarians in Pannonia; According to the chronicle, the second arrival of the Hungarians in Pannonia, the event now known as the Hungarian conquest of the Carpathian Basin. The image depicts several scenes simultaneously. In the center, Árpád, surrounded by the Hungarians who are shouting the name of God three times, tastes the water of the Danube from a drinking horn, to his left stands Kusid, holding a flask. On the left side, Prince Svatopluk, seated on his throne, receives Kusid, the envoy of the Hungarians. Beside him, a kneeling groom wearing a fur cap holds a white horse with a golden saddle by its bridle. In the center-right, Árpád is shown on a white horse, accompanied by the six chieftains and armored warriors carrying spears. In the right foreground, a group of women and children emerges from a sunken road. The entire background of the image is filled with a rocky mountainous landscape with castles, while shepherds drive cattle among the rocks. In the year 677 of the incarnation of the Lord, 104 years after the death of Attila, King of the Hungarians, in the time of the Emperor Constantine III and Pope Zachary, as it is written in the chronicle of the Romans, the Hungarians came forth from Scythia for the second time... the Magyars as they are commonly called or the Huns, or in the Latin language the Hungarians, entered Pannonia for a second time. — Mark of Kalt, Illuminated Chronicle
Page 21	Előd, Hungarian Chieftain	Előd, Hungarian Chieftain; The Hungarian chieftain Előd, father of Álmos, is depicted holding a spear in his right hand and resting his left hand on a shield decorated with a representation of the Turul. (Based on the text, it is not entirely clear whether the chieftain portrayed is Előd or Árpád).
Page 21	Álmos, Hungarian Chieftain	Álmos, Hungarian Chieftain; The Hungarian chieftain Álmos is depicted holding a sword and a shield decorated with the Turul. (It is not entirely clear whether the chieftain portrayed is Álmos or Árpád). In Scythia, Előd, son of Ügyek, fathered a son by Eunodubilia, whom they named Álmos. The name was given to him because, while his mother was with child, a bird resembling a falcon appeared to her in a dream, and from her womb a rushing stream sprang forth and grew greater, but not in its own land. From this vision it was foretold that illustrious kings would descend from his loins. Since the word for dream in our [Hungarian] language is "álom", and the child's birth had been foretold in a dream, he was therefore called Álmos. — Mark of Kalt, Illuminated Chronicle
Page 23	The Seven Captains	The Seven Captains; The seven chieftains of the Hungarians are depicted in armor. Árpád, the Grand Prince of the Hungarians, stands in the middle, wearing a princely hat and a shield bearing the Turul.
Page 23	Árpád, the First Captain	Árpád, the First Captain; Árpád, Grand Prince of the Hungarians, is depicted wearing a princely hat and holding a sword and a shield bearing the Turul. Since Captain Árpád held some special dignity in Scythia, it being the custom of his lineage, according to Scythian law and tradition, that one of them should go alone before those setting out for war and behind those in retreat, and therefore he is said to have gone before all the other captains when they entered Pannonia. — Mark of Kalt, Illuminated Chronicle
Page 25	Szabolcs, the Second Captain	Szabolcs, the Second Captain; Szabolcs, one of the Seven chieftains of the Hungarians, stands holding a spear and shield.
Page 25	Gyula, the Third Captain	Gyula, the Third Captain; Gyula, one of the Seven chieftains of the Hungarians, stands in armor and a helmet, holding a spear.
Page 26	Kund, the Fourth Captain	Kund, the Fourth Captain; Kund, one of the Seven chieftains of the Hungarians, stands in armor with a spear and a shield on his back.
Page 26	Chieftain Lehel	Lehel, the Fifth Captain; Lehel, one of the Seven chieftains of the Hungarians, holding a sabre and a shield without a coat of arms.
Page 26	Chieftain Bulcsú	Bulcsú, the Sixth Captain; Bulcsú, one of the Seven chieftains of the Hungarians, is depicted wearing a pointed hat.
Page 26	Chieftain Örs	Örs, the Seventh Captain; Örs, one of the Seven chieftains of the Hungarians, stands holding a sword and shield.
Page 28	Count Deodatus	Count Deodatus; Count Deodatus opens the series of guest lineages depicted in the chronicle. He is shown wearing an open-faced helmet, holding a sword, and carrying a shield turned away from the viewer.
Page 28	Héder	Héder; Héder, the ancestor of the Héder or Hédervári family, is depicted bearing a six-pointed golden star accompanied by a crescent moon on his clothing, shield, and banner. This, however, is actually the coat of arms of the Hont clan. The illuminator was presumably unfamiliar with the Hédervári family's paly coat of arms and therefore used the arms of the Hont kindred instead.
Page 29	Vencellin	Vencellin; Vencellin, ancestor of the Ják kindred.
Page 29	Hont	Hont; Hont, the forefather of the Hont-Pázmány kindred. The illuminator mistakenly painted a dog's head on his coat of arms and banner, presumably based on the identification of the name Hunt with the German word Hund "dog". On the previous page, the illuminator mistakenly depicted the coat of arms of the Hont kindred as the coat of arms of the knight Héder.
Page 29	Poth	Poth; Poth, who according to the text is the ancestor of the Bót kindred, is depicted with a bird with white legs on his shield and banner.
Page 30	Oliver and Rátold	Oliver and Rátold; Oliver and Rátold are depicted with a golden linden leaf on their coat of arms.
Page 30	Herman	Herman; Herman the German, with a golden dragon on his shield.
Page 30	Buzád	Buzád; Buzád the ancestor of the Buzád kindred is depicted, with a red horned frontal bone on his shield. The coat of arms of the Buzád kindred should correctly have featured an ox head. However, the depiction in the chronicle resembles a chamois more closely.
Page 31	Keled	Keled; Keled, the ancestor of the Keled kindred.
Page 31	Simon and Michael	Simon and Michael; Simon and Michael, ancestors of the Martonfalvi kindred, are depicted. Melinda, the wife of Bánk, was a descendant of the kindred that migrated from Spain, first known as Martonfalvi and later as Bojót.
Page 32	Three Knights	Three Knights; Three knights are in full armor.
Page 32	The Arrival of Different Clans to Hungary	The Arrival of Different Clans to Hungary; A mountainous, wooded landscape is depicted, with castles in the background. In the foreground, figures in different types of clothing are marching, presumably representing various ethnic groups, although these cannot be identified more precisely.
Page 33	Grand Prince Taksony	Grand Prince Taksony; Taksony, Grand Prince of the Hungarians, bears a blurred shield displaying a black Turul bird and holds a spear in his hand.
Page 33	The Hungarians Are Destroying Bulgaria	The Hungarians Devastate Bulgaria; On the left, a group of Hungarian horsemen with their leader. On the right, a mountainous landscape with two castles and a walled settlement.
Page 34	Captain Lehel and Bulcsu Front of the German Emperor	Captain Lehel and Bulcsú Front of the German Emperor; The story of Lehel's Horn after the Battle of Lechfeld (Augsburg) in 955. According to the chronicle, Lehel was captured after the Hungarian defeat at Lechfeld. As his last wish, he asked for his horn and struck the German Emperor Conrad dead with it. In the miniature, the German emperor is seated on a bench on the left. Opposite him, on the right, stands Captain Lehel, with Captain Bulcsú and German soldiers behind him. Lehel strikes the emperor on the head with a long golden horn, causing blood to run down his face. Lehel and Bulcsú, the illustrious captains, were captured at this place and brought before the emperor. The emperor asked them why they were so cruel toward the Christians. They replied: "We are the great God's vengeance, destined by Him to be a scourge unto you, and therefore we are captured and slain by you when we cease to persecute you." Then the emperor said: "Choose what death you wish to die!" Thereupon Lehel said: "Let my horn be brought to me, and when I have blown a blast upon it I will answer you." They gave him his horn, and as he prepared to blow it, he stepped near the emperor and, according to the account, struck him so forcefully upon the forehead that the horn broke, and the emperor died from that single blow. Lehel then said to him: "You shall go before me, and will be my slave in the other world!" for the Scythians believe that whomsoever they kill in their lifetime, these are obliged to serve them in the next world. Without delay, they were seized and hanged at Regensburg. — Mark of Kalt, Illuminated Chronicle
Page 36	Duel of Botond and the Greek Warrior in Front of the Gates of Constantinople	Duel of Botond and the Greek Warrior in Front of the Gates of Constantinople; On the left, a group of Hungarian mounted warriors is shown, led by Captain Apor riding a white horse. In the center of the miniature is the duel between Botond and the Greek warrior. Having dismounted, Botond thrusts his sword into the chest of the Greek warrior, who is collapsing together with his horse. In the background, atop the walls of Constantinople, Emperor Constantine VII and his wife, Helena Lekapene, watch the scene in mourning.
Page 36	Captain Apor	Captain Apor; Captain Apor, leader of the Hungarian army, bears the Turul bird as his coat of arms on both his banner and shield.
Page 37	Birth of King Stephen	Birth of King Saint Stephen; Birth of King Saint Stephen of Hungary (c. 975). In the room on the right side of the palace, Sarolt, Princess of the Hungarians and mother of Stephen, is depicted sitting in a half-reclining position on the bed, wearing a crown on her head. In her lap is a naked child with a halo around his head, the future king. With her other hand, Sarolt receives a golden crown from Saint Stephen the Martyr. According to legend, the saint foretold to Sarolt that she would give birth to a son who would become king. In the background behind Sarolt stands a group of noblewomen, while in the hall on the left side of the palace, a group of people waits.
Page 38	Grand Prince Géza	Grand Prince Géza; Géza, Grand Prince of the Hungarians, sits on a green marble throne, holding an orb and scepter in his hands, and wearing a red princely cap on his head.
Page 38	The Decapitation of Koppány	The Decapitation of Koppány; Rebellion of Koppány, the Duke of Somogy (997 or 998). On the left, Stephen (who at the time was Grand Prince of the Hungarians) is depicted with a halo, riding a white horse and accompanied by knights. On the right, soldiers are standing, while in the centre Vencellin is shown in the act of beheading Koppány, who is kneeling with his hands tied behind his back.
Page 39	King Saint Stephen in military ornament	King Saint Stephen in Military Ornament; King Saint Stephen is depicted in military attire. The warrior king, in the prime of his life, stands on rocky ground against a blue background. He wears brown greaves decorated with golden dots, while his coat of mail is covered by a surcoat bearing the red-and-white Árpád stripes. A royal crown rests upon his head, with a halo around it. In his right hand he holds a banner, and in his left a shield, both bearing the coat of arms with the double cross on a triple mount, symbolizing his status as an Apostolic King.
Page 40	King Saint Stephen captures Gyula	King Saint Stephen Captures Gyula; King Saint Stephen of Hungary captures his maternal uncle, Gyula, the chieftain and ruler of Transylvania. King Stephen is seated on a white horse, wearing the Hungarian double-cross coat of arms on his chest, a royal crown on his head, and a halo. With a warning, commanding gesture, he points toward the captured Gyula, whose feet are shackled and whose hands are being bound by a knight. On the left, Stephen's knights pursue Gyula's warriors. After Saint Stephen had been deemed worthy and, by divine ordinance, had received the crown of royal majesty, he waged a famous and profitable war against his maternal uncle, Gyula, who at that time ruled the whole country of Transylvania by his own authority. In the year of our Lord 1002, therefore, Saint Stephen captured Gyula, together with his wife and two sons, and sent them to Hungary. He did this because Gyula, though admonished many times by the blessed King Stephen, would neither convert to the Christian faith nor cease from doing injury to the Hungarians. Saint Stephen incorporated Gyula's entire realm, which was vast and exceedingly wealthy, into the Kingdom of Hungary. This land, called Erdőelve [beyond the forest] in Hungarian, is watered by many rivers, in whose sands gold is found, and the gold of this land is of exceptionally fine quality. — Mark of Kalt, Illuminated Chronicle
Page 40	King Stephen on the Throne	King Saint Stephen on the Throne; King Saint Stephen of Hungary sits upon a green marble pedestal adorned with royal regalia, with a halo encircling his head.
Page 41	The Victory of King Stephen over Kean, Duke of the Bulgarians and Slavs	The Victory of King Stephen over Kean, Duke of the Bulgarians and Slavs; At the center stands the haloed Hungarian King Saint Stephen, wearing a coat of mail adorned with a coat of arms bearing the double cross, with both feet on the body of the fallen Duke Kean, who lies on the ground holding a bow in his hand. One of the king's soldiers holds the reins of his horse, equipped with a Western-style knightly saddle, as well as his shield decorated with the double cross. In the background, Hungarian warriors pursue fleeing Bulgarian warriors dressed in Eastern-style clothing. After this he led his army against Kean, duke of the Bulgarians and Slavs, whose peoples dwell in places made very strong by their natural position. Wherefore it was only after much labor and the sweat of battle that he at last conquered and slew the aforesaid duke. He acquired an immeasurable abundance of treasure, especially gold, pearls, and precious stones. There he settled one of his great-grandfathers, named Zoltán, who later held those parts of Transylvania as his hereditary domain, and was therefore commonly called Zoltán of Transylvania. He lived into the time of the saintly king and was a very old man, therefore the king made him lord over the wealthy peoples. — Mark of Kalt, Illuminated Chronicle
Page 41	King Stephen in Royal Regalia	King Stephen in Royal Regalia; King Saint Stephen is depicted in royal regalia. On his chest is the Hungarian coat of arms with the double cross, he wears a crown and a halo, holding a scepter in his right hand and an orb in his left.
Page 42	The Foundation of Saints Peter and Paul Church of Óbuda	The Foundation of Saints Peter and Paul Church of Óbuda; King Saint Stephen of Hungary and Queen Gisela kneel facing each other. As a symbol of the founding of the church, they hold a miniature replica of the Church of Saints Peter and Paul in Óbuda.
Page 44	Prince Emeric's Funeral and the Blinding of Vazul	Prince Emeric's Funeral and the Blinding of Vazul; In the foreground, the haloed Saint Emeric, dressed in princely attire, is being placed in a marble sarcophagus. Standing before the sarcophagus, King Saint Stephen of Hungary raises his right hand to his face in grief and gazes mournfully at the body of his son. Beside him stands Queen Gisela, who is watching the scene unfolding in the background: there lies the bound Vazul, whose eyes are gouged out by Sebes, Queen Gisela's envoy, who, according to the chronicle, then pours molten lead into his ears. On the left, King Stephen's envoys can be seen arriving too late to free Vazul, the king's cousin, from prison.
Page 44	King Stephen Encourages Prince Andrew, Béla and Levente to Flee	King Stephen Encourages Prince Andrew, Béla and Levente to Flee; King Saint Stephen of Hungary lies ill in bed, raising his right hand warningly toward the three princes, the sons of Vazul, who are standing beside the bed: Andrew, Béla, and Levente.
Page 46	King Stephen's Funeral King Stephen's Funeral	King Saint Stephen's Funeral; The funeral of King Saint Stephen of Hungary (1038). The king's body is placed in an ornate marble sarcophagus. The funeral ceremony is conducted by four bishops in a solemn atmosphere. At the foot of the sarcophagus stands Queen Gisela, her hands clasped in prayer, mourning deeply and with devotion.
Page 47	King Peter	King Peter; King Peter Orseolo, clad in armor, holds a sword in his right hand and a royal crown.
Page 47	King Peter Is Driven Away by Samuel Aba and His Soldiers	King Peter Is Driven Away by Samuel Aba and His Soldiers; Samuel Aba and his Hungarian horsemen pursue King Peter Orseolo, who is holding a crown in one hand.
Page 48	King Samuel Aba	King Samuel Aba; King Samuel Aba, wearing a chainmail hauberk, wields a sword in his right hand while holding the royal crown in his left.
Page 50	Battle of Ménfő: Victory of Emperor Henry III Over King Samuel Aba Battle of Ménfő: Killing of King Samuel Aba	The Battle of Ménfő; The Battle of Ménfő (1044). The victory of Holy Roman Emperor Henry III over King Samuel Aba of Hungary. The great battle takes place in the centre: on the right is the German army, led by the emperor, while on the left is the Hungarian army, led by Samuel Aba. A part of the Hungarian forces - the soldiers wearing caps - abandon him as supporters of King Peter of Hungary. One of them drops the Hungarian flag bearing the Árpád stripes, its pole broken, to the ground, while above it, breaking through the frame of the miniature, flies the victorious flag decorated with the German eagle. In the left foreground, King Samuel Aba reaches with both hands toward his crown lying on the ground, while a soldier pierces him through the heart with his sword. On the right, before a cross placed upon an altar, the German emperor kneels barefoot, wearing a simple woollen garment, and gives thanks for the victory.
Page 50	King Aba's Envoy Delivers a Letter Written in Favor of Peace to the German Emperor	King Aba's Envoy Delivers a Letter Written in Favor of Peace to the German Emperor; An envoy of King Samuel Aba of Hungary delivers a letter seeking peace to Holy Roman Emperor Henry III. (The event depicted in this miniature precedes the Battle of Ménfő shown in the previous illustration).
Page 53	King Peter Gives Hungary as a Vassal to the German Emperor	King Peter Makes Hungary a Fief of the Holy Roman Emperor; From the right, King Peter of Hungary, presents a gilded spear to Holy Roman Emperor Henry III, seated on the left, thereby acknowledging him as his overlord. Five young noblemen bring gifts.
Page 54	Prince BéLa's Duel With the Pomeranian	Prince Béla's Duel With the Pomeranian; Prince Béla knocks his Pomeranian opponent from his horse with his lance. Of the three princes – Andrew, Béla, and Levente – who fled from Hungary first to Bohemia and then to Poland, Béla fights in place of the Polish duke and his sons against the ruler of the Pomeranians, who had refused to pay the annual tribute, and emerges victorious.
Page 59	King Peter's Blinding, Prince Andrew Takes the Crown	Prince Andrew Takes the Crown, the Blinding of King Peter; A fully armed soldier kneels on the body of King Peter of Hungary, who is lying on the ground, and gouges out his eyes. The fallen crown can be seen beside Peter's head. On the left, Bishop Beneta stands holding out the crown to Prince Andrew.
Page 60	Coronation of King Andrew	Coronation of King Andrew; The coronation of King Andrew I of Hungary (1046). King Andrew is seated on the throne in ceremonial attire, holding a scepter in his left hand. Two bishops place the royal crown upon his head, while a third bishop presents him with a sword. (The presence of three bishops in the scene is likely explained by the chronicle's account that, following Vata's pagan uprising, only three bishops survived.)
Page 61	The Destruction of Emperor Henry's Ships at Pozsony	The Destruction of Emperor Henry's Ships at Pozsony; The Siege of Pozsony (1052). Holy Roman Emperor Henry III launched his fifth campaign against the Kingdom of Hungary and unsuccessfully besieged Pozsony (now Bratislava, Slovakia). The Hungarians sank the imperial supply ships on the Danube, depriving the besieging army of its provisions. Knight Zotmund (Kund the Diver) was a soldier in the army of King Andrew I of Hungary, he swam beneath the German ships, scuttling and sinking them one after another. The miniature depicts Emperor Henry III below the castle of Pozsony, standing on the Danube in a leaking boat with two knights as it fills with water. Beside them, another boat, also deliberately holed and sinking, carries two desperate men.
Page 64	The Scene of Várkony: The Crown and Sword The Scene of Várkony: The Crown and Sword	The Scene of Várkony: The Crown and Sword; At the time of the expulsion of King Peter Orseolo from Hungary in 1046, the Hungarians invited back the sons of Vazul to take the throne in his place. Of the returning brothers, Andrew and Levente, Andrew came to power. Béla returned to Hungary only later, in 1048, at his brother's request. Sharing his rule with him, the king entrusted Béla with the governance of one-third of the country, thereby establishing the institution of the duchy. According to the chronicle, Andrew also declared his younger brother to be his heir. The peaceful relationship between the two brothers changed toward the end of Andrew I's reign, when he concluded peace with King Henry IV of Germany. To strengthen the agreement, the Hungarian king's five-year-old son, Solomon, was married to Henry's sister, Judith. Shortly afterward, the child Solomon was crowned king as well. This harmed Béla's interests, and he openly expressed his opposition. At the end of 1059, King Andrew summoned Duke Béla to Várkony Castle, located on the banks of the Tisza River, and demanded that he declare his intentions: would he accept the newly crowned Solomon as his successor, or, according to their earlier agreement, did he intend to rule after Andrew's death? The ill king had both the symbols of royal and ducal authority – the crown and the sword – placed beside him. He then offered Béla a choice: "If you desire the kingdom, take the crown. If you desire the duchy, take the sword." However, Andrew had no intention of leaving Béla's decision to chance. He instructed his trusted men that if Béla chose the crown, they were not to let him leave. As the duke entered the hall, Ispán (Count) Miklós quietly warned him: "If you wish to live, choose the sword." Béla therefore chose the sword, the symbol of the duchy. Immediately afterward, he fled with his family to Poland, intending to return later with military assistance. The miniature depicts two scenes: On the right, Duke Béla stands before the doorway while Ispán Nicholas advises him to choose the sword. On the left, inside the chamber, Duke Béla stands at the foot of King Andrew's sickbed. The ill king lies in bed, with two of his leading nobles and his young son Solomon, wearing the crown, standing behind him. On the step of the bed lie the sword and the crown: the sword symbolises the duchy, while the crown represents the kingship.
Page 67	Prince Béla Wins the Crown	Prince Béla Wins the Crown; On the left, two noblemen remove the crown from Solomon's head. On the right stands King Béla, holding the orb in his left hand. An elderly nobleman presents him with the sword, while another places the crown upon his head.
Page 69	German Emperor Henry IV Brings Solomon Back to Hungary	German Emperor Henry IV Brings Solomon Back to Hungary; The German invasion of Hungary (1063). In the background, the Basilica of Székesfehérvár can be seen with its four towers. On the right, the German Emperor Henry IV approaches at the head of an army, holding the royal crown in his right hand and leading his brother-in-law, King Solomon of Hungary, by the arm with his left. Behind the soldiers fly the imperial eagle banner of the Holy Roman Empire and the Hungarian double-cross banner.
Page 71	King Solomon and His Younger Brother Prince David	King Solomon and His Younger Brother Prince David; On the left is King Solomon of Hungary, depicted wearing a crown and holding a scepter and an orb, while on the right is his younger brother, Prince David, shown wearing a princely cap and carrying a shield and a sword.
Page 72	Prince Ladislaus Is Fighting a Duel With a Cuman Warrior Who Kidnapped a Girl Prince Ladislaus Is Fighting a Duel With a Cuman Warrior Who Kidnapped a Girl	Prince Ladislaus Is Fighting a Duel With a Cuman Warrior Who Kidnapped a Girl; In the foreground, Saint Ladislaus, distinguished by his halo, is engaged in combat with the Cuman warrior, behind whom stands the abducted maiden wearing a crown. In the background, set against a rocky mountainous landscape, the Hungarians pursue the retreating Cumans, while King Solomon of Hungary and Prince Géza are depicted in the center. The Hungarian flag bearing the double cross projects beyond the frame of the miniature.
Page 74	The Capture of Belgrade and the Distribution of the Spoils of War	The Capture of Belgrade and the Distribution of the Spoils of War; The Siege of Belgrade (1071). In the background, the fortress of Belgrade, besieged by the Hungarians, rises atop rocky cliffs. The fortress is set on fire by a Hungarian girl held captive within its walls, who uses a torch to ignite it. In the foreground, the distribution of the spoils of war is depicted: seated at a table is Count Vid, chief advisor of King Solomon of Hungary, dividing the booty into four shares. Standing beside the table are King Solomon and his cousins, Princes Géza and Ladislaus, the latter depicted with a halo.
Page 78	The Feud Between King Solomon and Prince Géza	The Feud Between King Solomon and Prince Géza; King Solomon of Hungary is seated on the throne, wearing a crown and holding a scepter. To his right stands Count Vid, the instigator of discord, holding two swords together in a single scabbard. In the background, on the right, stands his cousin, Prince Géza, wearing a princely cap, to whom three envoys are presenting a sealed letter from the Byzantine emperor. This further intensifies Solomon's envy. He incited the king with this proverb: "As two sharp swords cannot dwell in one scabbard, so you two cannot reign together in one kingdom." Count Vid's poisonous words filled the king with hatred and discord. — Mark of Kalt, Illuminated Chronicle
Page 78	The People of Niš Pay Homage to King Solomon and Prince Géza	The People of Niš Pay Homage to King Solomon and Prince Géza; The capture of Niš (1072). The Hungarians captured the Byzantine city. King Solomon of Hungary and Prince Géza receive gifts from the local inhabitants of Niš.
Page 81	Prince Géza and Abbot Villermus	Prince Géza and Abbot Villermus; The abbot of the monastery of Szekszárd, Villermus, is depicted putting on a knight's disguise over his bare upper body. In the same scene, he is shown leading a saddled horse as he stands before Prince Géza, waking him from his sleep and urging him to flee. Behind the head of the reclining prince stand the two traitors, Petrud and Bikás.
Page 81	Escape of Prince Géza	Escape of Prince Géza; The Battle of Kemej (1074). Prince Géza is depicted fleeing with his soldiers. Some distance behind him follow his two disloyal knights, Petrud and Bikás. As a sign of their treachery, they raise their shields, however, the soldiers of King Solomon of Hungary, not recognizing the signal, cut them down.
Page 83	The Vision of Prince Ladislaus	The Vision of Prince Ladislaus; Prince Géza is shown on a white horse as a descending angel places a crown upon his head. Prince Ladislaus, likewise mounted on a white horse, gazes upward with outstretched arms at the heavenly vision. According to the chronicle, only Ladislaus sees the vision and recounts it to his brother Géza, who vows that, if the vision is fulfilled, he will build a church on that very spot.
Page 85	The Battle of Mogyoród	The Battle of Mogyoród; The Battle of Mogyoród (1074). On the left, the warriors of Prince Géza advance victoriously, led by Prince Saint Ladislaus. Opposing them is King Solomon of Hungary, at the head of his warriors. The soldiers carry the Hungarian double-cross and Árpád stripes banners.
Page 87	The Vision of King Géza and Prince Ladislaus	The Vision of King Géza and Prince Ladislaus; The miniature on page 83 of the Illuminated Chronicle depicts the vision of Prince Saint Ladislaus, in which a descending angel places a crown upon Géza's head, foreshadowing his coronation as king. After they defeated their cousin, King Solomon of Hungary, at the Battle of Mogyoród, Géza was crowned king, and he then visited with his brother the place where the vision had occurred. In the miniature, on the banks of the Danube at Vác, King I Géza of Hungary is shown holding the orb, while Prince Saint Ladislaus holds a battle axe, the two stand embracing each other. Among the trees appears a stag with burning candles on the tips of its antlers. According to the chronicle, they are deciding where to build the church they had vowed to erect in the event of their victory. At the place where the stag, identified as the Angel of God, set down its feet, Géza founded the church.
Page 89	King Solomon Again Asks for Help From the German Emperor	King Solomon Again Asks for Help From the German Emperor; Holy Roman Emperor Henry IV sits enthroned, wearing a crown and holding a sceptre in his left hand. Kneeling before him, King Solomon of Hungary grasps with both hands the outstretched right hand of Emperor Henry IV, the brother of his wife, Judith. In the foreground, the royal crown lies on the ground.
Page 91	The Escape of King Solomon	The Escape of King Solomon; In the background stands Pozsony Castle, with warriors looking down from its walls. In the left foreground is King Géza I of Hungary, beside whom Prince Saint Ladislaus leads his warriors on a white horse. He holds a shield bearing the Hungarian double cross in his left hand and a sword in his right. Above his haloed head, an angel hovers, wielding a flaming sword. On the right, King Solomon of Hungary is depicted fleeing on horseback while looking back at his pursuers. He holds a sword in his right hand and a red-and-white Árpád-striped shield in his left.
Page 92	The Coronation of Ladislaus the First	The Coronation of Ladislaus I The coronation of King Ladislaus I of Hungary (1077). King Saint Ladislaus is depicted wearing an ermine-lined mantle, holding a sword in his right hand and an orb in his left. Two angels place the crown upon his head, while two bishops hold it from either side.
Page 93	King Saint Ladislaus, the Knight King	King Saint Ladislaus, the Knight King; King Saint Ladislaus of Hungary, is depicted with a halo and a crown, clad in full knightly armor. On his breast is the Hungarian coat of arms bearing the double cross. He holds a battle axe in his right hand and an orb in his left.
Page 98	The Ruthenians Pledge Allegiance to King Ladislaus	The Ruthenians Pledge Allegiance to King Ladislaus; Seated on his throne, King Saint Ladislaus is surrounded by his warriors. Before him kneel several Ruthenians wearing caps, their hands raised in supplication. At their head is their prince, who has placed his cap at the king's feet.
Page 98	Siege of Kraków	Siege of Kraków; In the background stands Kraków Castle on the bank of the Vistula River. In the left foreground, King Saint Ladislaus leans with his left hand on a shield bearing the Árpád-striped coat of arms while holding a sword in his right hand. In the right foreground, a soldier pours flour from his greave onto a pile of earth, while another soldier behind him carries more flour in the same manner. According to the chronicle, the defenders of the castle, seeing that the besieging army still had an abundant supply of food, voluntarily surrendered the fortress.
Page 99	Construction of the Nagyvárad's Church	Construction of the Nagyvárad's Church; On the bank of the Körös River, King Saint Ladislaus, depicted with a halo and raising his hand, stands before the church under construction at Nagyvárad.
Page 99	King Ladislaus Receives Ambassadors	King Saint Ladislaus Receives Ambassadors; The left side of the image depicts King Saint Ladislaus accompanied by two attendants. On the right, four foreign envoys approach him, the foremost presenting a letter in a gesture of homage. According to the chronicle, the envoys came to invite Ladislaus to assume command of the First Crusade.
Page 101	Funeral of King Saint Ladislaus	Funeral of King Saint Ladislaus; The image depicts a scene that is not mentioned in the text of the chronicle but appears in every known version of the legend of King Saint Ladislaus: a wagon without horses carries the king's body toward the place of burial he had chosen, the church in Nagyvárad. The body of King Ladislaus lies on a four-wheeled wagon, with a crown and halo on his head and a scepter and orb in his hands. The wagon pole extending out of the image clearly indicates that no horses are harnessed to the wagon. On the right, a group of astonished onlookers can be seen, while in the background stands the church in Nagyvárad built by Ladislaus.
Page 101	The Coronation of Coloman	The Coronation of Coloman; The coronation of King Coloman the Learned (1095). A bishop places the crown upon the head of King Coloman of Hungary, who is depicted as a hunchback and in simple attire, in accordance with the tradition preserved in medieval Hungarian chronicles.
Page 105	King Coloman and Prince Álmos in Front of the Church of Dömös	King Coloman and Prince Álmos in Front of the Church of Dömös; The hunchbacked King Coloman of Hungary and his younger brother, Prince Álmos shake hands before the Monastery of Dömös, founded by Álmos, as a symbol of their reconciliation. A priest places his hands on their arms, blessing their reconciliation.
Page 105	The Hunt in Csór	The Hunt in Csór; In the Bakony Mountains at Csór, Prince Álmos rides with two companions, who are supporters of King Coloman of Hungary. At his horse's feet, his falcon holds a crow by the neck, while a barking dog runs toward them. The king dismissed the prince in peace, that he might hunt in the Bakony. Under the pretext of showing him honor, he sent two of his retainers with him, secretly instructing them to carefully sound out the duke's mind and report to the king if the duke were plotting against him. When the duke came to Csór, he released his falcon, which caught a crow. Then, in his simplicity, the prince said to the retainers: "What if the crow were to swear to the falcon that it would never caw again, if the falcon would release it?" But they replied: "The crow's oath would be in vain, for the falcon would not release it, nor could the crow swear an oath, being a senseless creature." That same night they reported the duke's words to the king. The duke reached the Bakony for the purpose of hunting, but immediately left them and fled again to Passau to seek the help of the king of the Germans. — Mark of Kalt, Illuminated Chronicle
Page 106	The Blinding of Prince Álmos and His Little Son Béla	The Blinding of Prince Álmos and His Little Son Béla; Seated on his throne, King Coloman orders two soldiers to blind Prince Álmos and his son Béla, and to castrate the boy. In the background on the right, Prince Álmos lies on the ground while a soldier gouges out his eyes. In front of him lies the blinded child Béla, however, the soldier kneeling beside him castrates a dog instead of the boy. Later, Coloman's son, King Stephen II, remained childless, so he arranged the marriage of his blinded cousin Béla. Béla had at least six children, thereby ensuring the continuation of the Árpád dynasty's royal bloodline.
Page 106	King Coloman Wants to Capture Prince Álmos	Prince Álmos Is to Be Arrested by King Coloman; In the foreground, the seriously ill King Coloman of Hungary orders Benedek to take Prince Álmos into custody. In the background, Prince Álmos seeks refuge at the altar of the church in Dömös, but Benedek nevertheless attempts to drag him away. To the side, three monks stand with swords in their hands, ready to prevent Álmos from being taken away.
Page 108	The Coronation of Stephen II, Coloman's Son	The Coronation of Stephen II, Coloman's Son; Two bishops crown the young King Stephen II, the son of King Coloman. He holds the orb in one hand and the scepter in the other. His coronation took place in 1116.
Page 113	The Assembly of the Realm of Arad	The Bloody Assembly of the Realm at Arad; The assembly of the realm at Arad (1131). The blind King Béla II of Hungary was crowned at Székesfehérvár. Shortly afterwards, a diet was held near Arad, where, at the urging of Queen Helena, Béla's supporters massacred the 68 magnates whom they held responsible for the king's blinding in childhood. The miniature depicts King Béla II and Queen Helena, seated on the throne. The queen orders the execution of the magnates who had advised the blinding of the young Béla during the reign of King Coloman of Hungary. On the right are the magnates who have already been executed and those awaiting execution, behind them, a soldier, his enormous sword raised high, is about to strike. He begot four sons, namely Géza, Ladislas, Stephen and Álmos. During his reign, after a council with the king and the barons, Queen Helena summoned a general assembly of the realm near Arad. On the day of the assembly, while the king sat upon his royal throne, the queen arrived with her sons and took her seat beside the king. She then addressed the entire people as follows: "All faithful people, nobles, old and young, rich and poor, hear me! God has granted each of you the natural gift of sight, let me therefore hear why our lord the king was deprived of his sight, and on whose counsel this was done. Reveal this to me, exact rightful vengeance upon those responsible here and now, and bring them to justice on our behalf. For, behold, to your king instead of two eyes God has given four." After she had spoken, the people rose up against those barons on whose counsel the king had been blinded, and some of them they bound, some they beheaded. On that day they cruelly killed sixty-eight of the infamous ones, and wrote up the names of all their issue, both male and female. Moreover, all their possessions were distributed among the cathedral churches, and for this reason all servile villages in Hungary are called royal donations. — Mark of Kalt, Illuminated Chronicle
Page 114	King Béla II	King Béla II the Blind; King Béla II with the crown, scepter, and orb.
Page 117	Coronation of King Géza II	Coronation of King Géza II; The coronation of King Géza II of Hungary (1141). Two bishops place the crown upon Géza's head, while a young man – presumably Géza's eldest younger brother, Prince Ladislaus, the future usurper – wearing a princely cap, leads a white horse by the reins and presents the royal sword to Géza.
Page 117	King Géza II in Royal Regalia	King Géza II in Royal Regalia; Standing figure of King Géza II, wearing a hauberk and a crown, holding a scepter in his left hand and resting his right hand on his shield.
Page 119	German Emperor Konrad III and French King Louis VII March through Hungary with Their Crusader Army	King Conrad III of Germany and King Louis VII of France Cross Hungary with Their Crusading Armies; The armies of the Second Crusade passing through the Kingdom of Hungary (1147). King Géza II of Hungary, who was on poor terms with Conrad III of Germany, nevertheless granted permission for the crusaders to cross Hungary, allowing the German forces, numbering around 20,000 men, to reach Byzantine territory. In the miniature, Conrad III rides on horseback in the foreground on the left, wearing the imperial crown. In his left hand, he holds a heraldic shield bearing the single-headed German eagle. Behind him is King Louis VII of France, wearing a crown and leading his crusading army. On the right, Hungarian warriors ride on horseback, led by an archer holding his bow ready to shoot.
Page 120	King Géza II of Hungary and King Louis VII of France	King Géza II of Hungary and King Louis VII of France; On the left is King Louis VII of France, wearing a crown, on the right is King Géza II of Hungary, attired in royal regalia. The joint depiction of the two rulers symbolizes the cordial relations between them, which the Illuminated Chronicle emphasizes by contrasting it with the truculent behavior of the German crusaders.
Page 121	The Coronation of Stephen III	The Coronation of Stephen III; The coronation of Stephen III of Hungary (1162). In the miniature, King Stephen III (son of Géza II) sits on the throne, holding the orb in his right hand. The illuminator depicted the king as a mature man, although he was only fifteen years old at the time of his coronation. A bishop places the crown on his head, while a Hungarian nobleman wearing a pointed cap presents the king with the sword of the kingdom.
Page 121	Prince Ladislaus, the Usurper of the Throne and the Stealing of the Crown	The Usurper King Ladislaus II and the Theft of the Crown; On the left, Prince Ladislaus (son of Béla II of Hungary) is seated while a courtier whispers something into his ear. In the center, the Archbishop of Kalocsa holds the royal crown in his hands. In the background, a figure rides on horseback, also carrying a crown.
Page 122	The Usurper Prince Stephen	The Usurper Prince Stephen; Prince Stephen, the son of King Béla II, is depicted wearing a princely cap and a crimson mantle, holding a sword in his left hand. He later became the anti-king Stephen IV.
Page 122	King Béla III	King Béla III; King Béla III is depicted wearing a royal crown and chain mail, holding an orb in his right hand and a red-and-white striped flag bearing the Árpád stripes in his left hand.
Page 122	Coronation of King Emeric	Coronation of King Emeric; The coronation of King Emeric of Hungary (1196). Emeric is enthroned holding a scepter and an orb, while two bishops place the crown upon his head.
Page 123	King Emeric	King Emeric; King Emeric of Hungary is depicted with a crown, a scepter, and an orb.
Page 123	Coronation of King Ladislaus III	Coronation of King Ladislaus IIII; The coronation of King Ladislaus III of Hungary (1204). In the miniature, a bishop places the crown on the king's head. At the time of his coronation, Ladislaus was only five years old, but the illuminator depicts him as a mature man. The author of the chronicle did not refer to the anti-king Ladislaus as Ladislaus II of Hungary, and therefore presents this Ladislaus as the second of that name, even though he is the third in the list of kings.
Page 123	King Ladislaus III	King Ladislaus IIII; King Ladislaus III, with crown, sceptre, and orb.
Page 123	Coronation of King Andrew II	Coronation of King Andrew II; The coronation of King Andrew II of Hungary (1205). On the right side of the image are the king's daughter, Saint Elizabeth, with a halo, and two of his sons, most likely the future King Béla IV of Hungary and Prince Coloman.
Page 124	King Andrew II	King Andrew II; King Andrew II of Hungary in royal regalia, holding the orb and the Hungarian flag bearing the double cross.
Page 124	King Andrew II at the Head of His Crusader Army	King Andrew II at the Head of His Crusader Army; The Fifth Crusade led by King Andrew II of Hungary (1217–1218). In the miniature, King Andrew II rides along a rocky riverbank at the head of his knights, one of whom carries a red banner bearing the Hungarian coat of arms with the double cross.
Page 125	Coronation of King Béla IV	Coronation of King Béla IV; The coronation of King Béla IV of Hungary (1235). Seated on the throne, Béla IV is crowned by a bishop, while his younger brother, Prince Coloman, presents him with the Sword of State.
Page 125	The First Arrival of the Mongols	The First Mongol Invasion; The First Mongol invasion of Hungary (1241–1242). The Mongols pursue King Béla IV of Hungary, who is fleeing on horseback with his followers. The Mongols are depicted in Cuman-style attire, armed with sabres.
Page 126	The Fight of King Béla IV of Hungary with King Ottokar II of Bohemia	The Fight of King Béla IV of Hungary with King Ottokar II of Bohemia; The Battle of Kressenbrunn (1260). A cavalry battle between the armies of King Ottokar II of Bohemia and King Béla IV of Hungary. At the center, Béla IV is depicted riding a white horse, wearing armor and a crown.
Page 126	King Béla IV	King Béla IV in Royal Regalia; King Béla IV of Hungary, with crown, sceptre, and orb.
Page 126	Flagellants	Flagellants; Flagellants (1263). In the miniature, rocky landscape with churches in the background. In the foreground are four flagellants, two of whom are scourging themselves bloody.
Page 127	Coronation of King Stephen V	Coronation of King Stephen V The coronation of Stephen V of Hungary as Junior King (1246, from 1262, he used the title "Junior King" as his royal title). In the miniature, Stephen V stands on the right, while his elderly father, King Béla IV of Hungary, places the crown upon his head. On the left, behind him, stands his wife, Queen Maria Laskarina.
Page 128	King Ladislaus IV	King Ladislaus IV the Cuman; King Ladislaus IV of Hungary, depicted wearing the traditional attire of the Cumans, whom he favored. His mother, Queen Elizabeth, was the daughter of a Cuman chieftain. However, he did not receive the name "the Cuman" because of his mother's ancestry, rather, it was a name given to him during his lifetime. As a child, he was abducted by powerful nobles seeking to gain influence, in order to keep his father under their control. After ascending to the throne, Ladislaus preferred spending time with his "beloved Cumans" rather than among the Hungarian nobles, adopting their way of life and customs.
Page 128	The Second Mongol Invasion	The Second Mongol Invasion; The Second Mongol invasion of Hungary (1285–1286). The campaign of the Golden Horde against the Kingdom of Hungary was led by Khan Nogai and Khan Talabuga. The Tatars attacked with two armies, but encountered strong resistance from the outset. They suffered a defeat at Pest at the hands of the royal and noble forces. They then withdrew through Transylvania, while the local nobles and the population inflicted further heavy losses on them. The miniature depicts a battle between the Tatars and the Hungarians. Then, in the year of our Lord 1282, Oldamir, leader of the Cumans, gathered an army of Cumans near the lake which is called Hód with the intention to invade and make subject the kingdom of the Hungarians. King Ladislas went out against him, like the valiant Joshua, to fight for his people and his realm. In this campaign, Roland, son of Thomas, a vigorous warrior, bravely attacked the Cumans with his spear, piercing and striking down many of them to his great renown. When the battle between the two sides grew exceedingly fierce, by the grace of God a sudden and unexpected shower of rain fell upon the pagans. They had put their trust in their bows and arrows, but because of the heavy rain, they became, in the words of the prophet, like dung upon the earth. Thus, with God's help, King Ladislas gained the victory. Finally, a few of the Cumans who had escaped fled to the Tatars, and at their instigation, in the year of our Lord 1285, the Tatars entered Hungary for the second time and cruelly burned everything as far as Pest. — Mark of Kalt, Illuminated Chronicle
Page 129	Bishop Philip of Fermo, the Papal Legate Is Coming to Hungary	Bishop Philip of Fermo, the Papal Legate Is Coming to Hungary; The arrival of Philip of Fermo in Hungary (1279). In the miniature, Philip, Bishop of Fermo, the papal legate, is depicted seated on a white horse in cardinal's attire, accompanied by a mounted soldier. He came to Hungary to strengthen the influence of the Catholic Church on behalf of the pope, to enforce the adoption of a Christian way of life among the Cumans, and to help consolidate the rule of King Ladislaus IV of Hungary. However, his intervention led to serious political conflicts. King Ladislaus's wife was the daughter of King Charles of Apulia. However, he spurned the marriage-bed and slept with Cuman women, whose names were Édua, Köpcsecs, and Mandula, he also had many other concubines. Through his love for them, his heart became deservedly depraved, and he was hated by his barons and the nobles of his kingdom. Moreover, Philip of Fermo, the papal legate, came to oppose him because he lived according to Cuman rather than Catholic customs. He forbade the Hungarians to shave their beards and cut their hair contrary to Hungarian custom, and to wear Cuman caps, which had by then become customary in Hungary. He also threatened the king with excommunication unless he rejected the pagans, followed Christian customs, and returned to the marriage-bed. But having achieved nothing with the king, he returned home. — Mark of Kalt, Illuminated Chronicle
Page 129	The Murdered King Ladislaus the Cuman and His Murderers	The Murdered King Ladislaus IV the Cuman and His Murderers; Murder of King Ladislaus IV of Hungary (1290). King Ladislaus IV was killed by Cumans whom he had favoured, near the castle of Körösszeg. In the miniature, the murdered king's body, dressed in Cuman attire, lies in a tent decorated with Árpád striped and Hungarian double-cross coats of arms. On the left, the two assassins, Cuman warriors holding swords, are shown departing. Not long afterwards, in the year of our Lord 1290, on a Monday, shortly before the feast of the virgin and martyr Saint Margaret, near the castle of Körösszeg, the king was miserably killed by the very Cumans whom he had favoured so greatly. — Mark of Kalt, Illuminated Chronicle
Page 130	Prince Andrew Is Brought to Hungary	Prince Andrew Is Brought to Hungary; The arrival of Prince Andrew in Hungary (1278 and 1290). In the miniature, Prince Andrew is depicted riding in a princely cap, in 1290, he was crowned King Andrew III of Hungary, the grandson of King Andrew II of Hungary.
Page 131	The Child Charles Robert Is Brought to Hungary	The Child Charles Robert Is Brought to Hungary; Arrival of Charles Robert in Hungary (1300). The miniature depicts the 12-year-old future King Charles I of Hungary, wearing a princely cap and riding a white horse, accompanied by two noblemen. Charles Robert was crowned three times: in 1301, 1309, and 1310. Only Charles's third coronation fully complied with customary law: in Székesfehérvár, the Archbishop of Esztergom placed the Holy Crown of Hungary on Charles's head.
Page 132	Prince Wenceslaus Arrives in Hungary	Prince Wenceslaus Arrives in Hungary; Arrival of Wenceslaus in Hungary (1301). In the miniature, Prince Wenceslaus, son of King Wenceslaus II of Bohemia, comes to Hungary accompanied by two noblemen.
Page 133	King Wenceslaus returns to Bohemia	King Wenceslaus Returns to Bohemia; King Wenceslaus II of Bohemia bringing his son King Wenceslaus of Hungary back to Bohemia (1304). In the miniature, from left, King Wenceslaus II of Bohemia is depicted riding a white horse. Beside him is his son, King Wenceslaus of Hungary, wearing a princely cap. As the name Wenceslaus was not commonly used among the Hungarians, King Wenceslaus was called Ladislaus.
Page 134	The Priests of Buda Curse the Pope	The Priests of Buda Curse the Pope; The double excommunication of Buda (1304–1307). According to the chronicle, the papal legate, Cardinal Nicola Boccasini (the future Pope Benedict XI), arrived in Hungary to support King Charles Robert during the dynastic conflict that arose following the extinction of the male line of the Hungarian royal Árpád dynasty, when the claimants descended through the female line competed for the support of the Hungarian magnates factions. However, he was unable to accomplish his mission. Upon his departure, he placed the citizens of Buda under an ecclesiastical interdict. In protest, some priests of Buda excommunicated the Pope. In the miniature, two priests from Buda stand in front of a church with a bell tower. One holds a burning candle and rings a bell, while the other points with his hand toward Cardinal Nicola of the Dominican Order seated on the ground.
Page 135	Recovery of the Lost Crown	Recovery of the Lost Crown; The loss and finding of the crown (1305). According to the chronicle, Duke Otto of Bavaria obtained the Holy Crown of Hungary from Wenceslaus, who had returned to Bohemia, and brought it to Hungary. Fearing his enemies, he concealed the crown inside a wooden drinking vessel. During the journey, the vessel was lost, but it was eventually found. In the miniature, the already crowned Otto, King of Hungary, is depicted on the right, riding a white horse. One of his attendants picks up the wooden drinking vessel from the road, in which the crown had been hidden, and with his other hand is already handing the crown to the King. Meanwhile, the sons of Henry and certain other nobles brought Otto, duke of Bavaria, into Hungary to be king... From there he went to Buda, and on the feast day of Christmas, in royal robes and with the Holy Crown upon his head, he rode through the streets and squares among a great throng of people, showing everyone that he was the rightful king. Soon afterwards, he visited Transylvania together with Beke, son of Thomas, but there he was captured by the Voivode Ladislas, who kept him chained in his castle for many days. His fate having thus taken such a wretched turn, he was expelled from the kingdom of the Hungarians... For what else should I understand by the loss of the crown, if not that the prince was unable to wear the crown for the rest of his life, but lost from his head both the crown and his honor? What does it mean that no one found it, except those who carried it away? Only this: that Pannonia cannot lose the crown given to her by an angel. — Mark of Kalt, Illuminated Chronicle
Page 136	Cardinal Gentile Arrives in Hungary	Cardinal Gentile Arrives in Hungary; The cardinal's arrival (1308). The papal legate, Cardinal Gentile, rides a white horse, wearing the habit of the Franciscan Order and a cardinal's hat. He is accompanied by a priest and two men in secular dress.
Page 137	Battle of Rozgony	Battle of Rozgony; The Battle of Rozgony (1312). The battle was the most significant engagement of King Charles I of Hungary's campaign to reunify Kingdom of Hungary. In this battle, fought on the field near Rozgony (now Rozhanovce, Slovakia) close to Kassa (now Košice, Slovakia), the king defeated the army of the family of Palatine Amade Aba. The Illuminated Chronicle describes it as the fiercest battle fought since the Mongol invasions of Hungary. Although the royal army also suffered heavy losses, King Charles Robert's decisive victory brought an end to the Aba family's dominance in northeastern Hungary, weakened his most powerful internal rival, Matthew Csák, the magnate who ruled northwestern Hungary, and firmly consolidated Charles Robert's reign throughout the kingdom. Through his maternal line, Charles Robert was one of the heirs of the ruling House of Árpád, which had only recently become extinct in the male line. In the miniature, the battle is depicted taking place in a valley between two rocky hills, with the castle of Kassa standing on the heights. In the foreground lie the bloodied bodies of fallen warriors. On the right, King Charles Robert rides a white horse in full armor, wearing a crown and a visored helmet adorned with the crest of the Hungarian Angevins. His breastplate bears the Hungarian coat of arms with the double cross. His similarly decorated banner lies on the ground in the hand of his fallen standard-bearer, Györke. In his left hand, the king carries a shield displaying the fleur-de-lis of the House of Anjou, while in the background, beneath the royal Hungarian Angevin banner, the relieving army arrives to support him. On the left, the opposing commander – presumably one of Aba Amadé's sons – also wearing a closed helmet, is shown engaged in single combat with the king.
Page 138	King Charles Robert	King Charles Robert; King Charles I of Hungary is depicted in full armor, wearing the royal crown over his kettle hat. He holds the orb in his right hand and a lowered shield bearing the royal Hungarian Angevin coat of arms in his left.
Page 139	The First Wife of King Charles Robert, Mary Is Placed in a Coffin	The First Wife of King Charles Robert, Mary Is Placed in a Coffin; The queen's funeral (1317). A man places the body of Queen Mary, the first wife of King Charles I of Hungary, into a coffin, while two bishops officiate at the funeral rites.
Page 139	The Wedding of King Charles Robert With Elizabeth, the Daughter of the Polish King Władysław	The Wedding of King Charles Robert With Elizabeth, the Daughter of the Polish King Władysław; The royal wedding (1320). Elizabeth, daughter of Władysław I Łokietek, King of Poland, and the third wife of Charles Robert of Hungary. On the left, two elderly figures lead the richly dressed Elizabeth, wearing a golden crown. On the right, facing her, the king extends the queen's crown toward her. At the far right, two heralds blow trumpets from which hang royal banners bearing the Hungarian Angevin coat of arms.
Page 140	Queen Elizabeth With Her Children	Queen Elizabeth With Her Children; In the center is Queen Elizabeth, the consort of King Charles I of Hungary, surrounded by her five children. On the left stand two boys wearing royal crowns: the future King Louis I of Hungary and his younger brother, Prince Andrew, heir to the throne of the Kingdom of Naples. On the right are three boys wearing princely caps: Stephen, Duke of Slavonia; Charles, who died in infancy; and Ladislaus, who died at the age of five. According to another interpretation, the two figures on the right represent the royal couple's daughters: Catherine, Duchess of Świdnica, and Elizabeth.
Page 140	The Founding of the Monastery in Lippa	The Founding of the Monastery in Lippa; Kneeling opposite each other, King Charles Robert of Hungary and Queen Elizabeth hold a miniature model of the church at Lippa (now Lipova, Romania). in their hands as a symbol of its foundation.
Page 140	Saint Louis of Toulouse	Saint Louis of Toulouse; Saint Louis of Toulouse (Louis of Anjou, Bishop of Toulouse) is depicted with a halo. The clasp fastening his liturgical cope across his chest bears the Hungarian Angevin coat of arms. The saint was a maternal descendant of the House of Árpád: his mother was Mary, daughter of King Stephen V of Hungary. He raises his right hand in blessing, while the royal crown lies at his feet, symbolizing his renunciation of the Kingdom of Naples when he chose an ecclesiastical vocation.
Page 140	Birth of King Louis	Birth of King Louis; Birth of King Louis I of Hungary (1326). The son of King Charles I of Hungary's was named Louis after the king's paternal uncle, Saint Louis of Toulouse, who was canonized in 1317. Queen Elizabeth is depicted lying in bed, wearing a crown, while one of the three female attendants presents the crowned infant Louis to his mother. In the year of our Lord 1326, on March 7, a son was born to the king, whom, in his joy, he named Louis after his holy confessor kinsman. — Mark of Kalt, Illuminated Chronicle
Page 141	Birth of King Louis	The Burning of the Coronation Basilica at Székesfehérvár; The burning of the Coronation Basilica (1327). The Basilica of the Assumption of the Blessed Virgin Mary at Székesfehérvár was the largest and most important church of the medieval Kingdom of Hungary. In the miniature, flames rise from three of the four towers and the lead-covered roof of the Romanesque basilica. According to the chronicle, the fourth tower, which stood above the sacristy, did not burn down because the holy relics were kept there.
Page 141	Felician Záh's Assassination Against the Royal Family	Felician Záh's Assassination Against the Royal Family; The assassination attempt against the Hungarian royal family (1330). In one of the chambers of the royal palace in Visegrád, King Charles Robert and Queen Elizabeth are seated at a table lavishly set with dishes and tableware. The elderly Felician Záh wounds the queen's right hand with his sword as she attempts to shield the king. However, John, the royal carver, rushes in and stabs the assassin from behind. Meanwhile, on the left, a servant is just entering the room carrying a platter of food. At this time, when Hungary was rejoicing in the desired tranquillity of peace, and was disturbed by no enemy from anywhere, the devil, the breaker of peace and sower of hatred, entered the heart of a nobleman named Felician of the Záh kindred... he should kill with his sword, King Charles, his lord, Queen Elizabeth, and their two sons, Louis and Andrew... Felician approached the king's table unnoticed, he drew his sharp sword and, with the fury of a rabid dog, suddenly attacked the king, intending mercilessly to kill the king, the queen, and their sons. But the mercy of the gracious God did not allow him to carry out his intention. He did lightly wound the king’s right hand, but, alas, he immediately struck off four fingers of the most saintly queen's right hand, the fingers with which she distributed alms to the poor, the suffering, and the wretched... the queen's deputy cupbearer, rushed at Felician like a bloodthirsty beast. He struck him hard with his pickaxe between the neck and the shoulder blade, cutting through him and bringing him down. Then the king's warriors, forcing their way in through the doors from every side, hacked the wretched man to pieces with their terrible swords, cutting him limb by limb and dismembering him like a monster. His head was sent to Buda, and his hands and feet to other cities. Then his only son and his faithful servant – who had fled but could not escape – were tied to the tails of horses and dragged to their deaths. Their bodies and bones were devoured by dogs in the street. It was indeed fitting that Felician should be torn apart limb by limb, for he himself had cruelly mutilated the bodies of many Christians, and that he should not die in a human manner, but, being a dog, should die like a dog, struck down suddenly like a hound, he who had continually oppressed the poor. They also dragged his daughter, a beautiful young maiden named Clara, from the royal court. Her nose and lips were mutilated so cruelly that only her teeth could be seen, eight fingers were also cut off from her two hands, leaving only her thumbs. Half-dead, she was dragged on horseback through the streets of several towns, and the wretched girl was forced to cry out: "Thus shall suffer whoever is unfaithful to the king!" Felician also had an elder daughter named Sebe, who was the wife of a nobleman named Kopaj. By order of Emeric Becsei, the castellan there, she was beheaded before the castle of Léva, while Kopaj was imprisoned for life. Moreover, his sons were sent with the crusading knights to an island in the sea, so that they would never see their homeland again. Finally, many nobles of Felician's kindred were massacred. Thus the wretched Felician fell into the crime of treason against the king, threw the kingdom into turmoil, extinguished his own descendants, brought disgrace upon and destroyed his own kindred, and became food for dogs. As he departed from this world, he fell into the chains of the underworld and became fuel for Hell, a byword to the world and a warning to the unfaithful. — Mark of Kalt, Illuminated Chronicle
Page 143	The Defeat of King Charles in the Campaign Against Basarab	King Charles's Defeat in the Campaign Against Basarab; The Battle of Posada (1330). It was a fierce four-day battle during the campaign of King Charles I of Hungary in Wallachia. The Hungarian army, deliberately lured into a trap in a narrow mountain pass, was defeated by Basarab I, the Wallachian voivode. In the miniature, Vlachs dressed in traditional woollen garments and fur caps roll rocks down from above and shoot arrows at the Hungarian army as it marches through a rocky gorge between high mountains. Part of the Hungarian force is killed, including the Count of Sopron, Dezső Hédervári, who had put on the king's armour and his crowned helmet decorated with an ostrich head in order to cover the king's escape. King Charles I is shown in the foreground fleeing on a white horse with two loyal followers. He wears a crown and carries a shield bearing the Hungarian coat of arms with the double cross. The painter of the illustrations in the chronicle must have seen them with his own eyes and was therefore well acquainted with the dress of the Hungarians, Cumans, and Vlachs.
Page 144	King Charles Receives the Envoy of Voivode Basarab	King Charles Receives the Envoy of Voivode Basarab; King Charles I of Hungary is depicted wearing armor. Before him stands a messenger with long hair and a long robe, holding a helmet in his left hand while presenting a letter from Voivode Basarab to the Hungarian king. (The event depicted in this miniature precedes the Battle of Posada shown in the previous illustration). The king captured Severin and the castle of Severin... After this had happened, Basarab sent respectable envoys to the king with this message: "You have labored, my lord king, to gather your army, therefore, for your trouble, I will pay you seven thousand marks of silver in compensation. I will also peacefully surrender Severin, together with all that belongs to it, which you have taken by force. Moreover, I will faithfully pay every year the tribute that I owe to your crown, and I will send one of my sons to your court, at my own expense, to serve you. Only return in peace and do not bring your men into danger, for if you come any farther, you will not escape danger." Hearing this, the king, in his arrogance, spoke these words to the envoys: "Tell Basarab: He is the shepherd of my sheep, I will drag him by his beard from his hiding place!" — Mark of Kalt, Illuminated Chronicle
Page 146	Victory of Basarab Over the Royal Army	Victory of Basarab Over the Royal Army; The Battle of Posada (1330). It was a fierce four-day battle during the campaign of King Charles I of Hungary in Wallachia. The Hungarian army, deliberately lured into a trap in a narrow mountain pass, was defeated by Basarab I, the Wallachian voivode. A repetition of the scene depicted on page 143: the Vlachs, dressed in fur coats and fur caps, roll rocks down from above and shoot arrows at the Hungarian troops marching below. On the right, in the foreground, King Charles Robert flees on horseback with his soldiers.

== See also ==
- List of Hungarian chronicles
- Gesta Hungarorum
- Gesta Hunnorum et Hungarorum
- Buda Chronicle
- Chronica Hungarorum – Thuróczy Chronicle
- Epitome rerum Hungarorum
- Nádasdy Mausoleum
- Hunor and Magor
- Seven chieftains of the Magyars
- Turul
- Árpád dynasty
- Principality of Hungary
- Kingdom of Hungary (1000–1301)

== Sources ==
- Studies on the Illuminated Chronicle (2018). Bak, János M.; Veszprémy, László (eds.). Studies on the Illuminated Chronicle. Budapest: Central European University Press, National Széchényi Library. ISBN 978-963-386-261-2. ISSN 1419-7782.
