= Abaújvár =

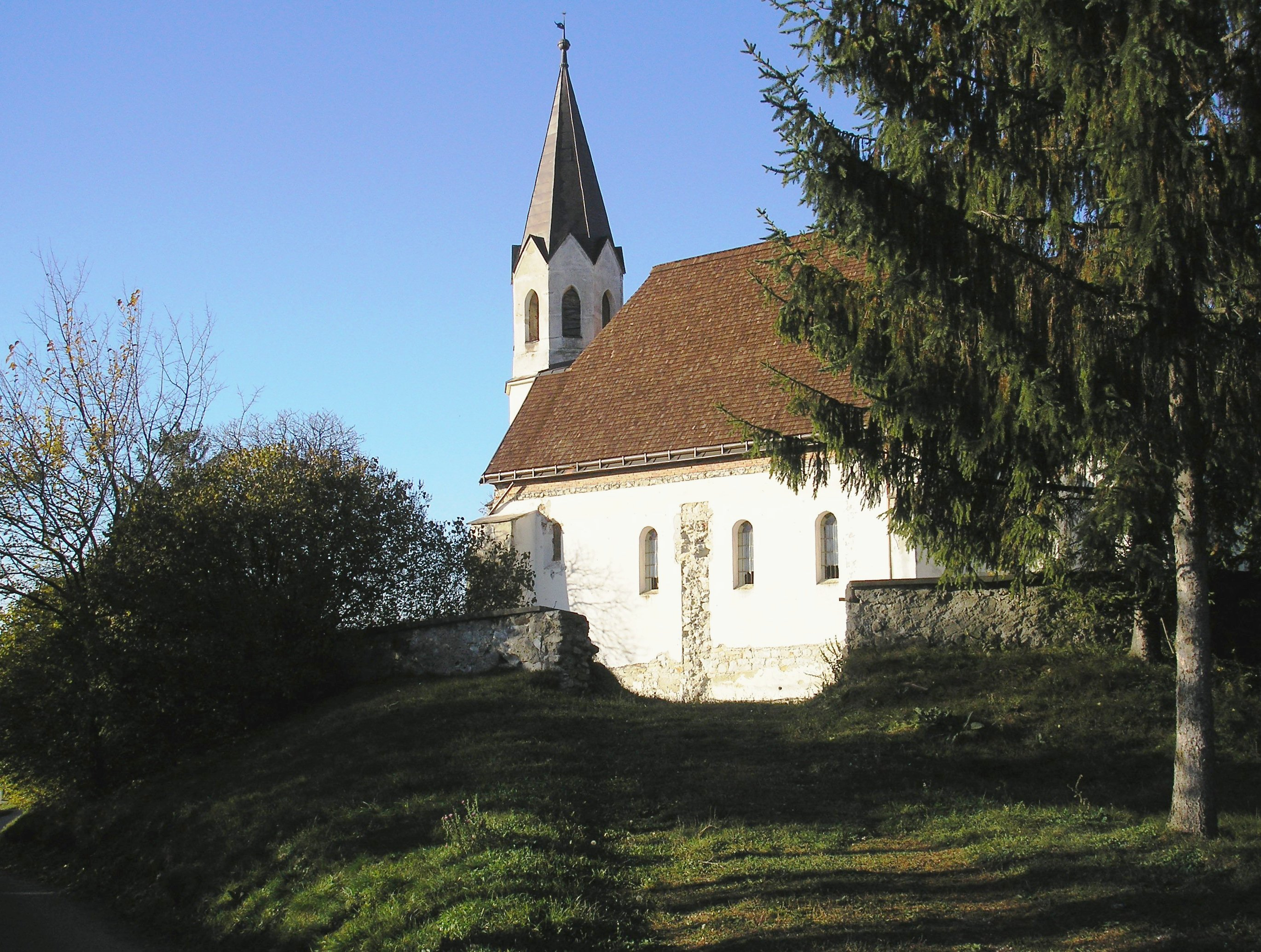

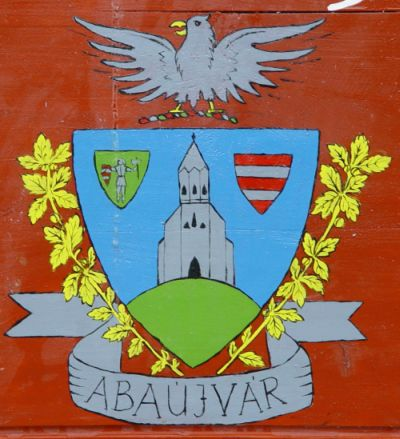
- Coat of arms

- Location of Abaújvár
- Coordinates: 48.52642°N 21.31545°E
- Country: Hungary
- County: Borsod-Abaúj-Zemplén
- Subregion: Metro Inter-Mountain

Government
  - Mayor: Pál Csuha (Independent)

Area
  - Total: 7.32 km^{2} (2.83 sq mi)

Population (2001)
  - Total: 330
  - Density: 45.08/km^{2} (116.8/sq mi)
- Time zone: UTC+1 (CET)
  - Summer (DST): UTC+2 (CEST)
- Postal code: 3898
- Area code: 46

Abaújvár is a village in northeastern Hungary, next to the Slovak border. It lies 72 km (45 mi) northeast of Miskolc, and 18 km south of Košice (Kassa), Slovakia.

== Name ==
The first part of the name shows that the medieval castle was owned by the Aba genus. Nearby was an obsolete hillfort called Óvár, meaning "old castle", that's why the second part of the name is -újvár, meaning "new castle".

== History ==
In addition to Gyöngyöspata in Heves County, from the 11th–14th centuries Abaújvár Castle was the main place of residence for the Aba family, the second ethnic royal house of Hungary and one of the most important Hungarian families of the time. The first known written record pertaining to Abaújvár dates back to 1046, but presumably an earth castle stood here much earlier. The new stone castle was built by King Samuel Aba.

In the years that followed the bloodiest battle of the Medieval Hungary, the Battle of Rozgony, the castle of Abaújvár became more or less a place of bad memories for the Aba family. June 15, 1312 fell on a Thursday, so during the following two days all efforts were made to make certain that the wounded and the bodies of the dead be brought from the Rozgony battlefield, some 18 km away, to Abaújvár for care and burial before Sunday, the Lord's day. By the end of the month some eight hundred bodies were buried within the inner yard of the castle grounds. Perhaps it was because of this that the new king, Charles Robert of Anjou, had a very hard time to find a new master for the place. Shortly thereafter the story of the haunted castle developed into a legend.

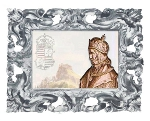
King Samuel Aba of Hungary

In 1345, King Charles Robert's Sicilian supporters, Nicholas, Philip, and William Drugeth, gave Abaújvár to the Augustinians Friars. However, since the Drugeth brothers never owned the property in the first place, the property was taken away from the Augustinians in 1351, and during the same year, with the approval of the king, the Augustinian Order received the village Monyhád in Sáros County (Mochnya, present-day Slovakia).

In 1394, the castle and the surrounding land was given by Sigismund, Holy Roman Emperor into a trust and the care of a minor local aristocratic family under the condition that they would finance additional fortification of the Abaújvár Castle. While the Perényi family gained local importance after the Battle of Rozgony by giving their support to King Charles Robert of Anjou against the Aba, unfortunately even several decades later they were not in a financial position to carry on with needed fortification. Eventually King Sigismund's treasury allocated some funds for the fortification of the castle; however, the Perényi used the money to build for themselves a family chateau on their own estate. This mistake proved to be dear for the realm itself. In 1441, when Jan Zizka, a Czech Hussite warlord seized Abaújvár for ransom, the Perényi family could not raise even a small portion of the 24,000 gold ducats demanded by Hussite rebels.

During the Middle Ages, the castle was located on an important trade route within the Kingdom of Hungary leading to the northern neighboring Kingdom of Poland (1025–1385). However, after the Battle of Mohács (August 29, 1526) the Abaújvár Castle lost its military significance and became of lesser importance.

The first squatters and settlers started to build their mud-houses under the castle walls during early seventeen hundreds. The 1715 census shows 18 inhabitants residing in 6 mud-households located under the castle walls.

By 1870 there were already 737 inhabitants living in the village.

Abaújvár Census

| Year | Pop. | ±% |
|---|---|---|
| 1880 | 838 | — |
| 1890 | 761 | −9.2% |
| 1900 | 796 | +4.6% |
| 1910 | 763 | −4.1% |
| 1920 | 783 | +2.6% |

| Year | Pop. | ±% |
|---|---|---|
| 1930 | 751 | −4.1% |
| 1941 | 724 | −3.6% |
| 1949 | 768 | +6.1% |
| 1960 | 726 | −5.5% |
| 1970 | 640 | −11.8% |

| Year | Pop. | ±% |
|---|---|---|
| 1980 | 403 | −37.0% |
| 1990 | 328 | −18.6% |
| 2001 | 326 | −0.6% |

== The last two centuries ==
The proximity (18 km) to the city of Kassa (Košice in present-day Slovakia), has made Abaújvár a place of interest for many settlers. The 19th and 20th century exodus of Jews from Poland, Ukraine, and Russia made up a significant portion of the new population. The 20th-century land reforms became also an incentive for displaced and poverty-stricken people from other parts of Felvidek (a northern part of the Hungarian Realm). On the one hand the population growth brought prosperity to the region; on the other hand the newcomers greatly contributed to the devastation of the historical appearance of Abaújvár. Within less than 100 years of continued construction of new residential homes, the local population had totally dismantled the entire castle and its fortification walls to use the stone as a raw material for building their houses, destroying one of Hungary's most important historical sites. What was once a center of the Second Hungarian ethnic Royal House (the House of Aba) and the pride of the Hungarian statehood became nothing more than an unmarked cemetery, which, even today, the majority of Hungarians are not aware of.

When we try to analyze the devastation of Abaújvár Castle, the most diplomatic explanation one can offer is that the 19th and 20th century war conditions and the lack of appropriate laws relating to the protection of historical sites in Hungary during the Habsburg rule had a great deal to do with what happened to Abaújvár.

To this day the castle and the village bear Samuel Aba's name, and it actually means "Aba's New Castle." On the surface the castle does not exist any more; however, attempts are on the way to repair the castle hilltop with stone retaining walls. The local historical society intends to rebuild some of the original wood fortification, main castle gate, and old castle church. The castle gave its name to the historical Abaúj county (now a part of Borsod-Abaúj-Zemplén).

At the present time the castle grounds provide a resting place to several key members of the Aba family and another eight hundred knights slain during the Battle of Rozgony on June 15, 1312.

== Infrastructure ==
=== Highways and roads ===
Abaújvár is accessible primarily via regional roads connecting to major routes. Traveling from Budapest, Miskolc, Hungary, or Košice, the primary route involves taking European Route E71/E75 to Hidasnémeti, located 4 km south of the Slovak – Hungarian border. From Hidasnémeti, the route leads east toward Gönc, turning north past the town Szujta to reach Abaújvár. Additional rural and mountain roads approach the village from the south, east, and north through access via these secondary routes can be limited during winter months. Fuel services are available in Gönc and across the border in Kechnec, Slovakia. Regional public transportation is provided by local bus services operating on limited schedules.

=== Rail system ===
There is a major international train artery through Hidasnémeti.

=== Air services ===
Košice International Airport is located 20 km from Abaújvár.

=== Medical services ===
Abaújvár has a local dentist, and limited medical services are offered at the Gönc Medical Center. The closest hospital is in Szikszó on the Highway E79 / E71, just 12 km north of Miskolc. The city of Miskolc has a regional hospital.

=== Local infrastructure ===
The residents of the village of Abaújvár enjoy natural gas connection to their houses, running water, and a central sewerage system. There is no post office in the village and there is only a small convenience store run by a local person that mostly carries very limited food stock, but sells various alcohol and beer over the counter. There is no school in town. The community provides subsidized food catering service, including delivery, to its seniors.

== Sources ==
- Kristó, Gyula - Makk, Ferenc: Az Árpád-ház uralkodói (IPC Könyvek, 1996)
- Korai Magyar Történeti Lexikon (9-14. század), főszerkesztő: Kristó, Gyula, szerkesztők: Engel, Pál és Makk, Ferenc (Akadémiai Kiadó, Budapest, 1994)
- Siebmachers Wappenbuch Die Wappen des Adels von Ungarn

== See also ==
- Abaújvár Royal Historical Society
- List of rulers of Hungary
- Battle of Rozgony
- Samuel Aba, King of Hungary
- Nearby villages: Kéked (3 km), Pányok (4 km), Zsujta (2 km)
- Nearest town: Gönc (12 km)
