= Battle of Ménfő =

Battle restoring Peter Orseolo to the Hungarian throne

Coordinates: 47°41′3″N 17°38′4″E

- Part of German-Hungarian War
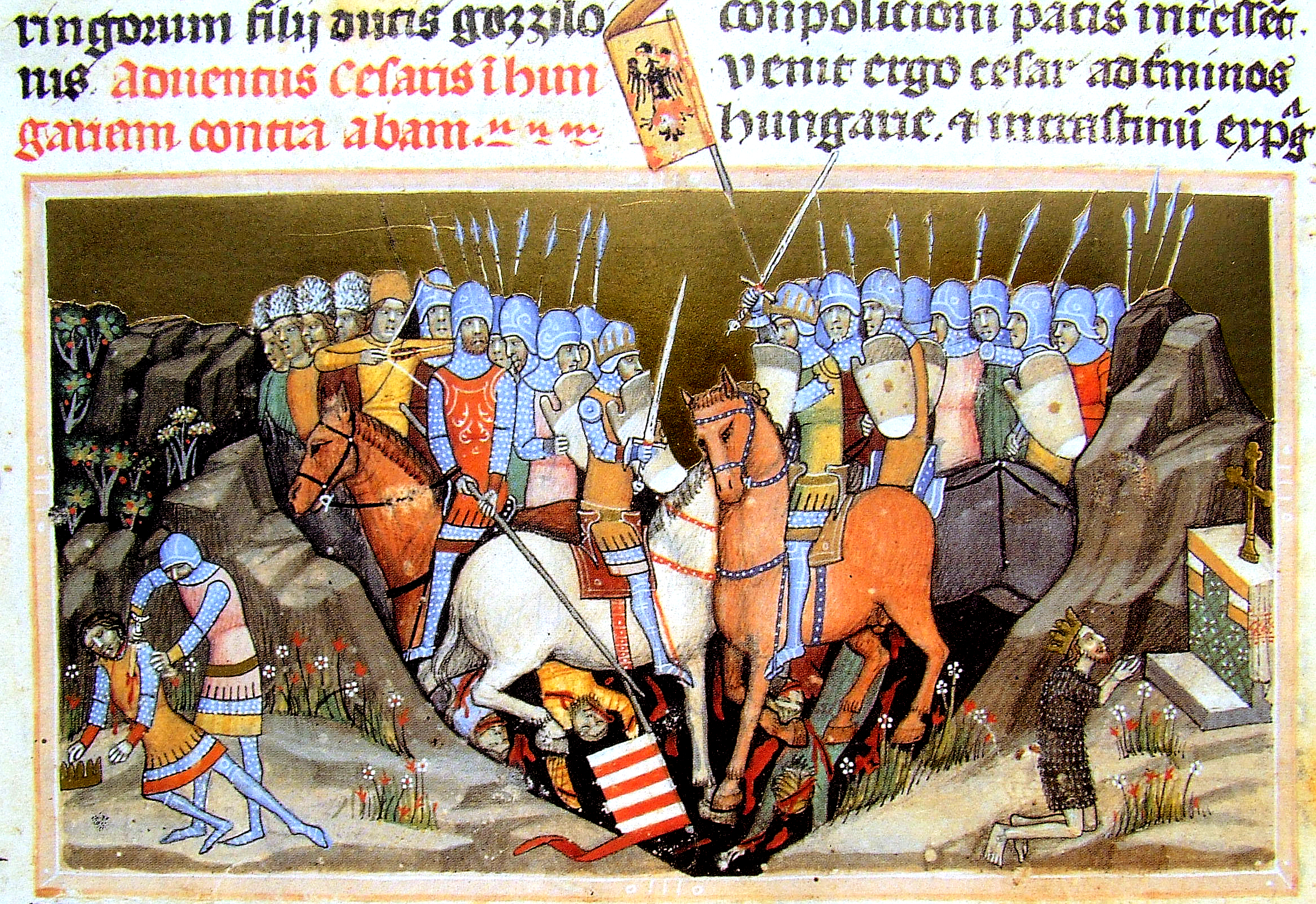
- Battle of Ménfő. In the corner of the picture is a depiction of the killing of Samuel Aba (Chronicon Pictum)
Date	5 June 1044
Location	Ménfő, Hungary
Result	German victory Peter Orseolo becomes King of Hungary

Belligerents
Holy Roman Empire: Kingdom of Germany; Hungarian supporters of Peter Orseolo	Hungarian supporters of Samuel Aba

Commanders and leaders
Henry III; Peter Orseolo	Samuel Aba †

Strength
Unknown	Unknown

Casualties and losses
Light	Heavy

The Battle of Ménfő was an important battle in the early history of the Kingdom of Hungary. Fought in 1044 at Ménfő, near Győr, between an army of mostly Germans and Hungarians (Magyars), it was a victory for the Germans and thus for Westernising influences in Hungary.

Peter Orseolo, who had been deposed by Samuel Aba in 1041, returned with the assistance of Emperor Henry III, and invaded Hungary in June 1044. His force was small and the Hungarian army of Samuel Aba was large. However, there was disaffection in the Hungarian ranks and the army quickly fell apart in the face of the German cavalry. Samuel fled the field, but was captured and killed. Peter was reinstalled as king at Székesfehérvár and did homage for his kingdom to Henry. The leading magnates and the less important nobles all came to Henry to make oaths of fidelity and vassalage. Hungary was made a vassal of the Holy Roman Empire, though it was not to remain so for long.

== Bibliography ==
- Gwatkin, H. M., Whitney, J. P. (ed) et al. The Cambridge Medieval History: Volume III. Cambridge University Press, 1926.
- Négyesi, Lajos (1994). "A ménfői csata [The Battle of Ménfő]". Hadtörténelmi Közlemények (in Hungarian). 107 (3). Hadtörténeti Intézet és Múzeum: 136–146. ISSN 0017-6540.
- Pauler, Gyula (1899). A magyar nemzet története az Árpád-házi királyok alatt, I. [The History of the Hungarian Nation during the Árpádian Kings, Vol. 1.] (in Hungarian). Athenaeum.
- Polgár, Balázs (2016). "III. Henrik 1044. évi magyarországi hadjárata és a ménfői csata [The Hungarian Campaign of Henry III and the Battle of Ménfő in 1044]". In Pósán, László; Veszprémy, László (eds.). Elfeledett háborúk. Középkori csaták és várostromok (6–16. század) (in Hungarian). Zrínyi Kiadó. pp. 149–161. ISBN 978-963-3276-96-9.
