= Zámoly =

- Flag Coat of arms

- Location of Fejér county in Hungary

- Location of Zámoly
- Coordinates: 47.31770°N 18.40763°E
- Country: Hungary
- County: Fejér

Area
  - Total: 48.5 km^{2} (18.7 sq mi)

Population (2004)
  - Total: 2,216
  - Density: 45.69/km^{2} (118.3/sq mi)
- Time zone: UTC+1 (CET)
  - Summer (DST): UTC+2 (CEST)
- Postal code: 8081
- Area code: 22
- Website: www.zamoly.hu

Zámoly is a village in Fejér county, Hungary.

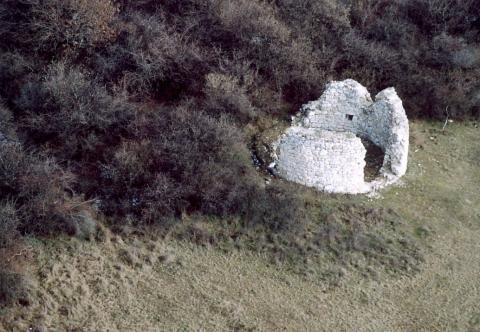
Zámoly, ruins from above
