= Samuel Aba =

King of Hungary from 1041 to 1044

Samuel
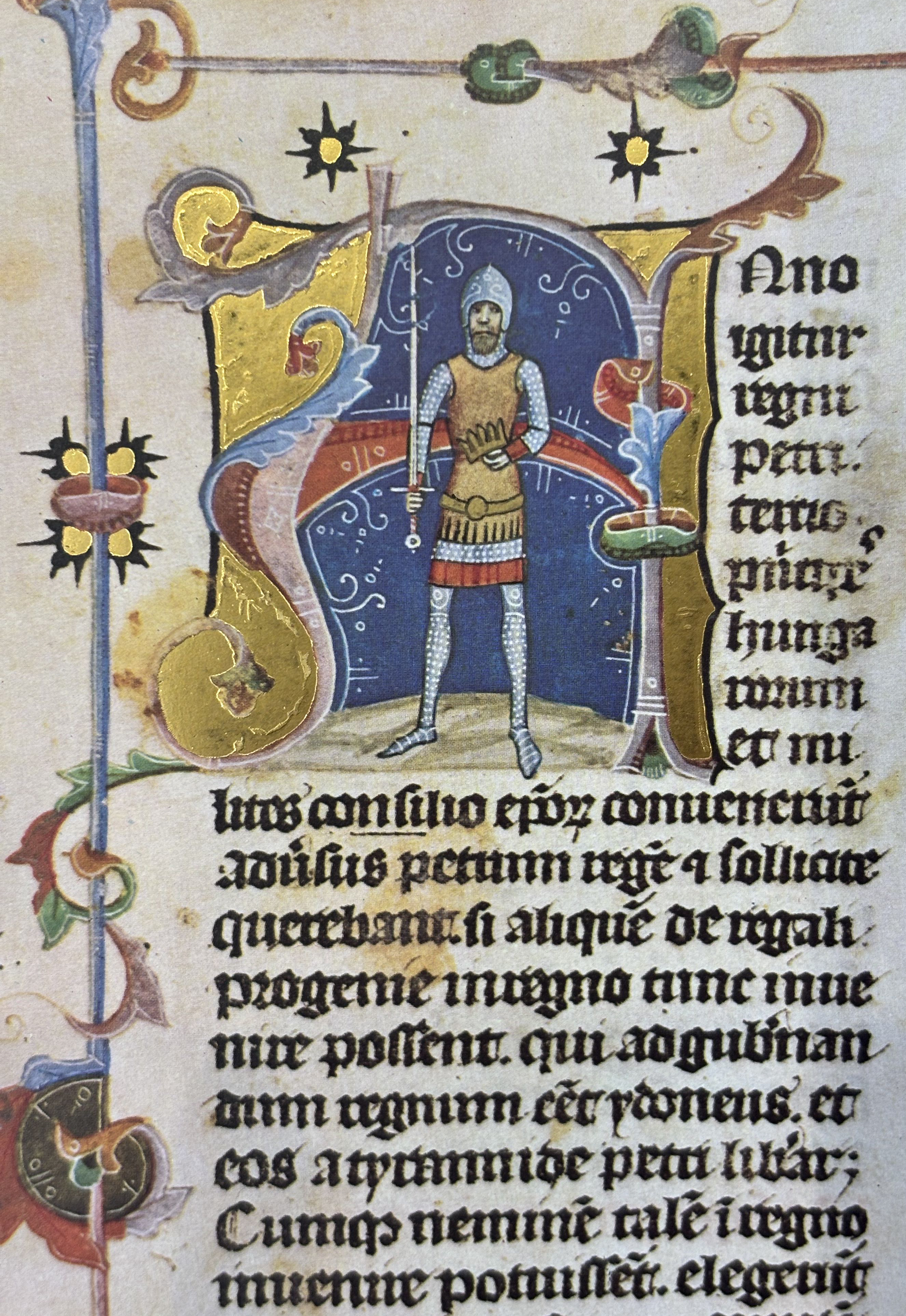
- Depicted in the Illuminated Chronicle

King of Hungary
- Reign: September 1041 – 5 July 1044
- Coronation: 22 April 1044, Csanád
- Predecessor: Peter
- Successor: Peter
- Born: before 990 or c. 1009
- Died: 5 July 1044
- Burial: Abasár, Hungary
- House: House of Aba
- Religion: Chalcedonian Christianity prev. Tengrism or Judaism

Samuel Aba (Hungarian: Aba Sámuel; before 990 or c. 1009 – 5 July 1044) reigned as King of Hungary between 1041 and 1044. He was born to a prominent family with extensive domains in the region of the Mátra Hills. Based on reports in the Gesta Hungarorum and other Hungarian chronicles about the non-Hungarian origin of the Aba family, modern historians write that the Abas headed the Kabar tribes that seceded from the Khazar Khaganate and joined the Hungarians in the 9th century.

Around 1009, Samuel or his father married a sister of Stephen I, the first King of Hungary. Thereafter the originally pagan or Jewish (because of the Khazar elite link) Aba family converted to Christianity. King Stephen appointed Samuel to head the royal court as his palatine. However, the king died in 1038, and the new monarch, Peter the Venetian, removed Samuel from his post.

The Hungarian lords dethroned Peter in 1041 and elected Ispán Samuel as king. According to the unanimous narration of the Hungarian chronicles, Samuel preferred commoners to noblemen, causing discontent among his former partisans. His execution of many opponents brought him into conflict with Bishop Gerard of Csanád. In 1044, Peter the Venetian returned with the assistance of the German monarch, Henry III, who defeated Samuel's larger army at the battle of Ménfő near Győr. Samuel fled from the battlefield but was captured and killed.

== Origins and early life ==
According to the anonymous author of the Gesta Hungarorum, Samuel's family descended from two "Cuman" chieftains, Ed and Edemen, who received "a great land in the forest of Mátra" from Árpád, Grand Prince of the Hungarians around 900. The 13th-century historian Simon of Kéza, and the 14th-century Hungarian chronicles describe the Aba kindred as descendants of Csaba (himself a son of Attila the Hun) by a lady from Khwarezm. Since all Hungarian chronicles emphasize the Oriental – either "Cuman" or "Khwarezmian" – origin of the Abas, Gyula Kristó, László Szegfű and other historians propose that the Aba clan descending from them ruled the Kabars, a people of Khazar origin who joined the Hungarians in the middle of the 9th century, before the Hungarians' arrival in the Carpathian Basin around 895. Kristó argues that both Samuel's Khazar origin and his first name suggest that he was born to a family that adhered to Judaism.

Despite the uncertainty over the clan's origins, Samuel undoubtedly descended from a distinguished family, since an unnamed sister of Stephen I, who had in 1000 or 1001 been crowned the first King of Hungary, was given in marriage to a member of the Aba clan around 1009. However, historians still debate whether Samuel himself or Samuel's father married the royal princess. If Samuel was her husband, he must have been born before 990 and converted – either from Judaism or paganism – to Christianity when he married Stephen I's sister. His Christian credentials are further evidenced by Samuel's establishment of an abbey at Abasár which was recorded by Hungarian chronicles. According to Gyula Kristó and other historians, Samuel's conversion coincided with the creation of the Roman Catholic Diocese of Eger encompassing his domains.

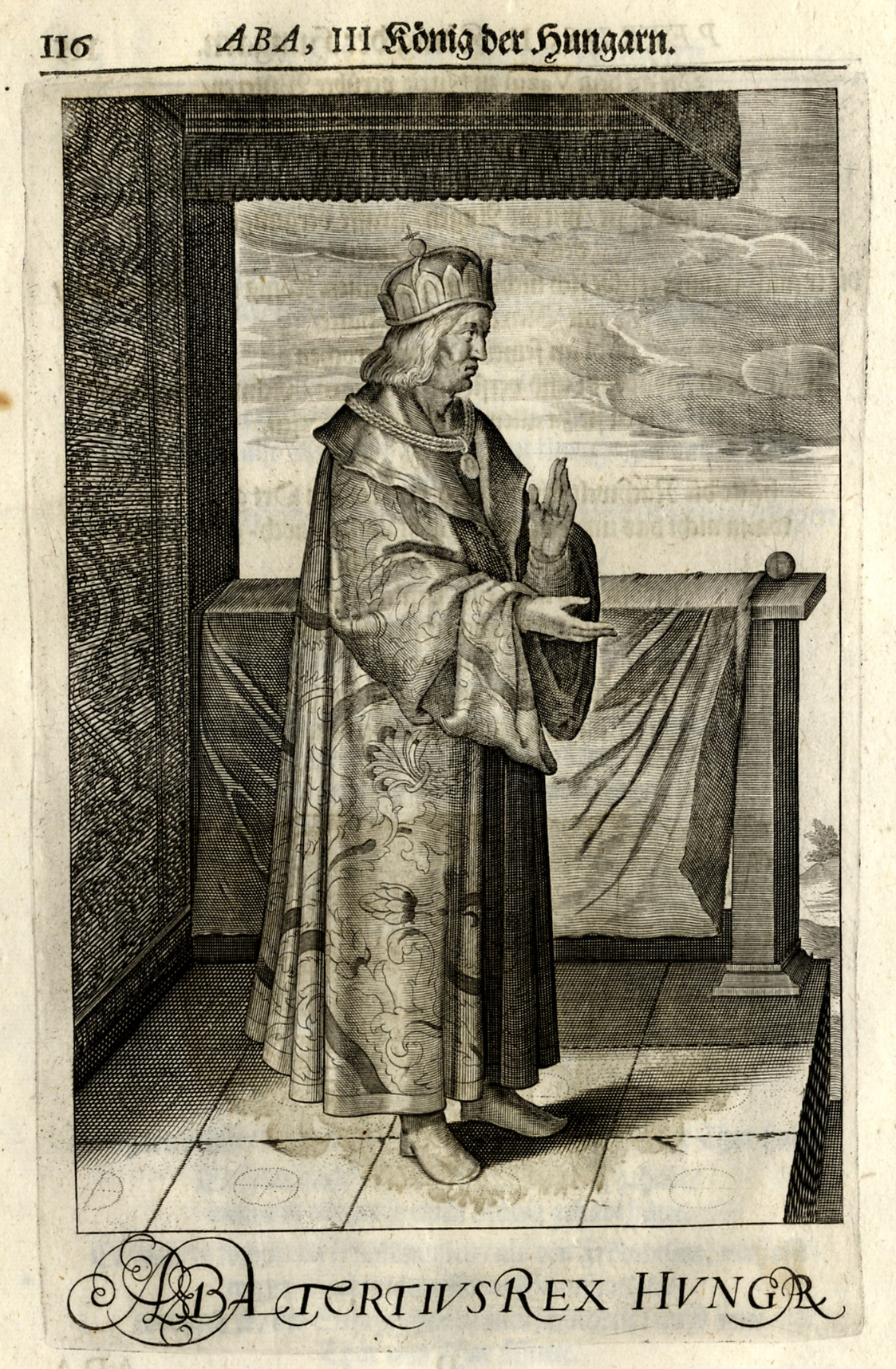
Samuel Aba, King of Hungary (Nádasdy Mausoleum, 1664)

Samuel held important offices during the reign of King Stephen. Pál Engel proposes that Abaújvár ("Aba's new castle") was named after him, implying that he was also the first ispán, or head, of that fortress and the county surrounding it. Samuel was a member of the royal council and became the first palatine of Hungary. The death of King Stephen on 15 August 1038 led to his nephew, Peter Orseolo of Venice, ascending to the throne. The new monarch preferred his German and Italian courtiers and set aside the native lords, including Samuel. In 1041, discontented Hungarian noblemen expelled King Peter in a coup d'état and elected Samuel king.

== King of Hungary ==
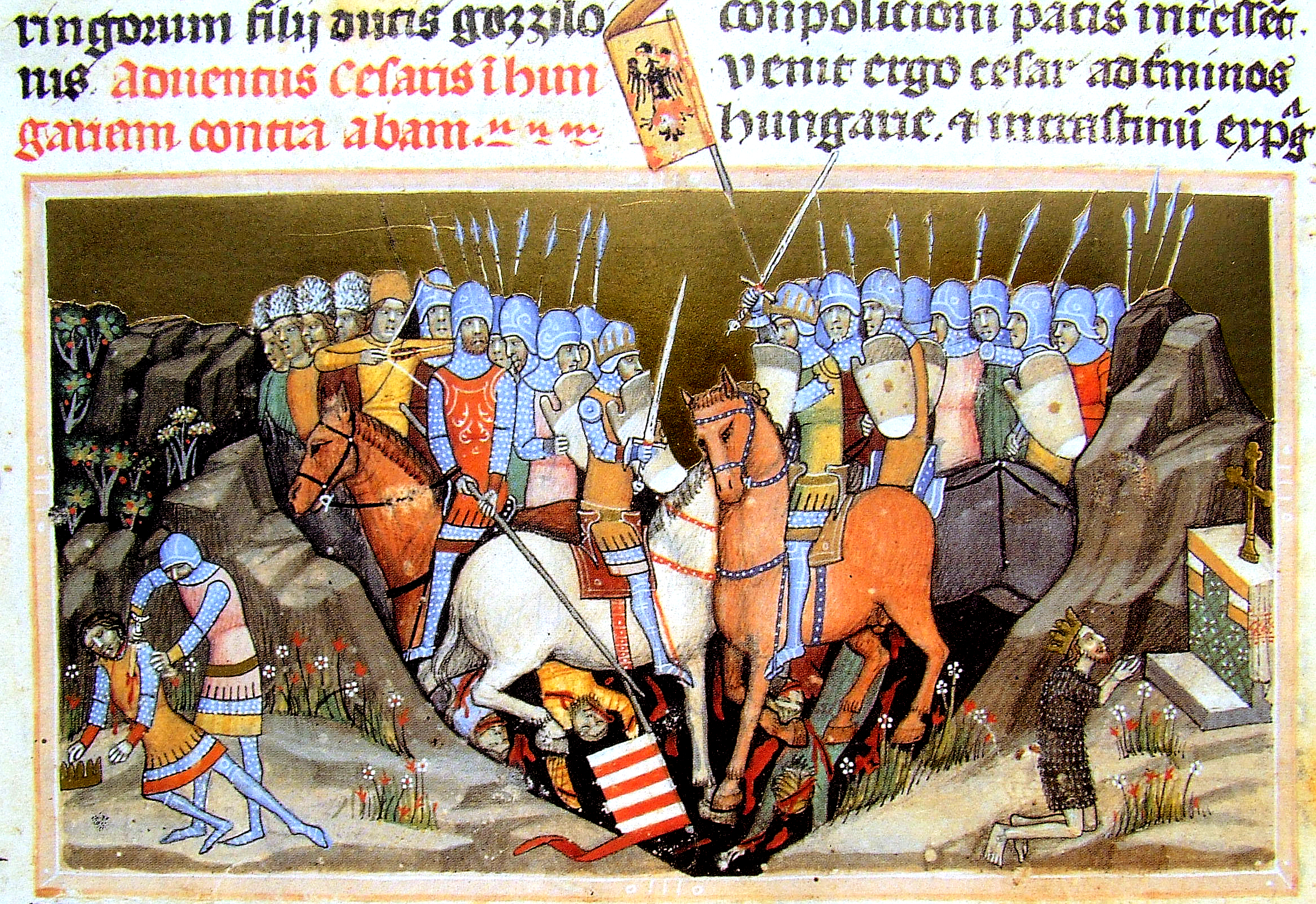
Samuel's defeat by Henry III, Holy Roman Emperor in the Battle of Ménfő in 1044 (from the Illuminated Chronicle)

... King Aba became insolent and began to rage cruelly against the Hungarians. For he held that all things should be in common between lords and servants; but to have violated his oath he considered a mere trifle. Despising the nobles of the kingdom, he consorted with peasants and commoners. The Hungarian nobles were unwilling to endure this from him, and chafing under this insulting behaviour they conspired and plotted that they would kill him. But one of them informed the King of the conspiracy against his life, whereupon the King imprisoned as many of them as he could and had them put to death without examination or trial, which did great damage to his cause.

— Illuminated Chronicle

Samuel abolished all laws introduced by Peter the Venetian and had many of his predecessor's supporters killed or tortured. The contemporaneous Hermann of Reichenau even called him "the tyrant of Hungary" in his Chronicon. Hungarian chronicles sharply criticized Samuel for socializing with the peasants instead of the nobles. Samuel even abolished some levies payable by the commoners.

Following his ousting, Peter the Venetian took refuge in Germany. In response, Samuel stormed Austria in 1042, provoking a retaliatory invasion by the German monarch, Henry III in 1043. It forced Samuel to renounce all Hungarian territories to the west of the rivers Leitha and Morava as well as agree to the payment of a tribute. The funding of the tribute payment was through new taxes on the Christian prelates and seizure of Church estates. This policy caused discontent even among the members of Samuel's own council. He had a number of his councillors executed during Lent. In order to punish the king, Bishop Gerard of Csanád (modern-day Cenad, Romania) refused to perform the annual ceremony of putting the royal crown upon the monarch's head at Easter.

King Henry III again invaded Hungary in 1044 to restore Peter the Venetian. The decisive battle was fought at Ménfő near Győr, where Samuel's army was routed. Samuel's fate following the battle is still uncertain. According to nearly contemporaneous German sources, he was captured in short order and executed on Peter the Venetian's command. However, 14th-century Hungarian chronicles narrate that he fled up the river Tisza where he was seized and murdered by the locals. The latter sources further state that Samuel was first buried in a nearby church, but was later transferred to his family's monastery at Abasár.

When King Aba had broken his oath and his treaty, King Henry invaded Hungary with a very small force. Aba, who had equipped a very large army, held him in such contempt that he allowed him to enter the province, as though it would be easy to kill or to capture him. Henry, however, trusting in divine help, rapidly crossed the River Raab with part of his force and began the battle, while all the knights rushed hither and thither. In the first attack he defeated and put to flight the innumerable army of the Hungarians, losing very few of his own men. He himself fought very bravely and he won a most glorious victory on 5 July. King Aba narrowly escaped by fleeing, while all the Hungarians rushed in crowds to surrender to King Henry and promised subjection and service. ... Not long afterwards Aba was taken prisoner by King Peter and paid the penalty of his crimes with his head.

— Hermann of Reichenau: Chronicle

== Family ==
No report on the fate of Samuel's widow and children has been preserved. Even so, historians – including Gyula Kristó and László Szegfű – suppose that the powerful Aba family descended from him.

== Genetics ==
Genetic samples from 19 individuals were collected at the necropolis in Abasár, from the political centre of the Aba clan. In 2024, archaeogenetic analysis revealed East Eurasian paternal origin to the Aba royal family of Hungary. It revealed that members of the Aba family were related to members of prominent Hungarian medieval noble families, including the Hungarian royal House of Árpád, the Báthory family, and the Hunyadi family, as well as to the first-generation immigrant elite of the Hungarian conquest, all of which had been previously studied through archaeogenetic analysis. In medieval Hungarian chronicles both the Aba and the Árpád dynasty are identified as descendants of Attila, King of the Hunnic empire. Detailed whole genome sequencing data revealed the paternal ancestry of the Árpád dynasty originating from East Eurasia, with potential Hun connections. In the archaeogenetic study, the Abas also demonstrated Asian Hun (Xiongnu) phylogenetic connections.

== See also ==
- Aba (family)
- Abaújvár

== Sources ==
=== Primary sources ===
- Anonymus, Notary of King Béla: The Deeds of the Hungarians (Edited, Translated and Annotated by Martyn Rady and László Veszprémy). In: Rady, Martyn; Veszprémy, László; Bak, János M. (2010); Anonymus and Master Roger; CEU Press; ISBN 978-963-9776-95-1.
- Herman of Reichenau: Chronicle. In: Eleventh-Century Germany: The Swabian Chronicles (selected sources translated and annotated with an introduction by I. S. Robinson) (2008); Manchester University Press; ISBN 978-0-7190-7734-0.
- The Hungarian Illuminated Chronicle: Chronica de Gestis Hungarorum (Edited by Dezső Dercsényi) (1970). Corvina, Taplinger Publishing. ISBN 0-8008-4015-1.

=== Secondary sources ===
- Bartl, Július; Čičaj, Viliam; Kohútova, Mária; Letz, Róbert; Segeš, Vladimír; Škvarna, Dušan (2002). Slovak History: Chronology & Lexicon. Bolchazy-Carducci Publishers, Slovenské Pedegogické Nakladatel'stvo. ISBN 0-86516-444-4.
- Engel, Pál (2001). The Realm of St Stephen: A History of Medieval Hungary, 895–1526. I.B. Tauris Publishers. ISBN 1-86064-061-3.
- Kontler, László (1999). Millennium in Central Europe: A History of Hungary. Atlantisz Publishing House. ISBN 963-9165-37-9.
- Kristó, Gyula (1980). Levedi törzsszövetségétől Szent István államáig (From Levedi's Tribal Federation to Saint Stephen's State) (in Hungarian). Magvető. ISBN 963-271-154-8.
- Kristó, Gyula; Makk, Ferenc (1996). Az Árpád-ház uralkodói (Rulers of the House of Árpád) (in Hungarian). I.P.C. Könyvek. ISBN 963-7930-97-3.
- Molnár, Miklós (2001). A Concise History of Hungary. Cambridge University Press. ISBN 978-0-521-66736-4.
- Szegfű, László (1994). "Sámuel". In Kristó, Gyula; Engel, Pál; Makk, Ferenc (eds.). Korai magyar történeti lexikon (9-14. század) (Encyclopedia of Early Hungarian History (9th-14th centuries)) (in Hungarian). Akadémiai Kiadó. pp. 592–593. ISBN 963-05-6722-9.

Samuel Aba House of Aba Born: before 990 or c. 1009 Died: 5 July 1044
Regnal titles
Preceded by Peter	King of Hungary; 1041–1044	Succeeded by Peter
Political offices
Preceded by first known	Palatine of Hungary before 1041	Succeeded by Zache
