= Byzantine–Hungarian War (1149–1155) =

Series of border conflicts

Date	1149–1155
Location	Southern Hungary, Balkans
Result	Status quo ante bellum, peace signed for 5 years, extended for another 5 years in 1161

Belligerents
Byzantine Empire	Kingdom of Hungary; Grand Principality of Serbia (1149–1150, 1154); Banate of Bosnia (1154); Cumans and/or Pechenegs

Commanders and leaders
Manuel I Komnenos; John Kantakouzenos (WIA); John Doukas Komnenos; Theodore Vatatzes; Basil Tzintzilukes; Boris Kalamanos †; Stephanos Kalamanos (?)	Géza II; Beloš; Uroš II (surrendered); Borić; Bágyon (surrendered)

Strength
Byzantine army, including river fleet; Pro-Byzantine Hungarians (1154)	Hungarian army, also involving Pechenegs, Khalyzians; Serbians, Bosnians; "Scythian" (Pecheneg and/or Cuman) light cavalry; Bohemian, Saxon etc. mercenaries

Casualties and losses
	Hungarians: +10,000 POW (1150–1151)

The Byzantine–Hungarian War was a series of border conflicts between the Byzantine Empire and the Kingdom of Hungary that took place in the Balkans from 1149 to 1155. The conflict was affected by international disputes in Europe, primarily between Manuel I Komnenos and Roger II of Sicily, starting in the 1140s. The war broke out when Géza II of Hungary provided military assistance to the Serbs of Rascia (Raška), who rebelled against Byzantine suzerainty. The conflict ended with a peace treaty that restored the status quo ante bellum and established peace for five years. In 1161, the parties agreed to extend the truce for ten years but the relationship between them remained hostile, causing further clashes throughout the 12th century.

== Background ==
=== Status quo ===
After the Byzantine–Hungarian War between 1127 and 1129, relations between the two powers had stagnated but no direct confrontation occurred for twenty years. During the war, the Byzantines retained control of Braničevo (Barancs), Belgrade and Zemun, and recaptured the Sirmium region, which had been Hungarian since the 1060s. Following the end of hostilities with Hungary, John II Komnenos was able to concentrate on Asia Minor for most of his remaining years. In the 1130s, Byzantine interests regarding Hungary were limited to maintaining the status quo from the 1129 treaty and to securing the empire's northernmost frontier along the Danube.

Béla II ascended the Hungarian throne in 1131. His blindness prevented him from administering his kingdom without assistance so he put his trust in his wife Queen Helena and her Serbian relatives, especially her brother Beloš. King Coloman's supposed son Boris Kalamanos attempted to dethrone Béla II. According to Byzantine historian John Kinnamos, Emperor John II Komnenos gave Boris a bride from his own family but the emperor refused to help Boris take the Hungarian throne.

Following Boris' first failure in 1132, Hungary adopted an expansionist policy. Under the influence of his Serbian courtiers, Béla II turned his attention to the Balkans. Bosnia appears to have accepted Béla's suzerainty without resistance by 1137; following this, Béla II and his descendants adopted the title King of Rama. Prior to that, Bosnia had been considered a Byzantine sphere of interest in the Balkans. Simultaneously, the Hungarians seized Split (Spalato) in Dalmatia, which was disadvantageous for the Byzantine Empire. John II Komnenos had to deal with the Norman conquest of southern Italy so he made an alliance with the Holy Roman Empire against the ambitions of Roger II of Sicily. In this context, the relationship between Hungary and the Byzantium remained intact. The remains of Béla's father, former Hungarian pretender Prince Álmos, were returned from the Byzantine Empire to Hungary in 1137, supporting the existence of a permanent connection between the realms.

=== European perspective ===
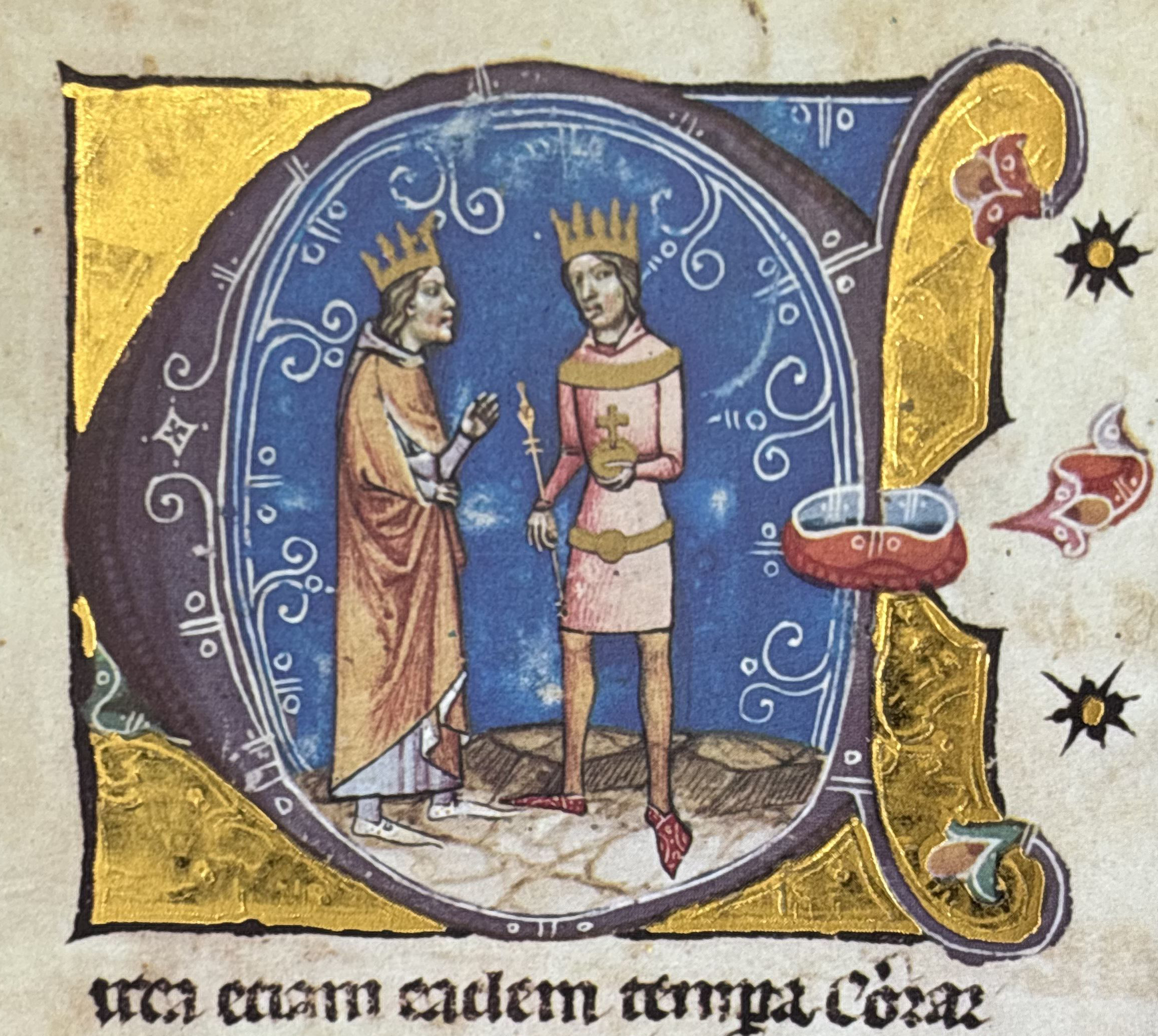
King Géza II of Hungary meets King Louis VII of France during the Second Crusade (Illuminated Chronicle, 1358)

Following the death of Béla II, his eleven-year-old son Géza II ascended to the Hungarian throne in February 1141. During his minority, Géza's mother Helena and her brother Beloš ruled the kingdom. In April 1143, Manuel I Komnenos succeeded his father John II as Byzantine Emperor; Manuel was eager to restore his empire to its former status as the superpower of the Mediterranean, and pursued an energetic and ambitious foreign policy. The pretender Boris successfully approached Conrad III of Germany to seek his assistance against Géza at the end of 1145, which worsened Hungary's relationship with the Holy Roman Empire. The following year, the conflict escalated into the Battle of the Fischa between the Hungarians and the Germans, the Austrians and the Bohemians after Boris' defeat. Disputes among European powers led to the formation of two coalitions in the late 1140s. One alliance was formed by Emperor Manuel and Conrad III against the Normans and their king Roger II of Sicily. Because of their cooperation, Hungary was in a difficult situation and experienced foreign-policy isolation. Géza II sided with Roger II and his allies, including the rebellious German prince Welf VI and Uroš II of Serbia. The pretender Boris attempted to take advantage of Conrad III's decision to lead the Second Crusade to the Holy Land through Hungary. In 1147, German crusaders marched across Hungary without major incident, and King Louis VII of France and his crusaders arrived in Hungary in August of that year. Louis VII rejected Géza's demand to extradite Boris, whom he held in custody and took him out of Hungary. Boris settled in the Byzantine Empire.

Taking advantage of Conrad's crusade, which captured Manuel's attention, the Normans invaded; in 1147, they seized Corfu, and plundered Thebes and Corinth. The following year, Manuel was distracted by a Cuman attack in the Balkans; he enlisted the alliance of Conrad III of Germany and the help of the Venetians, who quickly defeated Roger II of Sicily with their powerful fleet. By 1148, the political situation in the Balkans was divided into the alliance of the Byzantines and Venice, and that between the Normans and Hungarians. The Serbs, Hungarians and Normans exchanged envoys because it was in the interest of the Normans to stop Manuel's plans to recapture Italy. Manuel agreed with Conrad on a joint invasion and partition of southern Italy and Sicily. While Manuel was in Valona (today Vlorë, Albania) planning an offensive across the Adriatic Sea, the Serbs under Uroš II—who was also a maternal uncle of Géza II—revolted, threatening Byzantine Adriatic bases and forcing Manuel to interrupt his preparations for an invasion of Southern Italy and instead invade the Grand Principality of Serbia (also known as Rascia) in 1149. At the same time, the revolt of Welf VI, which was also financed by Roger II and Géza II, and the rise of Henry the Lion, forced Conrad III to stay in the Holy Roman Empire between 1149 and 1151.

The alliance between Manuel and Conrad III was not directed against Hungary but Géza II participated in the Roger-led coalition against the two emperors because German–Hungarian relations had been hostile since 1146 and the Byzantines strongly opposed Géza's foreign policy, including his support of Rascia, his involvement in the internal conflicts of the Kievan Rus' (Note: Géza II sent reinforcements to his brother-in-law, Grand Prince Iziaslav II of Kiev, against Prince Vladimir of Chernigov in early 1148) and his cooperation with Louis VII of France. Iziaslav pursued an anti-Byzantine policy and expelled the metropolite from Kiev to end the ecclesiastical suzerainty of the Patriarch of Constantinople over the Kievan Rus'. Géza's support contributed to the weakening of Byzantine influence in the Rus' principalities. The relationship between Hungary and the Byzantium was also negatively affected by the Byzantine Empire granting asylum to Boris.

== Border clashes ==
=== Serb revolt ===
[Manuel]... did not desire to turn back. He ordered [John] Kantakouzenos...to advance further and engage the barbarians... John [Kantakouzenos]... struck the grand župan [sic!] Bakchinos [Bágyon] on the back... Bakchinos himself and his followers... assailed the emperor at a run...After a long engagement, Bakchinos struck, bringing down his sword on the emperor's jaw, yet was unable to cut the screen [of chain mail] which hung from the helmet over the eyes. The blow, however had enough force that the rings placed next to the flesh were deeply impressed on it... In this struggle Kantakouzenos was deprived of two fingers of one hand. Leading about forty of the enemy captive, the emperor returned to camp.

— John Kinnamos: Deeds of John and Manuel Comnenus

The emperor [Manuel], apprised that the ruler of Serbia was once again working wickedness in the mountains... marched against them with little preparation, as he deemed them unworthy opponents in battle. But the Serbs, emboldened by the support of a large body of Hungarian allied forces, put up a much stiffer resistance than expected. Ever steadfast, John Kantakouzenos engaged the barbarians in close combat, giving and taking blows until he lost the fingers of his hands. The emperor himself fought a duel with the grand zupan [sic!] Bakchinos [Bágyon] a man of heroic stature and brawny arms who struck a blow that shattered the iron screen dependent from the helmet that protected the emperor's face and eyes. The emperor, in turn, severed Bakchinos's arm with his sword, rendering him helpless, and took him captive.

— Niketas Choniates: O City of Byzantium

When the Serbs of Rascia rebelled against the Byzantine Empire in 1149, Manuel sent a retaliation force to crush the rebellion. At the end of September that year, Manuel commanded the imperial army, which entered Rascia from the Adriatic coast across Pelagonia. Uroš II ordered his people to withdraw to the mountains to avoid direct confrontation. The emperor's troops pillaged the region, devastating Serbian towns and abducting inhabitants but Manuel was unable to capture Uroš and his courtiers. Despite that, Manuael returned home and held a victory march in Constantinople at the end of 1149.

There is an argument the Hungarians did not directly take part in the Byzantine–Serbian conflict of 1149; neither John Kinnamos nor Niketas Choniates mentioned them in their accounts of Manuel's invasion. The Volhynian annals refer to Géza's statement in August 1149; " ... I am engaged in war with the emperor [Manuel]". The Hypatian Codex says Géza referred to his war against Manuel when excusing himself for refusing to send reinforcements to Iziaslav II, whom Yuri Dolgorukiy, Prince of Suzdal, expelled from Kiev in August 1149. Historians who say Hungary did not participation in the Serbian revolt argue the monarch referred to his membership in the Norman-led coalition against the Byzantine Empire, which he considered his enemy. According to the triumphal poem of the emperor's panegyrist Theodore Prodromus, Hungarian forces supported the Serbs during the emperor's campaign.

Following his unilaterally declared victory, Manuel again prepared to invade the Kingdom of Sicily in early 1150. Despite the Battle of Flochberg, in which Conrad III defeated the rebellious Welf VI, Conrad did not join Manuel's cause because he felt threatened by a proposed French–Norman crusade to the Holy Land. The Serbs remained hostile to Byzantine interests in the Balkans. Manuel led another campaign against the Serbs in late 1150. Géza II sent a strong force of Hungarians, Pechenegs and Khalyzians (Muslims) to support Uroš II. From Niš, Manuel, alongside John Kantakouzenos and John Doukas Komnenos, marched towards the Sava river, where his army unsuccessfully tried to prevent the Serb army from uniting with the Hungarian auxiliaries led by comes Bágyon (or Bacchinus). After brief skirmishes, the Byzantine army won the Battle of Tara against Serb–Hungarian forces near the Tara river. According to Kinnamos, Manuel dueled with Bágyon after Kantakouzenos lost his fingers during the battle. Following the battle, Uroš II swore loyalty to Manuel and his principality again became a vassal of the Byzantine Empire.

=== Manuel's retaliatory campaign ===
[...] When he [Manuel] reached the Danube's shore, the ships which he had prepared in Byzantion were not at hand...he boarded a skiff, such as the wooden ones which lie by the shores there, and hastened to the farther shore [of the Sava]; he himself held his horse towed by the bridle.

— John Kinnamos: Deeds of John and Manuel Comnenus

..the emperor [Manuel] hastened to attack the Hungarians while still dripping with hot sweat and before he had wiped the dust from his face. He resented the assistance they had given the Serbs, and he decided to take advantage of the absence...the Hungarian king [Geza II]... warring against the neighboring Rhos [Rus']. Crossing the Sava River, he burst in upon Frangochorion [Syrmia] (this is not the least part of Hungary but a sufficiently populated one, situated between the Istros [Danube] and Sava rivers, in which a mighty fortress called Zevgminon [Zemun] had been built) and ravaged the land.

— Niketas Choniates: O City of Byzantium

According to John Kinnamos, the Byzantine army returned to Constantinople after the subjugation of the Serbs and then launched a retaliatory expedition against Hungary. According to Niketas Choniates, Manuel continued his military campaign immediately after his victory in the Battle of Tara. Niketas says at the time of Manuel's invasion, Géza II was warring in the Kievan Rus'. His report is confirmed by the narrative of German chronicler Henry of Mügeln. The chronology is uncertain; most historians believe Manuel advanced into Syrmia (Sirmium) in the final quarter of 1151, while others put the date of attack in 1152. Ferenc Makk, based on a speech by Michael of Anchialus from 1155, said the conflict escalated into a war between the empire and Hungary in late 1150 or early 1151, which accords with all Byzantine, Russian and German chronicles. According to János B. Szabó, Manuel's campaign took place in mid 1152.

The Byzantine army marched against Hungary in late 1150. The Byzantine chronicles list the causes of the war against the kingdom:

- the Hungarians had lent armed assistance to the Serbs in their struggle against the empire;
- Géza also fought against Volodimirko of Galicia, an ally of the Byzantine Empire, in the Rus';
- Kinnamos also emphasized the alliance between Géza and Roger II ("the tyrant of the sea").

The Byzantines crossed the Sava river in quickly carved wooden boats, entered Hungary and laid siege to Zimony (today Zemun, Serbia), which lay opposite the stronghold of Belgrade on the right bank of the Danube river. A part of the army, under the leadership of Theodore Vatatzes, continued to besiege the fort and most of the imperial troops led by Manuel plundered and devastated the surrounding rich province of Syrmia. Local Hungarian units surrendered while the Byzantines pillaged the area, carrying off more than 10,000 people to the south. The defenders of Zimony could not count on a relief army and surrendered, handing over the fortress to Manuel. Advancing imperial troops ransacked the castle and the surrounding town. Following his victory, Manuel started withdrawing his troops, proving the retaliatory nature of his campaign against Hungary; in the 1150s Manuel had no intention of occupying territories, subjugating the kingdom or making it a Byzantine vassal.

News of Géza II's from his war in the Principality of Galicia and that he was marching with the royal army to fight the Byzantines spread. Manuel's army returned to the south bank of the Sava river, where they secured their booty and prepared for battle. Only Géza's uncle and palatine Beloš arrived with a relatively small vanguard. Beloš refrained from engaging Manuel, whose troops subsequently retreated to Braničevo (Barancs) to defend his supply lines. In response to the appearance of Hungarian forces, Manuel ordered the pretender Boris to pillage the region of the Temes River (Temesköz) at the head of a Byzantine army and forced three small Hungarian local county units to flee. Boris withdrew after Géza II appeared at the head of the royal army. Manuel reinforced Byzantine forts along the Danube river in the Balkans and decided to conclude a truce with the Hungarians. According to historians Ferenc Makk and Paul Stephenson, the truce was signed in late 1150 or early 1151. Manuel thereafter returned to Constantinople, where he held a triumphal march to celebrate his victory.

=== Political changes in Hungary ===
...the Romans had constructed as many light boats as possible out of available materials and dragged them to the river, the Hungarians' king [Géza II]... lest being defeated a second time he imperil his realm; he proceeded to negotiations. Sending envoys, he requested that Hungary should not be punitively deprived of more than ten thousand persons, but should regain the remaining throng of captives. Thus he declared he would remain friendly to the Romans throughout his life... After peace had been concluded on these terms, the Romans' army started back from there [bank of the Danube].

— John Kinnamos: Deeds of John and Manuel Comnenus

According to Ferenc Makk, Manuel entrusted Boris to launch an invasion against Hungary because he intended to warn Géza II, as emperor, he could easily realize Boris's claims to the Hungarian throne if he wanted. Based on the title use (kralaina, "queen") of Boris' supposed wife Anna Doukaina, historians Vitalien Laurent and Raimund Kerbl said Manuel and his imperial court recognized Boris as King of Hungary. According to Makk, it could also be a derivative of Boris's self-style title. The retaliatory campaign and Boris's involvement in it had an impact on the domestic-and-foreign political orientations of Géza II. Shortly after the conclusion of the Byzantine–Hungarian truce, Géza's eldest son Stephen was officially designated as his heir until 1152 at the latest, while his younger brothers Ladislaus and Stephen IV were granted dukedoms in Hungary, according to the 14th-century Illuminated Chronicle. Makk said Géza II intended to secure the political unity of the Hungarian elite with these maneuvers.

The 1150–1151 raids by the Byzantine Empire kept the Hungarian king from taking direct military action against the empire for some time. Hungary's defeat weakened their coalition against the Normans. Around 1152, Géza sent his envoy Adalbert to the Kingdom of Sicily to revive relations between the two entities. Géza invaded Galicia in the summer of 1152. The united armies of Géza and Iziaslav defeated Volodimirko's troops at the San River, forcing Volodimirko to sign a peace treaty with Iziaslav. However, the Hungarian king refused to remove Volodimirko from his position, because it would probably have triggered another crisis with the Byzantine Empire. Believing that he had secured the northern frontier of his realm by pacifying the Serbs and the Hungarians, Manuel returned his original plan to invade Sicily. He sent a letter to Conrad III to re-join his cause, but the German monarch died suddenly in February 1152 and the succession of Frederick Barbarossa meant a turning point in the Byzantine–German relations in the longer term.

Géza planned to invade Paristrion – the Byzantine province along the Lower Danube – in the spring of 1153. According to John Kinnamos, Géza sought vengeance for Manuel's invasion of 1150; on the other hand, Michael of Thessalonica wrote that Géza prevented Emperor Manuel from invading Southern Italy. However, the emperor, who had been informed of Géza's plan, marched to the Danube. Géza sent his envoys to the emperor and a new peace treaty was signed in Sardica (now Sofia in Bulgaria). In accordance with the peace treaty, the Byzantines released their Hungarian prisoners of war, according to Abū Hāmid al-Gharnātī, a Muslim traveler from Granada who lived in Hungary between 1150 and 1153. The king was to pay ransom for 10,000 Hungarian prisoners of war, while the rest of the captives were freed without ransom by the "generosity" of Emperor Manuel. Kinnamos writes that the treaty was signed after the death of Roger II of Sicily (February 1154), but the aforementioned Muslim traveler, who stayed in Hungary until 1153, was present when the prisoners of war returned home and interviewed one of them about the situation in the Byzantine Empire, so the confrontation which had almost led to another war and the subsequent conclusion of peace most likely occurred in 1153.

=== Renewal of war ===
...the king of Hungary [Géza II] had assembled forces of Czechs and Saxons and many other nations, and settled down for a siege of Branitshevo [Braničevo]; [...] Hearing of this, the emperor [Manuel] was stunned by the report and wondered at the Hungarians' faithlessness, why for no reason they should disregard what had been lately pledged by them. ... Although the Romans were greatly inferior in number to the enemy, yet they resisted them... In the course of the rout which then ensued, well nigh all the Hungarians with Stephen and many of the Romans fell. Others saved themselves by flight, among whom was the commander Basil.

— John Kinnamos: Deeds of John and Manuel Comnenus

But this emperor [Manuel] once again declared war against the Paiones, who are also called Huns [Hungarians]... an embassy arrived from the Hungarians with peace proposals, and so, altering his course, he marched against the satrap of the Serbs [Uroš II], causing great consternation, and convinced him ...that he should renounce his treaty with the Hungarians.

— Niketas Choniates: O City of Byzantium

Despite the treaty, the relationship between Hungary and Byzantium remained tense and hostile. Manuel was unable to take advantage of the unstable domestic political situation of the new king William I of Sicily. According to John Kinnamos, Manuel was informed the Hungarians organized another attack on the northern frontier of the empire in early 1154. Accordingly, Géza again allied with Uroš II of Serbia upon the advice of Beloš. In response, Manuel began to gather his army in Sardica. Eventually, Géza's envoys hurried to the city and a settlement was reached with Manuel, avoiding another large-scale war with Hungary. Manuel launched a campaign against Serbia and persuaded Uroš to break the alliance with Géza II. Manuel appointed his cousin Andronikos Komnenos as governor of the theme Naissus (Niš) and dux of towns Belgrade, Braničevo and Niš. Manuel's attention returned to Italy, where a race between the Byzantine Empire and the Holy Roman Empire under Frederick Barbarossa for hegemony began. Frederick, like Manuel, regarded himself as the successor of the Roman emperors and his ultimate goal was to rule the entire known world. Simultaneously with Frederick's invasion of Italy, Manuel began to prepare for a Byzantine campaign against the Normans. By that time, Géza sided with Sicily; he sent his Italian-born envoy Gentilis to the court of William.

In late 1154, the Hungarians again distracted Manuel from the Norman plan. Following negotiations with Beloš, Andronikos Komnenos sent a letter to Géza offering to transfer rulership of his governed cities – Belgrade, Braničevo and Niš – and the surrounding area to Géza in exchange for the king's support against Manuel to seize the imperial crown for himself. Andronikos Komnenos' plot was discovered and he was captured, and Géza invaded the Byzantine Empire and laid siege to Braničevo in late 1154. Géza's army was reinforced by Bohemians, Saxons and mercenaries of other nationalities, in addition to the auxiliary troops of Ban Borić, the pro-Hungarian Ban of Bosnia, whose person and state are first mentioned here in contemporaneous historical records. The Hungarian army was also aided by Pechenegs and/or Cumans, who plundered the area along the Lower Danube. The pretender Boris "received a fatal wound and quit this life" in a battle against this light cavalry.

Emperor Manuel stayed in Pelagonia during the siege, and was unable to quickly mobilize his army. Géza II, after hearing of the imprisonment of Andronikos, abandoned the siege and began to return to Hungary. Manuel responded by dispatching troops towards the battlefield. Through Serdica and Niš, Manuel arrived in Svilajnac near Paraćin, where he set up camp. The Hungarians retreated towards Belgrade to cross the Danube river while Borić's troops detached from the main army. The pursuing Byzantine troops under general Basil Tzintzilukes entered into battle with them but Géza annihilated the Byzantine forces before returning home. According to John Kinnamos, a group of Hungarians led by Stephen "son of Géza" sided with the Byzantine army during the battle. They were the first troops to be defeated by the Hungarian army. The identification of this Stephen is uncertain; the chronicler missed the degree of kinship. Some historians identified him with Stephen IV of Hungary, the rebellious brother of Géza II, who may have already defected to the Byzantine Empire. According to Ferenc Makk, this Stephen was the namesake cousin of the future Stephen IV, who supported him in his rebellion against Stephen III in 1164. Makk assumed this Stephen (or Stephanos) was the son of the pretender Boris Kalamanos. Simultaneously with Basil's task, John Kantakouzenos was entrusted to crush the pro-Hungarian rebellion in Belgrade.

In the second quarter of 1155, Manuel and Géza II marched with their armies to meet at the Danube. The Byzantine fleet also arrived on the scene. Géza initiated peace negotiations, and agreed to return the booty and Byzantine prisoners of war he had captured the previous year. Byzantine and Hungarian envoys signed a new peace treaty for five years, which ended the Byzantine–Hungarian wars for the rest of Géza's reign. The political balance of power had changed; William of Sicily was fighting with his rebellious subjects so he could not rely on his support against Byzantium. Economic difficulties arose due to Galician and Byzantine military actions, prompting Géza II to abandon an active foreign policy, including the support of Serbs. The case of southern Italy was a more important foreign-policy goal for Manuel than the situation in the Balkans. The peace treaty between Géza and Manuel restored the status quo ante bellum.

== Aftermath ==
In the same year as the peace treaty, a Byzantine army expelled Géza's ally Desa, from Serbia and restored Uroš II, who had promised he would not enter into an alliance with Hungary. During the last years of his reign, Géza II encountered domestic political challenges. His youngest brother Stephen conspired with their uncle Beloš and other lords against the monarch in 1157. According to Choniates, Stephen was "forced to flee from the murderous clutches" of Géza.

Stephen fled the Holy Roman Empire then left for the Byzantine Empire and settled in Constantinople, where he married Emperor Manuel's niece Maria Komnene. Within two years, he was joined by his brother Ladislaus, who fled Hungary around 1160. Géza II signed a five-year truce with the Byzantine Empire in 1161 and died the following year. Géza II's son Stephen III succeeded him but his exiled uncles Ladislaus II and Stephen IV challenged Stephen III's right to the crown. The civil war was followed by a large-scale Byzantine invasion of Hungary until 1167, when Manuel seized significant territories in Croatia, Dalmatia, Sirmium and Bosnia.

== Sources ==
=== Primary sources ===
- O City of Byzantium, Annals of Niketas Choniatēs (Translated by Harry J. Magoulias) (1984). Wayne State University Press. ISBN 978-0-8143-1764-8.
- Deeds of John and Manuel Comnenus by John Kinnamos (Translated by Charles M. Brand) (1976). Columbia University Press. ISBN 0-231-04080-6.

=== Secondary sources ===
- B. Szabó, János (2013). Háborúban Bizánccal. Magyarország és a Balkán a 11–12. században [War with the Byzantium. Hungary and the Balkans in the 11–12th Century] (in Hungarian). Corvina. ISBN 978-963-13-6150-6.
- Curta, Florin (2006). Southeastern Europe in the Middle Ages, 500–1250. Cambridge University Press. ISBN 978-0-521-89452-4.
- Fine, John Van Antwerp Jr. (1991). The Early Medieval Balkans: A Critical Survey from the Sixth to the Late Twelfth Century. Michigan: The University of Michigan Press. ISBN 0-472-08149-7.
- Makk, Ferenc (1989). The Arpads and the Comneni: Political Relations between Hungary and Byzantium in the 12th Century. Budapest, Hungary: Akadémiai Kiadó. ISBN 978-9-63-055268-4.
- Stephenson, Paul (2000). Byzantium's Balkan Frontier: A Political Study of the Northern Balkans, 900–1204. Cambridge: Cambridge University Press. ISBN 978-0-521-77017-0.
- Treadgold, Warren (1997). A History of the Byzantine State and Society. Stanford University Press. ISBN 0-8047-2630-2.
