= Serbian revolt (1149–1150) =

1150 battle of the Byzantine–Serbian wars

- Part of Byzantine-Serbian Wars and Byzantine–Hungarian War (1149–1155)
Date	1149–1150
Location	Serbia and Byzantine frontier
Result	Byzantine victory

Belligerents
Serbia; Supported by: Hungary	Byzantine Empire

Commanders and leaders
Uroš II; Desa; Grdeša (POW); Vučina (POW); Bakchinos (POW)	Manuel I Komnenos; Constantine Angelos; John Kantakouzenos (WIA); John Komnenos; Michael Branas; Giphardos

Strength
2,000	Larger

The Serbian revolt broke out in 1149 with raids on Byzantine territory, encouraged by Norman Sicily and Hungary. Serbia had entered an alliance with Hungary that could offer Serbian ruler Uroš II support in his fight for independence against the powerful Byzantine Empire. The Serbian revolt had come as a shock, and it exposed Byzantine weaknesses in the control of the Balkans and in diplomacy. Byzantine emperor Manuel I Komnenos diverted his attention from southern Italy to deal with the Serbs, and conquered fortresses in the Raška region in southwestern Serbia, but was unable to capture Uroš II. Although successful, the 1149 campaign did not give the expected results as Serbia endured the destruction. In 1150, the Serbian army located in the Tara River Canyon received a Hungarian supportive unit, while Manuel had mustered an army in Niš. A battle was fought at the Tara river between a Serbian–Hungarian force and the Byzantine army of Manuel, which included prominent generals. Manuel had marched with "little preparation, as he deemed them unworthy opponents in battle", but the Serbs put up a much stiffer resistance than expected and boldly met the Byzantine army in battle. After a string of fights between smaller number of troops, ambushes and duels, the Byzantines were victorious, and Uroš II pledged loyalty.

== Background ==
In the two decades following the Byzantine–Hungarian War (1127–1129), in which Serbs had revolted, Byzantine relations with its Serbian vassals and Hungary were positive. In this period, Serbia and Hungary entered firm relations through dynastic marriage. In 1129–1130, the heir of Stephen II (r. 1116–1131), Hungarian prince Béla II, married Jelena, the daughter of Serbian ruler Uroš I (r. 1112–1145), but this seems to not have bothered Byzantine interests. Uroš's son (Jelena's brother) Beloš also joined the Hungarian court, and both Jelena and Beloš became very influential. This Hungarian–Serbian alliance could offer Uroš support in his fight for independence against the ever more powerful empire that managed to quell any previous uprising. The Komnenian army had shown its effectiveness in the Balkans, and the alliance would be a counter-measure to this. The fight for Serb independence was carried in the Serbian hinterland (also called Raška/Rascia in historiography), as the other Serb polity in the maritime, Zeta (Duklja), was unable to offer support as it had been worn out from rebellion and internal conflict. In 1137, Bosnia became a subject of Hungary, possibly as part of an agreement between Béla II (r. 1131–1141) and Uroš I. In 1141, Géza II, the son of Béla II and Jelena, succeeded the Hungarian throne, and at this time, Beloš was the most powerful in the Hungarian court. In 1143, Manuel I Komnenos succeeded the Byzantine throne, and he inherited a strong and rising empire which had been mostly disengaged in the East to focus on Europe. Serbia was thus pressured, while Manuel sought to preserve the status quo in Hungary. The Serbian throne was succeeded by Uroš's son Uroš II. In 1146, Serbian military assistance was sent by Uroš II for Manuel's expedition against Seljuk sultan Mesud I.

In 1147, relations between European states were affected by the decision for a new Catholic Crusade, where German and French crusader armies would cross Byzantine territory in the Balkans (Belgrade–Braničevo–Niš–Serdica) and further into Asia Minor. Manuel entered an alliance with Conrad III of Germany, while Louis VII of France was allied with Siculo-Norman Roger II of Sicily. Roger II had Corfu taken from the Byzantines and started a war in autumn 1147. By 1148, the political situation in the Balkans was divided into the alliance of Byzantium and Venice, and that between the Siculo-Normans and Hungary. The Serbs, Hungarians and Normans exchanged envoys because it was in Siculo-Norman interest to stop Manuel's plans to recapture Italy. A Serbian revolt would need more fighting power and a wider battlefield, and thus, for the first time in history, Serbia joined a European anti-Byzantine alliance.

The events of the Serbian revolt and Manuel's campaigns are known from Theodore Prodromos (1100–1165), Michael of Thessaloniki (fl. 1149–1156), John Kinnamos (1143–1185), and Niketas Choniates (1155–1217). Kinnamos is the most detailed account, although he tends to exaggerate.

== 1149 campaign ==
In 1149, the Serbians raided Byzantine territory, encouraged by Roger II of Norman Sicily, while Byzantine emperor Manuel I Komnenos was preoccupied with the Siege of Corfu. It is unknown which frontier provinces Uroš II attacked, as contemporaries do not name them. The Serbs posed a danger in case of a Byzantine attack on Italy, as they could strike at the Byzantine Adriatic bases. Another brother of Uroš II and Beloš, Desa, had by 1149 come to rule Travunia, Upper Zeta, and likely Zahumlje. Some historians (such as F. Šišić, Fine Jr., T. Živković) put Desa's takeover of Travunia and Duklja, the latter held by loyal Byzantine vassal Radoslav, in connection with the 1149 revolt (as mentioned in the Chronicle of the Priest of Duklja, LPD). The LPD describes how Radoslav was pushed to his southwestern holdings in Kotor, and retained only that coastal area, while the brothers Desa and Uroš II held much of inland Duklja and Travunia, i.e. over two thirds of what had been Duklja, and that Radoslav sought help from the emperor, who sent aid from Durazzo. T. Živković dated Desa's takeover of Travunia and Zeta to before the end of Uroš I's reign (1144/1145) and believed Uroš II's anti-Byzantine politics began with this, supported also by Beloš in Hungary, and that the provinces that were attacked in 1149 included Duklja, intruded by Desa.

After retaking Corfu in the summer of 1149, emperor Manuel divided his army into two, with one left with megas domestikos John Axouch at Avlona to cross into Italy and use Ancona as a base of operations, while he took the other part to the Balkans, having learnt of an uprising by the Serbs in Raška. According to Choniates, Manuel learnt of the revolt while at Avlona, from where he left for Pelagonia where he planned the campaign. The Serbian revolt had come as a shock, and it exposed Byzantine weaknesses in the control of the Balkans and in diplomacy. Judging by Manuel's swift and strong retaliation, leaving the campaign against Roger II, the Serbian revolt must have been of wider proportion and successful. The Serbs were not aided by any foreign power in 1149, perhaps due to Manuel's quick handling.

Manuel's campaign went in the Pelagonia–Skopje–Kosovo line. From Pelagonia, Manuel marched north, via the Kosovo field to Ras, which he quickly took, archaeological evidence showing that the western ramparts of the Ras fortress were destroyed in the Byzantine assault. There, he left sebastohypertatos Constantine Angelos with a strong garrison, while he continued the campaign. Manuel advanced further into the Nikava province (located either in the Upper Ibar, or in the Pešter–Sjenica area or towards Nova Varoš), part of Uroš II's crown land, and easily conquered the fortresses along the way. He took the well-defended Galič after three days and an assault, and took captives, including soldiers and shepherds, which were settled in Serdica and other parts of the empire. It is believed that the Serbs had rebuilt the Galič fortress by this time. The campaign had the mission to completely cut off the southern provinces of Uroš II and to secure the hinterland for the Byzantine army in continued warfare. While at Galič, Manuel received news that Uroš II clashed with Angelos at Ras. Uroš II attacked individual Byzantine detachments. Manuel set out, while Uroš II declined open pitched battle, using the harsh geography and withdrawing to the hinterland in the west or north-west. The estates of Uroš II were burnt down by Manuel. Manuel I's army was however unable to pursue the Serbs into the mountains, nor to capture Uroš II, and returned home to try again the next year. Michael of Thessaloniki mentioned how Manuel had attacked the centre of the Serbian land. After the defeat in 1149, Uroš II went west of the Lim river and planned for war against the Byzantines. Although successful, the 1149 campaign did not give the expected results as Serbia endured the destruction. According to Choniates, Manuel informed Constantinople of his success via megas domestikos John Axouch; Kinnamos does not mention Axouch as participating in the 1149 campaign, while his activities in other places is well-known.

== 1150 campaign ==
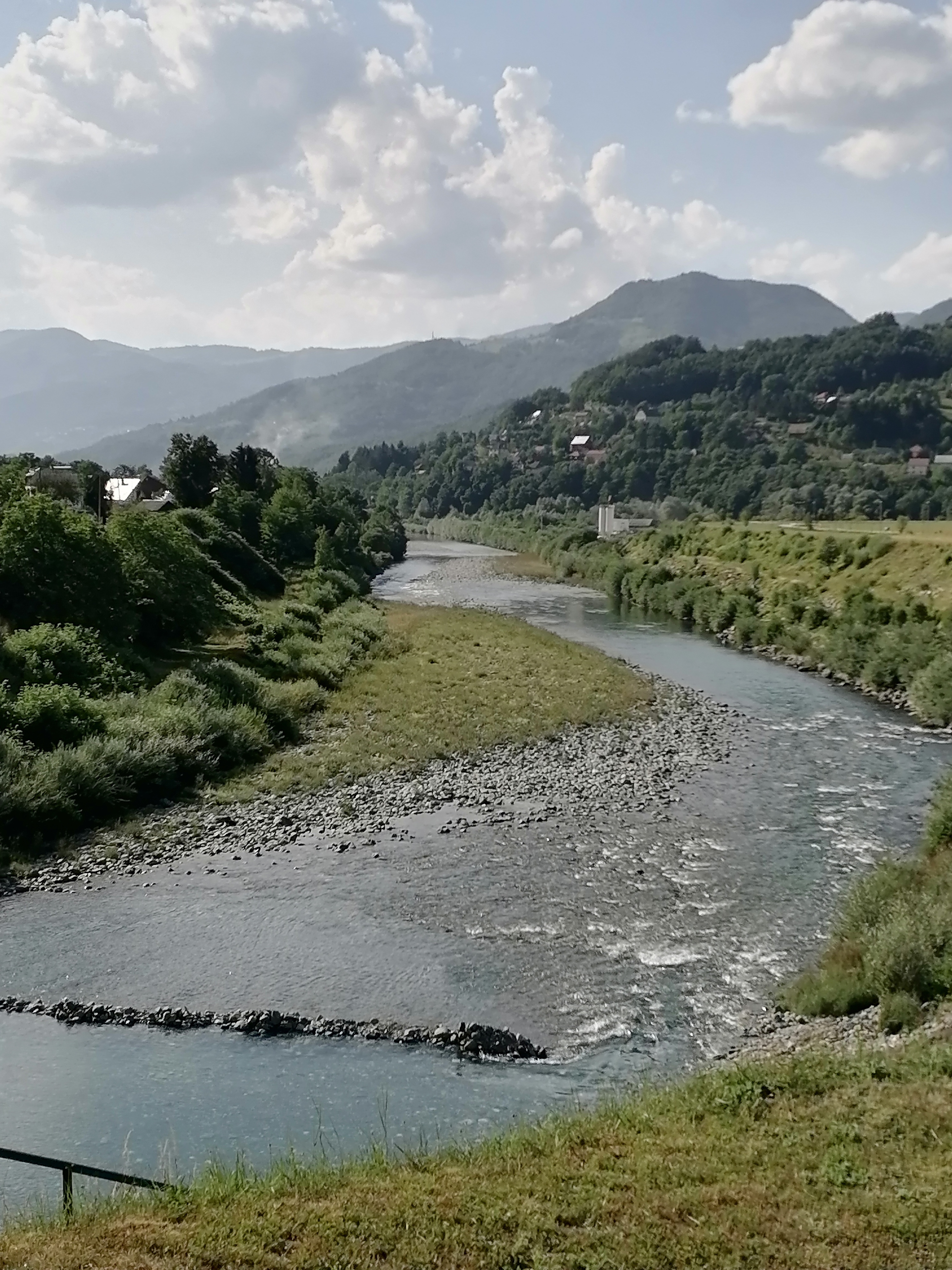
View of the Tara in Mojkovac.

Manuel's campaign was not finished in 1149, as seen in the coming, much larger incursion again personally led by Manuel against Uroš II in 1150. According to Choniates, Uroš II behaved "worse than before", meaning he organized war against Byzantium. Manuel mustered a large army in Niš, which included the most prominent military commanders such as protosebastos John Komnenos, John Doukas Kamateros, John Kantakouzenos, Michael Branas and Giphardos, which commenced at the end of the summer of 1150, "when the roads to Serbia become more suitable for the army". Armed conflict likely began in late September or early October. The Byzantines learnt that the Serbian army awaited military aid from Hungary. Manuel heard of this while at Niš, and decided to send a detachment across the Lugomir župa (opposite Ćuprija) to the Sava river to clash with this force, stopping it from joining the Serbian army. Up until this, Hungary was not a factor for Manuel in this campaign in Serbia. The Hungarian supportive unit most likely descended by the Drina which was the Serbian–Bosnian natural border, and not central Serbia which was militarily in firm Byzantine control; the Byzantine detachment that arrived at the Sava thus changed course to the Drina. The detachment clashed with the Hungarian unit "while procuring food for the cattle", likely while camped by the road which the Hungarian unit travelled on, and Manuel, still at Niš, then sent another detachment under his nephew, protosebastos John Komnenos, when he heard of the clash. This Hungarian unit was defeated by John before it could join the Serbs, and was pursued to the Strymon river where it lost many men, and was then pursued towards the Tara, until the Byzantine force decided to return to Manuel's army. At this time, the Serbian army likely was situated between the Lim and Tara, closer to Tara. Uroš II had made extensive planning, mustering well-armed Serbs and župans (counts).

Manuel camped half-way on the road to Sečenica (Sočanica on the Ibar river), likely somewhere near Kuršumlija, and was still unaware of the location of the Serbian army. From Serbian captives, he learnt that the Hungarian aid had not yet joined the Serbian army, and thus led the Byzantine army onward. The likely route was across the Ibar bridge at the Sočanica confluence, into Rogozna, Ras, Sjenica, towards Bijelo Polje and from there on the Bijelo Polje–Mojkovac road which was the most convenient. Arriving at the Tara river, in the early morning, the Byzantines had sent scouts to attract the Serbs out of the mountain and shoot them with archers, however, the scouts returned in fear, seeing an "innumerable army". The Serbian army was supported by Hungarian cavalry that included non-Christian Khalisioi (who stayed at Syrmia). The Byzantines had failed to prevent the Hungarian supportive unit from joining the Serbian army.

The Byzantine army clashed with the Serbian army most likely in what is today Mojkovac and its environs on both sides of the Tara. Manuel himself took a war flag on a hill and showed himself to the Serbs, after which they left the bridge and were pursued, and then clashed with casualties on both sides. The river bridge held by the Serbs was an important factor, however, that obstacle was early on removed by the Byzantines. From then on, there were mostly a string of fights between smaller number of troops. The outcome of the battle was uncertain, and continued in close combat. The Byzantines pursued Serbian and Hungarian troops and killed many, and managed to capture the "very influential among the Dalmats (Serbs)" Grdeša, the župan (count) of Trebinje, and Vučina. While waiting for his heavy body armour, Manuel saw how many commanders, including Giphardos (known as a good warrior) and Michael Branas, were caught in obvious danger, and were countered by the Serbs. Manuel put on his armour and hurried to the commanders, who were bunched up in the wilderness, and scolded them and called them cowards and untrained, while they complained on the harsh nature and deep snow, then they all joined the main Byzantine troops. The left flank of the Byzantine army was then ambushed by Serbian troops, but Manuel saw that the ambuscade was small, to no threat, and then took his relatives John Kantakouzenos and John Doukas Komnenos to continue looking for Uroš II or the courageous Hungarian commander, to capture. Judging by Kinnamos and Choniates, most fierce fights on the Byzantine side were fought by the bands under Kantakouzenos, Doukas and Manuel himself. Choniates said Manuel had marched with "little preparation, as he deemed them unworthy opponents in battle", but the Serbs put up a much stiffer resistance than expected and boldly met the Byzantine army in battle. Kantakouzenos lost two fingers on one hand while being attacked by Serbian troops. Manuel sought to tactically surprise the Serbian army which was well-informed on Byzantine military methods.

Manuel, Kantakouzenos and Doukas led a pursuit of enemy cavalry, who had noticed Manuel's golden armour, and Kinnamos mentions how Manuel "with a single lance thrust, knocked down 15 foes", and that these were hit in the back with swords and lances. One of the knocked down came back up again and ran towards the emperor, about to strike, but he kicked him down to the ground and cut him by the eye. As Manuel's horse was tired from wearing heavy armour, Kantakouzenos was ordered to assault, and he hurried and engaged commander Bakchinos, who was described by Kinnamos and Choniates as a courageous and gigantic man, hitting him in the shoulders with the lance. At one point, Bakchinos turned around and saw Manuel and John Doukas rushing, then took seven men and entered close combat with Kantakouzenos, who was in danger as more enemy troops closed in. Manuel reckoned he could save Kantakouzenos by attacking the up to 300 enemies in the surroundings, instead of them closing in, and forcing the seven to retreat with the rest. He assaulted the centre of the unit, and entered close combat with one, meanwhile Bakchinos and those around him saw this and left Kantakouzenos and rushed to attack Manuel. Manuel wielded the sword and tirelessly struck and received blows, until he and Bakchinos were left in a duel. Duels were a medieval Western tradition, which spread to Byzantium; in the early Byzantine period, individual close combat were seen as the ordinary soldier's assignment, while from the 10th century Byzantine historiography used it to promote military glory, bravery, strength and weapon handling skills. After a long sword fight, Bakchinos struck Manuel's helmet, according to Kinnamos he was unable to pierce through the chain mail face shield, but it was a blow so hard that the mail rings left marks on Manuel's face, while according to Choniates, he broke Manuel's iron visor. However, Manuel managed to strike and cut off Bakchinos hand, and then gave him over to his nephew John Doukas Komnenos, eager to continue fighting. Kantakouzenos and John Doukas dissuaded him, with Bakchinos somehow warning Manuel of a larger army through showing his hair, in a well-meaning manner. The battle ended in Byzantine victory, and forced Uroš II to negotiate.

The Byzantines led 40 captives to the camp, including Grdeša and Vučina, and the one that was wounded in the eye, and Manuel and he acknowledged each other. Shortly after, Uroš II sent emissaries that asked for his forgiveness, then himself entered the camp after Manuel ordered him to do so. Uroš II was humble and yielding, and Manuel forgave him, with Uroš II "jumping at his feet" and vowed that he "will always be a subject (doulos) to the Romans (Byzantines)". The court orator Theodore Prodromos mentioned the 1149–1150 campaign and called the Serbs "barbarous" and Serbian ruler (archiserbozoupanos) Uroš II a "mountain-reared swine, thrice a slave since birth, driven by senseless audacity, [who] rose against us and our Lord, having Hungarian forces for allies and thus was misled by the Sicilian Dragon". Uroš II promised 2,000 Serbian troops for the Byzantine army in the West and 500 (200 more than previously) for Asian campaigns. In essence, the results were renewal of vassal obligations. From then on, Uroš II enjoyed the support of Manuel.

The 1150 campaign had taken at least or circa two months, according to the descriptions given by Kinnamos. The Serbian-Hungarian force could not have been large, due to the small number of captives, and perhaps amounted to 2,000 troops, out of which 300 were under Bakchinos.

== Aftermath ==
In 1151, Manuel made a punitive expedition against Hungary, explicitly due to their aid to the Serbs, and entered Syrmia and besieged Zemun, with much prisoners and cattle, resulting in a Byzantine–Hungarian peace treaty. In Constantinople, Manuel paraded Hungarian and Serbian prisoners whom he had clothed in luxurious dress to impress the citizens. The Byzantines believed that Hungary would attack in 1152, and while both armies mustered, an attack never came. A new war came close in 1153, when Manuel's army moved northwards and was stopped at Serdica by Géza's deputies who offered immediate peace. After this, Manuel sought to punish Serbia, as it had continued to uphold relations with Hungary; Uroš II was unable to resist and without a struggle once again swore fealty. In the same year (1153), Manuel appointed his relative Andronikos Komnenos the governor of the frontier province towards Hungary and Serbia, including Niš, Braničevo, and perhaps Belgrade. Andronikos began conspiring with Hungary, Frederick Barbarossa, and Manuel's rivals, to take the Byzantine throne for himself. It is unknown whether he contacted Uroš II, though, in any case, Serbia was informed on this through the Hungarian court. Hungary planned for an offensive and gathered allied armies and mercenaries, as Andronikos' bid was a prospect of victory. The Byzantines learnt of the conspiracy and imprisoned Andronikos. Manuel's rival Roger II died in February 1154. In 1154, Hungary attacked Braničevo and clashed with the Byzantine army outside Belgrade, and the two signed peace in 1155.

In 1155, the rivals of Uroš II ousted him and put his brother Desa, the ruler of Pomorje, on the throne. The cause of his ousting was the continued Byzantine vassalage, and Desa is deemed to have been a Hungarian ally. The Serbian župani (counts) feared that Manuel would react, and knew that Uroš II had the support of Manuel, and thus asked him to arbitrate. Manuel hosted the Serbian župani and Uroš II and Desa at Niš, and gave his support to, or chose Uroš II to rule Serbia, and used the occasion to affirm Byzantine power in the Balkans and impress German, French and Turkic emissaries present. Desa came to govern the province of Dendra towards Niš. The next Byzantine–Serbian conflicts came in the 1160s.

== Annotations ==
1. The events are known in historiography as the "Serbian revolt", "uprising of the Serbs of Raška", "rebellion against Byzantium", "Manuel’s campaign against the Serbs", "Serbian uprising of 1149" (српски устанак 1149. године), "first campaign of emperor Manuel against the Serbs" (први поход цара Манојла против срба), "battle of Tara" (Битка на Тари), "Battle of the river Tara", etc.
2. Strymon (Greek: Στρυμων) was identified by M. Blagojević (1976) as the Grabovi brod river crossing in Vidovo, which lay "in Zastruma" according to the 1360 Hilandar charter issued by Stefan Uroš V, that is, the part of Velika Morava some 6–7 km south of Paraćin. Kalić (1982) supported this theory. R. Novaković (1979), who studied the 1150 campaign in detail, believed it was simply a synonym for "river", as in Slavic strumen, and that it possibly was Tamnava, and should not be identified anywhere in central Serbia as the Hungarian force went beside the Drina to join up with the Serbian army.
3. Sečenica (Greek: Σετζενιτζα) has been identified with Sočanica village on the right bank of the Ibar river, north of Zvečan; the Sitnica river on the Kosovo field; or Sjenica, which lay on the medieval road from the Ibar valley to Polimlje and the Adriatic. M. Blagojević (1976) instead identified it with Sečanica, a village dating to the 15th century some 10 km northwest of Niš, on the left bank of the South Morava below the Jastrebac mountain, due to the toponymic likeness and the belief that Manuel would have camped near Niš. R. Novaković (1979), who studied the 1150 campaign in detail, refuted Blagojević and identified it with Sočanica on the Ibar river, as Manuel must have marched westwards with the logical course of events. The encampment was thus likely somewhere near Kuršumlija.
4. Bakchinos (Serbian: Вакхин/Vakhin) was a commander (called archizoupanos) that fought in the Serbian–Hungarian force against the Byzantine army at Tara in 1150. He was mentioned by John Kinnamos and Niketas Choniates. There were several theories on his identity in the 19th century: a Serbian veliki župan, the same as Uroš II (K. Nikolajević, Golubinsky) or Čedomilj (Siniša, P. J. Šafarik), or a ruler named Vukan (Kukuljević Sakcinski); a Serbian ordinary župan (Grot, Freidenberg, Dölger). Vasilevsky and I. Ruvarac refuted these theories as Kinnamos never calls him the archizoupanos of Serbs, nor does Choniates, and this Bakchinos was defeated in a duel and taken prisoner, while Uroš II was never taken prisoner and arrived at the Byzantine camp after the end of the battle. Theodore Prodromos mentioned that the "commander of the king" (tou krali ton stratarches) was defeated at the end of the battle, and this could only mean a commander sent by Hungarian king Geza II to aid the Serbs. Modern historiography supports that he was a Hungarian commander (Jireček-Radonić, Ćorović, Moravcsik, Zlatarski, J. Kalić, etc.). Interestingly, he was described as a very large man, while Otto Frisingensis described the Hungarians in 1147 as "short statured" (Latin: statura humiles).
5. Prodromos claimed that Serbia in the wider sense was involved in the battle, with "Dokleans, Dacians and Dalmats", and several zoupanoi.

== Sources ==
- Blagojević, Miloš (1976). "„Сеченица (Σετζενιτζα), Стримон (Στρυμων) и Тара (Ταρα) у делу Јована Кинама". Зборник радова Византолошког института. 17. Византолошки институт: 65–75 – via Google Books.
- Ferjančić, Božidar (1971). "Михаило Солунски". Византијски извори за историју народа Југославије, том IV. IV. Византолошки институт: 185–193.
- Fine, John Van Antwerp Jr. (1991) [1983]. The Early Medieval Balkans: A Critical Survey from the Sixth to the Late Twelfth Century. Ann Arbor, Michigan: University of Michigan Press.
- Janjić, Dragana (2018). "ГАЛИЧ–СРЕДЊОВЕКОВНО УТВРЂЕЊЕ". Vojnoistorijski glasnik. 2: 9–24.
- Kalić, Jovanka (1971a). "Јован Кинам" [Ioannis Kinnamos]. Византијски извори за историју народа Југославије, том IV. IV. Византолошки институт: 1–106.
- Kalić, Jovanka (1971b). "Никита Хонијат" [Niketas Choniates]. Византијски извори за историју народа Југославије, том IV. IV. Византолошки институт: 107–172.
- Kalić, Jovanka (1982). "Српски велики жупани у борби с Византијом". Историја српског народа. Vol. 1. pp. 197–211.
- Kalić, Jovanka (2016). "Grand Župan Uroš II of Rascia". Balcanica. XLVII: 75–96.
- Magdalino, Paul (2002). The Empire of Manuel I Komnenos, 1143-1180 (illustrated, reprint ed.). Cambridge University Press. ISBN 0521526531.
- Novaković, Relja (1979). "Још нешто поводом битке на Тари 1150. године". Историјски часопис. 25–26: 5– – via Google Books.
- Stephenson, Paul (2004) [2000]. Byzantium's Balkan Frontier: A Political Study of the Northern Balkans, 900–1204. Cambridge University Press. pp. 224-. ISBN 978-0-521-77017-0.
- Škrivanić, Gavro (1962). "Bitka na Tari" [Battle on the Tara]. Vesnik Vojnog Muzeja JNA. 6–7: 27–35.
- Živković, Tibor (2006). Портрети српских владара: IX-XII век [Portraits of Serbian Rulers: IX-XII century]. Завод за уџбенике и наставна средства, Београд. ISBN 9788617137548.
- Živković, Vojislav (2025). "Двобоји у средњовековној Србији" [Duels in Medieval Serbia]. Балканске синтезе. XII (1). Универзитет у Нишу - Филозофски факултет: 49–60. doi:10.46630/bs.1.2025.03. ISSN 2406-1190.
