= Barancs =

Barancs may refer to:

- Zemplínsky Branč, a village in Slovakia
- Braničevo, a toponym in Serbia
