= Beloš =

- Comes palatinus of Hungary

Grand Prince of Serbia
- Reign: 1162
- Predecessor: Uroš II
- Successor: Desa

Ban of Croatia
- Reign: 1146–1157
- Predecessor: Aleksije
- Successor: Arpa

Regent of Hungary
- Reign: 1141–1146
- Predecessor: Béla II
- Successor: Géza II
- Born: after 1083
- Died: before 1198; Hungary
- Issue: daughter
- Dynasty: Vukanović
- Father: Uroš I
- Mother: Anna Diogenissa

Beloš (Serbian Cyrillic: Белош; Hungarian: Belos or Belus; Greek: Βελούσης fl. 1141–1163), was a Serbian prince and Hungarian palatine who served as the regent of Hungary from 1141 until 1146, alongside his sister Helena, mother of the infant King Géza II. Beloš held the title of duke (dux), and ban of Croatia from 1146 until 1157 and briefly in 1163. Beloš, as a member of the Serbian Vukanović dynasty, also briefly ruled his patrimony as the Grand Prince of Serbia in 1162. He lived during a period of Serbian-Hungarian alliance, amid a growing threat from the Byzantines, who had earlier been the overlords of Serbia.

== Origin ==
Beloš was the third son of Uroš I, the Grand Prince of Serbia (r. ca 1112–1145), and Anna Diogenissa, the granddaughter of Romanos IV Diogenes, the Byzantine Emperor (r. 1068–1071). According to historian György Szabados, it is possible that Beloš was born around 1108. Serbian historian Jovanka Kalić put the date of his birth in the period from 1110 to 1115. He had two brothers, Uroš II Primislav and Desa, and two sisters, Helena (the mother of King Géza II of Hungary) and Maria. Zavida, the father of future Grand Prince Stefan Nemanja, is possibly a fourth brother, this is however undisclosed.

== Career in Hungary ==
=== Regent ===
Beluš [...] departed to Hungary. After he spent a long time there, he became particularly esteemed by king Géza, since he had participated in his nurture and education from childhood. Owing favors for this, he undertook to make Serbia a subject-ally to Géza; having discussed this on every possible occasion, he was able to persuade the man by persistent requests.

— John Kinnamos: Deeds of John and Manuel Comnenus

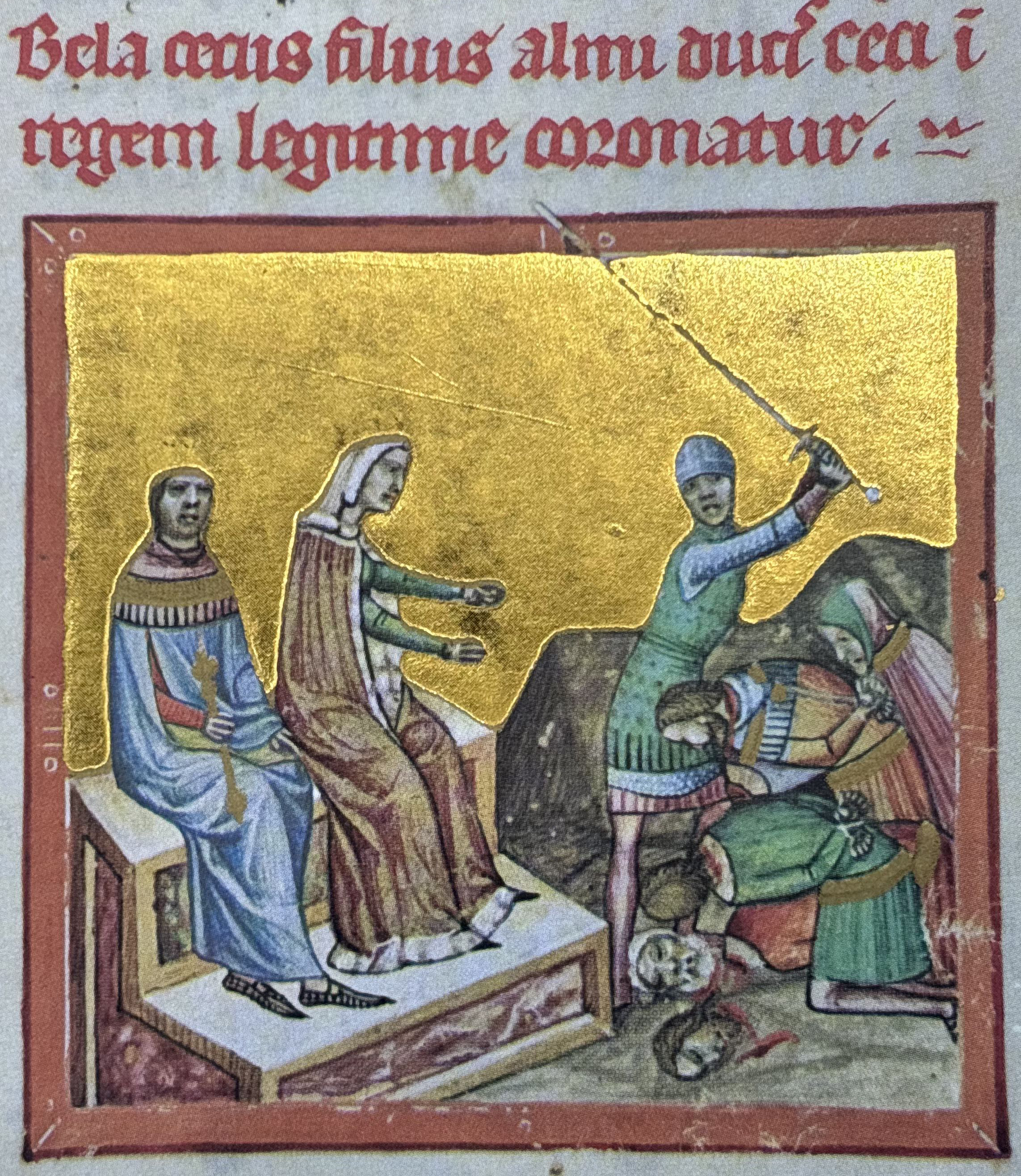
Helen

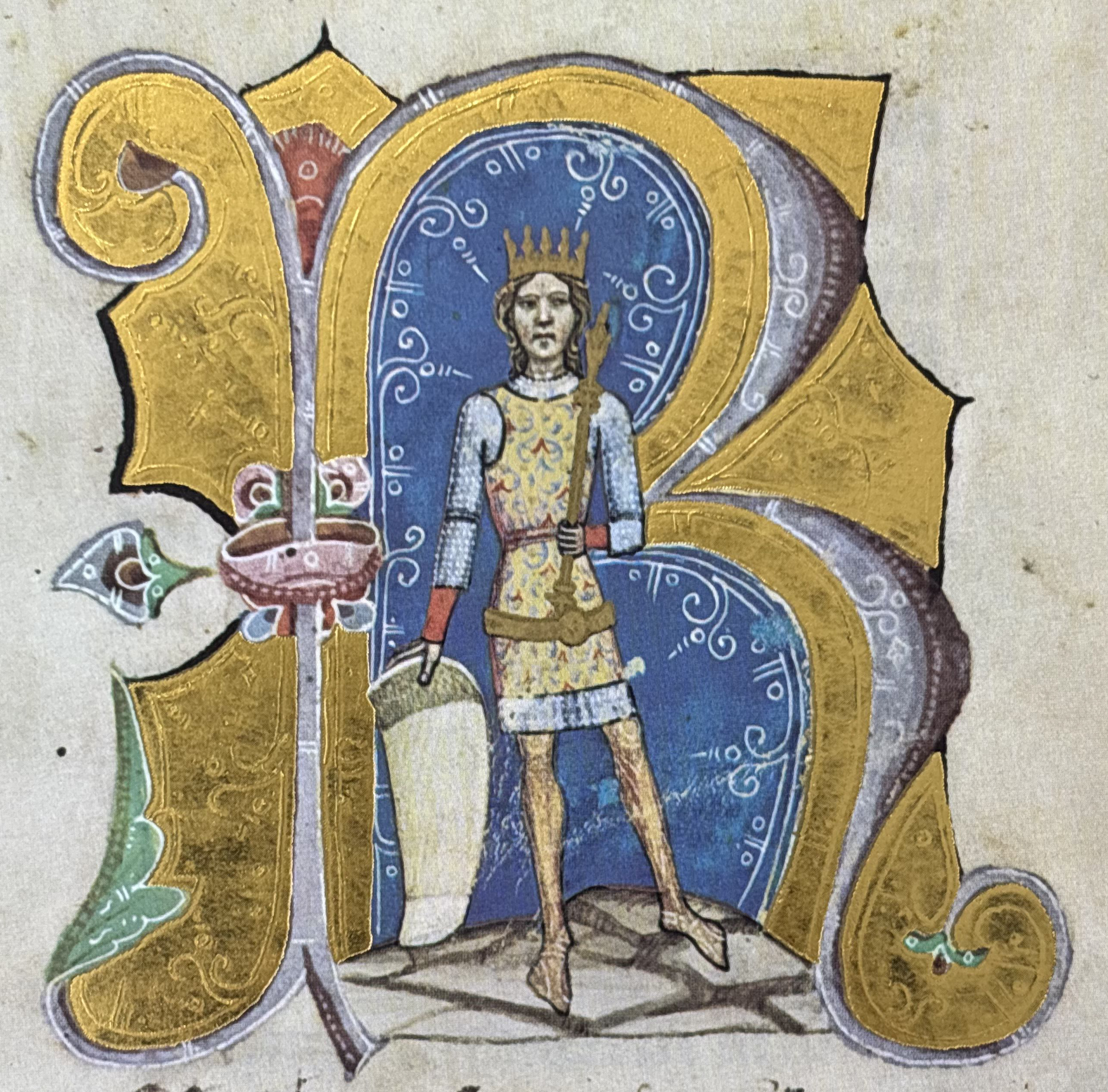
Géza II

His sister Helen, married the Hungarian heir apparent, Béla in 1129. Beloš escorted her to Hungary in order to strengthen the Hungarian–Serbian alliance against the Byzantine Empire. In 1131, Béla II, who was blinded during his young age, was crowned the King of Hungary, succeeding the child-less Stephen II following a brief internal war. Beloš joined his sister at the Hungarian royal court, and received the title of dux. There is no record of Beloš's activity in the subsequent decade, the Hungarian chronicles emphasize Helen's influence and role in the government during the reign of her husband. Nevertheless, Beloš assisted his brother-in-law in the governance of the kingdom as a member of the royal council. According to the Byzantine historian John Kinnamos, Beloš took part in the tutoring of his nephew, prince Géza, who was born in 1130, since his childhood. It is possible that Beloš interceded Béla II in 1136 to recapture some of the Dalmatian coast the Hungarians had lost to the Republic of Venice, in addition to the submission of Bosnia.

Béla II died on 13 February 1141, and the eldest son and heir Géza II was still a child, thus Helen and Beloš became co-regents in his place. The brother and sister governed the Kingdom of Hungary until Géza II's coming of age, in September 1146. Beloš bore the title of dux in the period between 1142 and 1146, as first as external member of the ruling Árpád dynasty. As regent, Beloš concluded an alliance between the Kingdom of Hungary and the Principality of Halych. He played a role in the young Géza's decision to send auxiliary troops in order to support Prince Volodymyrko Volodarovych in his war against Grand Prince Vsevolod II of Kiev in the autumn of 1144. The Hungarian army was led by Beloš, but no serious clash took place involving the Hungarians. Subsequently, Beloš remained a central figure in fostering the Hungarian–Galician alliance. The Austrian and Bavarian mercenaries of the pretender Boris Kalamanos stormed into Hungary and captured Pressburg (present-day Bratislava in Slovakia) in April 1146. Géza II and Beloš successfully managed to defend Hungary.

=== Palatine and Ban ===
As the king [Géza], however, was not at hand, but Beluš who bore the highest rank among them (the Hungarians call this office "Ban") was reported to be not far off, he [Manuel] quickly hastened toward him. [...] On the morrow Beluš learned of the emperor's approach and departed with his whole force, after he had concocted some feeble excuses. Contriving a pretext for flight, he [Beluš] declared that he had been directed by the king to turn aside from the prescribed route and go to the city of Branitshevo, so that he might be better able to attack the Romans [Byzantines] from there.

— John Kinnamos: Deeds of John and Manuel Comnenus

Even after his nephew Géza was declared of age in the second half of 1146, Beloš remained the most powerful lord in Hungary until 1157. In 1146, he received the title of comes palatinus (Count Palatine), the highest court title of the Kingdom of Hungary. According to a non-authentic charter, he held the dignity already in 1145. Simultaneously with the position of palatine, he also functioned as Ban of Croatia since the year 1146. He held both offices until his fall from grace in 1157. His both positions usually appear altogether in the contemporary royal charters in Hungary, marking that Beloš exercised an unprecedented power in the kingdom. Despite the position of palatine was considered the most powerful dignity in the kingdom, Beloš was more frequently styled as ban in contemporary – including the last testament of priest Crnota – and later documents. The first known member of the powerful Šubić family, a certain Bogdanac belonged to the entourage of Ban Beloš.

He arranged the marriage between Géza II and Euphrosyne of Kyiv, the sister of the incumbent Grand Prince Iziaslav II of Kiev, which marked Géza's coming to age. In retaliation for their support in favor of the pretender Boris, Géza invaded Austria in the autumn of 1146. Beloš also participated in the Battle of the Fischa in September 1146, where Henry Jasomirgott, Margrave of Austria was routed. According to the chronicler Otto of Freising, Beloš led the second combat line right behinds the Székelys and Pechenegs. His troops broke through the enemy's defenses, after which the king could launch an attack with his chosen warriors. The 14th-century Illuminated Chronicle refers to Beloš as a "renowned warrior among thousands". According to the chronicle, he "charged with his men from the rear into the German ranks, fell on them heavily and inflicted on them great slaughter".

Beloš married his unidentified daughter to the Russian prince Vladimir III Mstislavich – younger brother of Queen Euphrosyne – in 1150. The queen played a role in the arrangement of this union, according to the near-contemporary Kievan Chronicle. The marriage was a confirmation of the Hungarian–Serbian–Galician political alliance against the Byzantine Empire. Hungary supported the Serbs in their struggle for independence. Emperor Manuel I Komnenos launched a military campaign against Serbia in 1150. The Byzantine army routed the united troops of Hungarians and Serbs on the river Tara in September 1150, which resulted that Uroš II of Serbia – the brother of Beloš – acknowledged the emperor's suzerainty. Manuel launched a retaliatory campaign against Hungary and ravaged the lands between the rivers Sava and Danube, and also laid siege to Zimony (present-day Zemun, Serbia) in late 1150. Since Géza II fought in Halych, only Beloš arrived with the Hungarian army, but he refrained from engaging Manuel, whose troops subsequently retreated to Braničevo. Assisted by Byzantine troops, the pretender Boris also broke into Hungary and devastated the valley of the river Temes. Géza, who had just returned from Halych, sued for peace and the treaty was signed in early 1151.

Beloš was delegated into a special ad-litem court in order to judge over a lawsuit regarding the servants of the Diocese of Veszprém in 1152, along with judge royal Héder and other ispáns. Beloš negotiated with Emperor Manuel's cousin, Andronikos Komnenos, governor of Belgrade, Braničevo and Niš, who sent a letter to Géza around 1153, offering to hand over those towns to Géza in exchange for Hungarian support against the emperor. However, Andronikos' plot was discovered and he was captured. In 1154, Beloš assisted Ban Borić of Bosnia to conquer Braničevo from the Byzantines. In contemporary records, Beloš last appears as Palatine of Hungary in March 1157; he was among the testimonies when Wolfer established Küszén Abbey with the permission of the king.

== Grand Prince of Serbia ==
Then, making no account of agreement or oaths, he [Uroš II] again engaged in rebellion. The emperor [Manuel], who thereby fully comprehended the man, removed him from office and established his brother Beluš in it. [...] While Beluš was for a short while resplendent in office, he laid aside the monarchical state, abandoned his fatherland, and went to Hungary. After he had lived there for a long time he departed from mankind.

— John Kinnamos: Deeds of John and Manuel Comnenus

In the 1150s, Beloš gradually lost his political influence in the royal court. The economic difficulties which arose due to Galician and Byzantine military actions, prompted Géza II to abandon active foreign policy, including the support of Serbs. In early 1155, the Byzantine and Hungarian envoys signed a new peace treaty. Beloš, now politically isolated, was dissatisfied with the change of political direction. Géza's youngest brother, Stephen, started conspiring with their uncle, Beloš, and other lords against Géza, according to the nearly contemporaneous Rahewin. They planned Géza's assassination. The German chronicler writes that the prince was instigated by Duke Beloš, a "very shrewd and scheming man, who seemed to be feeding the pride of a young man already accustomed to too much honor". To avoid a civil war, Géza first ordered the persecution of Stephen's partisans, then had his rebellious brother expelled from the kingdom and even sentenced to death. Beloš fled Hungary shortly after the spring of 1157. Although there are considerations that place the year of his departure at 1158, a certain Apa was styled as ban already in 1157.

Beloš returned to Serbia. The Byzantine historian John Kinnamos mentions that Emperor Manuel ousted Uroš II (or Primislav) from his position around 1161 or 1162, replacing him with Beloš, who was installed as Grand Prince of Serbia in 1162. There is also arguments that he already ruled Serbia since 1157 or 1158, but the chronological order of Kinnamos' work does not confirm this assumption. Beloš ruled the principality for a short time, because he was unable to stabilize his rule due to lack of domestic support. He resigned in favor of his younger brother Desa still in 1162. Only John Kinnamos mentions Beloš's brief reign in Serbia.

Meanwhile in Hungary, Géza II died in May 1162. His 15-year-old son Stephen III succeeded him, but his pro-Byzantine uncles – Ladislaus and the aforementioned Stephen – contested his legitimacy, causing a civil war in the kingdom. Shortly after his resignation from the principality, Beloš returned to Hungary as a confidant of Stephen IV, who, as anti-king, ascended the Hungarian throne after Ladislaus' death in January 1163. Beloš is styled as Ban of Croatia and Dalmatia in Stephen's only preserving royal charter from that year. His name appears in the first place, demonstrating the fact that he was the most illustrious member of the usurper's royal court. The document confirms ban Beloš's decision that the Dubrava forest belongs to the Bishopric of Zagreb. Stephen IV was defeated by his namesake nephew in a decisive battle near Székesfehérvár in June 1163. Beloš, thereafter, disappears from contemporary records, his fate is uncertain. It is possible that he perished in the skirmish. John Kinnamos writes that Beloš lived the remaining part of his life in Hungary. He is referred to as a deceased person by a letter of Pope Innocent III in 1198.

== Personal life ==
He founded a Benedictine monastery in present-day Banoštor (then known as Kewe), which made the locals call the town Banov manastir (Ban's Monastery, Hungarian: Ban monostra), hence the modern name Banoštor (Hungarian: Bánmonostor), in the territory of the Archdiocese of Kalocsa (present-day Serbia). The monastery was dedicated to Saint Stephen the Protomartyr and Beloš provided sufficient income to support thirty monks. Despite that no ecclesiastical orders were able to remain for a long time within its walls. Andrew, Archbishop of Kalocsa confiscated the then abandoned abbey from the Benedictines and handed it over to the monks of Abraham of the Valley of Hebron in the 1180s. They also left the monastery by 1198, when Pope Innocent dealt with the issue. When Ugrin Csák, Archbishop of Kalocsa initiated the establishment of the Diocese of Syrmia in 1229, he selected the abandoned monastery as the episcopal seat of the newly founded bishopric.

His daughter, called Banovna in Russian, married Rus prince Vladimir Mstislavich in 1150, the future Prince of Volhynia.

== Notes ==
1. Name: His given name was Beloš (Белош), also rendered as Beluš or Bjeloš, while in Latin as Albeus. He was the son of Uroš, and a descendant of the Vukanović, hence, his name according to the name system was Beloš Urošević Vukanović.

== Sources ==
=== Primary sources ===
- Deeds of John and Manuel Comnenus by John Kinnamos (Translated by Charles M. Brand) (1976). Columbia University Press. ISBN 0-231-04080-6.
- The Deeds of Frederick Barbarossa by Otto of Freising and his Continuator, Rahewin (Translated and annotated with an introduction by Charles Christopher Mierow with the collaboration of Richard Emery) (2004). Columbia University Press. ISBN 0-231-13419-3.
- Bak, János M.; Veszprémy, László; Kersken, Norbert (2018). Chronica de gestis Hungarorum e codice picto saec. XIV [The Illuminated Chronicle: Chronicle of the deeds of the Hungarians from the fourteenth-century illuminated codex]. Budapest: Central European University Press. ISBN 978-9-6338-6264-3.

=== Secondary sources ===
- F. Romhányi, Beatrix (2000). Kolostorok és társaskáptalanok a középkori Magyarországon: Katalógus [Monasteries and Collegiate Chapters in Medieval Hungary: A Catalogue] (in Hungarian). Pytheas. ISBN 963-7483-07-1.
- Font, Márta (2021). The Kings of the House of Árpád and the Rurikid Princes. Cooperation and conflict in medieval Hungary and Kievan Rus'. Arpadiana VIII., Research Centre for the Humanities. ISBN 978-963-416-278-0.
- Gál, Judit (2020). Dalmatia and the Exercise of Royal Authority in the Árpád-Era Kingdom of Hungary. Arpadiana III., Research Centre for the Humanities. ISBN 978-963-416-227-8.
- Kalić, Jovanka (1997). "Белош" [Le joupan Belos]. Zbornik radova Vizantološkog instituta. 36. SANU: 63–81.
- Kalić, Jovanka (2016). "Grand Župan Uroš II of Rascia". Balcanica. 47: 75–96.
- V. Klaić, Hrvatski bani za Arpadovića (1102–1301), u Vjesniku kraljevskog zemaljskog arhiva, l (1899), 129–138;
- Makk, Ferenc (1989). The Árpáds and the Comneni: Political Relations between Hungary and Byzantium in the 12th century (Translated by György Novák). Akadémiai Kiadó. ISBN 963-05-5268-X.
- Markó, László (2006). A magyar állam főméltóságai Szent Istvántól napjainkig: Életrajzi Lexikon [Great Officers of State in Hungary from King Saint Stephen to Our Days: A Biographical Encyclopedia] (in Hungarian). Helikon Kiadó. ISBN 963-547-085-1.
- Szabados, György (2003). "Belos bán [Ban Beloš]". In Szentpéteri, József (ed.). Szürke eminenciások a magyar történelemben (in Hungarian). Kossuth Kiadó. pp. 8–9. ISBN 963-09-4499-5.
- Szőcs, Tibor (2014). A nádori intézmény korai története, 1000–1342 [An Early History of the Palatinal Institution: 1000–1342] (in Hungarian). Magyar Tudományos Akadémia Támogatott Kutatások Irodája. ISBN 978-963-508-697-9.
- Thoroczkay, Gábor, ed. (2018). Írott források az 1116–1205 közötti magyar történelemről [Written Sources of the Hungarian History between 1116 and 1205] (in Hungarian). Szegedi Középkorász Műhely. ISBN 978-615-80398-3-3.
- Dr. M. Wertner, Ungarns Palatine und Bane im Zeit-alter der Arpaden (Ungarische Revue, 14, 1894, 129–177).
- Zsoldos, Attila (2011). Magyarország világi archontológiája, 1000–1301 [Secular Archontology of Hungary, 1000–1301] (in Hungarian). História, MTA Történettudományi Intézete. ISBN 978-963-9627-38-3.

Beloš Vukanović dynasty
Regnal titles
Preceded by Uroš II	Grand Prince of Serbia; 1162	Succeeded by Desa
Political offices
Preceded by Fonsol	Palatine of Hungary; 1146–1157	Succeeded by Héder
Preceded by Alexius	Ban of Slavonia; 1146–1157	Succeeded by Apa
Preceded by Apa	Ban of Slavonia; 1163	Succeeded by Ampud
