= Sočanica Basilica =

Basilica in Sočanica, Kosovo

Sočanica (Serbian: Sočanica; Albanian: Soqanicë) is a basilica of a 9-10th-century church in the village Sočanica, in Leposavić, Kosovo. The stone decoration dates it to the reigns of Simeon I of Bulgaria (893-927) and Petar of Serbia. It was in use in the 11th and 12th centuries according to grave finds. In the reign of Grand Prince Uroš II, the site was known as Sečenica and was defended from the Byzantines from the newly built fortress at Galič, protecting the bridge over Ibar and the road to Ras.

The site draws continuity with Municipium Dardanorum.
