= Grdeša =

12th century Slavic chieftain with a title župan

Grd / Grdeša
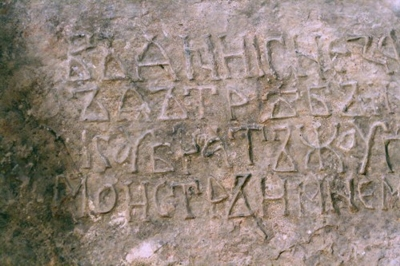
- The tombstone of Grd
- Born: ca. 1120
- Died: 1178 or ca. 1180
- Occupations: Nobility, military leader
- Title: župan
- Military career
- Allegiance: Serbian Grand Principality
- Service years: fl. 1150–51
- Conflicts: Serbian revolt (1149–1150)

Grdeša (Serbian Cyrillic: Грдеша, Latin: Gerdessa, Gurdeses; fl. 1150–51) or Grd was a local Slavic chieftain from the region surrounding Trebinje, who ruled the area with a title of župan. He was mentioned in 1150–51 as one of the military commanders in the army of Grand Prince Uroš II of Serbia.

It is believed that Grdeša was born around 1120. In 1150 he was one of the military commanders in the army of Uroš II of Serbia that fought the Byzantine Empire; the combined Serbo-Hungarian army suffered defeat at the Battle of Tara, where Grdeša and fellow Duke Vučina (Bучинa) where captured. It is assumed the prisoners were taken to Sredets, but were released in 1151. The death of Grd is placed in 1178 or around 1180. He had a son, župan Pribilša, who "died in the time of Stephen Vladislav I of Serbia".

His tomb (stećak) was found at the local community of Police in Trebinje. The tablet mentions him "in the days of Grand Prince Mihailo" as the župan of Trebinje, and also his brother župan Radomir (Радомир), and his family. The stećak is the oldest found and is currently held at the Museum of Herzegovina in Trebinje. A spur of his is in the collection of the National Museum in Sarajevo.

A charter, believed to be written in 1151, was found, and in it Desa, the younger brother of Uroš II, gifted the island of Mljet to the monastery of Saint Mary in Apulia, of which witnesses were "iupanus Gerdessa, Desimir, setnicus Rastessa, iupanos Grubessa, Petrus comes Raguseorum...".

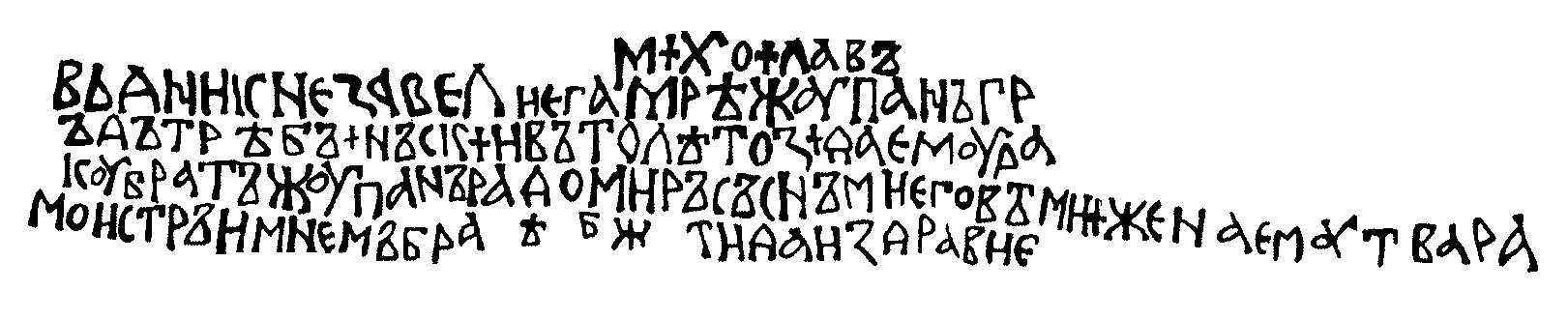
Stećak of Grdeša, the oldest one found.

== Sources ==
- Brand, Charles M. (1976). Deeds of John and Manuel Comnenus. Columbia University Press. ISBN 978-0-231-52155-0.
- Mihaljčić, Rade; Steindorff, Ludwig (1982). Namentragende Steininschriften in Jugoslawien vom Ende des 7. bis zur Mitte des 13. Jahrhunderts. Steiner Franz Verlag. ISBN 978-3-515-03873-7.
- Jireček, Konstantin; Jagić, Vatroslav (1912). Staat und Gesellschaft im mittelalterlichen Serbien: Studien zur Kulturgeschichte des 13.-15. Jahrhunderts. Zentralantiquariat der Deutschen Demokratischen Republik.
- Kalić-Mijušković, Jovanka; Ferjančić, Božidar; Radošević, Ninoslava; Ostrogorski, Georgije; Barišić, Franjo (1971). Vizantijski izvori za istoriju naroda Jugoslavije. Vizantološki institut SANU.
