= Braničevo =

Braničevo may refer to:

- Braničevo (region), a region in Serbia
- Braničevo Fortress, a fortress in Serbia, in Selo Kostolac
- Braničevo District, a district in Serbia
- Braničevo (Golubac), a village in Serbia, in the municipality of Golubac
- Serbian Orthodox Eparchy of Braničevo, an eparchy (diocese) of the Serbian Orthodox Church
- Siege of Braničevo (1154)
- Braničevo (magazine), a literary magazine published in Požarevac since 1955
