= Maria Komnene =

Maria Komnene or Comnena (Greek: Μαρία Κομνηνή) may refer to:

- Maria Komnene (daughter of Alexios I) (1085–after 1136), the second eldest daughter of Emperor Alexios I Komnenos and Irene Doukaina
- Maria Komnene, niece of Emperor Manuel I Komnenos and wife of the sebastos John Kantakouzenos
- Maria Komnene, Queen of Hungary (1144–1190), wife of Stephen IV of Hungary
- Maria Komnene (daughter of Manuel I) (1152–1182), the eldest daughter of Emperor Manuel I Komnenos and Bertha of Sulzbach
- Maria Komnene, Queen of Jerusalem (c. 1150–1208/17), second wife of King Amalric I of Jerusalem and mother of Isabella of Jerusalem
- Maria Komnene (1328-1408), daughter of Basil and sister of Alexios III of Trebizond
- Maria Komnene of Trebizond (1404-1439), third wife of Emperor John VIII Palaiologos and last Empress consort of the Byzantine Empire
