= Uroš II =

Grand Prince of Serbia
- Reign: c.1145–1155
- Predecessor: Uroš I
- Successor: Desa

Grand Prince of Serbia
- Reign: 1155–1162
- Predecessor: Desa
- Successor: Beloš
- Born: Before 1115; Serbia
- Died: 1162; Byzantine Empire
- Dynasty: Vukanović
- Father: Uroš I
- Mother: Anna
- Religion: Eastern Orthodoxy

Uroš II (Serbian: Урош II) was the Serbian Grand Prince from c.1145 to 1162. A member of the Vukanović dynasty and son of Uroš I, he ruled a Serbia which was dependent on the politics of the neighbouring powers of the Byzantine Empire and Kingdom of Hungary. Uroš II sought to rid Serbia of Byzantine supremacy, as his father had tried, and relied on his brother Beloš, the most influential at the Hungarian court through the dynastic marriage of their sister Jelena with Stephen II (r. 1116–1131) that produced Hungarian king Géza II (r. 1141–1162). Using the opportunity when Byzantine emperor Manuel I Komnenos fought the Normans, Uroš II revolted and raided Byzantine territory, which resulted in two Byzantine campaigns against Serbia in 1149–1150 which ended with Byzantine victory and renewal of vassal obligations. He swore fealty once again in 1153 after a planned rebellion, and was ousted in 1155 by the pro-Hungarian faction in Serbia that chose Desa, the youngest brother of Uroš and Beloš. Manuel however supported Uroš II and he was reinstated, ruling for many years as loyal to Byzantium, until another rebellion in 1162 led to his removal.

== Early life ==
Uroš II was the oldest son of Uroš I (r. 1112–1145). He was born before 1115. The identity of his mother remains unknown; Serbian chronicles mention Ana as the wife of Beli Uroš ("White Uroš"). He had two younger brothers, Beloš and Desa, and two sisters, Jelena and Marija.

In 1129–1130, Jelena married Hungarian prince Béla II, the heir of Hungarian king Stephen II (r. 1116–1131). Beloš also joined the Hungarian court, and both Jelena and Beloš became very influential. In 1134, Marija married Conrad II of Znojmo. This Hungarian–Serbian alliance could offer Uroš support in his fight for independence against the ever more powerful empire that managed to quell any previous uprising. In 1141, Géza II, the son of Béla II and Jelena, succeeded the Hungarian throne, and at this time, Beloš was the most powerful in the Hungarian court. In 1143, Manuel I Komnenos succeeded the Byzantine throne, and he inherited a strong and rising empire which had been mostly disengaged in the East to focus on Europe. Some time after 1143, Desa was invited by the old enemies of Radoslav of Duklja and came to rule Zeta and Travunija.

== Reign ==
The Serbian throne was succeeded by Uroš II in 1144 or 1145 (according to T. Živković), or 1143 or 1146 (according to Komatina). In 1146, Serbian military assistance was sent by Uroš II for Manuel's expedition against Seljuk sultan Mesud I. Desa's pressure on Duklja suggests Uroš II started his reign with anti-Byzantine political maneuvers, as Radoslav was a Byzantine vassal, and he had support in this through his brother Beloš at the Hungarian court.

In 1147, relations between European states were affected by the decision for a new Catholic Crusade, where German and French crusader armies would cross Byzantine territory in the Balkans (Belgrade–Braničevo–Niš–Serdica) and further into Asia Minor. Byzantine emperor Manuel entered an alliance with Conrad III of Germany, while Louis VII of France was allied with Siculo-Norman Roger II of Sicily. Roger II had Corfu taken from the Byzantines and started a war in autumn 1147. By 1148, the political situation in the Balkans was divided into the alliance of Byzantium and Venice, and that between the Siculo-Normans and Hungary. A Serbian revolt would need more fighting power and a wider battlefield, and thus, for the first time in history, Serbia joined a European anti-Byzantine alliance.

In 1149, Uroš II raided the Byzantine frontier while Manuel was planning to attack Roger II in Italy. Manuel learnt that the Normans, Hungary and Serbia had entered an alliance. The Serbian revolt had come as a shock, and it exposed Byzantine weaknesses in the control of the Balkans and in diplomacy. From Pelagonia, Manuel marched north, via the Kosovo field to Ras, which he quickly took, and left sebastohypertatos Constantine Angelos with a strong garrison while he continued the campaign, advancing into the Nikava province, part of Uroš II's crown land, and easily conquered the fortresses along the way, including Galič, where many were taken prisoner. The campaign had the mission to completely cut off the southern provinces of Uroš II and to secure the hinterland for the Byzantine army in continued warfare. While at Galič, Manuel received news that Uroš II clashed with Angelos at Ras. Uroš II attacked individual Byzantine detachments. Manuel set out, while Uroš II declined open pitched battle, using the harsh geography and withdrawing to the hinterland in the west or north-west. The estate of Uroš II were burnt down by Manuel. Manuel I's army was however unable to pursue the Serbs into the mountains, nor to capture Uroš II, and returned home to try again the next year. After the defeat in 1149, Uroš II went west of the Lim river and planned for war against the Byzantines. Judging by Manuel's swift and strong retaliation, leaving the campaign against Roger II, the Serbian revolt must have been of wider proportion and successful. The Serbs were not aided by any foreign power in 1149, perhaps due to Manuel's quick handling.

Manuel's campaign was not finished in 1149, as seen in the coming, much larger incursion again personally led by Manuel against Uroš II in 1150. According to Choniates, Uroš II behaved "worse than before", meaning he organized war against Byzantium. Manuel mustered a large army in Niš, which included prominent military commanders, which commenced at the end of the summer of 1150, "when the roads to Serbia become more suitable for the army". The Byzantines learnt that the Serbian army awaited military aid from Hungary. Uroš II had made extensive planning, mustering well-armed Serbs and župans (counts). From Serbian captives, Manuel learnt that the Hungarian aid had not yet joined the Serbian army, and thus led the Byzantine army onward. The Serbian army was supported by Hungarian cavalry that included non-Christian Khalisioi (who stayed at Syrmia). The Byzantine army clashed with the Serbian army most likely in what is today Mojkovac and its environs on both sides of the Tara. Choniates said Manuel had marched with "little preparation, as he deemed them unworthy opponents in battle", but the Serbs put up a much stiffer resistance than expected and boldly met the Byzantine army in battle. Manuel sought to tactically surprise the Serbian army which was well-informed on Byzantine military methods. The battle ended in Byzantine victory, and forced Uroš II to negotiate. Uroš II was humble and yielding, and Manuel forgave him, with Uroš II vowing that he "will always be a subject (doulos) to the Romans (Byzantines)". Uroš II promised 2,000 Serbian troops for the Byzantine army in the West and 500 (200 more than previously) for Asian campaigns. In essence, the results were renewal of vassal obligations. From then on, Uroš II enjoyed the support of Manuel.

In 1151, Manuel made a punitive expedition against Hungary, explicitly due to their aid to the Serbs, and entered Syrmia and besieged Zemun, with much prisoners and cattle, resulting in a Byzantine–Hungarian peace treaty. In Constantinople, Manuel paraded Hungarian and Serbian prisoners whom he had clothed in luxurious dress to impress the citizens. The Byzantines believed that Hungary would attack in 1152, and while both armies mustered, an attack never came. A new war came close in 1153, when Manuel's army moved northwards and was stopped at Serdica by Géza's deputies who offered immediate peace. After this, Manuel sought to punish Serbia, as it had continued to uphold relations with Hungary; Uroš II was unable to resist and without a struggle once again swore fealty. In the same year (1153), Manuel appointed his relative Andronikos Komnenos the governor of the frontier province towards Hungary and Serbia, including Niš, Braničevo, and perhaps Belgrade. Andronikos began conspiring with Hungary, Frederick Barbarossa, and Manuel's rivals, to take the Byzantine throne for himself. It is unknown whether he contacted Uroš II, though, in any case, Serbia was informed on this through the Hungarian court. Hungary planned for an offensive and gathered allied armies and mercenaries, as Andronikos' bid was a prospect of victory. The Byzantines learnt of the conspiracy and imprisoned Andronikos. Manuel's rival Roger II died in February 1154. In 1154, Hungary attacked Braničevo and clashed with the Byzantine army outside Belgrade, and the two signed peace in 1155.

In 1153 or 1155, the rivals of Uroš II ousted him and put his brother Desa, the ruler of Pomorje, on the throne. The cause of his ousting was the continued Byzantine vassalage, and Desa is deemed to have been a Hungarian ally. T. Živković believed it was Beloš who organized Desa to take the Serbian throne. The Serbian župani (counts) feared that Manuel would react, and knew that Uroš II had the support of Manuel, and thus asked him to arbitrate. There were two camps in Serbia, a pro-Byzantine and a pro-Hungarian; Uroš II was the leader of the Byzantine camp and was likely supported by the sons of Zavida. Manuel hosted the Serbian župani and Uroš II and Desa at Niš, and gave his support to, or chose Uroš II to rule Serbia, and used the occasion to affirm Byzantine power in the Balkans and impress German, French and Turkic emissaries present. Desa came to govern the province of Dendra towards Niš.

Uroš II continued his reign loyal to the Byzantine emperor. In 1160, he was asked by Manuel to command a Serbian unit in an expedition against the Sultanate of Rum. This however changed in 1162, during the Byzantine–Hungarian war, when he rose up once again, seeing the opportunity. As soon as Manuel was finished in the East, he dealt with Uroš II, although it is unknown whether there was an armed conflict, Uroš II was finally removed from the Serbian throne by Manuel and his brother Beloš succeeded him. Uroš II however received "very fertile territory", likely neighbouring Niš, and it seems he died soon after. Beloš left Serbia after a short while and returned to Hungary, and Desa succeeded the throne.

== Title ==
The title of Uroš II was veliki župan (Greek: archizoupanos, Serbion archizoupano). His title is found in various variations, such as Serbarches (Greek: Σερβάρχης, by Niketas Choniates), archiserbozoupanos (by Theodore Prodromos), satrap of Serbs (Greek: τῶν Σέρβων σατράπην, by Niketas Choniates and Michael of Thessaloniki, archaization for poetic purpose), iupanius in Rassa (in Chronicle of the Priest of Duklja), Serviam ... comitis magni (in Chronicon Pictum).

== Notes ==
1. John Kinnamos called him Primislav (Greek: Πριμίσθλαβος, Примислав), rendered Prvoslav (Првослав), regarding events in 1162, and he is the only one to use this name. Some historians earlier believed Primislav was a brother or cousin of Uroš II, but the consensus is that Uroš II and Primislav are one and the same.

== Sources ==
- Ferjančić, Božidar (1971). "Михаило Солунски". Византијски извори за историју народа Југославије, том IV. IV. Византолошки институт: 185–193.
- Kalić, Jovanka (1970). "Рашки велики жупан Урош II". Зборник радова Византолошког института. 12. Византолошки институт: 21–39.
- Kalić, Jovanka (1971a). "Јован Кинам" [Ioannis Kinnamos]. Византијски извори за историју народа Југославије, том IV. IV. Византолошки институт: 1–106.
- Kalić, Jovanka (1971b). "Никита Хонијат" [Niketas Choniates]. Византијски извори за историју народа Југославије, том IV. IV. Византолошки институт: 107–172.
- Kalić, Jovanka (1982). "Српски велики жупани у борби с Византијом". Историја српског народа. Vol. 1. pp. 197–211.
- Kalić, Jovanka (2016). "Grand Župan Uroš II of Rascia". Balcanica. XLVII: 75–96.
- Kartalija, Nebojša (2015). "Serbian Grand Prince Beloš as a Participant in the Hungarian-Rus' relations in the Mid-12th Century". COLLOQUIA RUSSICA: Rus' and Central Europe from the 11th to the 14th Century. 5. Krakow, Bratislava – via Academia.edu.
- Kartalija, Nebojša (2015). "Српско-угарски односи у контексту византијске спољне политике крајем XI и почетком XII века". Konteksti, Zbornik radova. Novi Sad: 571–580 – via Academia.edu.
- Komatina, Ivana; Komatina, Predrag (2021). "Family Patrimony and the Legacy of the First-Born Son. Some Examples From European Monarchies in the 11th–12th Centuries". Istraživanja. 32: 36–54.
- Leśny, Jan (1989). "Stefan Zavida als Sohn von Uros I. und Vater von Stefan Nemanja: Ein Beitrag zur serbischen Prosopographie". Südost-Forschungen. 48: 37–49.
- Magdalino, Paul (2002). The Empire of Manuel I Komnenos, 1143-1180 (illustrated, reprint ed.). Cambridge University Press. ISBN 0521526531.
- Novaković, Relja (1979). "Још нешто поводом битке на Тари 1150. године". Историјски часопис. 25–26: 5– – via Google Books.
- Pirivatrić, Srđan (2011). "Manuel i Komnenos, „Carski san" and „Samodržci oblasti srpskog prestola"" (PDF). Зборник радова Византолошког института (48). National Library of Serbia: 89–118. doi:10.2298/zrvi1148089p. ISSN 0584-9888.
- Stephenson, Paul (2004) [2000]. Byzantium's Balkan Frontier: A Political Study of the Northern Balkans, 900–1204. Cambridge University Press. pp. 224-. ISBN 978-0-521-77017-0.
- Živković, Tibor (2006). Портрети српских владара: IX-XII век [Portraits of Serbian Rulers: IX-XII century]. Завод за уџбенике и наставна средства, Београд. ISBN 9788617137548.

Regnal titles
Preceded by Uroš I	Grand Prince of Serbia c.1145–1155	Succeeded by Desa
Preceded by Desa	Grand Prince of Serbia; 1155–1162	Succeeded by Beloš
