= Ban Borić =

12th century Bosnian ruler

Borić

Ban of Bosnia
- Office: fl. 1154–1163
- Predecessor: Ladislaus II of Hungary 1137–1159 as Duke of Bosnia
- Successor: Stephen IV of Hungary 1165–1180 as King of Hungary
- Born: before 1154
- Died: after 1163
- Noble family: Borićević (as progenitor)
- Occupation: head of state

Borić (fl. 1154–63) was the first known by name Ban of Bosnia, and progenitor of Borićević royal house. He was appointed Ban of Bosnia in 1154, during Byzantine-Hungarian conflicts, nominally a Hungarian vassal, he was last mentioned in 1163.

== Rule ==
Borić is mentioned by Byzantine Greek historian John Kinnamos in his history book covering years 1118–1176, where he was referred as Hungarian ally, not a vassal as often considered by historiography. The first certain mention regards 1154, when the Byzantine-Hungarian war was underway, with engagements in the Danube area. Hungarian king Géza II surrounded Byzantine-held Braničevo (in Serbia) and devastated the surrounding area. Part of this Hungarian force was Hungarian vassal Borić, the ban of Bosnia, and a Bohemian detachment. Kinnamos described Borić as "exarch (governor) of the land/country of Bosnia". When the Hungarian force raised the siege of Braničevo and headed west for Belgrade, Byzantine emperor Manuel I Komnenos sent a detachment to attack the Bosnian troops. However, that Byzantine detachment clashed with the main Hungarian force and was decisively defeated.

It is uncertain how and when Borić came to rule Bosnia. According to Vladimir Ćorović, he was not a native Bosnian; it is believed that his origins should have been trace in Slavonia, in the Grabarje area in župa Požega. As Hungary became the overlord of Bosnia in the 1130s, and it has been claimed in historiography that Borić was appointed governor in Bosnia as a Hungarian vassal, and was obliged to participate in the march on Braničevo. However, currently it is believed that he was an ally of the Hungarians not a vassal.

== Later years ==
There is no mention of Borić until 1163, by which time Géza II was deceased (31 May 1162) and there was a civil war in Hungary regarding the inheritance of the throne – Géza's brothers Ladislaus and Stephen IV rose up against crowned heir Stephen III. Ladislaus managed to gain the throne, but he died shortly afterwards (14 January 1163), upon which Stephen IV took it with Byzantine help. Borić supported Stephen IV, presumably due to assurance that Stephen IV would, as a Byzantine protege, stand. In 1163 at Esztergom, Stephen IV issued a charter in which he confirmed ban Beloš's decision that the Dubrava forest belongs to the Bishopric of Zagreb; among witnesses were Borić, listed after Beloš, a Hungarian court member and palatine, and before other counts. Also, with the permit of Stephen IV, Borić in 1162–63 gifted the village of Zdelje (Esdel) to the Templars in Slavonia, later confirmed by kings Béla III and Andrew II (in 1209), as part of further gifts of his descendants.

In 1163, the intended heir Stephen III defeated Stephen IV and eventually plead to Byzantium. The new king then chased after Stephen IV's supporters–and his enemies–including ban Borić. Gesta Hunnorum et Hungarorum (ca. 1282–85) says that a "miles (soldier) Gotfridus" went after the lord of Bosnia, whom he defeated, on the order of the Hungarian king. After this, mentions of Borić in Bosnia disappear. From ca. 1166, Bosnia was a Byzantine province.

== Legacy ==
Borić's descendants are sometimes referred to as the Boričević. He had sons, Borić and Pavao, and his grandsons were called Odola, Čelk and Borić. The extended family also included Detmar and Benedikt (also called Borić). In the 13th century his descendants had possessions on both sides of the river Sava, in the eastern and western parts of what is now the Požega County.

An undated charter of Borić to the Benedictine monastery on Lokrum was proven to be a forgery from the 13th century.

== See also ==
- Banate of Bosnia

== Annotations ==
1. His common name is Serbo-Croatian renderings Borić, Borič Serbian Cyrillic: Борић.
2. In Greek, his title was "Exarch of the country of Bosnia" (Βορίτξης ὁ Βόσθνης χώρας ἔξάρχων), according to John Kinnamos. In Latin, his title was "Ban of Bosnia" (banus Boricius de Bosna), according to the 1209 charter of Andrew II.
3. Simeon Bogdanović–Siniša claimed that Ana, the wife of Serbian Grand Prince Stefan Nemanja, was the daughter of Borić, however, he thought that Borić and Boris Kalamanos were the same person (when in fact, Boris died in 1154, and Borić was alive in 1163), thus Ana would have been the daughter of Boris.

== Sources and further reading ==
Books

- Ćorović, Vladimir (1940a). Historija Bosne. Srpska kraljevska akademija.
- Kristó, Gyula; Makk, Ferenc (1996). Az Árpád-ház uralkodói [Rulers of the House of Árpád] (in Hungarian). I.P.C. Könyvek. ISBN 963-7930-97-3.
- Švab, Mladen (1989). "BORIČ (Borić, Boricius, Bogir, ßoρίτζης)". Croatian Biographical Lexicon (in Croatian). Miroslav Krleža Lexicographical Institute.
- "Borić (Borič, Boricius)". Croatian Encyclopedia (in Croatian). Miroslav Krleža Lexicographical Institute.
- Niebuhr, Barthold Georg (1836). Corpus scriptorum historiae byzantinae. impensis E. Weberi. pp. 343–.
- Moravcsik, Gyula (1984). Az Árpád-kori magyar történet bizánci forrásai. Akadémiai Kiad. ISBN 9789630526708. "Βορίτζης ό Βόσθνης χώρας έξάρχων"

Journals

- Ćorović, Vladimir (1940b). "Ban Borić i njegovi potomci" [Ban Borić and his descendants]. Глас СКА. CLXXXII. Belgrade: SKA: 47–61.
- Nedeljković, B. M. (1960). "Postojbina prvog bosanskog bana Boriča". IČ (9–10): 55–69.
- Karbić, Marija (2005). "Posjedi plemićkog roda Borića bana do sredine XIV. stoljeća" [Landed estates of the noble lineage of Borić Ban until the middle of the 14th century]. Scrinia Slavonica (in Croatian). 5 (5). Croatian Historical Institute - Department of History of Slavonia, Srijem and Baranja: 48–61.
- Živković, Tibor (2008). "Бан Борић". Зборник за историју Босне и Херцеговине. 5: 49–60.

Regnal titles
| First Renewal of statehood | Ban of Bosnia fl. 1154–1163 | Vacant Byzantine rule Title next held by Kulin |
