= Siege of Braničevo =

Battle during the Byzantine–Hungarian War (1149–1155)

- Part of the Byzantine–Hungarian War (1149–1155)
Date	Late 1154
Location	Braničevo, Byzantine Empire (now Serbia)
Result	Abandoned siege, Hungarian retreat

Belligerents
Hungary: Banate of Bosnia	Byzantine Empire

Commanders and leaders
Géza II; Ban Borić	

Units involved
Cuman unit Bohemian unit Foreign mercenaries	

The siege of Braničevo was laid by Hungarian king Géza II against Byzantine-held Braničevo in late 1154.

== Background ==
Emperor Manuel's cousin, Andronikos Komnenos, who administered Belgrade, Braničevo, and Niš sent a letter to Géza II in 1154, offering to hand over those towns to him in exchange for his support against the emperor. Géza II sent his envoys to Sicily to sign a new alliance with William I of Sicily around the end of the year, but William I was fighting with his rebellious subjects.

== Siege ==
Although Andronikos' plot was discovered and he was captured, Géza II invaded the Byzantine Empire and laid siege to Braničevo fortress in late 1154. Géza II was aided by Cumans, who had been raiding the Danube at the time. As a Hungarian vassal, Borić, the ban of Bosnia took part in the attack, alongside a Bohemian detachment. Braničevo was besieged and the surroundings were ravaged. After hearing of the imprisonment of Andronikos, Géza II abandoned the siege and returned for Hungary.

== Aftermath ==
Manuel answered by dispatching troops towards the battlefield. Through Serdica (Sofia) and Niš, Manuel arrived in the Smilis province near Paraćin where he set up camp. The Hungarian Army retreated towards Belgrade. The pursuing Byzantine troops, under general Basil Tzintzilukes, entered into battle with them, but the Byzantines were annihilated before the Hungarians returned to Hungary.

In early 1155, the Byzantine and Hungarian envoys signed a new peace treaty. In the same year, a Byzantine army expelled Géza II's ally, Desa, from Serbia and restored Uroš II who had promised that he would not enter into an alliance with Hungary.

== See also ==
- Battle of Sirmium (1167)

== Sources ==
- Fine, John V. A (1991). The Early Medieval Balkans: A Critical Survey from the Sixth to the Late Twelfth century. The University of Michigan Press. ISBN 0-472-08149-7.
- Makk, Ferenc (1989). The Árpáds and the Comneni: Political Relations between Hungary and Byzantium in the 12th century. Translated by György Novák. Akadémiai Kiadó. ISBN 963-05-5268-X.
- Stephenson, Paul (2000). Byzantium's Balkan Frontier: A Political Study of the Northern Balkans, 900–1204. Cambridge University Press. ISBN 978-0-521-02756-4.
