= Giphardos =

- Military career
- Allegiance: Byzantine Empire
- Rank: doux of Thrakesion

Alexios Giphardos (fl. 1148–1160), known simply as Giphardos, was a Byzantine commander that served emperor Manuel I Komnenos (r. 1143–1180). His name implies Norman origin, however, he was not regarded barbarian and it might have been a distant ancestry. Giphardos was experienced, having fought many battles, and commanded Byzantine troops against the Cumans in 1148 and the Serbian-Hungarian force at Tara in 1150. At Tara, he and Michael Branas and other commanders were caught in danger, but were saved by Manuel I. He served as the envoy to the sultan of Ikonion in c. 1158. He was appointed the doux of Thrakesion, and bishop Georgios Tornikes of Ephesos claimed he had taken his office only due to Giphardos' administrative and military skills.

== Sources ==
- Kalić, Jovanka (1971). "Јован Кинам". Византијски извори за историју народа Југославије, том IV. IV. Византолошки институт: 1–106.
- Müller, Samuel Pablo (2021). Latins in Roman (Byzantine) Histories: Ambivalent Representations in the Long Twelfth Century. BRILL. ISBN 978-90-04-49970-6.
