= Byzantine–Norman war (1147–1149) =

War in Greece

- Part of the Byzantine–Norman wars
Date	autumn 1147–late summer 1149
Location	Mediterranean, Greece
Result	Byzantine victory

Belligerents
Siculo-Normans	Byzantine Empire

Commanders and leaders
Roger II of Sicily; George of Antioch	Manuel I Komnenos; Axouch; Kontostephanos †

The Byzantine–Norman war was fought between the Byzantine Empire and Siculo-Norman Roger II of Sicily in 1147–1149.

== Background ==
Following the crossing of the Crusader armies to Anatolia, Manuel I Komnenos received two news, the first that the German army had been decimated at Dorylaion by the Seljuk Turks, the second, that Roger II of Sicily had sailed against his empire.

== History ==
=== 1147 takeover of Corfu and attacks on the Greek coast ===
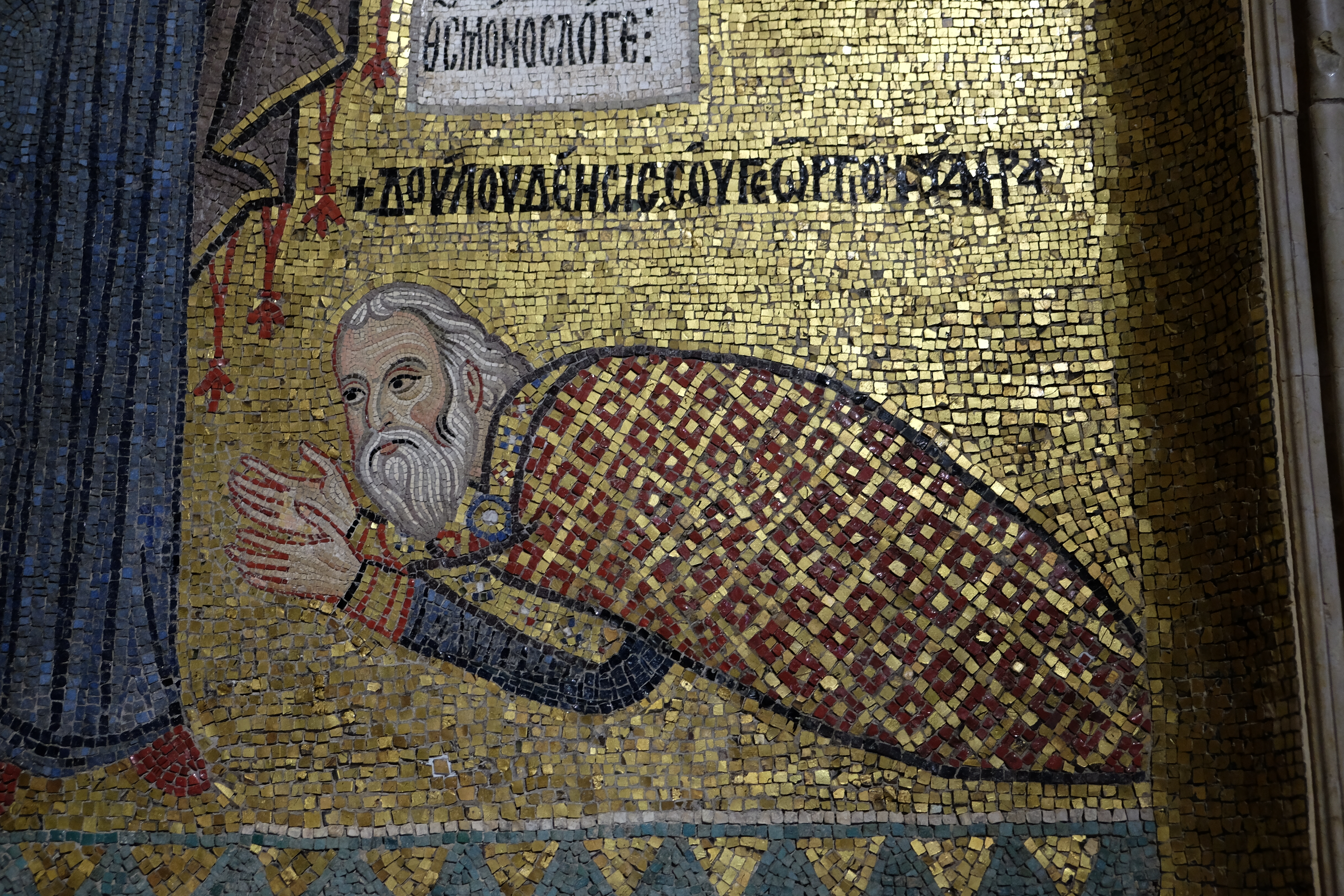
George of Antioch on a mosaic in his endowment church.

The Sicilian fleet was commanded by the renegade Byzantine Greek now turned Siculo-Norman admiral George of Antioch, who received lavish titles from the Normans. His ships left Otranto in autumn 1147 for Corfu, just across the Adriatic. Corfu was taken without struggle, as the citizens were tired of the high taxes and were won over by the promising words of George. A Siculo-Norman garrison of 1,000 at Corfu was accepted. George's fleet then left detachments on the Peloponnese, reached Euboea and quickly raided Athens. After reaching the Ionian islands, George headed up the Corinthian Gulf and ravaged the coastal towns. He tried but failed to take Monemvasia. Niketas Choniates called him "a sea-monster, swallowing everything in its path". One of his parties raided silk centre Thebes, and female workers were brought back to Palermo.

=== Byzantine–Venetian alliance and preparations ===
Manuel was disgusted that Christians (including the Greek admiral) had used the Second Crusade to attack the empire. Roger II was deemed an occupier of Sicily, and Manuel believed he would manage in destroying him, which the West had failed to do. After the passing of the Crusader armies and brokering truce with the Seljuk Turks, Manuel set off to deal with the Siculo-Normans and conquer their territory for Byzantium. Manuel found an ally in Venice, which was threatened by Siculo-Norman sea power. A Siculo-Norman blockade of the Adriatic, through controlling Corfu, would seriously threaten Venetian trade. In March 1148 a Byzantine–Venetian treaty was finalized with Venetian trading privileges in Cyprus, Rhodos and Constantinople, in return for six months of full command of the Venetian fleet.

Manuel meanwhile worked on readying the Byzantine navy, and had under him 500 galleys and 1,000 transport and supply boats. The Byzantine army numbered 20–30,000, and was under the command of megas domestikos Axouch, while the navy was entrusted to his brother-in-law megas doux Stephanos Kontostephanos. Readying to embark from Marmara, the preparations for the Sicilian campaign were halted by the sudden incursion of Cumans cross the Danube, the death of the doge of Venice, and heavy storms in the eastern Mediterranean.

=== 1148–1149 siege of Corfu ===
In autumn 1148 the Byzantine and Venetian navies joined up and blockaded Corfu, while the Byzantine army was held back by dealing with the Cumans and then being blocked from setting out with the snowing of the Pindus. Conrad III fell ill after the fiasco at Dorylaion and was nursed back to health by Manuel at Constantinople, and then left for Palestine in March 1148 with Manuel's ships. Immediately after, Manuel joined the siege of Corfu. The chance of military victory was small, and the Byzantines decided to starve the Siculo-Norman garrison to surrender, but their provisions would last a year and potentially the Sicilian navy could arrive with supplies. Kontostephanos fell during the siege, having been hit with a stone while supervising a siege engine, and Axouch then took command of the fleet.

Byzantine–Venetian relations were not good; the navies did not communicate and the Venetians occupied a neighbouring islet and killed some Greek merchants and came over a Byzantine flagship which they paraded with a dressed-up Ethiopian slave as being crowned Emperor. Manuel wished not to react at the time, as he needed Venetian help in the siege, and by now held the general command of the Byzantine besieging force. The Byzantine troops and Venetian auxiliaries occupied the city but the Normans were holed up in the citadel. Attempts to assault the citadel with ladders from ships failed, as the weight of the soldiers broke the ladders. After some months, by the late summer 1149, Corfu fell into Byzantine hands, likely through treachery—winning over the garrison commander. Manuel left a garrison of "stalwart Germans".

=== George's Aegean raid and parade outside Constantinople ===
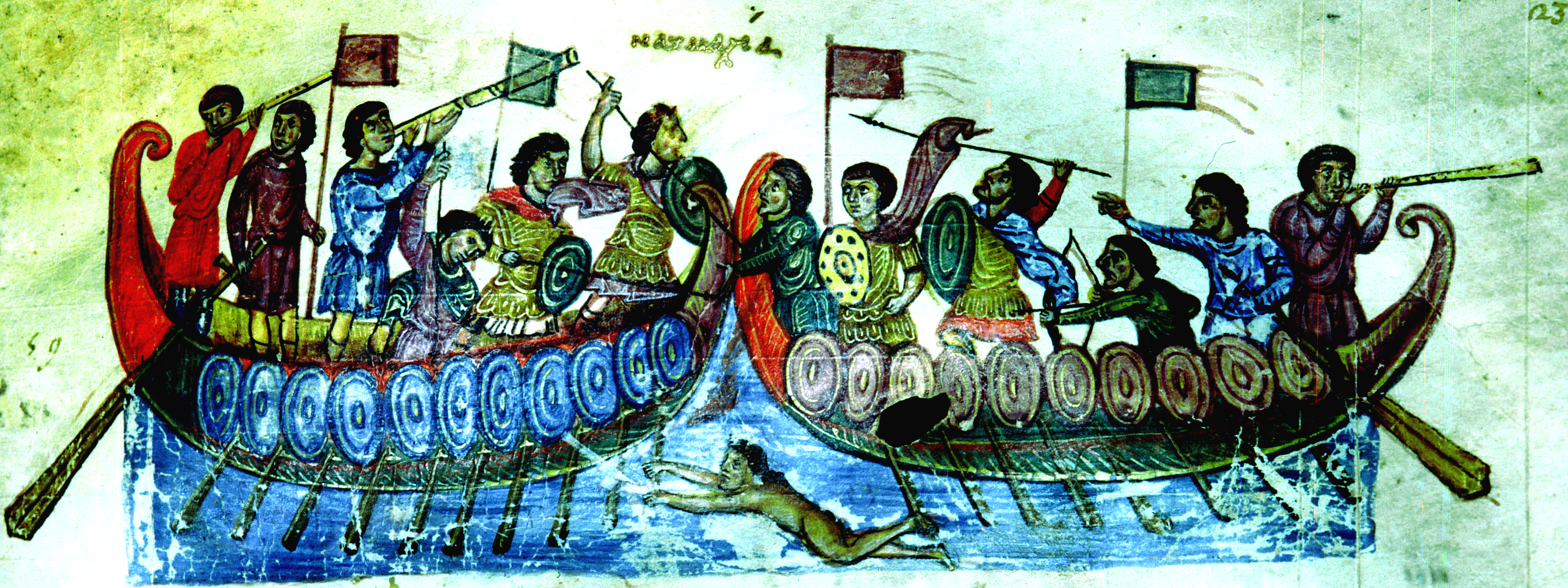
Sea battle (naumachia), 13th-century miniature.

During the siege of Corfu, Roger II may have sent George to raid the Aegean as a diversion. With forty ships, he arrived outside Constantinople but failed to disembark, and then plundered rich villas and shot some arrows into the palace grounds. George paraded his ships outside Constantinople, but was intercepted on his return by a detachment under Choroup from Corfu and heavily defeated near Cape Malea. Supposedly, Louis VII of France was caught up in the naval battle as he returned from the Crusade (the failed Battle of Mount Cadmus) on a Sicilian ship.

== Aftermath ==
After forcing the besieged at Corfu into submission in the summer of 1149, Manuel I divided his army into two, with one part left with Axouch at Avlona to cross into Italy and use Ancona as a base of operations while he took the other part to the Balkans, having learnt of an uprising by the Serbs in Raška, encouraged by Roger II, while Manuel was preoccupied with the siege of Corfu. The Serbian revolt had come as a shock, and it exposed Byzantine weaknesses in the control of the Balkans and in diplomacy.

Roger was connected with the Hungarian royal family through his cousin who married king Coloman. Hungary aided the Serbian uprising and it seemed more than likely that Roger stood behind it. At the same time, Roger financed rival German princes under Count Welf VI against Conrad III. On 29 July 1149, Roger met Louis VII at Potenza, and suggested the elimination of Manuel and "his schismatic empire" and then to start the Third Crusade. However this anti-Byzantine alliance failed.

== Annotations ==
1. The events are known in historiography as "the Western campaigns" and "campaign of 1147–49", "siege of Corfu", "siege of Kerkyra", etc.

== Sources ==
- Birkenmeier, John W. (2002). "The Campaigns of Manuel I Komnenos". The Development of the Komnenian Army: 1081–1180. Brill. ISBN 90-04-11710-5.
- Magdalino, Paul (2002) [1993]. The Empire of Manuel I Komnenos, 1143–1180. Cambridge: Cambridge University Press. ISBN 0-521-52653-1.
- Norwich, John J. (1995). Byzantium: The Decline and Fall. Alfred A. Knopf, Inc. ISBN 0-679-41650-1.
- Pryor, John; Jeffreys, Elizabeth M. (2006-07-01). The Age of the ΔΡΟΜΩΝ: The Byzantine Navy ca 500-1204. BRILL. ISBN 978-90-474-0993-9.
