= John Kantakouzenos (sebastos) =

Byzantine general

John Kantakouzenos (Greek: Ἱωάννης Καντακουζηνός; died 17 September 1176) was a military commander and an early member of the Kantakouzenos family.

He distinguished himself in the campaigns of Manuel I Komnenos (r. 1143–1180) against the Serbians, Hungarians, and Pechenegs in the years between 1150 and 1153. It was during these campaigns that he was severely wounded and lost the fingers of one hand during the Battle of Tara in 1150. In 1155 he was sent to Belgrade where he foiled the plot of the inhabitants of that city to hand the city over to the Hungarians. He was killed in the Battle of Myriokephalon, where he served as a commander of a division of the Byzantine army. He fell, having been isolated from his own troops, fighting alone against a band of Seljuk Turk soldiers of the Sultanate of Rum.

John is known to have been present at the ecclesiastical councils convened at Constantinople in May 1157, March 1166, and January and February 1170. In the acts of those councils he is described as holding the rank of sebastos, and ranks first in the class of the sebastoi.

John Kantakouzenos was married to Maria Komnene, the eldest daughter of Manuel I's brother, the sebastokrator Andronikos Komnenos. They had at least one son, Manuel Kantakouzenos, who campaigned against the Turks with Andronikos Angelos, but afterwards offended Emperor Manuel I, who put him in prison where he was blinded. A branch of the Byzantine Kantakouzenos may have later arrived in Romanian lands and became known as the Cantacuzino family.

== Sources ==
- Nicol, Donald M. (1968). The Byzantine Family of Kantakouzenos (Cantacuzenus), ca. 1100–1460: A Genealogical and Prosopographical Study. Dumbarton Oaks studies 11. Washington, DC: Dumbarton Oaks Center for Byzantine Studies. OCLC 390843.
- Stiernon, Lucien (1965). "Notes de titulature et de prosopographie byzantines: Sébaste et gambros". Revue des études byzantines. 23: 222–243. doi:10.3406/rebyz.1965.1349.
