= Battle of the Fischa =

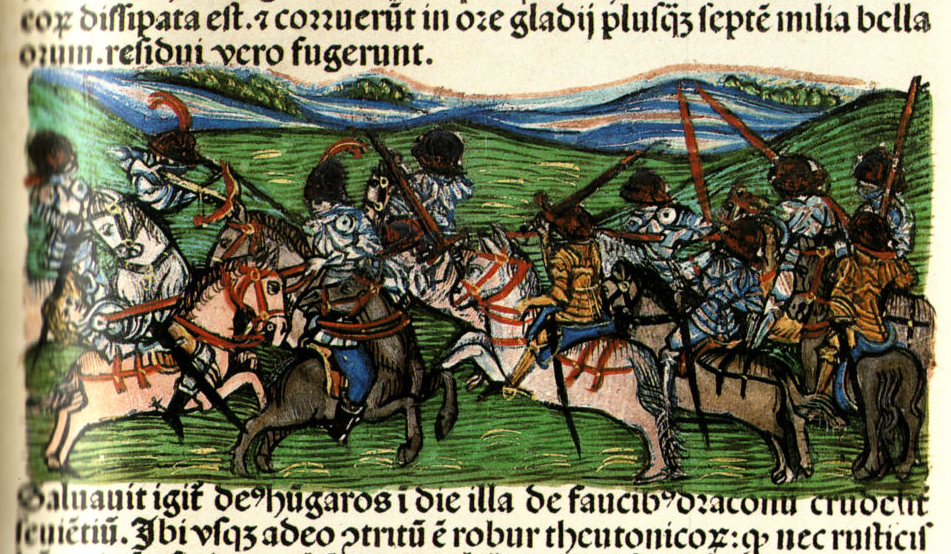
- The battle depicted in the Chronica Hungarorum
Date	11 September 1146
Location	Fischa River, border of Austria and Hungary
Result	Hungarian victory

Belligerents
Kingdom of Hungary	Duchy of Bavaria: March of Austria

Commanders and leaders
King Géza II; Beloš Vukanović	Henry XI, Duke of Bavaria

Strength
Unknown; also Cumans, Pechenegs and Székelys	Unknown

Casualties and losses
3,000 (According to Hungarian chronicles)	More than 7,000 (According to Hungarian chronicles)

The Battle of the Fischa or Battle of the Leitha took place on 11 September 1146 near the Fischa River at the border of the Kingdom of Hungary and the March of Austria, which then belonged to the overlordship of the Dukes of Bavaria and it was ruled by margraves of the Franconian Babenberg dynasty.

== The events ==
The opponents were a Bavarian army led by duke Henry XI and the Hungarian army under the leadership of king Géza II and his uncle, the palatine Beloš Vukanović, who formerly served as regent and tutor for the underage king. Both sides lined up significant armies. Before the battle, Géza was girded with a sword, meaning that the young king entered adulthood in the eyes of his people.

Henry's scouts didn't manage to inform him properly about the movement of the Hungarian army. Due to this, he didn't know that the Hungarians crossed the Leitha and, seeing a lot of smoke, he thought that they retreated and set their encampments on fire. When he launched his assault, he was surprised when he met the Hungarian assault half way through. Despite this, the Germans heavy cavalry gained the upper hand against the Székely and Pecheneg vanguard, who suffered hefty losses.

Then intense fighting began between the Bavarian forces and the Hungarian second line of defense. In the end, Belos managed to get behind the Germans, turning the tides of the battle. Géza's cavalry charge of about 12 000 reservists gave the final blow to them. Henry was forced to retreat and the Hungarians pursued them until the Fischa river.
