= Zemplínsky Branč =

Zemplínsky Branč Barancs
- Municipality
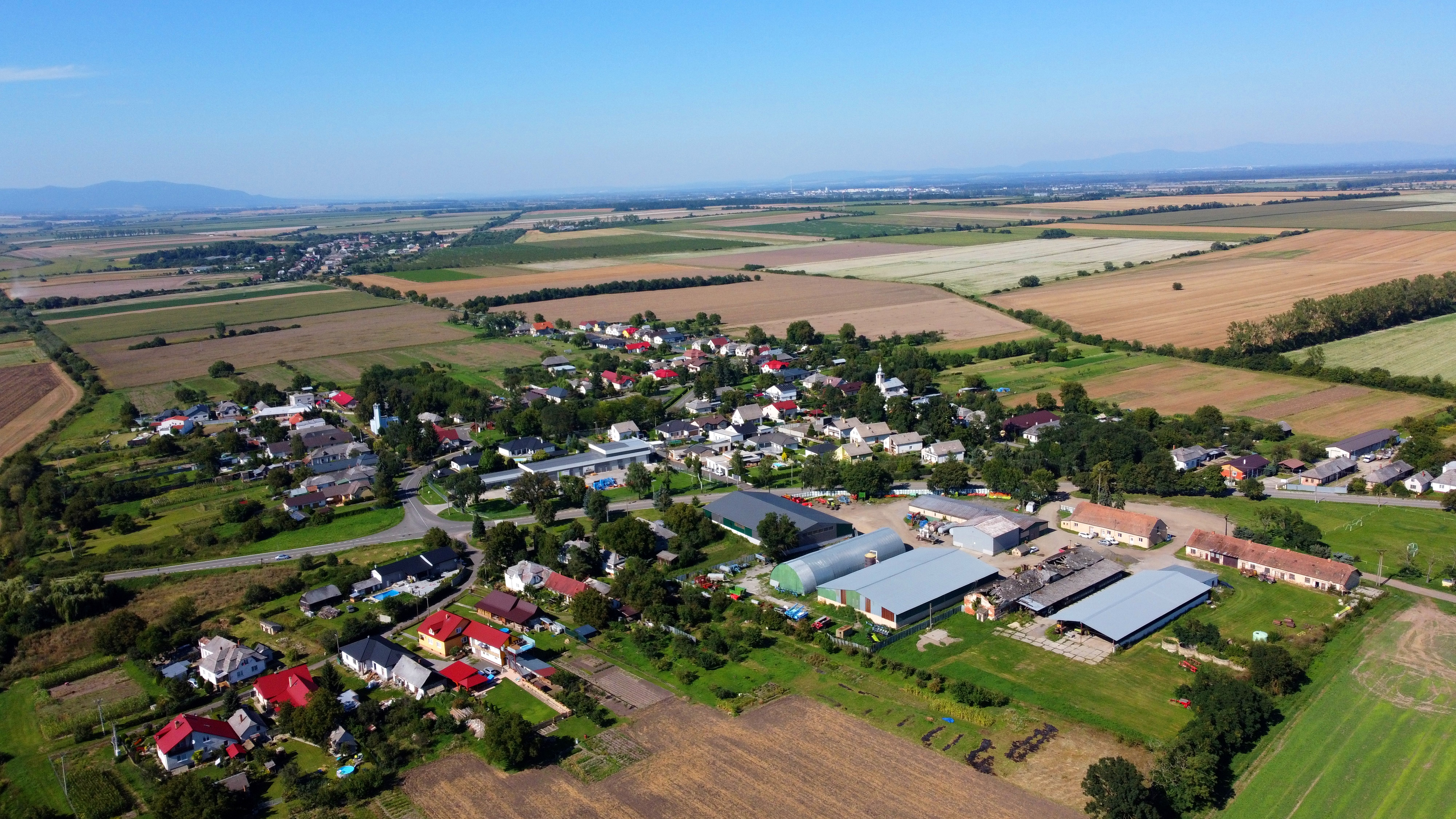

- Flag

- Location of Zemplínsky Branč in the Košice Region Location of Zemplínsky Branč in Slovakia
- Coordinates: 48.55°N 21.73°E
- Country: Slovakia
- Region: Košice Region
- District: Trebišov District
- First mentioned: 1273

Government
  - Mayor: Viera Tóthová (Hlas)

Area
  - Total: 7.25 km^{2} (2.80 sq mi)
- Elevation: 108 m (354 ft)

Population (2025)
  - Total: 527
- Time zone: UTC+1 (CET)
  - Summer (DST): UTC+2 (CEST)
- Postal code: 760 2
- Area code: +421 56
- Vehicle registration plate (until 2022): TV
- Website: www.zemplinskybranc.sk

Zemplínsky Branč (Hungarian: Barancs) is a village and municipality in the Trebišov District in the Košice Region of south-eastern Slovakia.

== History ==
In historical records the village was first mentioned in 1273.

== Geography ==
The municipality lies at an altitude of 108 metres (354 ft) and covers an area of 7.25 km^{2} (2.80 sq mi) (2025).

== Population ==
Population statistic (10 years)
| Year | 1995 | 2005 | 2015 | 2025 |
|---|---|---|---|---|
| Count | 387 | 489 | 476 | 527 |
| Difference | | +26.35% | −2.65% | +10.71% |

Population statistic
| Year | 2024 | 2025 |
|---|---|---|
| Count | 508 | 527 |
| Difference | | +3.74% |

It has a population of 527 people (31 December 2025).

=== Ethnicity ===
Census 2021 (1+ %)
| Ethnicity | Number | Fraction |
|---|---|---|
| Slovak | 464 | 92.06% |
| Romani | 26 | 5.15% |
| Not found out | 17 | 3.37% |
| Total | 504 | |

In year 2021 was 504 people by ethnicity 464 as Slovak, 26 as Romani, 17 as Not found out, 2 as Czech, 2 as Hungarian, 1 as Russian and 1 as Bulgarian.

Note on population: The difference values of population numbers in the table "Population statistic" and in the sections "Ethnicity" & "Religion" is caused by the use of various statistical methods.

=== Religion ===
Census 2021 (1+ %)
| Religion | Number | Fraction |
|---|---|---|
| Roman Catholic Church | 352 | 69.84% |
| None | 58 | 11.51% |
| Greek Catholic Church | 38 | 7.54% |
| Not found out | 25 | 4.96% |
| Calvinist Church | 11 | 2.18% |
| Eastern Orthodox Church | 7 | 1.39% |
| Total | 504 | |

In year 2021 was 504 people by religion 352 from Roman Catholic Church, 58 from None, 38 from Greek Catholic Church, 25 from Not found out, 11 from Calvinist Church, 7 from Eastern Orthodox Church, 5 from Ad hoc movements, 3 from Evangelical Church, 2 from Islam, 2 from Other and 1 from Buddhism.

== Facilities ==
The village has a public library and a football pitch
