= Michael of Thessaloniki =

- Occupation: orator, master of rhetoric, professor, legal advisory
- Language: Greek
- Education: Constantinople
- Period: mid-12th century
- Years active: fl. 1149–1156

Michael of Thessaloniki (Serbian: Михаило Солунски; fl. 1149–1156) was a 12th-century Byzantine orator. There is not much information about Michael in modern sources. He was one of the most prominent Byzantine orators of the 12th century, and held the title of "master of rhetoric", which was synonymous to the position of professor at the Patriarchal College of Constantinople in Hagia Sophia. At the same time, he was also a professor of evangelicals at the same school, and he also held the title of protekdikos, the chief legal advisory to the bishop, part of the exokatakoiloi. His career ended in 1156, when he was accused of being a follower of the heresy of Patriarch of Antioch, Sotirios Pantevgenos. Pantevgenos was condemned on 26 January 1156 for his heretical interpretation of the Eucharistic liturgy.

Michael wrote four speeches (or sermons) between 1149 and 1156 dedicated to Byzantine emperor Manuel I Komnenos (1143–1180), which praised his military victories in all frontiers of the empire, in the east against the Seljuk Turks, and in the west against the Siculo-Normans, Hungary and Serbia. The sermons are valuable sources for Byzantine-Serbian relations in the mid-12th century, and in many ways complement the information of John Kinnamos (1143–1185) and Niketas Choniates (1155–1217), the basic sources for 12th-century Byzantine history.

== See also ==
- Theodore Prodromos

== Sources ==
- Ferjančić, Božidar (1971). "Михаило Солунски". Византијски извори за историју народа Југославије. Vol. IV. Византолошки институт. pp. 185–193.
