= Braničevo Fortress =

Bulgarian fortress

Coordinates: 44°44′15″N 21°11′30″E

Braničevo Fortress is an archaeological site of medieval fortress whose remains are situated in the village of Kostolac, in Serbia, about 130km East of Belgrade and 24 km from North East of Požarevac. It consists of two medieval fortified structures located in Mali Grad and Veliki Grad, on the right bank of the Danube and above Dunavac and the Mlava River.

== History ==
Medieval Braničevo developed in the area of the former Roman and Early Byzantine city and legionary fort Viminacium. The fortress was located on an ancient Roman road that was still in use during the Middle Ages. The main road known as Via Militaris connected the medieval cities of Belgrade, Braničevo and Niš. Braničevo was of great importance from the 10th to the 13th centuries. For most of that period, since it was located on the Danube frontier, it was the subject of the Byzantine-Hungarian conflicts (1127–1129, 1149–1155, 1162–1167). The fortresses of Belgrade, Morava and Braničevo on the Danube border were of great importance as Byzantine strongholds. The emperors John II Komnenos and Manuel I Komnenos stayed in Braničevo. Also, Braničevo and the other two towns were used as bases for military campaigns in Hungary. The town of Braničevo became the main strategic defensive point of the region, while the Braničevo fortress' purpose was to defend the Morava valley, a central access point leading to Constantinople and Thessaloniki.

After the death of Emperor Manuel I, the Hungarian King Béla III first seized the areas between Belgrade and Braničevo. Then, utilizing the road Via Militaris, he led a successful military campaign in 1183 and captured Niš to Sofia. At the end of the 12th century, Byzantium regained Braničevo and the Danube border, but finally lost this territory after the 4th Crusade and the First Fall of Constantinople.

During the 11th and 12th centuries; Braničevo, the road Via Militaris and the Balkans played a significant role for western travelers and pilgrims on their way to the Holy Land.

In 1147, the two armies of the Second Crusade led by German king Konrad III Hohenstaufen and Louis VII of France passed through via Braničevo. During the Third Crusade, Barbarossa's army passed through via Braničevo and Via Militaris. One of the more significant Via Militaris travelers of that time was Muhammad Al-Idrisi, a great scholar. Idrisi describes the relatively large trading towns on the Roman Military Road or the Byzantine Imperial Road from Belgrade to Constantinople.

An excavation of the site in 2011 revealed a set of marver purple glass vessels dating back to the 12th century. Seals belonging to Byzantine administrators were also documented.

== Sources ==
- Spasić-Đurić, Dragana (2016). "A Note on New Archaeological Explorations in Byzantine Braničevo". In Bikić, Vesna (ed.). Byzantine Heritage and Serbian Art I: Processes of Byzantinisation and Serbian Archaeology. Serbian Academy of Arts and Sciences. ISBN 978-8-6519-2005-2.
- D’Amato, Raffaele; Spasić-Đurić, Dragana (2018). "The Phrygian Helmet in Byzantium-Archaeology and Iconography in The Light of Recent Findings from Braničevo". Acta Militaria Mediaevalia. 14: 29–67.
- Ivanišević, Vujadin (2018). "Novi vizantijski pečati iz Morave (Margum) i Braničeva" [New Byzantine Seals from Morava (Margum) and Braničevo]. Starinar (68): 111–124. doi:10.2298/STA1868111I. hdl:21.15107/rcub_dais_11881.
- Spasić-Đurić, Dragana; Jovanović, Sonja (2018). "A 12th century set of marvered purple glass vessels from Braničevo (Serbia)" (PDF). Starinar (68): 151–173. doi:10.2298/STA1868151S.
- Theotokis, Georgios; Yildiz, Aysel (2018). A Military History of the Mediterranean Sea: Aspects of War, Diplomacy, and Military Elites. BRILL. ISBN 978-9-0043-6204-8.
- Kosztolnyik, Z. J. (1987). From Coloman the Learned to Béla III (1095-1196): Hungarian Domestic Policies and Their Impact Upon Foreign Affairs. Columbia University Press. ISBN 088033116X.
- Madgearu, Alexandru (2013). Byzantine Military Organization on the Danube, 10th-12th Centuries. BRILL. ISBN 978-9-0042-5249-3.
- Madgearu, Alexandru (2016). The Asanids: The Political and Military History of the Second Bulgarian Empire (1185-1280). BRILL. ISBN 978-9-0043-3319-2.
- Kalić, Jovanka (1984). "Niš au Moyen Age" [Niš during the Middle Ages]. Историјски часопис. 31. Istorijski institut Beograd.
- Petrović, Vladeta (2013). "Terrestrial Communications in the Late Antiquity and the Early Middle Ages". The World of the Slavs : Studies of the East, West and South Slavs: Civitas, Oppidas, Villas and Archeological Evidence (7th to 11th Centuries AD). Istorijski institut. ISBN 978-8-6774-3104-4.
