= Avlon =

Avlon, Avlona or Avlonas may refer to:

- Avlona, Albania, an English obsolete name of Vlorë, a seaport in Albania, still used in some other languages
- Avlona, Cyprus, a town in Cyprus
- settlements in Greece:
  - Avlonas, Attica, a town in northern Attica
  - Avlon, Euboea, a municipality on Euboea
  - Avlona, Karpathos, a village on the island of Karpathos
  - Avlonas, Messenia, a municipality in Messenia
- John Avlon (born 1973), American journalist and political commentator
