= Galič =

Galič (Greek: Γαλίτζτ, Serbian: Галич) was a medieval fortification (kastron) located in the village of Luka, on a hill on the right side of the Sočanica river into the Ibar, 20 km north of Mitrovicë. It was a military fort that protected the neighbouring roads and mining areas and also served as a refugium. Its name is of Slavic origin, derived from gal-, which is another word for "black, dark". The mining region of Kopaonik–Rogozna includes the Roman-era municipium Dardanorum. The Sokoljača fortification existed at the same time on the other side of the Sočanica. Oral tradition calls Galič "Trojan's city" (Trojanov grad) and Čivutana. There are remains of the medieval fort foundations, and later Ottoman-period trenches. Material from Galič was used to build the Sočanica church.

Serbian archaeologist Đorđe Janković studied Sočanica in 2009 and also visited Galič and Sokoljača. He believed that Galič was a Byzantine fort that was rebuilt by the Serbs with wood, during the Byzantine-Serbian conflict in 1149.

== See also ==
- Stari Ras
- Zvečan Fortress
- Jeleč
- Brvenik

== Sources ==
- Janjić, Dragana (2018). "ГАЛИЧ–СРЕДЊОВЕКОВНО УТВРЂЕЊЕ". Vojnoistorijski glasnik. 2: 9–24.
- Janković, Đorđe (2009). "Галич, Сеченица и Тара". Митолошки зборник. 21: 113–130.
- Mišić, Siniša (2010). Лексикон градова и тргова средњовековних српских земаља: према писаним изворима. Завод за уџбенике. ISBN 978-86-17-16604-3.
