= Theodore Prodromos =

Byzantine writer

- Born: c. 1100
- Died: c. 1165/70; Constantinople, Byzantine Empire
- Education: University of Constantinople
- Known for: Describing smallpox
- Scientific career
- Fields: Logic, medicine
- Academic advisors: Michael Italikos; Stephanos Skylitzes
- Notable students: Theodore Styppeiotes

Theodore Prodromos or Prodromus (Greek: Θεόδωρος Πρόδρομος; c. 1100 – c. 1165/70), probably also the same person as the so-called Ptochoprodromos (Πτωχοπρόδρομος, "Poor Prodromos"), was a Byzantine writer, well known for his prose and poetry.

== Biography ==
Very little is known about his life. Further developing a genre begun by Nicholas Kallikles, he wrote many occasional poems for a widespread circle of patrons at the Byzantine court. Some of the literary pieces attributed to him are unpublished, while still others may be wrongly attributed to him. Even so, there does emerge from these writings the figure of an author in reduced circumstances, with a marked inclination towards begging, who was in close touch with the court circles during the reigns of John II Komnenos (1118–1143) and Manuel I Komnenos (1143–1180). He was given a prebend by Manuel I, and he ended his life as a monk. Despite the panegyric and conventional treatment, his writings, often produced on some public occasion, provide important information on many aspects of contemporary Byzantine history. There is a strongly satirical vein in his works, which range from epigrams and dialogues to letters and occasional pieces in both prose and verse. He had a biting sense of humour, and his comments are shrewd and pithy.

== Works in literary language ==
The literary activity of Theodore Prodromos was vast and versatile, and there survive many of his writings in the literary Byzantine Greek language. Taking example by Heliodorus of Emesa's Aethiopica, he wrote a novel in verse, Rhodanthe and Dosikles (Τὰ κατὰ Ῥοδάνθην καὶ Δοσικλέα) in 9 books. The Battle of Cat and Mice (Κατομυομαχία) is a parody drama of the classical Greek tragedies, with dramatic roles for the mice. The action takes place off stage, and is related in two speeches by the messenger. A deus ex machina saves the mice from the housecat in the end. He also wrote "Iambic and Dactyllic Quatrains on 293 Biblical Verses". The iambic quatrains are in the Vulgar Greek, and the Dactyllic quatrains are in the Homeric Greek. He also wrote two satirical poems, one against a lustful old woman (Κατὰ φιλοπόρνου γραός), and the other against an old bearded man (Κατὰ μακρογενείου γέροντος). There also survives an astrological poem on the power and meaning of planets. The Verses on the Twelve Months (Στίχοι εἰς τοὺς δώδεκα μῆνας) are important for contemporary cultural history. Prodromos also wrote numerous occasional poems and epigrams, often on the occasion of some public event of historical significance, or for the purpose of begging for something; a few religious poems and treatises on the topics of theology, philosophy and grammar; dialogues written in the style of Lucian of Samosata; a hagiography of Saint Meletios the Younger; occasional speeches, epistles and many other writings.

== Ptochoprodromos ==
One collection of four poems, written in the vernacular, has passed down to us under the name of "Ptōchopródromos", however it has still not been established with certainty whether these poems were written by him or by someone who was imitating, or possibly even parodying, the true Theodore Prodromos. An attempt was made at resolving the problem of authorship by putting forward a hypothesis that there had actually been two poets of the same name. The evidence was found in one verse among the Ptochoprodromic writings, where the author praises the "famous writer, harmonious swallow", who was his "friend and predecessor". However, in distinguishing which poems belong to whom of the two poets, one comes across the unsurpassable obstacles. It was also suggested, without much evidence, that one Prodromos died in 1152, and the other in 1166.

The basic part of the Ptochoprodromic writings consists of five laments and begging poems, which are marked as ABCDE. The poem A laments over the poet's garrulous wife and calls for help from emperor John II Komnenos (r. 1118–1143). The poem B is addressed to a sebastokrator and begs for charity to improve the menu. The poem C, addressed to emperor Manuel I Komnenos (r. 1143–1180), relates a young monk's complaint over scandalous living circumstances in his monastery. The poem D is only a parallel of the poem C. The poem E describes a Byzantine writer.

The manuscripts signify that the author of these poems is a Prodromos, Theodore Prodromos etc. with further variations. One manuscript of the monastic satire (C) signifies that the author is Hilarion (Ptocho)prodromos, and this name is found again in the poem D. This name has always been identified with the famous novelist, poet and writer Theodore Prodromos, who wrote in purist Byzantine Greek. The bilingualism is not all that surprising, as it is already found in the writings of Michael Glykas. However, many scholars think that neither the monastic satire (C) nor the satire on the writer (E) can be reconciled with the life of Theodore Prodromos. Others suggest that Hilarion was Theodore's son, ascribing the wrong authorship references in the manuscripts to the later copyists. However, no evidence has been found to support this hypothesis.

== See also ==
- Sophia Antoniadis
- Michael of Thessaloniki (fl. 1149–1156), orator
