= John Kinnamos =

Byzantine historian (c.1143–c.1185)

John Kinnamos or Joannes Kinnamos or John Cinnamus (Greek: Ἰωάννης Κίνναμος or Κίναμος; born shortly after 1143, died after 1185), was a Byzantine historian. He was imperial secretary (Greek "grammatikos", most likely a post connected with the military administration) to Emperor Manuel I (1143–1180), whom he accompanied on his campaigns in Europe and Asia Minor. It appears that Kinnamos outlived Andronikos I, who died in 1185.

Kinnamos was the author of a history that covered the years 1118–1176, thereby continuing the Alexiad of Anna Komnene, and covering the reigns of John II and Manuel I, until Manuel's unsuccessful campaign against the Turks, which ended in defeat at the Battle of Myriokephalon.

Kinnamos's work breaks off abruptly, though it is highly likely that the original continued to the death of Manuel. There are also indications that the present work is an abridgment of a significantly larger work. The hero of the history is Manuel, and throughout the history Kinnamos attempts to highlight what he sees as the superiority of the Byzantine Empire to the Western and other powers. Similarly, he is a determined opponent of what he perceives as the pretensions of the papacy. Nevertheless, he writes with the straightforwardness of a soldier, and occasionally admits his ignorance of certain events. The work is well organized, and its style, modeled on Xenophon, is simple, especially when compared with the florid writing of other Greek authors of the period. William Plate considers him the best of the European historians of this period.

John Kinnamos is also credited for writing a book on one of the Angeli emperors; however, this book is believed to be lost (perhaps together with the rest of his much larger work).

== Bibliography ==
- John Kinnamos, Rerum ab Ioanne et Alexio [sic] Comnenis Gestarum, ed. A. Meineke, Corpus Scriptorum Historiae Byzantinae (Bonn, 1836).
- John Kinnamos, The Deeds of John and Manuel Comnenus, trans. C.M. Brand (New York, 1976) ISBN 0-231-04080-6.
- Jonathan Harris, Byzantium and the Crusades (Hambledon and London, 2003) ISBN 1-85285-298-4.
- J. Ljubarskij, "John Kinnamos as a writer", in Polypleuros Nous: Miscellanea für Peter Schreiner zu seinem 60 Geburtstag (Byzantinisches Archiv, 19), ed. C. Scholz and G. Makris (Munich, 2000), pp. 164–173.
- Paul Magdalino, "Aspects of twelfth-century Byzantine Kaiserkritik", Speculum 58 (1983), 326–346 and reprinted in Paul Magdalino, Tradition and Transformation in Medieval Byzantium (Ashgate publishing, 1991), No. VIII.
- Paul Stephenson, "John Cinnamus, John II Comnenus and the Hungarian campaign of 1127–1129", Byzantion 66 (1996), 177–187.
