= Coloman, King of Hungary =

King of Hungary from 1095 to 1116

Coloman the Learned
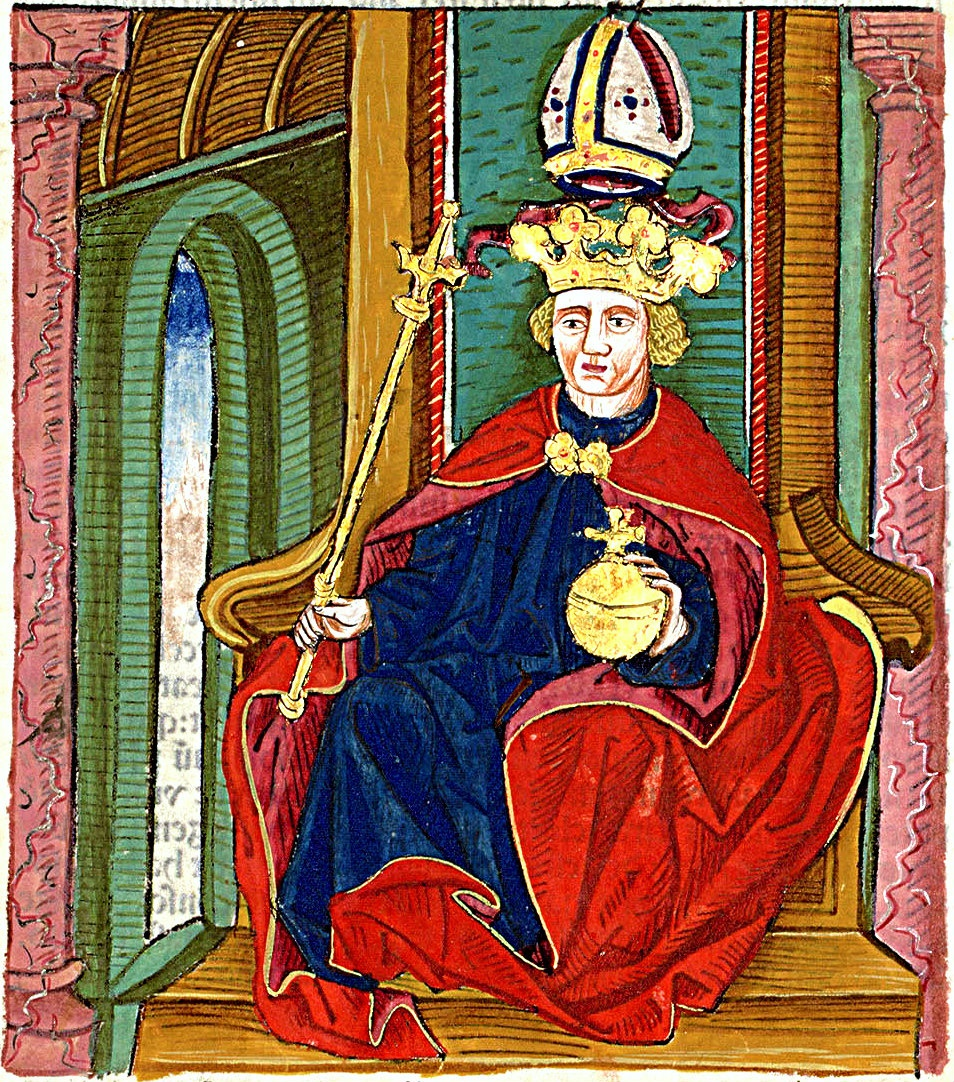
- Coloman depicted in János Thuróczy's Chronicle of the Hungarians

King of Hungary
- Reign: 1096 – 3 February 1116
- Coronation: spring of 1096, Székesfehérvár
- Predecessor: Ladislaus I
- Successor: Stephen II

King of Croatia
- Reign: 1097 – 3 February 1116
- Coronation: 1102, Biograd
- Predecessor: Petar Snačić
- Successor: Stephen II
- Born: c. 1070
- Died: 3 February 1116 (aged 45–46)
- Burial: Székesfehérvár Basilica
- Spouses: Felicia of Sicily; Eufemia of Kiev
- Issue more...: Sophia; Stephen II of Hungary
- Dynasty: Árpád dynasty
- Father: Géza I of Hungary
- Mother: Sophia
- Religion: Roman Catholic

Coloman the Learned, also the Book-Lover or the Bookish (Hungarian: Könyves Kálmán; Croatian: Koloman; Slovak: Koloman Učený; c. 1070 – 3 February 1116), was King of Hungary from 1095 and King of Croatia from 1097 until his death. Because Coloman and his younger brother Álmos were underage when their father Géza I died, their uncle Ladislaus I ascended the throne in 1077. Ladislaus prepared Coloman—who was "half-blind and humpbacked", according to late medieval Hungarian chronicles—for a church career, and Coloman was eventually appointed bishop of Eger or Várad (Oradea, Romania) in the early 1090s. The dying King Ladislaus preferred Álmos to Coloman when nominating his heir in early 1095. Coloman fled from Hungary but returned around 19 July 1095 when his uncle died. He was crowned in early 1096; the circumstances of his accession to the throne are unknown. He granted the Hungarian Duchy—one-third of the Kingdom of Hungary—to Álmos.

In the year of Coloman's coronation, at least five large groups of crusaders arrived in Hungary on their way to the Holy Land. He annihilated the bands who were entering his kingdom unauthorized or pillaging the countryside, but the main crusader army crossed Hungary without incident. He invaded Croatia in 1097, defeating its last native king Petar Snačić. Consequently, he was crowned king of Croatia in 1102. According to the late 14th-century Pacta conventa (the authenticity of which is not universally accepted by scholars), he was only crowned after having ratified a treaty with the leaders of the Croatian nobility. For centuries thereafter, the Hungarian monarchs were also the kings of Croatia.

Coloman had to face his brother's attempts to dethrone him throughout his life; Álmos devised plots to overthrow him on at least five occasions. In retaliation, he seized his brother's duchy in 1107 or 1108 and had Álmos and Álmos' son Béla blinded in about 1114. Hungarian chronicles, which were compiled in the reigns of kings descending from his mutilated brother and nephew, depict Coloman as a bloodthirsty and unfortunate monarch. On the other hand, he is portrayed as "the most well-versed in the science of letters among all the kings of his day" by the contemporaneous chronicler Gallus Anonymus. Coloman's decrees, which governed many aspects of life—including taxation, trade and relations between his Christian and non-Christian subjects—remained unmodified for more than a century. He was the first Hungarian king to renounce control of the appointment of prelates in his realms.

== Early years (c. 1070–1095) ==
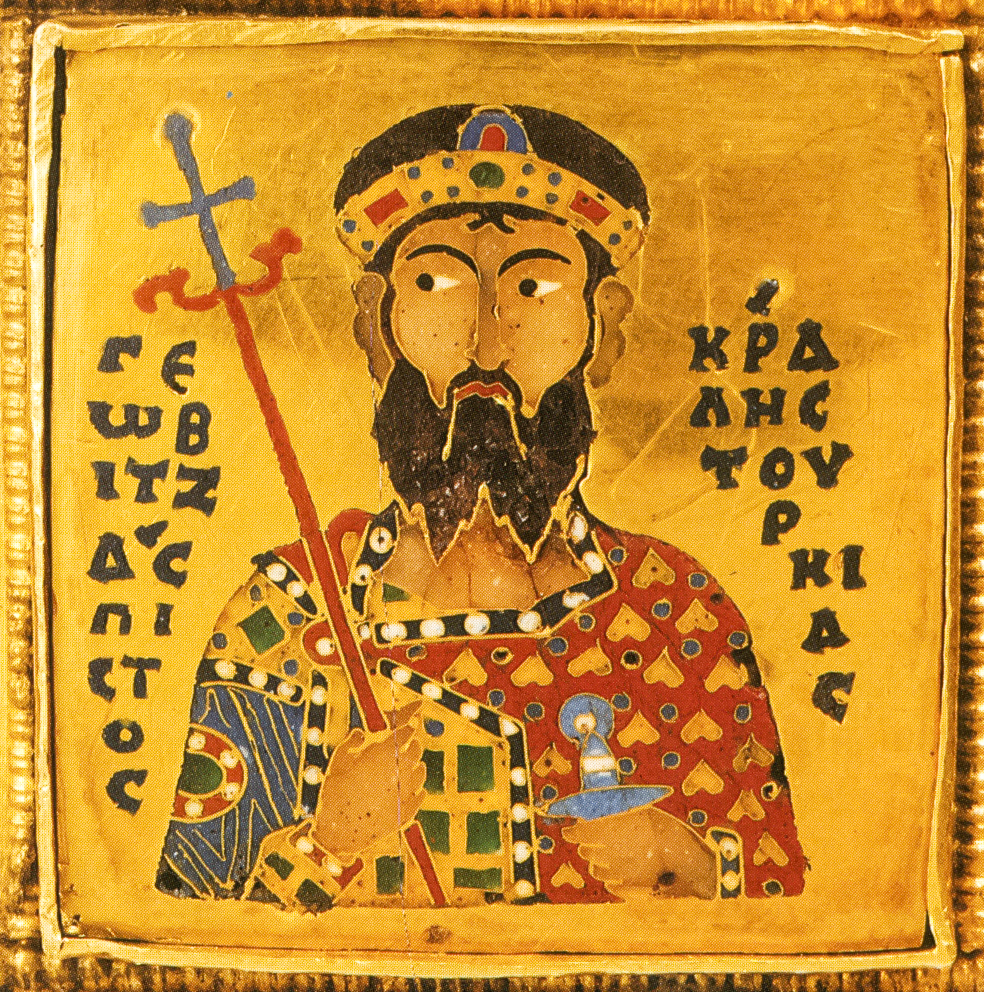
Coloman's father Géza depicted on the lower part (Corona Graeca) of the Holy Crown of Hungary

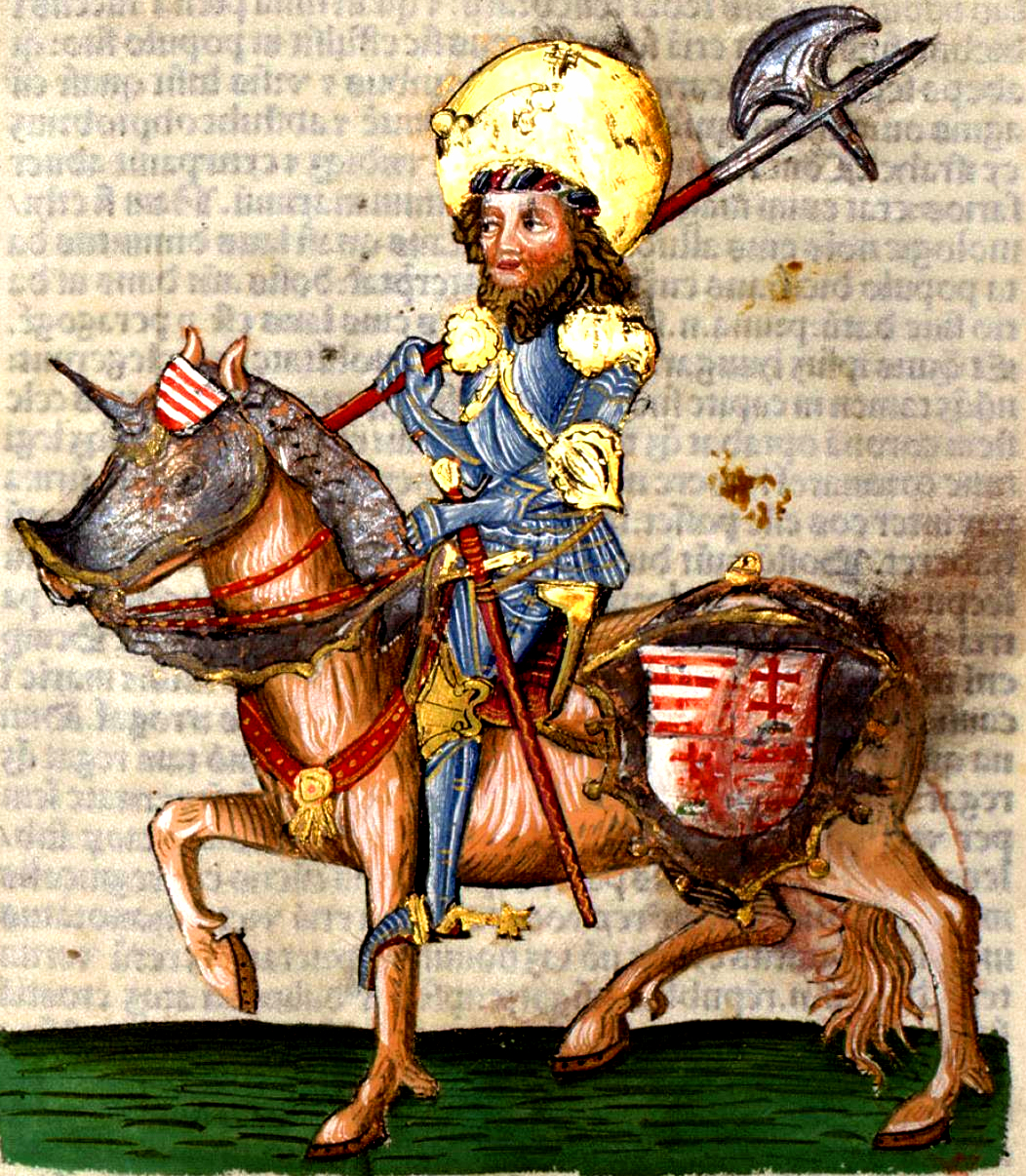
Coloman's uncle Ladislaus depicted in the Chronica Hungarorum

Coloman was the elder of the two sons of King Géza I who survived infancy. Géza's Byzantine second wife, whose baptismal name is unknown, left Hungary after her husband's death, implying that she was not his children's mother. Consequently, the mother of Coloman and his younger brother, Álmos, must have been Géza's first wife, Sophia, whose family is unknown. According to historians Gyula Kristó and Márta Font, the brothers were born around 1070, because they were mature enough to hold offices in the early 1090s. Coloman's uncommon baptismal name was recorded as Colomanus or Colombanus in medieval documents written in Latin. Kristó writes that he was most probably named after Saint Coloman of Stockerau, a missionary who was martyred in Austria in the early 11th century. Another possibility is that his name is of Turkish origin (meaning "rest"), because his brother bore a Turkish name.

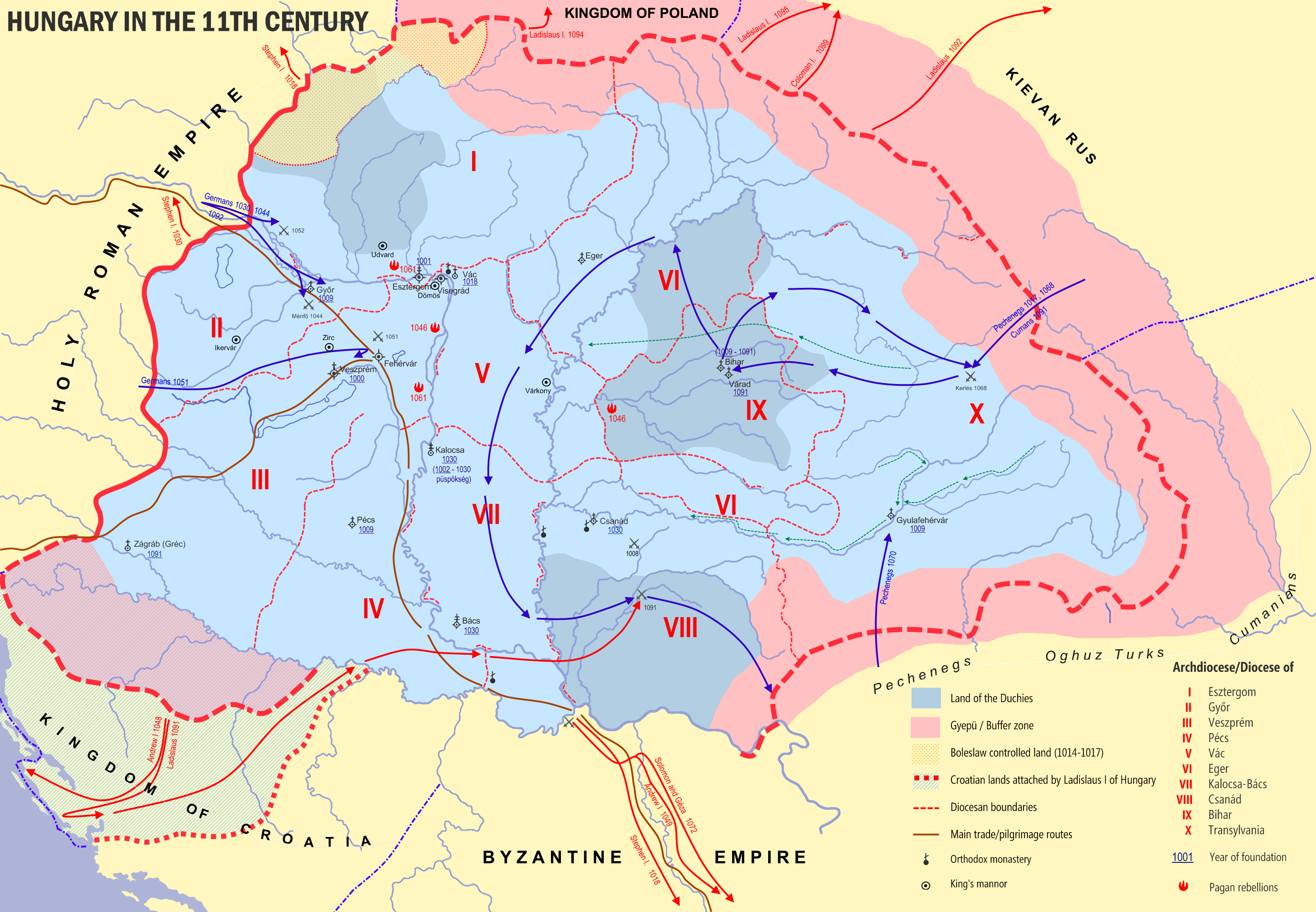
The Kingdom of Hungary in the 1090s

Coloman's father ascended the throne in 1074. Because Coloman and Álmos were minors when he died on 25 April 1077, Géza's brother Ladislaus I succeeded him. The new king decided that Coloman should be prepared for a career in the Church. The king's decision was unusual as Coloman was older than Álmos and elder brothers were rarely ordained priests. The 14th-century Illuminated Chronicle stated that Coloman was "of mean stature, but astute and quick of apprehension", adding that he was "shaggy and hirsute, half-blind and humpbacked, and he walked with a limp and stammered in his speech". If the chronicle preserved genuine tradition of his appearance, his physical deformity may have influenced his uncle's decision. However, modern scholars tend to refute this view, emphasizing that the chronicle was completed in the reigns of kings descending from Álmos.

In preparation for his clerical life, Coloman learnt to read and write and acquired a good knowledge of Latin. His proficiency in canon law was praised in a letter that Pope Urban II addressed to him in 1096. According to Kristó, upon finishing his studies he was ordained priest and in the early 1090s was appointed bishop. Hungarian chronicles completed in the 14th and 15th centuries say that Coloman was bishop of either Eger or Várad. For instance, the Illuminated Chronicle states that he was "bishop of Warad" (or Várad), and Ladislaus I wanted to appoint him "bishop of Agria" (or Eger).

According to the Illuminated Chronicle, both Coloman and Álmos accompanied their uncle on a military campaign against Bohemia in early 1095. Before reaching the border of his kingdom, Ladislaus I "was overcome by a grave infirmity" and decided to appoint Álmos as his heir. Instead of obeying his uncle's decision, Coloman fled to Poland. He returned to Hungary around 29 July 1095 when his uncle died. The exact circumstances of his ascension to the throne are uncertain. The Illuminated Chronicle states Ladislaus had invited him back from Poland. The same source adds that Álmos, "in the true simplicity of his heart honoured his brother, Coloman, and yielded to him the crown of the kingdom", which suggests that he ascended the throne without bloodshed. On the other hand, Coloman was crowned king in early 1096, the delay implying that the two brothers had been fighting for the crown before they reached an agreement. It is also possible, as proposed by Font, that he could only be crowned after Pope Urban II had released him from his clerical vows.

== Reign ==
=== Facing the crusaders (1095–1096) ===
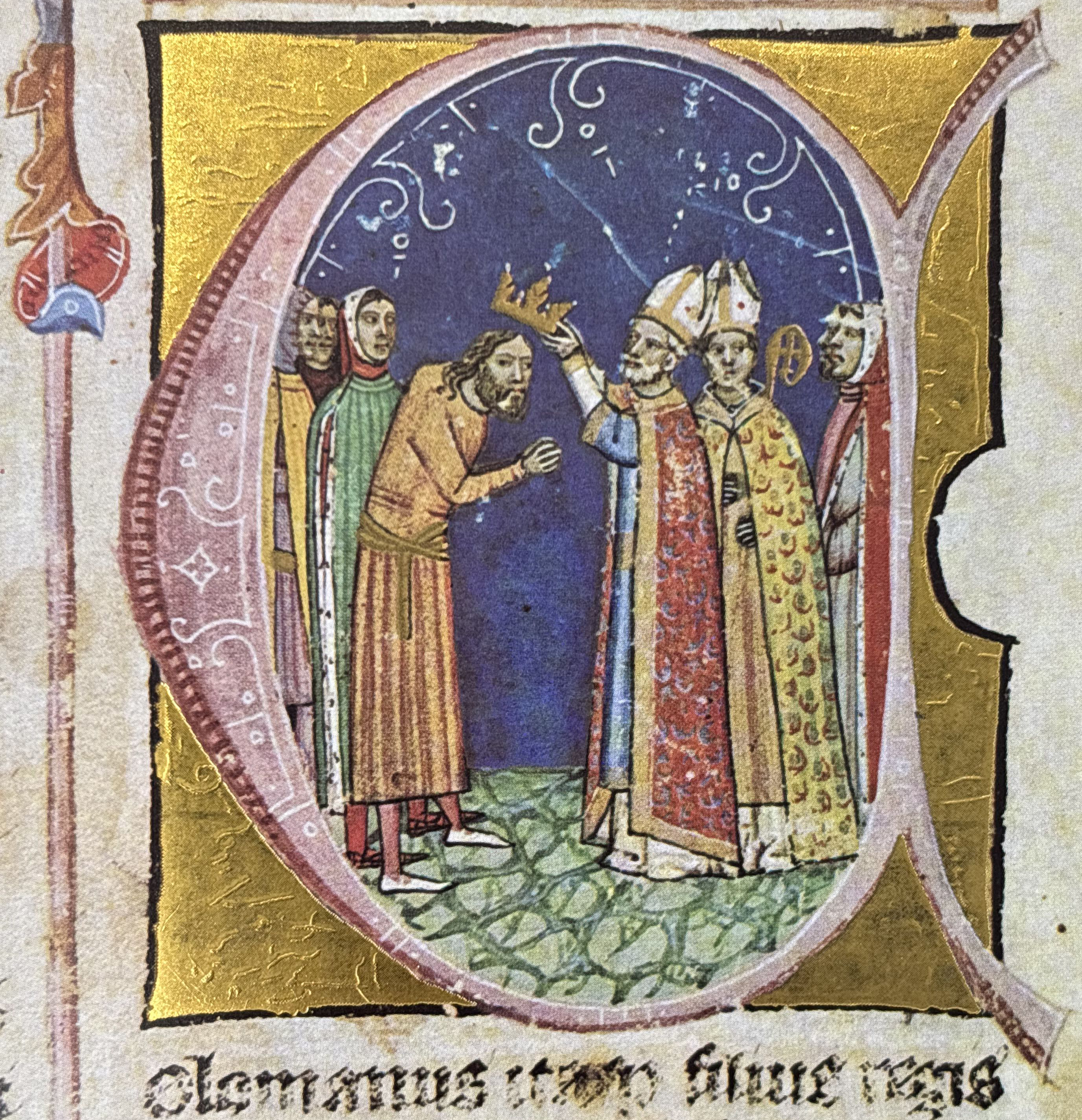
Coloman—who is depicted as a hunchback in accordance with the tradition preserved in late medieval chronicles—is crowned king (from the Illuminated Chronicle).

Coloman was crowned in Székesfehérvár by Archbishop Seraphin of Esztergom. According to the Illuminated Chronicle, at the same time, he "granted the dukedom with full rights" to Álmos. This report shows that Álmos only acknowledged his brother's rule in exchange for receiving the duchy once held by their father and grandfather, an area that comprised one third of the territory of the kingdom.

Shortly after his coronation, Coloman had to face problems that the armies of the First Crusade caused while passing through Hungary. For decades, Hungary had been able to supply a significant number of Western European pilgrims with food during their journey to the Holy Land, but the movement of tens of thousands of crusaders across the country endangered the natives' subsistence. The first group of crusaders, led by Walter Sans Avoir, reached the frontier in early May 1096. Coloman received them in a friendly way and allowed them into the kingdom. He also authorized them to buy food in the markets, although harvest had not started yet. They proceeded through Hungary without any major conflicts. The only incident occurred near the Hungarian–Byzantine border at Zimony (Zemun, Serbia). Here, "certain Hungarians with evil minds" attacked sixteen crusaders who had tried to buy weapons near the town, seizing the crusaders' clothes, armor, and money.

The next arrivals, headed by Peter the Hermit, arrived in late May or early June. Coloman permitted them to enter Hungary only after Peter pledged that he would prevent them from pillaging the countryside. According to Guibert of Nogent's records, Peter could not keep his promise: the crusaders "burned the public granaries ..., raped virgins, dishonored many marriage beds by carrying off many women", although "the Hungarians, as Christians to Christians, had generously offered everything for sale" to them. Peter himself claimed that he and his companions had passed through the country without incident until they reached Zimony, where they learnt of the story of the sixteen crusaders who had been robbed by the Hungarians. The crusaders besieged and took the town, where they massacred "[a]bout four thousand Hungarians", according to the contemporaneous Albert of Aix's estimation. They only withdrew when Coloman's troops approached them.

A third band of crusaders reached Nyitra (Nitra, Slovakia) and began plundering the region. These were soon routed by the locals. A fourth army came to Moson in the middle of June. Coloman did not allow them to leave the region, either because he had learnt of their troublesome behavior during their journey, or he had realized that their movement across Hungary could jeopardize the stability of the local economy. To seize food and wine, the crusaders made frequent pillaging raids against the nearby settlements. Coloman decided to attack them, but the commanders of the army convinced him to persuade the crusaders to surrender their weapons and money, promising them that they would be supplied with food during their journey. After the crusaders were disarmed, Coloman's troops attacked and massacred them near Pannonhalma in early July.

[The crusaders] were even granted a licence to buy and sell necessary supplies, and peace was proclaimed on both sides according to [Coloman's] instructions, lest a dispute might arise from such a large army. But when they were delayed there for some days, they began to wander, and the Bavarians and Swabians, a bold race, and the rest of the soldiers foolishly drank too much; they violated the proclaimed peace, little by little stealing wine, barley, and other necessities from the Hungarians, finally seizing sheep and cattle in the fields and killing them; they destroyed those who stood up to them and wanted to drive them out. The others committed several crimes, all of which we cannot report, like a people foolish in their boorish habits, unruly and wild. For, as those say who were present, they stabbed a certain young Hungarian in the market street with a stake through his private parts, because of a most contemptible dispute. ... [Coloman] was disturbed by this scandal, ... so he ordered ... that the signal should be given to the whole of Hungary to stir to battle in vengeance of this crime and the other insults, and not one of the pilgrims was to be spared because they had carried out this vile deed.

— Albert of Aix: History of the Journey to Jerusalem

Alarmed by these incidents, Coloman forbade the crusaders who arrived under the leadership of Count Emicho in the middle of July to enter Hungary. Ignoring the king's order, they broke through the defensive lines and laid siege to Moson. Their catapults destroyed the walls in two places, enabling them to storm into the fortress on 15 August. Coloman made preparations to flee to Rus', fearing that the crusaders would occupy the whole country. However, for no apparent reason, a panic broke out among the attackers that enabled the garrison to carry out a sortie and rout them. Modern scholars agree that rumours about the sudden arrival of Coloman's army frightened the crusaders off from the fortress. According to Albert of Aix, contemporaneous Christians thought that Emicho's defeat was a punishment that God inflicted on the pilgrims because they had massacred many Jews "rather from greed for their money than for divine justice".

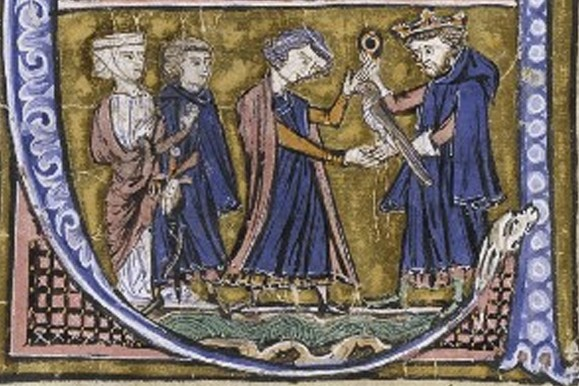
Coloman's meeting with Godfrey of Bouillon

The first crusader army organized by the Holy See reached the borders of Hungary in September 1096. It was led by Godfrey of Bouillon, Duke of Lower Lorraine. Godfrey sent a knight who had already been known to Coloman to start negotiations about the crusaders' entry into Hungary. Eight days later, Coloman agreed to meet with Godfrey in Sopron. The king allowed the crusaders to march through his kingdom but stipulated that Godfrey's younger brother Baldwin and his family should stay with him as hostages. The crusaders passed through Hungary peacefully along the right bank of the Danube; Coloman and his army followed them on the left bank. He only released his hostages after all the crusaders had crossed the river Sava, which marked the kingdom's southern frontier. The uneventful march of the main crusader army across Hungary established Coloman's good reputation throughout Europe.

The contemporaneous Cosmas of Prague wrote that "some of the Jews" who had been persecuted by the crusaders in Bohemia arrived in Hungary and "secretly took their wealth away with them". Although Cosmas does not specify their number, László Mezey and other historians say that the Jews represented a large influx. Coloman issued a number of decrees and separate statutes—Capitula de Iudeis—regulating the position of Jews in Hungary. For instance, he forbade them from holding Christian slaves and residing "outside episcopal sees". Historian Nora Berend writes that the "defence of purity of Christians by interdictions against mingling with Jews plays a very minor role" in Coloman's legislation in comparison with late 12th-century canon law. Whereas he did not try to convert the Jews, he issued decrees aimed at the conversion of his Muslim subjects. For instance, he prescribed that if a Muslim "has a guest, or anyone invited to dinner, both he and his table companions shall eat only pork for meat" in order to prevent Muslims from observing their dietary laws.

=== Expansion, internal conflicts and legislation (1096–1105) ===
After Coloman's victories over the crusaders, Henry IV, Holy Roman Emperor, whom Ladislaus I had supported against Pope Urban II in his last years, wrote a letter to Duke Álmos. The emperor stated that Coloman had neglected imperial interests "because of his own necessities", and asked the duke to intervene on his behalf. However, Coloman—a former bishop—abandoned his predecessor's foreign policy and supported the pope. Historian Gyula Kristó writes that Álmos's close relationship with Emperor Henry may also have influenced Coloman's decision. Coloman married Felicia, a daughter of Roger I of Sicily—a close ally of the Holy See—in 1097. Her sister Constance had married Conrad, the elder son of Emperor Henry IV, after he allied with the pope against his father.

Coloman invaded Croatia in 1097. Ladislaus I had already occupied most of the country, but Petar Snačić, the last native king of Croatia, resisted him in the Mala Kapela mountains. Petar Snačić died fighting against Coloman's army in the Battle of Gvozd Mountain. The Hungarian troops reached the Adriatic Sea and occupied Biograd na Moru, an important port. Threatened by the advance of Coloman's army, the citizens of the towns of Trogir and Split swore fidelity to the doge of Venice, Vitale Michiel, who had sailed to Dalmatia. Having no fleet, Coloman sent envoys with a letter to the doge to "remove all the former misunderstandings concerning what is due to one of us or the other by right of our predecessors". Their agreement of 1098—the so-called Conventio Amicitiae—determined the spheres of interest of each party by allotting the coastal regions of Croatia to Hungary and Dalmatia to the Republic of Venice.

Taking advantage of Coloman's absence, Álmos began to conspire against the king and mustered his armies. Coloman returned from Croatia and marched his army towards his brother's duchy in 1098. The two armies met at Tiszavárkony, with only the river Tisza separating them. However, the commanders of the two troops started negotiations and decided not to fight each other, compelling the king and the duke to make peace.

[Coloman] and his army marched to [Tiszavárkony] against [Álmos], and [Álmos] drew near to [Tiszavárkony] from the opposite direction, and between them was the river [Tisza]. But loyal Hungarians sought to bring about a truce, in order that they could talk with each other, and they said: "Why do we fight? If they defeat us in battle, we shall die; and if they escape, they will flee: in times past our fathers fought against each other and brothers against brothers, and they died. Nor do we see any ground for fighting. Let those two fight if fighting pleases them; and whichever of them shall win, let us take as lord." Having taken this decision, the chief men dispersed. When Grak told [Coloman] of their decision and Ilia informed [Álmos], they kept the peace, though it was not by their own will.

— The Hungarian Illuminated Chronicle

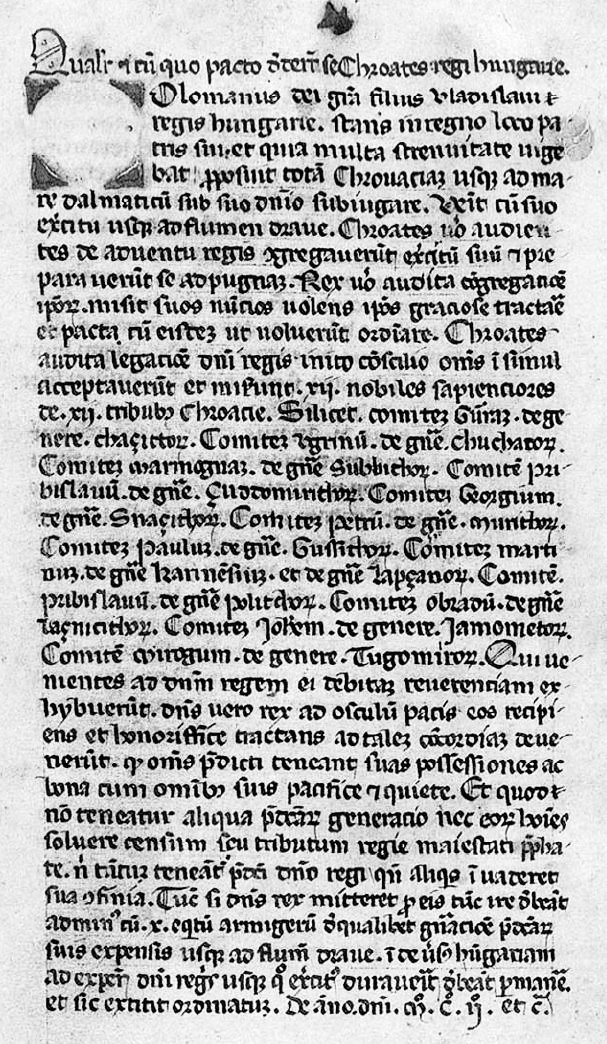
The 14th-century manuscript of the Pacta conventa

Grand Prince Svyatopolk II of Kiev sent his son Iaroslav – who was the husband of one of Coloman's nieces – to Hungary to seek assistance against the princes of the westernmost regions of Rus' in 1099. Iaroslav persuaded Coloman to intervene in the conflict. Coloman and his army crossed the Carpathian Mountains and laid siege to Peremyshl (Przemyśl, Poland)—the seat of Volodar Rostislavich, one of the rebellious princes. David Igorevich, one of Volodar Rostislavich's allies, persuaded the Cumans to attack the Hungarians. In the ensuing battle, the Hungarian army was soundly defeated. The Illuminated Chronicle says that "[r]arely did Hungarians suffer such slaughter as in this battle". According to the Russian Primary Chronicle, many Hungarians "were drowned, some in the Vyagro and others in the San", after the battle. Coloman himself narrowly escaped from the battlefield through the valley of the San. Shortly after his return from Rus', Coloman hastened towards the Bohemian border to assist the dukes of Moravia—Svatopluk and Otto—against Duke Bretislaus II of Bohemia. He had a meeting with Bretislaus on the border river Olšava "in the field of Lučsko" where "they renewed their age-old bonds of friendship and peace and confirmed them with oaths", according to Cosmas of Prague.

Coloman decided to review his predecessors' decrees around 1100. Because he regarded Stephen I of Hungary, who had been canonized in 1083, as his ideal, he "assembled the magnates of the kingdom and reviewed with the advice of the entire council the text of the laws" of Stephen I. The assembly also passed decrees, which regulated several aspects of the economy and tempered the harshness of the legislation of Ladislaus I. One of the decrees prohibited the persecution of strigae—vampires or mares—because they "do not exist". The same law also dealt with malefici or "sorcerers", punishing their misdeeds. Taxes on trade were increased under Coloman, implying that commerce flourished in his reign. However, his legislation prohibited the export of Hungarian slaves and horses. Coins minted during his reign were smaller than those issued in his predecessor's reign to prevent the cutting down of their smooth edge.

Coloman was crowned king of Croatia in Biograd na Moru in 1102. In the 13th century, Thomas the Archdeacon wrote that the union of Croatia and Hungary was the consequence of conquest. However, the late 14th-century Pacta conventa narrates that he was only crowned after he had reached an agreement with twelve leading Croatian noblemen, because the Croats were preparing to defend their kingdom against him by force. Whether this document is a forgery or an authentic source is a subject of scholarly debate. According to the historian Pál Engel, even if the document is a forgery, its content "is concordant with reality in more than one respect" concerning the special status of Croatia throughout the Middle Ages. For instance, in case of a foreign invasion, Croatian noblemen were obliged to fight at their own expense only up to the river Drava, which was considered the border between Croatian territories and Hungary.

Coloman was a man of warlike spirit, and resolved to subjugate to his lordship all the land to the Adriatic Sea. He came with a force of arms and took possession of the remaining part of Slavonia, which Ladislas had passed over.

— Thomas the Archdeacon: History of the Bishops of Salona and Split

In an attempt to prevent an alliance between Coloman and Bohemond I of Antioch, the Byzantine Emperor Alexios I Komnenos arranged a marriage between his son and heir, John, and Coloman's cousin, Piroska, in 1104 or 1105. The alliance with the Byzantine Empire also enabled Coloman to invade Dalmatia in 1105. According to the Life of the blessed John of Trogir, he personally commanded his troops besieging Zadar, the most influential among the Dalmatian towns. The siege lasted until Bishop John of Trogir negotiated a treaty between Coloman and the citizens who accepted the king's suzerainty. The town of Split likewise surrendered after a short siege, but two other Dalmatian towns—Trogir and Šibenik—capitulated without resistance. The Life of St Christopher the Martyr also says that a Hungarian fleet subjugated the islands of the Gulf of Kvarner, including Cres, Krk, and Rab, as well as Brač. Thomas the Archdeacon narrates that Coloman granted each Dalmatian town its own "charter of liberties" to secure their loyalty. These liberties included the citizens' right to freely elect the bishop of their town and their exemption from any tribute payable to the monarch. Following his conquest of Dalmatia, Coloman assumed a new title—"King of Hungary, Croatia and Dalmatia"—which was first recorded in 1108.

=== Family affairs (1105–1113) ===
Coloman had his four-year-old son Stephen crowned in 1105, which caused Álmos to openly rebel against the king. The duke left Hungary and sought the assistance of Emperor Henry IV. Having realized that the emperor, who was facing a rebellion led by his own son, could not help him, Álmos returned to Hungary in 1106, but then fled to his brother-in-law, Boleslaw III of Poland. With Polish assistance he captured the fortress of Abaújvár in Hungary. Coloman had a meeting with Boleslaw III, and the two monarchs "vowed perpetual friendship and brotherhood". Without the Polish monarch's support, Álmos was forced to yield to Coloman.

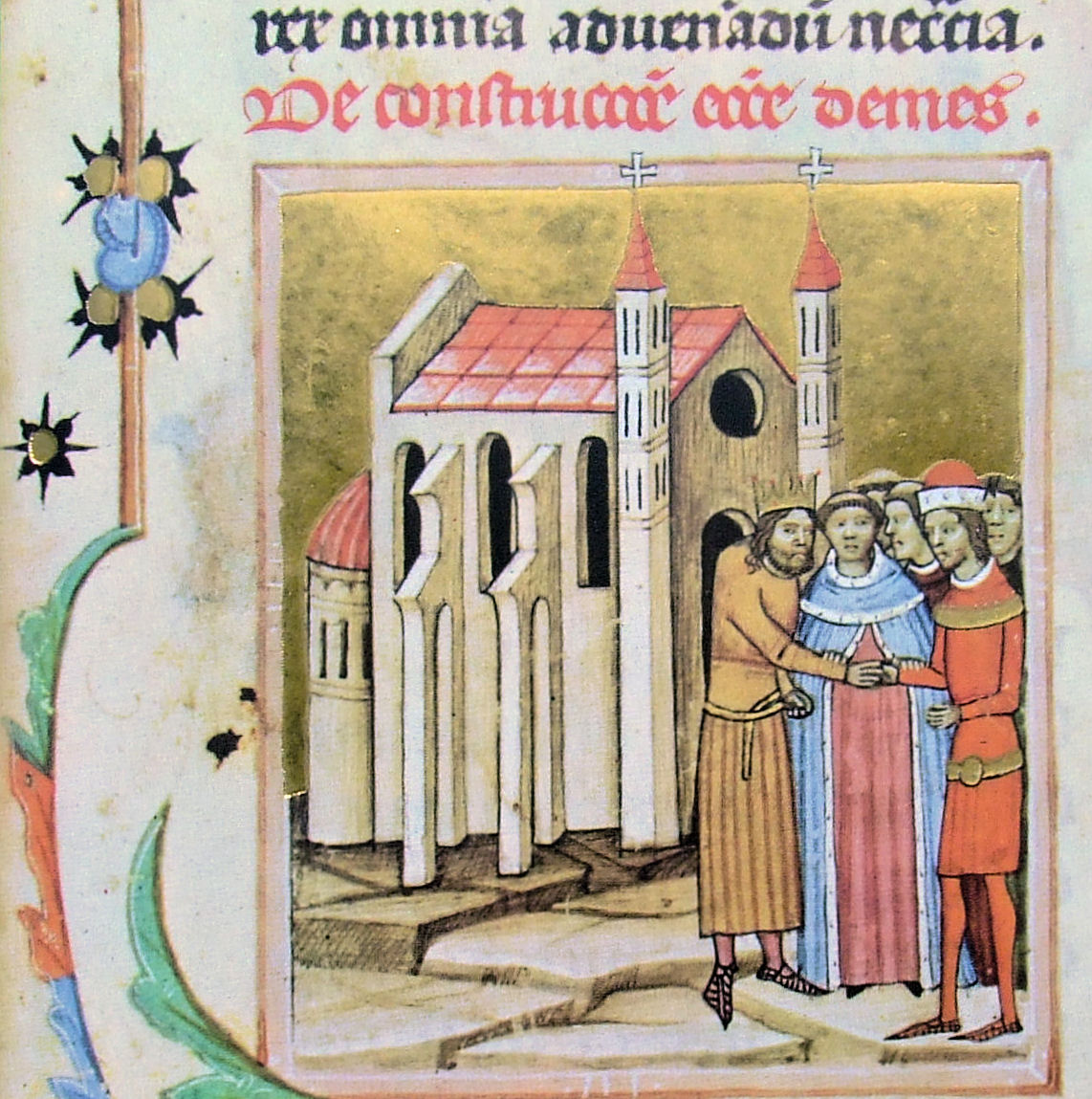
The reconciliation between Coloman and his brother Álmos at the consecration of the monastery of Dömös (from the Illuminated Chronicle)

Coloman sent envoys to the Council of Guastalla, which had been convoked by Pope Paschal II. In October 1106 the envoys solemnly informed the pope of their king's renunciation of his royal prerogative to appoint the prelates of his realms. According to historians Ferenc Makk and Márta Font, without this declaration the Holy See would not have acknowledged Coloman's conquest of Dalmatia. During the civil war between Boleslaw III and his brother Zbigniew, Coloman intervened on the former's behalf and helped him overcome the latter's army in Mazovia in 1107. Coloman also sent Hungarian reinforcements to the Byzantine Emperor Alexios I Komnenos against Bohemond I of Antioch, who had invaded Byzantine territories in October 1107. After suffering a sound defeat, Bohemond withdrew his troops and acknowledged the emperor's suzerainty over the Principality of Antioch in the Treaty of Devol in 1108.

In 1107 or 1108, Álmos made a pilgrimage to the Holy Land. Coloman decided to take advantage of his absence and seized his duchy. Although Álmos was allowed to keep his own private property, the annexation of his duchy secured Coloman's authority in the whole kingdom. After returning from the Holy Land, Álmos set up a monastery at Dömös. On the occasion of its consecration, at which Coloman was also present, Álmos was—falsely, according to the Illuminated Chronicle—accused of trying to assassinate the monarch. Coloman had his brother arrested, but "the most reverend bishops and other well-disposed dignitaries" intervened on Álmos's behalf and "thus reconciliation was solemnly sworn" between the king and his brother.

Álmos left for Passau to meet Henry V of Germany. Upon Álmos's request, Henry V invaded Hungary and laid siege to Pressburg (Bratislava, Slovakia) in September 1108. At the same time, Duke Svatopluk of Bohemia, who also supported Álmos, made an incursion into the regions north of the Danube. Coloman's ally Boleslaw III invaded Bohemia, forcing the Czech duke to withdraw. The emperor's attempt to take Pressburg was a total failure, but he persuaded Coloman to forgive Álmos, who was allowed to return to Hungary.

In the same year, Coloman visited Dalmatia and confirmed the privileges of Split, Trogir, and Zadar. He returned to Zadar around 1111 and reaffirmed the Dalmatian towns' liberties. The Zobor Abbey received two charters of grant from Coloman in 1111 and 1113. The first diploma mentioned a provost in Nyitra (Nitra, Slovakia), but the second charter referred to the bishop of the same town. According to a scholarly theory, the two documents show that Coloman set up the bishopric at Nyitra between 1111 and 1113. These two royal charters also mention a Mercurius as "princeps Ultrasilvanus", which implies he was the first voivode of Transylvania, but he may have been only an important landowner in the province without holding any specific office. In 1112 Coloman made an incursion into Austria. He either wanted to take revenge for Leopold III of Austria's participation in the 1108 German campaign against Hungary, or simply to seize booty.

In 1112 Coloman—who had been widowed—married Euphemia of Kiev, a daughter of Vladimir Monomakh, Prince of Pereyaslavl, in 1112. However, as the Illuminated Chronicle narrated, the queen "was taken in the sin of adultery" in 1113 or 1114. Coloman soon disowned his wife, sending her back to her father.

=== Last years (1113–1116) ===
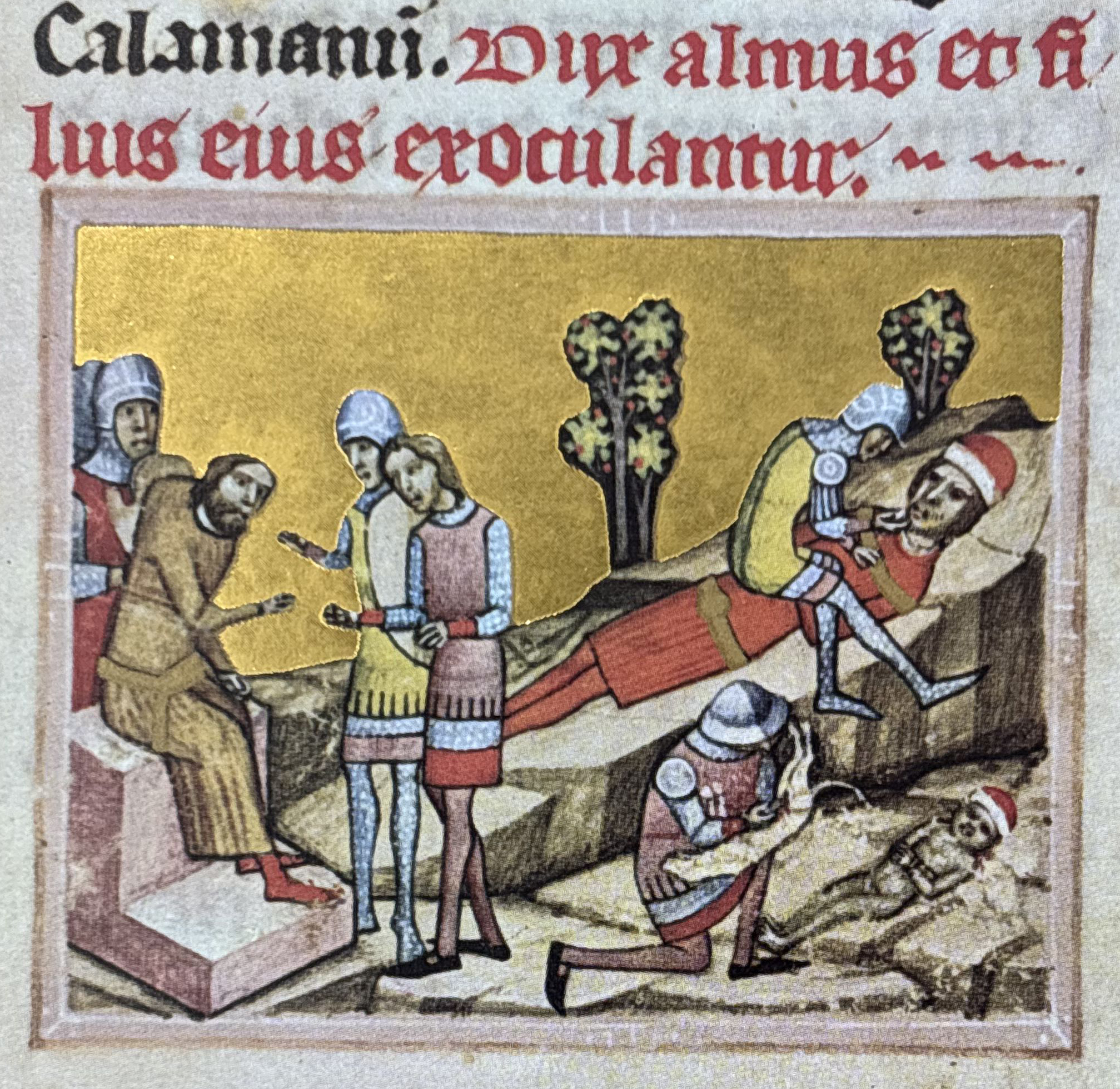
Álmos and his son, Béla are blinded on Coloman's order (from the Illuminated Chronicle).

In 1113 Duke Boleslaw III of Poland, who had blinded his rebellious brother Zbigniew, causing his death, "undertook a journey of pilgrimage to St. Gilles and St. Stephen the King", to the Somogyvár Abbey, and to the king's shrine at Székesfehérvár in Hungary. Coloman received the Polish monarch cordially in Somogyvár. Shortly afterwards—between 1113 and 1115—Coloman discovered that Álmos was again conspiring to seize the throne. Having lost his patience, the king had Álmos and Álmos's young son Béla blinded to secure a peaceful succession for his own son. On the same occasion, many of his brother's partisans were likewise mutilated. According to one of the two versions of these events recorded in the Illuminated Chronicle, the king even ordered that Béla should be castrated but the soldier who was charged with this task refused to execute the order. The chronicle also states that the child was believed to have died after his blinding, but he was actually kept in a monastery for more than a decade.

[The] King took the Duke and his infant son Bela and blinded them. He also gave orders that the infant Bela should be castrated. But the man who was instructed to blind them feared God and the sterility of the royal line, and therefore he castrated a dog and brought its testicles to the King.

— The Hungarian Illuminated Chronicle

The fleet of Venice, commanded by Doge Ordelafo Faliero, invaded Dalmatia in August 1115. The Venetians occupied the Dalmatian islands and some of the coastal cities but could not take Zadar and Biograd na Moru. By that time, Coloman was gravely ill. The symptoms recorded in the Illuminated Chronicle indicate a serious otitis, which caused encephalitis. Before his death, he "instructed his son and his great men that after his death they should take vengeance on Russia for the injury done to him" during his campaign of 1099. Upon his councillor's advice, he also had Álmos, who had taken refuge in the monastery of Dömös, imprisoned.

The King now began to be gravely ill, and he had a Latin doctor, named Draco, in whom he placed too much trust. This doctor applied a poultice to the ears of the King, who was oppressed by headaches, and the strength of the poultice drew out through the cavities of his ears no small part of his brain. When the poultice had been removed because he could endure it no longer, he showed it to Count Othmar. When he inspected it and saw upon it the matter drawn forth from the brain, he said to the King: "Lord, it behoves you to prepare yourself for extreme unction". When the King heard this, he groaned and was afraid.

— The Hungarian Illuminated Chronicle

Coloman died on 3 February 1116. According to the Illuminated Chronicle, "divine vengeance made him drink the bitterness of early death" because of his "shedding of innocent blood" when ordering the punishment of Álmos, Béla, and their partisans. He was the first monarch to be buried near the shrine of Stephen I in the Székesfehérvár Cathedral.

== Family ==
Ancestors of Coloman of Hungary

16. Michael
8. Vazul
4. Béla I of Hungary
9. A lady of the Tátony clan
2. Géza I of Hungary
20. Boleslav I of Poland
10. Mieszko II Lambert of Poland
21. Emnilda
5. Richeza or Adelaide of Poland
22. Ezzo of Lotharingia
11. Richeza of Lotharingia
23. Matilda of Germany
1. Coloman of Hungary
3. Sophia

Coloman's first wife Felicia—who is incorrectly named Busilla in earlier historiography—was the daughter of Count Roger I of Sicily. There is scholarly uncertainty whether her mother was the count's first wife Judith of Évreux or his second wife Eremburga of Mortain. The marriage of Coloman and Felicia took place in the spring of 1097. She gave birth to at least three children. According to Font, the eldest child Sophia was born in or before 1100. In 1101 Sophia was followed by twin brothers Stephen and Ladislaus. Felicia's death preceded that of Ladislaus, who died in 1112.

Coloman married his second wife Eufemia of Kiev in the summer of 1112. Born in 1096 or 1097, she was at least 25 years younger than Coloman. She was the daughter of Vladimir II Monomakh, who was Prince of Pereyaslavl at the time of her marriage. After Coloman repudiated her on a charge of adultery, Eufemia fled to Kiev, where she gave birth to a son, Boris, who was never regarded as Coloman's son by his Hungarian relatives.

The following family tree presents Coloman's ancestors and some of his relatives who are mentioned in the article.

Béla I | Richeza or Adelaide
Sophia* | Géza I | unnamed Synadene* | Ladislaus I
Felicia of Sicily | Coloman | Eufemia of Kiev | Álmos | Piroska | John II Komnenos
Sophia | Stephen II | Ladislaus | Kings of Hungary (from 1131)
Saul

*Whether Géza's first or second wife was his children's mother is uncertain.

== Legacy ==
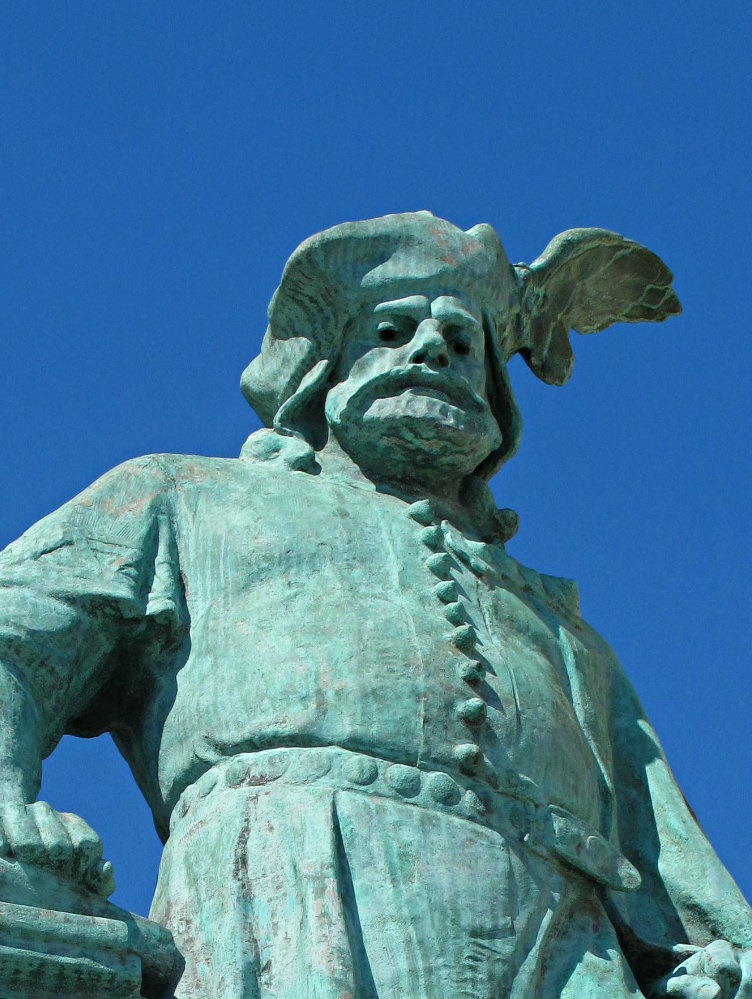
Coloman's statue (Heroes' Square, Budapest, Hungary)

Late medieval Hungarian chronicles, written under kings descended from Álmos, preserved an unfavorable image of Coloman and his rule. According to the Illuminated Chronicle, many "evil things were done" in Coloman's reign. It states that the saintly Ladislaus I predicted that Coloman "would shed blood". Modern historians—including Font, László Kontler, and Kristó—agree that this negative view was a form of "revenge" by his brother's descendants, who persuaded their chroniclers to emphasize Coloman's failures and to hide his successes. Earlier sources show that he was not always regarded as an evil and unlucky monarch. In 1105 the abbess of a nunnery in Zadar stated that Coloman had restored the "peace of the land and the sea". The 13th-century Roger of Torre Maggiore writes that he was "inscribed in the catalogue of saints" along with the members of the Árpád dynasty who were actually canonized. Coloman's decrees, which moderated the severity of Ladislaus I's laws, also contradict the chroniclers' reports of his bloodthirsty nature. The preamble to his decrees described him as "the most Christian King Columban", who is "endowed with the artless grace of a dove and with all discernment of the virtues".

Coloman's statesmanship is appreciated in modern historiography. According to Kontler, "it was ... under Coloman's reign that the medieval Hungarian state became consummate and acquired its final structure". Font and Kristó write that Coloman's laws governed his kingdom without modifications for more than a century, even under monarchs hostile towards his memory. Likewise, coinage in Hungary followed the pattern established by Coloman's small denars throughout the 12th century.

His contemporaries Pope Urban II and Gallus Anonymus were aware of Coloman's "uncommon erudition". According to the chronicles, the Hungarians called him Cunues or Qunwes—the Learned or the Book-Lover—"because of the books he owned". The Illuminated Chronicle says that Coloman "read the canonical hours like a bishop" in his books. According to Kristó, Coloman's court was a center of learning and literature. Bishop Hartvik compiled his Life of King Stephen of Hungary under Coloman. Kristó writes that it is probable that the Lesser Legend of Saint Gerard of Csanád (Cenad, Romania) was also written during Coloman's reign. Historians also attribute the first compilation of Hungarian historical records to his efforts.

== Sources ==
=== Primary sources ===
- Albert of Aachen: Historia Ierosolimitana—History of the Journey to Jerusalem (Edited and translated by Susan B. Edgington) (2007). Oxford University Press. ISBN 978-0-19-920486-1.
- Anna Comnena: The Alexiad (Translated by E. R. A. Sewter) (1969). Penguin Books. ISBN 978-0-14-044958-7.
- Archdeacon Thomas of Split: History of the Bishops of Salona and Split (Latin text by Olga Perić; edited, translated and annotated by Damir Karbić, Mirjana Matijević Sokol, and James Ross Sweeney) (2006). CEU Press. ISBN 963-7326-59-6.
- Cosmas of Prague: The Chronicle of the Czechs (Translated with an introduction and notes by Lisa Wolverton) (2009). The Catholic University of America Press. ISBN 978-0-8132-1570-9.
- Master Roger's Epistle to the Sorrowful Lament upon the Destruction of the Kingdom of Hungary by the Tatars (Translated and Annotated by János M. Bak and Martyn Rady) (2010). In: Rady, Martyn; Veszprémy, László; Bak, János M. (2010); Anonymus and Master Roger; CEU Press; ISBN 978-963-9776-95-1.
- Simon of Kéza: The Deeds of the Hungarians (Edited and translated by László Veszprémy and Frank Schaer with a study by Jenő Szűcs) (1999). CEU Press. ISBN 963-9116-31-9.
- The Deeds of God through the Franks—Gesta Dei per Francos, Guibert de Nogent (Translated by Robert Levine) (1997). The Boydell Press. ISBN 978-0-85115-693-4.
- The Deeds of the Princes of the Poles (Translated and annotated by Paul W. Knoll and Frank Schaer with a preface by Thomas N. Bisson) (2003). CEU Press. ISBN 963-9241-40-7.
- The Hungarian Illuminated Chronicle: Chronica de Gestis Hungarorum (Edited by Dezső Dercsényi) (1970). Corvina, Taplinger Publishing. ISBN 0-8008-4015-1.
- "The Laws of King Coloman (1095–1116)". In The Laws of the Medieval Kingdom of Hungary, 1000–1301 (Translated and Edited by János M. Bak, György Bónis, James Ross Sweeney with an essay on previous editions by Andor Czizmadia, Second revised edition, In collaboration with Leslie S. Domonkos) (1999). Charles Schlacks Jr. Publishers. pp. 23–31. ISBN 1-884445-29-2. OCLC 495379882. OCLC 248424393. LCCN 89-10492. OL 12153527M. (ISBN may be misprinted in the book as 88445–29–2).
- "The letters of Henry IV: Henry thanks Duke Almus for his support and promises him a reward" (2000). In Imperial Lives & Letters of the Eleventh Century (Translated by Theodor E. Mommsen and Karl F. Morrison, with a historical introduction and new suggested readings by Karl F. Morrison, edited by Robert L. Benson). Columbia University Press. pp. 52–100. ISBN 978-0-231-12121-7.
- The Russian Primary Chronicle: Laurentian Text (Translated and edited by Samuel Hazzard Cross and Olgerd P. Sherbowitz-Wetzor) (1953). Medieval Academy of America. ISBN 978-0-915651-32-0.

=== Secondary sources ===
- Bartl, Július; Čičaj, Viliam; Kohútova, Mária; Letz, Róbert; Segeš, Vladimír; Škvarna, Dušan (2002). Slovak History: Chronology & Lexicon. Bolchazy-Carducci Publishers, Slovenské Pedegogické Nakladatel'stvo. ISBN 0-86516-444-4.
- Berend, Nora (2001). At the Gate of Christendom: Jews, Muslims and 'Pagans' in Medieval Hungary, c. 1000–c. 1300. Cambridge University Press. ISBN 978-0-521-02720-5.
- Curta, Florin (2006). Southeastern Europe in the Middle Ages, 500–1250. Cambridge University Press. ISBN 978-0-521-89452-4.
- Engel, Pál (1994). "Přemysl [The Přemyslids]". In Kristó, Gyula; Engel, Pál; Makk, Ferenc (eds.). Korai magyar történeti lexikon (9–14. század) [Encyclopedia of the Early Hungarian History (9th–14th centuries)] (in Hungarian). Akadémiai Kiadó. pp. 559–561. ISBN 963-05-6722-9.
- Engel, Pál (2001). The Realm of St Stephen: A History of Medieval Hungary, 895–1526. I.B. Tauris Publishers. ISBN 1-86064-061-3.
- Érszegi, Géza; Solymosi, László (1981). "Az Árpádok királysága, 1000–1301 [The Monarchy of the Árpáds, 1000–1301]". In Solymosi, László (ed.). Magyarország történeti kronológiája, I: a kezdetektől 1526-ig [Historical Chronology of Hungary, Volume I: From the Beginning to 1526] (in Hungarian). Akadémiai Kiadó. pp. 79–187. ISBN 963-05-2661-1.
- Fine, John V. A. Jr. (1991) [1983]. The Early Medieval Balkans: A Critical Survey from the Sixth to the Late Twelfth Century. Ann Arbor: University of Michigan Press. ISBN 0-472-08149-7.
- Font, Márta (2001). Koloman the Learned, King of Hungary (Supervised by Gyula Kristó, Translated by Monika Miklán). Márta Font (supported by the Publication Commission of the Faculty of Humanities of the University of Pécs). ISBN 963-482-521-4.
- Klaniczay, Gábor (2002). Holy Rulers and Blessed Princes: Dynastic Cults in Medieval Central Europe. Cambridge University Press. ISBN 0-521-42018-0.
- Kontler, László (1999). Millennium in Central Europe: A History of Hungary. Atlantisz Publishing House. ISBN 963-9165-37-9.
- Kristó, Gyula; Makk, Ferenc (1996). Az Árpád-ház uralkodói [Rulers of the House of Árpád] (in Hungarian). I.P.C. Könyvek. ISBN 963-7930-97-3.
- Magaš, Branka (2007). Croatia Through History. SAQI. ISBN 978-0-86356-775-9.
- Makk, Ferenc (1989). The Árpáds and the Comneni: Political Relations between Hungary and Byzantium in the 12th century (Translated by György Novák). Akadémiai Kiadó. ISBN 963-05-5268-X.
- Manteuffel, Tadeusz (1982). The Formation of the Polish State: The Period of Ducal Rule, 963–1194 (Translated and with an Introduction by Andrew Gorski). Wayne State University Press. ISBN 0-8143-1682-4.
- Norwich, John Julius (1992). The Normans in Sicily. Penguin Books. ISBN 978-0-14-015212-8.
- Rubenstein, Jay (2011). Armies of Heaven: The First Crusade and the Quest for Apocalypse. Basic Books. ISBN 978-0-465-01929-8.
- Runciman, Steven (2 February 1975) [1951]. A history of the Crusades. Cambridge: Cambridge University Press. ISBN 0-521-06161-X.
- Stephenson, Paul (2000). Byzantium's Balkan Frontier: A Political Study of the Northern Balkans, 900–1204. Cambridge University Press. ISBN 978-0-521-02756-4.
- Tyerman, Christopher (2006). God's War: A New History of the Crusades. The Belknap Press of Harvard University Press. ISBN 978-0-674-02387-1.
- Wiszewski, Przemysław (2010). Domus Bolezlai: Values and Social Identity in Dynastic Traditions of Medieval Poland (c. 966–1138). Brill. ISBN 978-90-04-18142-7.

Coloman, King of Hungary House of Árpád Born: c. 1070 Died: 3 February 1116
Regnal titles
| Preceded by Ladislaus I | King of Hungary; 1095–1116 | Succeeded by Stephen II |
| Preceded by Petar Snačić | King of Croatia; 1097–1116 | Succeeded by Stephen II |
