= Battle of Haram =

Battle 1120s in Europe

- Part of Byzantine–Hungarian War (1127–29)
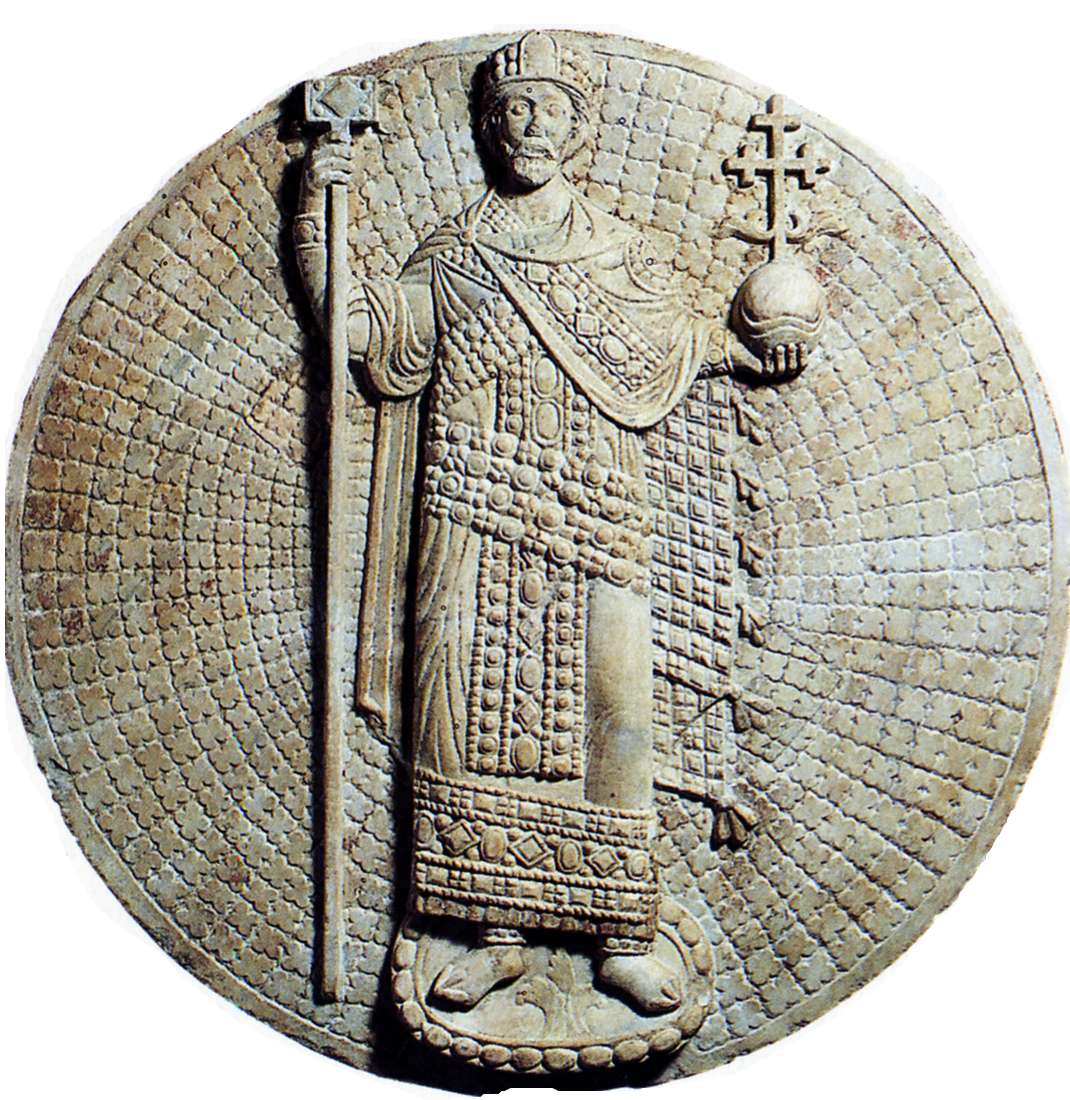
- Emperor John II Komnenos (r. 1118–1143), commander of the Byzantine forces in the battle.
Date	1128 (chronology disputed)
Location	Haram (modern Banatska Palanka, Serbia) 44°50′N 21°20′E
Result	Byzantine victory

Belligerents
Byzantine Empire	Kingdom of Hungary; Grand Principality of Serbia

Commanders and leaders
John II Komnenos; John Axouch	Setephel

Strength
Unknown	Unknown

Casualties and losses
Unknown	Unknown, possibly heavy

The Battle of Haram or Chramon (modern Banatska Palanka) was fought between the forces of King Stephen II (r. 1116–1131) of Hungary and Emperor John II Komnenos (r. 1118–1143) of the Byzantine Empire in the year 1128, or possibly earlier – in 1125 (the chronology is uncertain), in what is now Serbia, and resulted in a major defeat for the Hungarians. The site of the battle was near the confluence of the Karaš/Caraș and the Danube, between Banatska Palanka and Baziaș, on the modern border between Serbia and Romania.

== Background ==
John II was married to the Hungarian princess Piroska, and this involved him in the dynastic struggles of the Kingdom of Hungary. In giving asylum to Álmos, a blinded claimant to the Hungarian throne, John aroused the suspicions of King Stephen II of Hungary. John refused a demand from Stephen that Álmos be surrendered to him. The Hungarians, led by the king, then crossed the Danube frontier and invaded Byzantium's Balkan provinces. Most authorities place this event in 1127, with hostilities lasting until 1129; however, an alternative chronology has been suggested with the Hungarian attack and Byzantine retaliation taking place in 1125 with a renewal of hostilities in 1126. The Hungarians attacked Belgrade, Niš, and Sofia; John, who was near Philippopolis in Thrace, counterattacked, supported by a naval flotilla operating on the River Danube.

== Battle ==
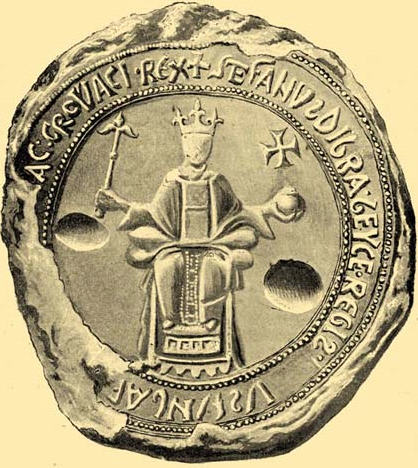
Seal of Stephen II of Hungary (r. 1116–1131).

After a challenging campaign, the details of which are obscure, John II managed to defeat the Hungarians and their Serbian allies at the fortress of Haram or Chramon, on the Hungarian bank of the Danube. The Hungarian army, under a commander named Setephel as King Stephen was ill, had entrenched itself, defending the line of the Danube.

The Hungarian Chronicle indicates that the Byzantines gained naval control of the river; it says that the 'Greeks' had set the Hungarian ships "alight with sulphurous fires", indicating the use of the incendiary weapon, 'Greek fire'. The Byzantine historian John Cinnamus describes John II employing a ruse to allow his army to cross the river. He sent a mercenary force composed of "Ligurian knights" (Lombards) and Turks (probably horse archers) to threaten a crossing upstream, while he stayed on the shore opposite Haram with the rest of his army. The ruse worked as his army crossed the river at Haram by boat, the emperor himself on board the imperial trireme. An opposed river crossing is one of the most demanding of military operations. The Byzantine army must have been very disciplined and well supported by archers and bolt-firing artillery on the imperial ships.

Once on the Hungarian bank of the Danube the Byzantine cavalry then, "with couched lances, scattered the assembled Hungarian forces." Many Hungarian troops were killed when a bridge they were crossing collapsed as they were fleeing from the Byzantine attack. The Byzantines took Haram, and other Hungarian fortified settlements in the area, and collected a great deal of plunder. The action has been described as a "bloody battle" and a great defeat for the Hungarians.

The Hungarian Chronicle says of the battle: "The hand of God was with the Greeks and the Hungarians could not resist them. The slaughter that took place was so great that its like has rarely been seen. The river Karas was so infused with human blood that it appeared to flow with gore alone. The warriors began to throw corpses into the river and fled across them, crossing the river as if by a bridge. However, more Hungarians were slaughtered like cattle, for nothing could save them from the Greeks".

== Aftermath ==
Following his victory over the Hungarians John II launched a punitive raid against the Serbs. Dangerously for the Byzantines the Serbs had aligned themselves with Hungary. Many Serbian prisoners were taken, and these were transported to Nicomedia in Asia Minor to serve as military colonists. This was done partly to cow the Serbs into submission (Serbia was, at least nominally, a Byzantine protectorate), and partly to strengthen the Byzantine frontier in the east against the Turks. The Serbs were forced to acknowledge Byzantine suzerainty once again.

In Hungary, the defeat at Haram undermined Stephen II's authority and he faced a serious revolt when two counts, named 'Bors' (possibly Boris Kalamanos) and 'Ivan', were declared kings. Both were eventually defeated, Ivan being beheaded and Bors fleeing to Byzantium.

Following this, the Hungarians renewed hostilities, possibly in order that King Stephen could be seen to reassert his authority, by attacking the Byzantine frontier fortress of Braničevo, which was immediately rebuilt by John. Further Byzantine military successes – Choniates mentions several engagements – resulted in a restoration of peace. Cinnamus describes a Byzantine reverse occurring before peace was established, which suggests that the campaign was not entirely one-sided. Hungarian records, however, agree with Choniates in indicating that King Stephen was again defeated and was consequently forced to negotiate a peace on Byzantine terms. The Byzantines were confirmed in their control of Braničevo, Belgrade, and Zemun and they also recovered the region of Sirmium (called Frangochorion in Choniates), which had been Hungarian since the 1060s. The Hungarian pretender Álmos died in 1129, removing the major source of friction.

== See also ==
- Komnenian Byzantine army

== Sources ==
=== Primary ===
- Choniates, Niketas; Magoulias, Harry J. (trans.) (1984). O City of Byzantium: Annals of Niketas Choniates. Detroit, Michigan: Wayne State University Press. ISBN 978-0-81-431764-8.
- Cinnamus, Ioannes (1976). Deeds of John and Manuel Comnenus. New York, New York and West Sussex, United Kingdom: Columbia University Press. ISBN 978-0-23-104080-8.

=== Secondary ===
- Angold, Michael (1984). The Byzantine Empire, 1025–1204: A Political History. London, United Kingdom: Longman. ISBN 9780582294684.
- Birkenmeier, John W. (2002). The Development of the Komnenian Army: 1081-1180. Boston, Massachusetts: Brill. ISBN 90-04-11710-5.
- Bury, John Bagnell (1975). The Cambridge Medieval History: The Byzantine Empire. Byzantium and its Neighbours, Volume 4. Cambridge, United Kingdom: Cambridge University Press. ISBN 978-0-52-104535-3.
- Fine, John Van Antwerp (1991). The Early Medieval Balkans: A Critical Survey from the Sixth to the Late Twelfth Century. Ann Arbor, Michigan: University of Michigan Press. ISBN 978-0-47-208149-3.
- Koledarov, Petăr (1989). Političeska geografija na srednovekovnata bălgarska dăržava 2, 1186–1396. Sofia, Bulgaria: Bulgarian Academy of Sciences.
- Lau, M.C.G. (2016) The Naval Reform of Emperor John II Komnenos: a Re-evaluation, Mediterranean Historical Review, 31:2, 115-138, DOI:10.1080/09518967.2016.1248641, https://doi.org/10.1080/09518967.2016.1248641
- Makk, Ferenc (1989). The Arpads and the Comneni: Political Relations between Hungary and Byzantium in the 12th Century. Budapest, Hungary: Akadémiai Kiadó. ISBN 978-9-63-055268-4.
- Stephenson, Paul (2000) Byzantium's Balkan Frontier: A Political Study of the Northern Balkans, 900-1204, Cambridge University Press. ISBN 0-521-77017-3
