= Felicia of Sicily =

Hungarian and Croatian Queen consort (c.1078–c.1102)

Felicia of Sicily (also Elateria) (c. 1078 – c. 1102) is the presumed name of a Queen consort of Hungary and Croatia.

She was daughter of Count Roger I of Sicily and his second wife, Eremburga of Mortain. She is also called Busilla, but this name is a misunderstanding of the Latin word puella meaning "girl".

Coloman, King of Hungary sent his envoys to her father's court to propose marriage to her in 1096, but the Count of Sicily did not qualify the envoys illustrious enough and refused the offer. The second mission of the King of Hungary was led by Bishop Hartvik, but insisted on further negotiations. Finally, the envoys, led by Prince Álmos, accompanied Felicia to Hungary, where she was married to Coloman around 1097.

She was followed by some Sicilian courtiers as well, e.g. the ancestors of the future gens Rátót (Olivér and Rátót) who arrived to Hungary in her escort. Allegedly, these courtiers became so powerful that they started controlling many actions of the court.

== Marriage and children ==
She married King Coloman of Hungary (c. 1070 – 3 February 1116) around 1097. They had the following children:

- Sophia (before 1101 – ?), wife of a Hungarian noble
- King Stephen II of Hungary (1101 – 1 March 1131)
- Ladislaus (?)

== Sources ==
- Soltész, István: Árpád-házi királynék (Gabo, 1999)
- Kristó, Gyula - Makk, Ferenc: Az Árpád-ház uralkodói (IPC Könyvek, 1996)

Royal titles
| Preceded by Adelaide of Rheinfelden | Queen consort of Hungary c. 1097–c. 1102 | Succeeded by Eufemia of Kiev |
