= Sophia (Coloman of Hungary's daughter) =

Sophia of Hungary
- Born: 1097-1100
- Issue: Saul
- House: House of Árpád
- Father: Coloman of Hungary
- Mother: Felicia of Sicily

Sophia was the eldest known child of King Coloman of Hungary and his wife, Felicia of Sicily. She was born between 1097 and 1100. Her son Saul was the heir presumptive to her childless brother, Stephen II of Hungary.

== Life ==
Sophia is one of the three children and the only daughter of Coloman the Learned whose name was recorded in the chronicles. Her mother was Felicia of Sicily, her father's first wife. As her parents' marriage took place in 1097, Sophia could not have been born before that year. According to Kristó, "it is beyond doubt" that she was named after her paternal grandaunt. Her brothers, twins Stephen and Ladislaus, were born in 1101.

The only certain fact of her life is the name of her son, Saul. The Illuminated Chronicle narrates that her brother, King Stephen II of Hungary, who was childless, "so ordered the succession to the throne that after his death the son of his sister Sophia, by name Saul, should reign." According to historian Márta Font, at that time—around 1130—Saul was about fifteen years old, implying that his mother must have been born in 1100 at the latest. Neither the name nor the family of her husband are known.

== Sources ==
- Font, Márta (2001). Koloman the Learned, King of Hungary (Supervised by Gyula Kristó, Translated by Monika Miklán). Márta Font (supported by the Publication Commission of the Faculty of Humanities of the University of Pécs). ISBN 963-482-521-4.
- Kristó, Gyula; Makk, Ferenc (1996). Az Árpád-ház uralkodói [=Rulers of the House of Árpád] (in Hungarian). I.P.C. Könyvek. ISBN 963-7930-97-3.
- Makk, Ferenc (1989). The Árpáds and the Comneni: Political Relations between Hungary and Byzantium in the 12th century (Translated by György Novák). Akadémiai Kiadó. ISBN 963-05-5268-X.
- The Hungarian Illuminated Chronicle: Chronica de Gestis Hungarorum (Edited by Dezső Dercsényi) (1970). Corvina, Taplinger Publishing. ISBN 0-8008-4015-1.
