= Iaroslav Sviatopolkovich =

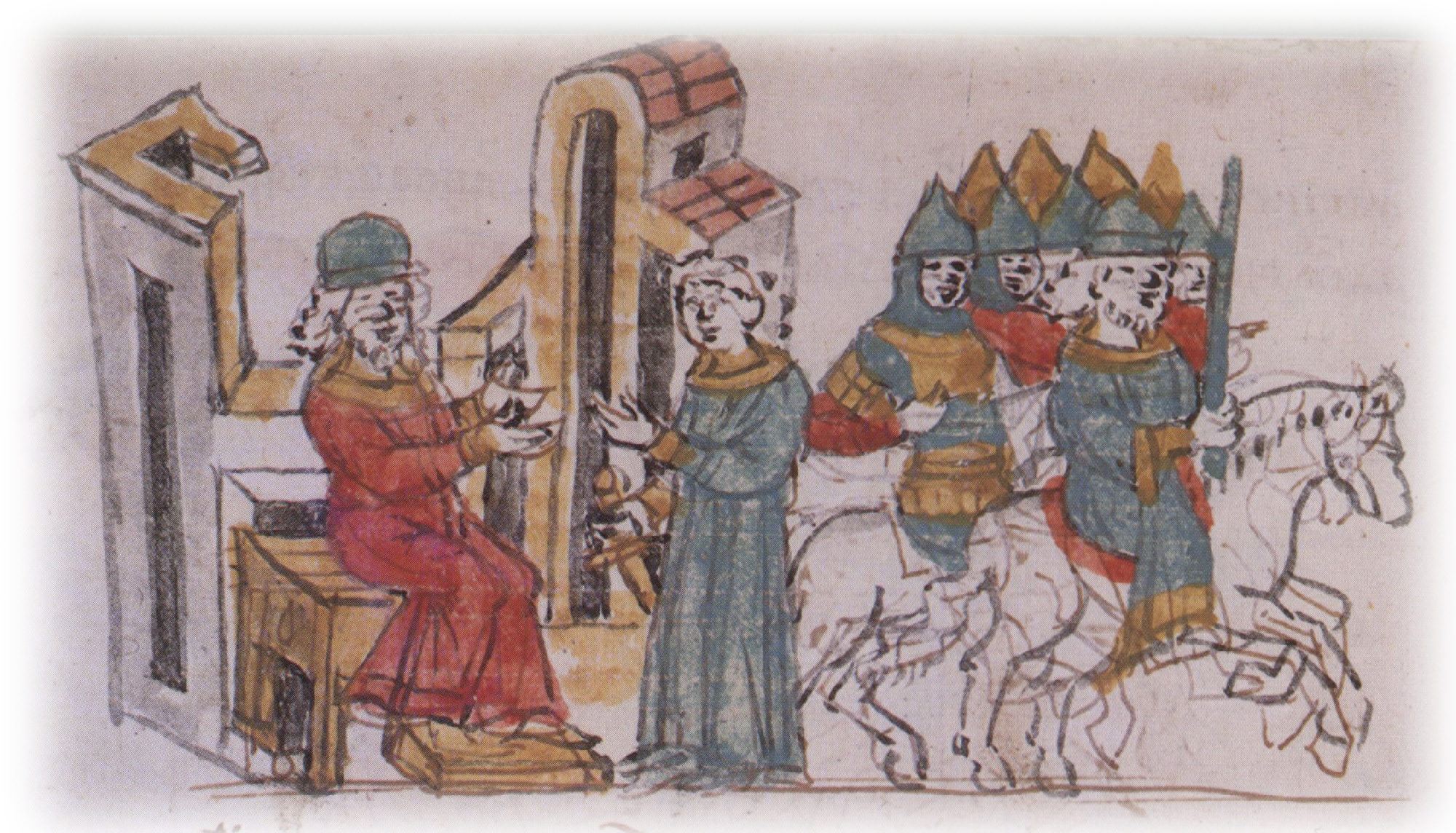
Flight of Yaroslav Svyatopolkovich to Poland; reign in Vladimir Volynsky of the son of Monomakh - Roman Vladimirovich.

Iaroslav Sviatopolkovich, also known as Iaroslav or Yaroslav Sviatopolchich (1070s – 1124), was Prince of Volhynia from 1100 to 1118.

== Early life ==
Iaroslav was the second son of Sviatopolk Iziaslavich (who was the youngest son of Iziaslav I Iaroslavich, Grand Prince of Kiev). Iziaslav fled to Poland after his brothers, Sviatoslav Iaroslavich and Vsevolod Iaroslavich, dethroned him in 1073. Sviatopolk accompanied his exiled father. Historian Márta Font proposes that Sviatopolk had most probably fathered children by the time he left Kievan Rus'.

One "Gerasclauus, the son of the king of the Ruthenians" was listed among the witnesses of the deed of foundation of the Somogyvár Abbey in 1091. The document also recorded that Gerasclauus was the son-in-law of Ladislaus I of Hungary. Font associates Gerasclauus with Iaroslav, (Note: Historian György Györffy proposes, that Gerasclauus was Iaroslav Sviatopolkovich's cousin, Iaroslav Sviatoslavich, but Font emphasizes that Sviatoslavich's connections to Hungary cannot be proven.) because Iaroslav's good relationship with the Hungarian kings is well-documented. She says that Iaroslav most probably married Ladislaus I's daughter in the early 1090s. In 1097, his father sent Iaroslav to Hungary to persuade Coloman, King of Hungary to support him.

== Prince ==
Iaroslav's father, Vladimir Monomakh, Oleg and Davyd Sviatoslavich assembled at Uvetichi on 30 August 1100. They summoned David Igorevich, the Prince of Volhynia to their conference. They dispossessed David Igorevich and gave Volhynia to Iaroslav

Along with other Rus' princes, Iaroslav and his father accompanied Vladimir Monomakh to a campaign against the Cumans as far as the river Don in early 1111. Their united troops defeated the Cumans at Sugrov on 27 March.

Sviatopolk Iziaslavich died in Kiev on 16 April 1116. Iaroslav was staying in the town when his father died, but the townspeople offered the throne to Vladimir Monomakh. Monomakh accepted the offer and came to Kiev on 20 April.

== In exile ==
Iaroslav first fled to Hungary to seek assistance from Stephen II of Hungary. He allegedly soon left Hungary for Poland, because he launched several campaigns against his former principality at the head of Polish troops from 1118, according to the Kiev Chronicle (in the Hypatian Codex). Vladimir Monomach always repelled his attacks.

== Sources ==
- Dimnik, Martin (2016). Power Politics in Kievan Rus': Vladimir Monomakh and His Dynasty, 1054–1246. Pontifical Institute of Mediaeval Studies. ISBN 978-0-88844-202-4.
- Font, Márta (2005). Árpád-házi királyok és Rurikida fejedelmek [Árpádian Kings and Rurikid Princes] (in Hungarian). Szegedi Középkorász Műhely. ISBN 963-482726-8.
- Franklin, Simon; Shepard, Jonathan (1996). The Emergence of Rus 750–1200. Longman. ISBN 0-582-49091-X.
- Makk, Ferenc (1989). The Árpáds and the Comneni: Political Relations between Hungary and Byzantium in the 12th century. Akadémiai Kiadó. ISBN 963-05-5268-X.
- Martin, Janet (1993). Medieval Russia, 980–1584. Cambridge University Press. ISBN 978-0-521-67636-6.
