= Stephen II of Hungary =

King of Hungary from 1116 to 1131

Stephen II
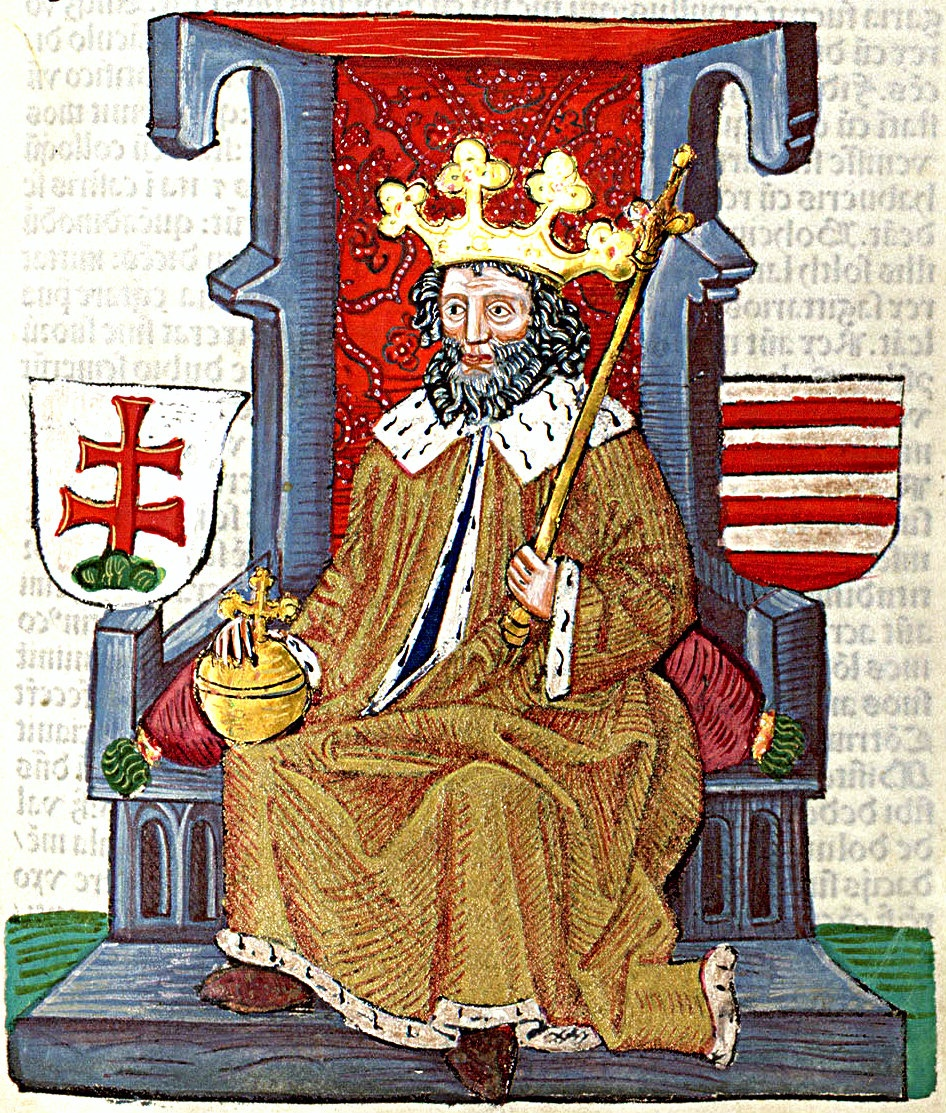
- Stephen II depicted in János Thuróczy's Chronicle of the Hungarians

King of Hungary and Croatia
- Reign: 3 February 1116 – 1 March 1131
- Coronation: 1105 (junior king); 1116, Székesfehérvár
- Predecessor: Coloman
- Successor: Béla II
- Born: 1101
- Died: c. 1 March 1131
- Burial: Várad Cathedral (Oradea, Romania)
- Spouse: A daughter of Robert I of Capua
- Dynasty: Árpád dynasty
- Father: Coloman, King of Hungary
- Mother: Felicia of Sicily
- Religion: Roman Catholic

Stephen II (Hungarian: II. István; Croatian: Stjepan II.; Slovak: Štefan II.; 1101 – early 1131) was King of Hungary and Croatia from 1116 until 1131. His father, King Coloman, had him crowned as a child, thus denying the crown to his uncle Álmos. In the first year of his reign, Venice occupied Dalmatia and Stephen never restored his rule in that province. His reign was characterized by frequent wars with neighbouring countries.

== Early years (till 1116) ==
Stephen and his twin brother, Ladislaus, were sons of the Hungarian king Coloman by his wife, Felicia of Sicily. According to the Illuminated Chronicle, they were born "... in the year of our Lord 1101." Stephen was named after the first king of Hungary, who had been canonized in 1083, implying that he was his father's heir from birth. A document written in Zadar in approximately 1105 AD makes mention of "Stephen, our most renowned king" along with Coloman, proving that the latter had his four-year-old son crowned king.

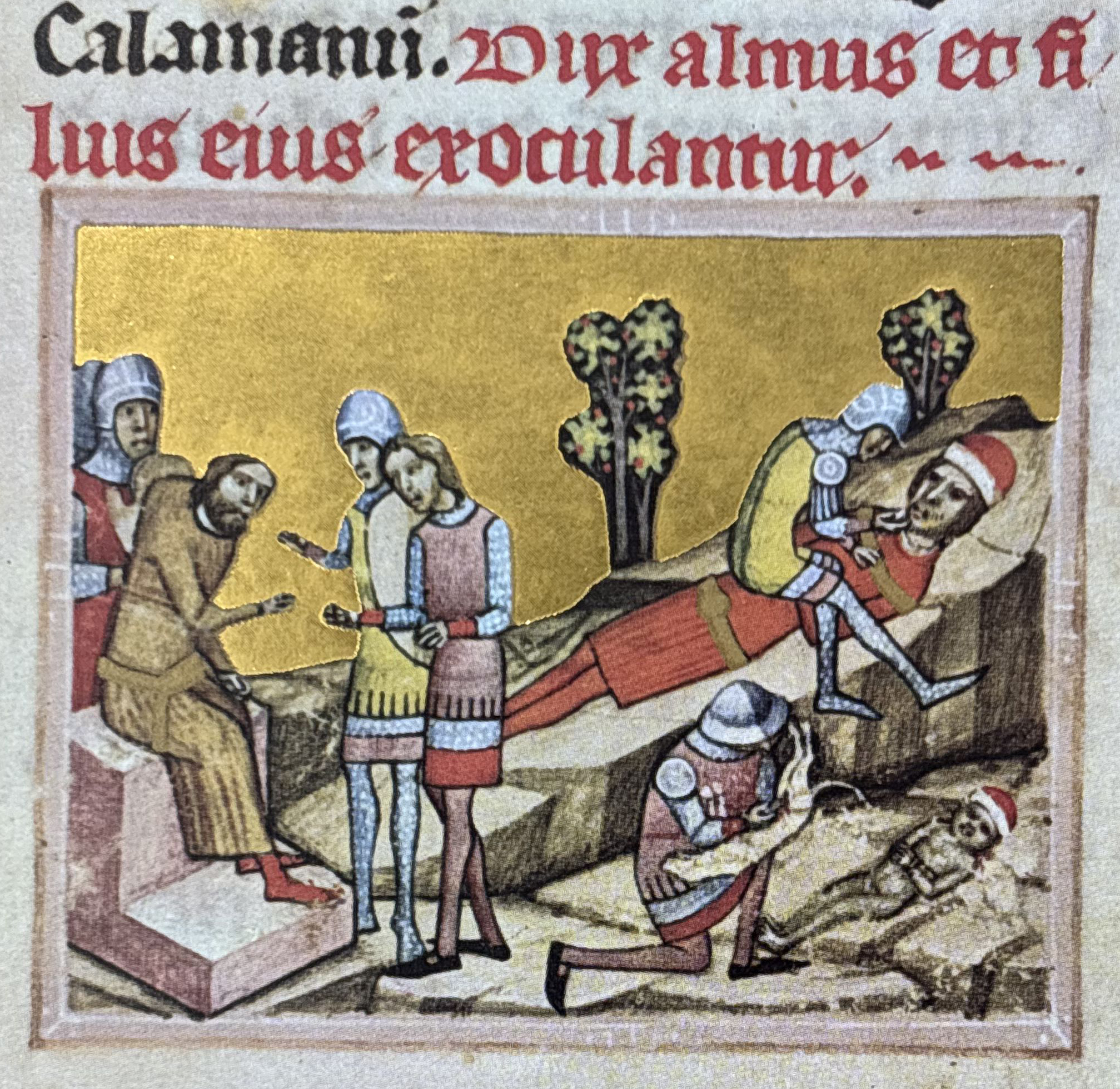
Álmos and his son, Béla are blinded on Coloman's order (from the Illuminated Chronicle)

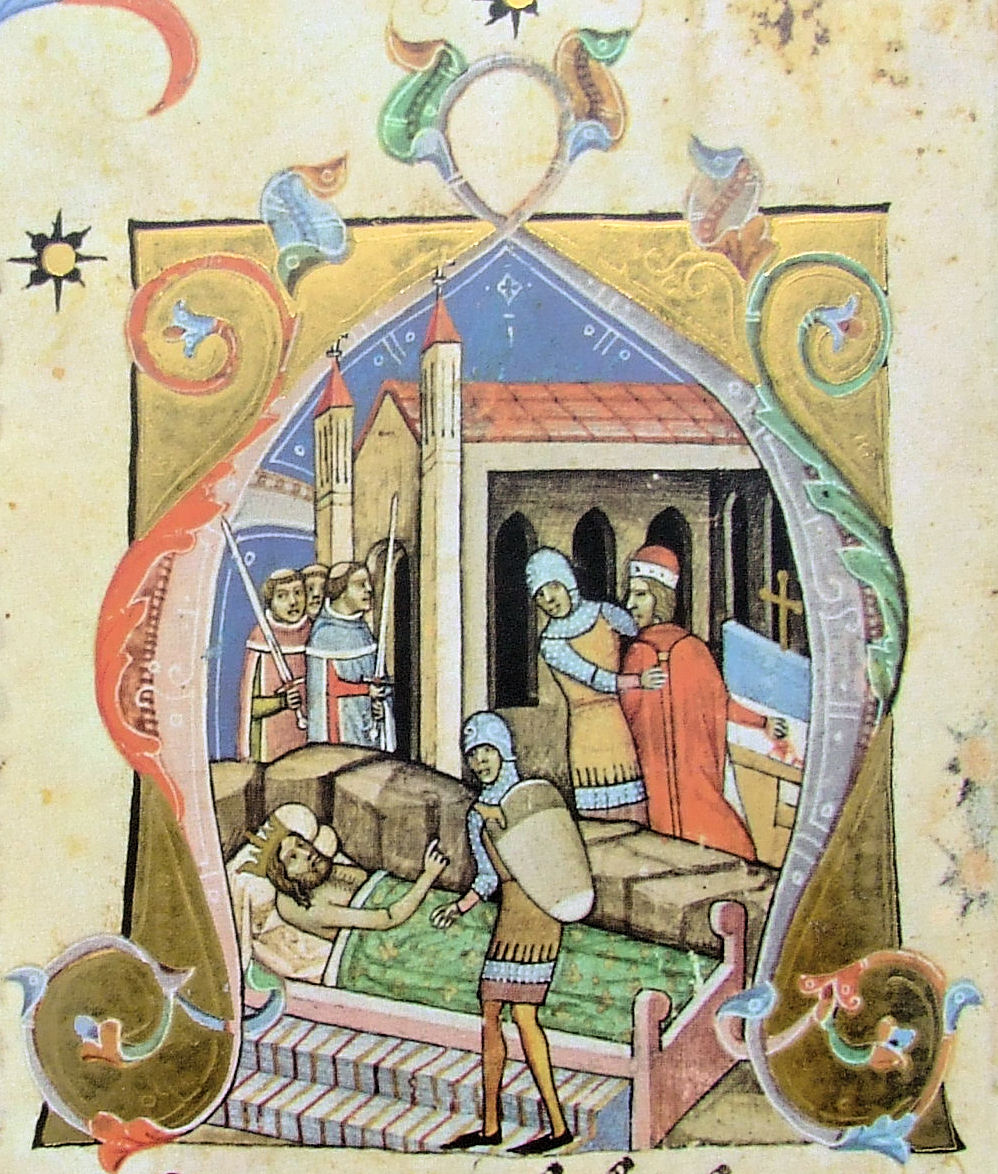
Coloman had the blind Álmos imprisoned before his death (from the Illuminated Chronicle)

By the time of Stephen's coronation, Coloman had demonstrated his intention to secure the succession for his son. Coloman's ambitious brother, Álmos — who had already rebelled against the king in 1098 — opposed this plan and left Hungary. He first sought the assistance of Henry V, Holy Roman Emperor, followed by an appeal to Duke Boleslaw III of Poland. When all of his efforts ended in failure, Álmos submitted to Coloman and returned to Hungary, although he made several abortive attempts to dethrone Coloman in the following decade. In order to bring an end to the threat these plots presented to Stephen's succession, Coloman had Álmos and Álmos's young son, Béla, blinded.

When he fell gravely ill in early 1116, Coloman also had his brother imprisoned. The Illuminated Chronicle narrates that the dying king "instructed his son and his great men" to invade Rus' in order to take vengeance for Coloman's failure in the 1099 siege of Peremyshl (Przemyśl), Poland. Coloman died on 3 February 1116.

== Reign ==
=== Wars and internal conflicts (1116–1127) ===
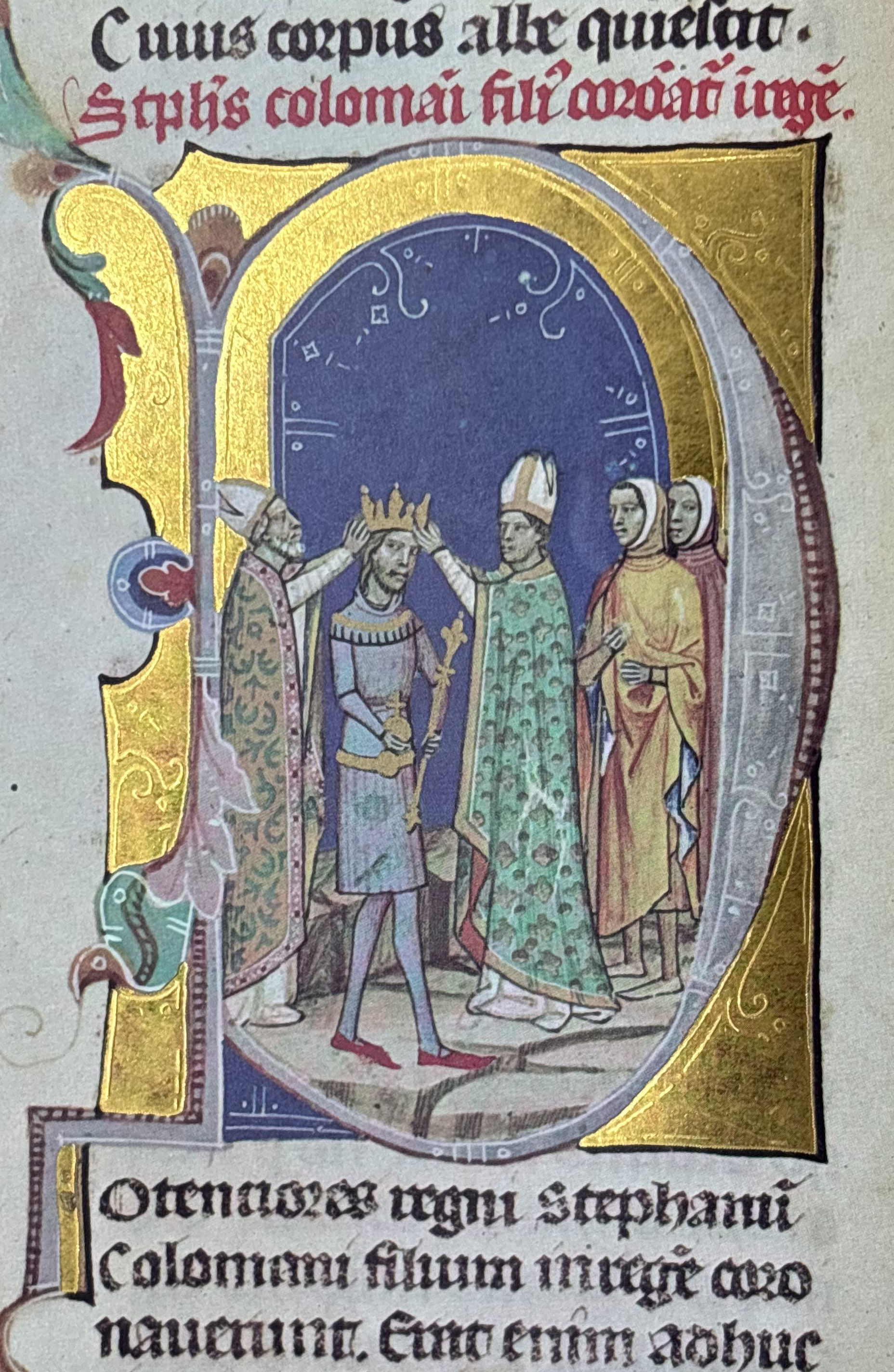
Stephen is crowned king in February 1116 (from the Illuminated Chronicle)

Stephen was crowned king by Archbishop Lawrence of Esztergom in Székesfehérvár within thirty days of his father's death. His peaceful succession showed the effectiveness of the measures Coloman had implemented to prevent Álmos from usurping the throne. Upon his councilor's advice, Stephen initiated a meeting with Vladislaus I, Duke of Bohemia, in order to improve the countries' relations, which had deteriorated in the previous decade. The two monarchs met on the river Olšava, which marked the border of their realms. However, the lack of mutual confidence hindered the opening of negotiations, leading to armed conflicts which evolved into a battle on 13 May. On the battlefield, the Bohemian army inflicted a serious defeat on Stephen's troops. The contemporaneous Cosmas of Prague blamed the young king's advisors for the fiasco, but later medieval Hungarian chronicles — all completed under kings descending from Stephen's opponent, Álmos — wrote that the king acted without consulting his advisors "for he was of an impetuous nature".

The Hungarian people are prodigious in energy, mighty in strength, and very powerful in military arms, sufficient to fight with a king of lands anywhere. After the death of their king, Coloman, their princes sent to Duke Vladislav to renew and confirm with the new king, named Stephen, their ancient peace and friendship. Vladislav came to the River Olšava, which separates the realms of Hungary and Moravia. Immediately, the Hungarian people, innumerable as the sands or drops of rain, covered the whole surface of the land in the field of Lučsko, like locusts. But, as scripture says, "Woe to the land whose king is a child." Their princes, through their inborn pride in themselves, strayed from the duke's peaceful words and sent replies more to stir up strife than to bring the kiss of peace.

— Cosmas of Prague: The Chronicle of the Czechs

Doge Ordelafo Faliero, who had conquered an island in the Gulf of Kvarner during the last year of Coloman's reign, returned to Dalmatia at the head of the Venetian fleet in May 1116. On 15 July, he vanquished the Hungarian troops which had arrived to relieve Zadar. Thereafter all towns — including Biograd na Moru, Šibenik, Split, and Trogir — surrendered to Venice, terminating Stephen II's suzerainty along the coastline of the Adriatic Sea. However, in either 1117 or 1118, the Hungarian troops were able to defeat the Venetians, during which Ordelafo Faliero himself died at a battle near Zadar, enabling Biograd na Moru, Split, and Trogir to rejoin the sovereignty of the Hungarian monarch. However, the new doge, Domenico Michele, invaded and reconquered all Dalmatia. A five-year truce, which was concluded in 1117 or 1118, confirmed the status quo: the seizure of Dalmatia by Venice.

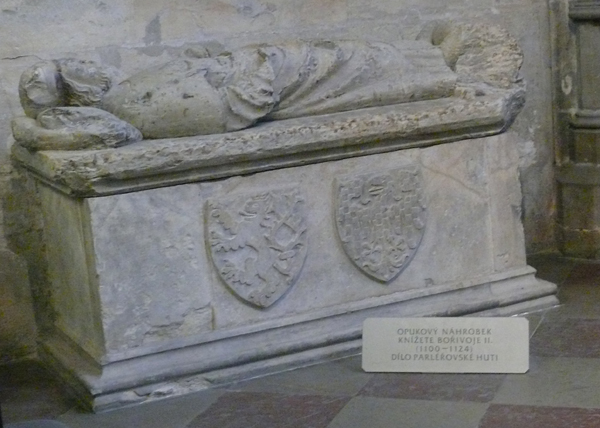
Tomb of Bořivoj II, Duke of Bohemia—he fought against Hungary, but died in exile in Stephen II's court

Stephen's troops launched a plundering raid into Austria in 1118, provoking a counter-attack by Leopold III, Margrave of Austria, later that same year. Bořivoj II, Duke of Bohemia, supported Leopold and pillaged the northwestern regions of the Kingdom of Hungary. Despite this, when Vladislaus I dethroned his brother Bořivoj in 1120, Bořivoj fled to Hungary and settled at Stephen's court.

Stephen married a daughter of Robert I of Capua, in the early 1120s. Historian Paul Stephenson wrote that Stephen's marriage alliance with the Normans of Southern Italy "must have been partly directed against the Venetians." The Norman princes of Capua had been the pope's staunch supporters during the Investiture Controversy, suggesting that his marriage also continued his father's pro-Papal foreign policy. According to Włodzimierz Dworzaczek, Stephen in 1121 married Adelhaid, daughter of Heinrich, burgrave of Regensburg.

Stephen's cousin and the daughter of his uncle Álmos, Adelaide, whose husband Soběslav had been expelled from Moravia, arrived in Hungary in early 1123. According to Cosmas of Prague, Stephen "kindly received her, acknowledging her as his relative", which implies that his relations with his uncle were cordial around that time. In the same year, the young king launched a military expedition against the Principality of Volhynia in order to assist its expelled prince, Iaroslav Sviatopolkovich, regain his throne. Even though Sviatopolchich was assassinated at the beginning of the siege of his former seat, Volodymyr-Volynskyi, Stephen decided to continue the war. However, according to the Illuminated Chronicle, his commanders threatened to dethrone him if he continued the aggression, forcing Stephen to lift the siege and return to Hungary.

Cosma, of the line of Paznan, stood up before the King and said: "Lord, what is this thing which you are doing? If with the death of a multitude of your soldiers you take the castle, whom will you appoint as its lord? If you choose one among your nobles, he will not remain here. Or do you wish to abandon your kingdom and yourself have the dukedom? We barons will not storm the castle. If you wish to storm it, storm it alone. We are returning to Hungary and we will choose for ourselves a king." Then by order of the nobles the heralds announced throughout the camp that the Hungarians should return as speedily as possible to Hungary. When the King thus saw himself justly deprived of the help of his people, he returned to Hungary.

— The Hungarian Illuminated Chronicle

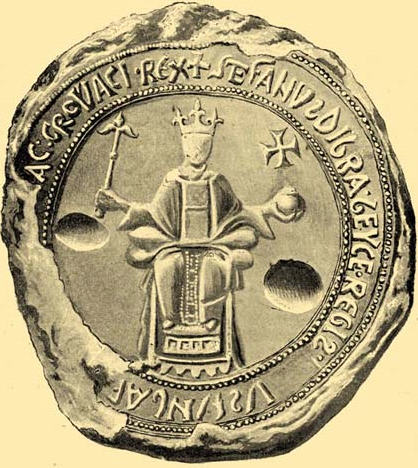
Seal of Stephen II

Taking advantage of the absence of the Venetian fleet from the Adriatic Sea because of a naval expedition in the Levant, Stephen invaded Dalmatia in the first half of 1124. His charter confirming the liberation of Split and Trogir in July 1124 is evidence that the central regions of Dalmatia returned to his rule. However, upon the return of the Venetian armada the Dalmatian towns once again surrendered, one after another. According to the Historia Ducum Veneticorum, only the citizens of Biograd na Moru "dared resist the doge and his army", but "their city was razed to its foundations."

According to the Illuminated Chronicle, the blind Álmos, "fearing death at the hands of King Stephen", fled to the Byzantine Empire. Many of his partisans followed him, and Emperor John II Komnenos settled them in a town in Macedonia. The Byzantine historian John Kinnamos confirmed that the emperor looked upon Álmos "favorably and received him with kindness." He added that Stephen "sent his envoys to the emperor and demanded that [Álmos] be expelled from the Byzantine Empire", but his request was rejected. The sources do not specify the date which Álmos's fled, but it likely occurred circa 1125. Historian Ferenc Makk wrote that Álmos was forced to flee from Hungary because he had taken advantage of Stephen's failures in Volhynia and Dalmatia, and conspired against Stephen.

Stephen met Soběslav, the new duke of Bohemia, in October 1126. Their meeting brought an end to the hostilities between their two states. Around the same year, Stephen also concluded an agreement with Archbishop Conrad I of Salzburg.

=== Last years (1127–1131) ===
According to the Byzantine chronicler Niketas Choniates, the citizens of the Byzantine town Braničevo "attacked and plundered the Hungarians who had come to [the Byzantine Empire] to trade, perpetrating the worst crimes against them." In retaliation, Stephen decided to wage war against the Byzantine Empire. The Illuminated Chronicle relates that the childless Stephen "so ordered the succession to the throne that after his death the son of his sister Sophia, by name Saul, should reign." The chronicle does not specify the date of this event, but Ferenc Makk says that Stephen most probably declared Saul as his heir during the first half of 1127, before attacking the Byzantine Empire.

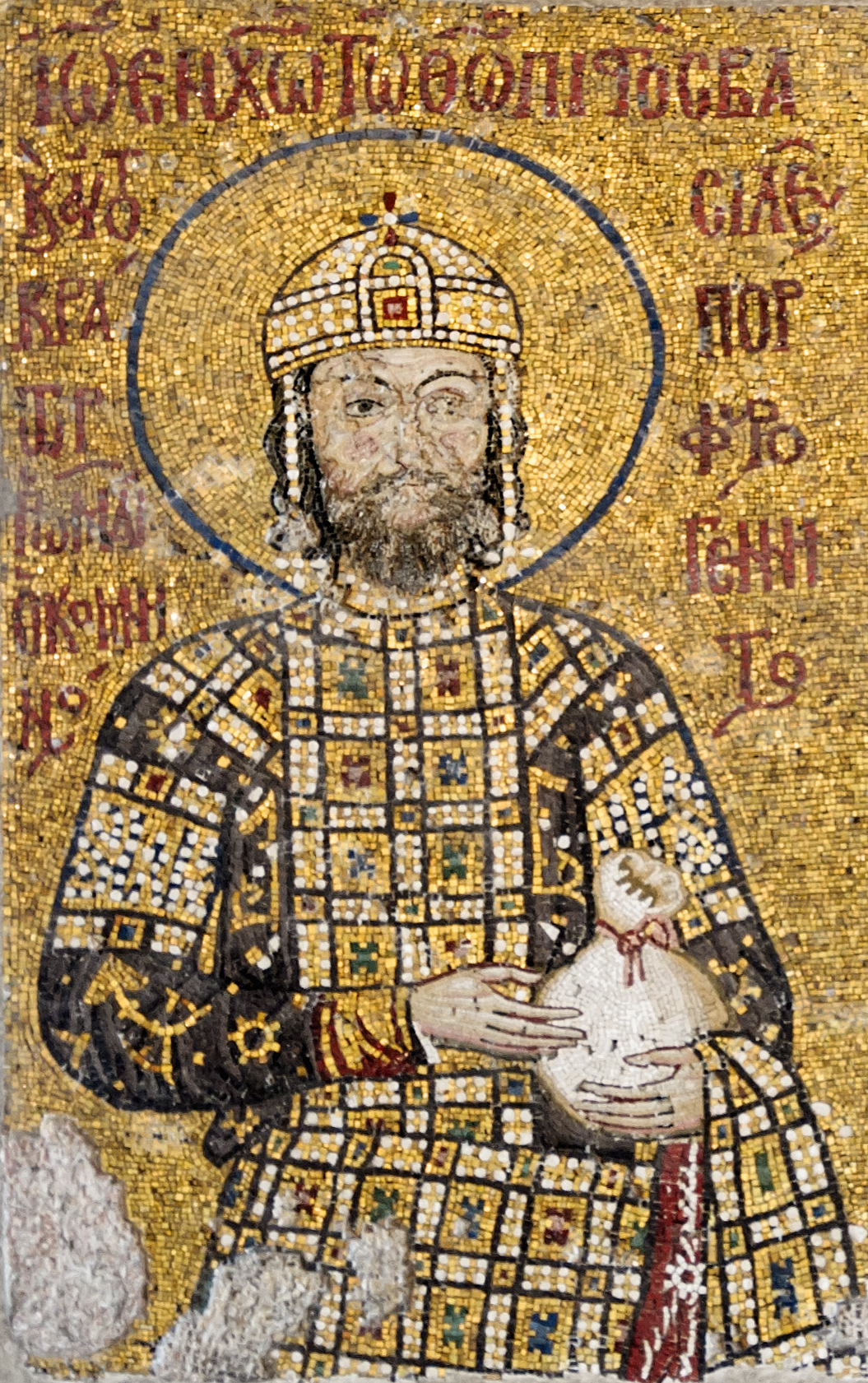
Mosaic portrait of the Byzantine Emperor John II Komnenos in the Hagia Sophia (Istanbul, Turkey)

Stephen broke through the Byzantine border in the summer. His troops sacked Belgrade, Braničevo and Niš, and plundered the regions around Serdica (Sofia, Bulgaria) and Philippopolis (Plovdiv, Bulgaria), before returning to Hungary. In response, Emperor John II marched against Hungary in 1128, where he defeated the royal troops in a battle at Haram, and "captured Frangochorion, the richest land in Hungary" (now in Serbia). Stephen was unable to participate in the fighting because "he happened to be sickly in body and was recuperating someplace in the midst of his land", according to John Kinnamos. The Illuminated Chronicle said that his illness was so serious that "all expected his death." The chronicle added that "traitors" went so far as to elect two kings, the "Counts Bors and Ivan". Upon regaining his health, Stephen had Ivan executed and expelled Bors from his kingdom.

John Kinnamos wrote of a second campaign by Stephen against the Byzantines. The Hungarian troops, supported by Czech reinforcements under the command of Duke Vaclav of Olomouc, took Braničevo by storm and destroyed its fortress. Emperor John II Komnenos was forced to retreat and sue for peace. Historian Ferenc Makk writes that the resulting peace treaty was signed in October 1129.

Going to Branitshevo for a second time, [Emperor John] made haste to rebuild it. Since some time elapsed in the task, the army, suffering from winter weather and lack of necessities, was in severe distress. When he learned this, the Hungarians' king decided to cross the Danube as quickly as possible and attack them unexpectedly. In the Hungarians' land, however, there was a woman, a Latin by birth, outstanding in wealth and other distinction. Sending to the emperor, she revealed what was being planned. Since he was unable to engage them with an equivalent force, because as stated his army had already been overcome by disease and lack of necessities, he fortified the city where possible and withdrew.

— John Kinnamos: Deeds of John and Manuel Comnenus

For many years, Stephen believed that his cousin, Béla, had died after being blinded on the orders of Stephen's father. Having learnt, around 1129, that Béla was alive, the king "rejoiced with great joy", according to the Illuminated Chronicle. He even granted Béla the town of Tolna and arranged Béla's marriage with Helena of Rascia.

The Illuminated Chronicle recounts that Stephen showed blatant favoritism towards the "Comans", identified as Pechenegs or Cumans by historians, who had arrived in Hungary in the 1120s. In his last years, he even tolerated the crimes they committed against his subjects, a policy which eventually led to a revolt. Before his death, Stephen "laid aside his royal state and took the habit of a monk". He died of dysentery in the spring of 1131. No source recorded the exact date of his death, but most of his biographies state that he died on 1 March. He was buried in the Várad Cathedral (Oradea, Romania).

== Family ==
Ancestors of Stephen II of Hungary

16. Vazul
8. Béla I of Hungary
17. A lady of the Tátony clan
4. Géza I of Hungary
18. Mieszko II Lambert of Poland
9. Richeza or Adelaide of Poland
19. Richeza of Lotharingia
2. Coloman of Hungary
5. Sophia
1. Stephen II of Hungary
12. Tancred of Hauteville
6. Roger I of Sicily
13. Fressenda
3. Felicia of Sicily

According to the Illuminated Chronicle, Stephen had no "wish to marry a lawful wife but took to himself concubines and harlots". However, his advisors, "grieving that the kingdom was in a sorry state and the King without an heir", persuaded him to marry. They chose a daughter of the late Robert I of Capua as their monarch's wife, although her name was not recorded. Stephen died childless.

The following family tree presents Stephen's ancestors and some of his relatives who are mentioned in the article.

Sophia*	Géza I	unnamed Synadene*
Felicia of Sicily	Coloman	Eufemia of Kiev	Álmos
Sophia	Stephen II	A daughter of Robert I of Capua	Ladislaus	Béla the Blind
Saul	Kings of Hungary

*Whether Géza's first or second wife was his children's mother is uncertain.

== Sources ==
=== Primary sources ===
- Cosmas of Prague: The Chronicle of the Czechs (Translated with an introduction and notes by Lisa Wolverton) (2009). The Catholic University of America Press. ISBN 978-0-8132-1570-9.
- Deeds of John and Manuel Comnenus by John Kinnamos (Translated by Charles M. Brand) (1976). Columbia University Press. ISBN 0-231-04080-6.
- O City of Byzantium, Annals of Niketas Choniatēs (Translated by Harry J. Magoulias) (1984). Wayne State University Press. ISBN 978-0-8143-1764-8.
- The Hungarian Illuminated Chronicle: Chronica de Gestis Hungarorum (Edited by Dezső Dercsényi) (1970). Corvina, Taplinger Publishing. ISBN 0-8008-4015-1.

=== Secondary sources ===
- Bartl, Július; Čičaj, Viliam; Kohútova, Mária; Letz, Róbert; Segeš, Vladimír; Škvarna, Dušan (2002). Slovak History: Chronology & Lexicon. Bolchazy-Carducci Publishers, Slovenské Pedegogické Nakladatel'stvo. ISBN 0-86516-444-4.
- Engel, Pál (2001). The Realm of St Stephen: A History of Medieval Hungary, 895–1526. I.B. Tauris Publishers. ISBN 1-86064-061-3.
- Fine, John V. A. Jr. (1991) [1983]. The Early Medieval Balkans: A Critical Survey from the Sixth to the Late Twelfth Century. Ann Arbor: University of Michigan Press. ISBN 0-472-08149-7.
- Font, Márta (2001). Koloman the Learned, King of Hungary (Supervised by Gyula Kristó, Translated by Monika Miklán). Márta Font (supported by the Publication Commission of the Faculty of Humanities of the University of Pécs). ISBN 963-482-521-4.
- Kontler, László (1999). Millennium in Central Europe: A History of Hungary. Atlantisz Publishing House. ISBN 963-9165-37-9.
- Kristó, Gyula; Makk, Ferenc (1996). Az Árpád-ház uralkodói [=Rulers of the House of Árpád] (in Hungarian). I.P.C. Könyvek. ISBN 963-7930-97-3.
- Makk, Ferenc (1989). The Árpáds and the Comneni: Political Relations between Hungary and Byzantium in the 12th century (Translated by György Novák). Akadémiai Kiadó. ISBN 963-05-5268-X.
- Norwich, John Julius (1992). The Normans in Sicily. Penguin Books. ISBN 978-0-14-015212-8.
- Spinei, Victor (2003). The Great Migrations in the East and South East of Europe from the Ninth to the Thirteenth Century (Translated by Dana Badulescu). Romanian Cultural Institute. ISBN 973-85894-5-2.
- Stephenson, Paul (2000). Byzantium's Balkan Frontier: A Political Study of the Northern Balkans, 900–1204. Cambridge University Press. ISBN 978-0-521-02756-4.
- Treadgold, Warren (1997). A History of the Byzantine State and Society. Stanford, California: Stanford University Press. ISBN 0-8047-2630-2.
- Wiszewski, Przemysław (2010). Domus Bolezlai: Values and Social Identity in Dynastic Traditions of Medieval Poland (c. 966–1138). Brill. ISBN 978-90-04-18142-7.

Stephen II of Hungary House of Árpád Born: 1101 Died: March 1131
Regnal titles
Preceded by Coloman	King of Hungary and Croatia; 1116–1131	Succeeded by Béla II
