= Saul of Hungary =

12th-century Hungarian royal

Saul
- Born: c. 1114
- Died: 1131
- House: Árpád dynasty
- Mother: Sophia

Saul (c. 1114 –1131) was the heir presumptive of the Kingdom of Hungary from around 1127. He was the son of Sophia, the only sister of Stephen II of Hungary. His childless uncle appointed Saul as his heir in 1127. Although Saul survived his uncle, according to a late source, he did not succeed him and died before Béla II of Hungary was crowned king in April 1131.

== Life ==
Saul was the only known son of Sophia, the daughter of Coloman the Learned, King of Hungary. The name and family of Saul's father is unknown. Historian Márta Font writes that Saul was born between 1113 and 1115.

According to the Illuminated Chronicle King Stephen II of Hungary, who was childless and delicate of health, "so ordered the succession to the throne that after his death the son of his sister Sophia, by name Saul, should reign." Historian Ferenc Makk says that Saul was appointed heir in the first half of 1127. The Illuminated Chronicle does not contain any further information of Saul's life, but a later source—the Ottoman Turkish chronicle known as Tarih-i Üngürüs or The History of the Hungarians—writes that he survived his uncle who died in the spring 1131. According to the latter source, Béla II, Stephen II's cousin, was only crowned king, on 28 April 1131, after Saul's death on an unspecified date.

== Sources ==
- Font, Márta (2001). Koloman the Learned, King of Hungary (Supervised by Gyula Kristó, Translated by Monika Miklán). Márta Font (supported by the Publication Commission of the Faculty of Humanities of the University of Pécs). ISBN 963-482-521-4.
- Kristó, Gyula; Makk, Ferenc (1996). Az Árpád-ház uralkodói [=Rulers of the House of Árpád] (in Hungarian). I.P.C. Könyvek. ISBN 963-7930-97-3.
- Makk, Ferenc (1989). The Árpáds and the Comneni: Political Relations between Hungary and Byzantium in the 12th century (Translated by György Novák). Akadémiai Kiadó. ISBN 963-05-5268-X.
- The Hungarian Illuminated Chronicle: Chronica de Gestis Hungarorum (Edited by Dezső Dercsényi) (1970). Corvina, Taplinger Publishing. ISBN 0-8008-4015-1.
