= Boris Kalamanos =

Hungarian claimant (1114-c. 1154)

Boris
- Born: c. 1114; Kievan Rus'
- Died: c. 1153 or 1154
- Spouse: Anna Doukaina (uncertain)
- Issue: Konstantinos; Stephanos (uncertain)
- Mother: Euphemia of Kiev
- Religion: Eastern Orthodoxy
- Occupation: Claimant to the Hungarian throne

Boris (Hungarian: Borisz; c. 1114 – c. 1154), also known as Boris Kalamanos (Greek: Βορίσης Καλαμάνος, Russian & Ukrainian: Борис Коломанович) was a claimant to the Hungarian throne in the middle of the 12th century. He was the son of Euphemia of Kiev, the second wife of Coloman the Learned, King of Hungary. After Euphemia was caught in adultery, Coloman expelled her from Hungary and never acknowledged that he was Boris's father. However, Boris, who was born in the Kievan Rus', regarded himself as the king's lawful son. He laid claim to Hungary after Coloman's firstborn and successor, Stephen II of Hungary, died in 1131. Boris made several attempts to assert his claims against kings Béla II and Géza II with the assistance of Poland, the Holy Roman Empire and the Byzantine Empire, but failed and was killed in a battle.

== Early life ==
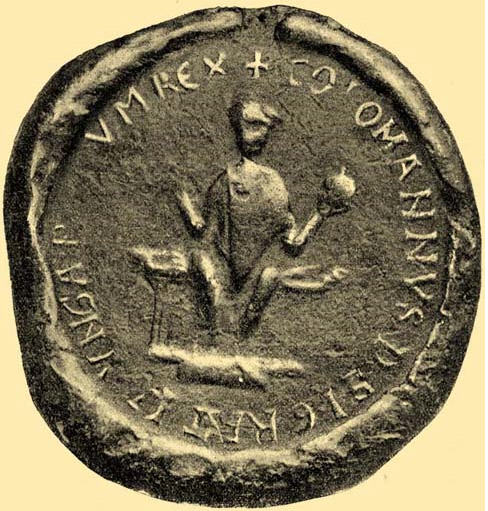
Royal seal of Coloman the Learned, King of Hungary, who expelled his wife, Boris's mother, from Hungary for adultery before Boris's birth

Boris was the son of Euphemia of Kiev, a daughter of Vladimir II Monomakh, the future grand prince of Kiev. She was given in marriage to King Coloman of Hungary in 1112. However, as the Illuminated Chronicle narrated, she "was taken in the sin of adultery". After discovering her illicit relationship, King Coloman expelled his wife from Hungary. She fled to her homeland where she gave birth to Boris around 1114. He was named after St. Boris, one of the first canonized princes of the Rurik dynasty. King Coloman never acknowledged that Boris was his son. Boris grew up in the court of his grandfather, Vladimir Monomakh, in Kiev.

A group of aggrieved Hungarian lords elected "Counts Bors and Ivan" king when Coloman the Learned's son and successor, Stephen II of Hungary, fell ill around 1128, according to the Illuminated Chronicle. However, Stephen II who regained his health ordered the execution of Ivan and expelled Bors who went to the Byzantine Empire. According to a scholarly theory, Count Bors was identical with Boris Kalamanos, but this theory has never been widely accepted. Stephen II died on 1 March 1131 and his cousin, Béla the Blind, succeeded him. At an assembly in Arad, the new king's wife, Helena of Rascia, ordered the massacre of all Hungarian lords whom she suspected of having been opposed to her husband's ascension.

== Attempts to seize Hungary ==
=== First attempt ===
After Stephen II's death, Boris "laid claim to his father's kingdom" and went to the Byzantine Empire, according to the contemporaneous Otto of Freising. The Byzantine historian John Kinnamos said that Emperor John II Komnenos "accorded [Boris] sufficient honor and united him in marriage with a bride of his own family". However, Boris left the Byzantine Empire for Poland because the emperor did not provide him military assistance, according to Otto of Freising.

Boleslaus III of Poland was willing to assist Boris, because he wanted to set up a coalition against the Holy Roman Empire. Hungarian refugees and troops from the Kievan Rus' also joined Boris. Their united army invaded Hungary in the summer of 1132. Against them, Béla the Blind allied with Leopold III of Austria. The Hungarian lords who were loyal to the blind king massacred all lords who did not openly refuse Boris's claim to the throne. In the ensuing battle, the united Hungarian and Austrian troops routed the army of Boris and his allies on the banks of the Sajó River on 22 July. Béla's victory was decisive: Boris made no further attempts to seize the throne during Béla's reign, although his ally, Boleslaus III of Poland, made peace with Béla only in August 1135.

=== Second attempt ===
Boris visited Conrad III of Germany, accompanied by Conrad's brother-in-law, Vladislaus II, Duke of Bohemia, in late 1145. He complained in "tearful and mournful tones" to Conrad that he had been deprived of his patrimony, begging Conrad to assist him in seizing Hungary, according to Otto of Freising. Vladislaus II and his wife, Gertrude of Babenberg, who supported Boris's claim, persuaded Conrad to let Boris recruit mercenaries in Austria and Bavaria.

Boris's mercenaries stormed into Hungary and captured Pressburg (now Bratislava in Slovakia) in April 1146. Géza II of Hungary – the son and successor of Béla the Blind – soon marched to the fortress and imposed a blockade on it. Géza entered into negotiations with Boris's mercenaries and bribed them into surrendering the fortress without fight. In retaliation for Boris's support, Géza invaded Austria and defeated the army of Henry Jasomirgott, Duke of Bavaria, in the Battle of the Fischa on 11 September 1146.

[The German mercenaries] made a surprise attack upon the castle of [Pressburg] ... and captured it. Some [of the defenders] they made prisoners, some were slain, others escaped by flight. When Géza, king of Hungary ... heard this, he sent ahead certain of his counts to inquire why and how this had been done, while he himself with a great throng of Hungarians followed them and hastened to the rescue of the castle. The count who had preceded him made careful inquiry of the townsmen why they had inflicted so grave an injury on the king. They replied that they had done this neither for [Conrad III] nor for Henry Jasomirgott, but for their lord, Boris. ... [Boris] frequently importuned both emperors ... for aid, and by paying money he induced many ... [German] knights to support him. So the king of Hungary came up, pitched camp, and besieged the town, making use of various kinds of engines of destruction and surrounding the town with archers. Since the Germans had no consoling prospect of liberation from siege, because [Henry Jasomirgott] was tarrying in the upper parts of Bavaria and because [Conrad III] remained in remote places of his realm, they began to treat with the Hungarians for terms of peace. ... [A]fter conferring together they received from the king under oath the promise of three thousand pounds in weight [of gold], restored the castle to him, and themselves returned to their own homes.

— Otto of Freising: The Deeds of Frederick Barbarossa

=== Third attempt ===
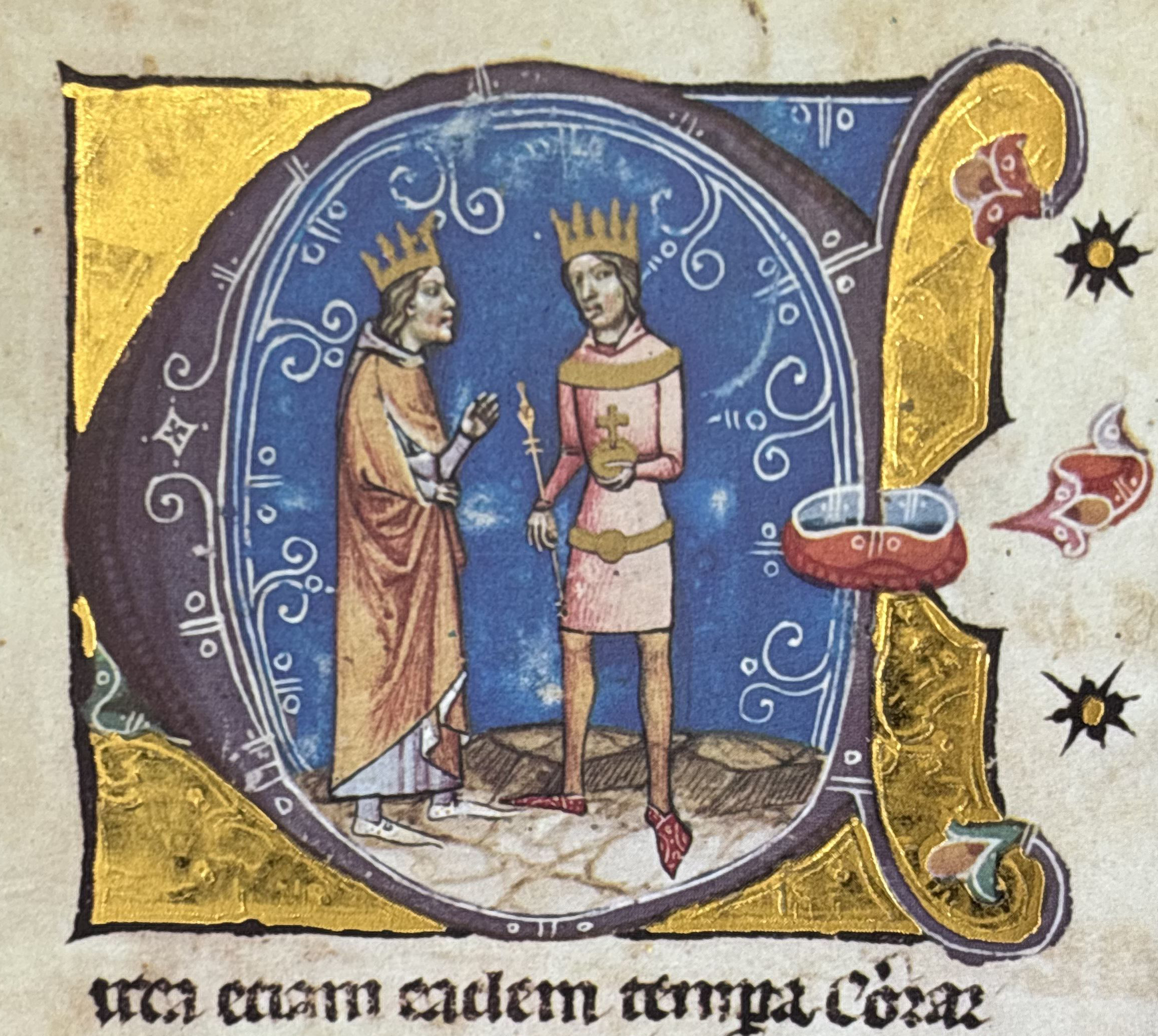
Boris's opponent, Géza II of Hungary, meets Louis VII of France, Boris's temporary patron, during the Second Crusade (from the Illuminated Chronicle)

In Christmas 1146, Conrad III declared that he would lead a crusade to the Holy Land. Boris decided to join the German crusaders to come to Hungary. However, Géza II, who was informed of Boris's plan, "poured out much money among the Germans", persuading them to refuse Boris, according to Odo of Deuil. Boris did not give up his plan, because he was informed that many Hungarian noblemen "would take him for their lord and, deserting the King, would cleave to him" if he managed to return to Hungary, according to the Illuminated Chronicle.

He approached Louis VII of France, who was also marching across Central Europe towards the Holy Land, emphasizing his hereditary right to the Hungarian throne. After Louis VII did not answer his letter, Boris persuaded two French lords to help him to secretly join the French crusaders' army who entered Hungary in the summer of 1147. After discovering that his opponent was hiding among the French, Géza II demanded Boris's extradition, but Louis VII granted asylum to Boris and refused to hand him over to Géza II, most probably because Boris's wife was related the Byzantine Emperor, Manuel I Komnenos, according to historian Ferenc Makk. Nevertheless, Boris left Hungary for the Byzantine Empire together with the French crusaders.

== Last years ==
After all his attempts to seize Hungary failed, Boris settled in the Byzantine Empire. During a war between the Byzantine Empire and Hungary in the late autumn of 1150, Boris fought in the Byzantine army. Upon Emperor Manuel's order, he pillaged the region of the Temes River at the head of a Byzantine army and forced a small Hungarian troop to flee. He only withdrew from Hungary after Géza II came to the frontier at the head of the royal army.

Boris died in 1153 or 1154. Otto of Freising said that Boris "was struck and killed by an arrow [from the bow] of a certain Cuman" while fighting against Hungary not long before 1156. On the other hand, the Byzantine historian, Niketas Choniates, wrote of "a certain Kalmanos" who "received a fatal wound and quit this life" in a battle against the "Scythians" – Pechenegs or Cumans – who raided the Byzantine territories along the Lower Danube some time after Emperor Manuel's campaign of 1150 against Hungary.

== Family ==
Boris's wife was a niece of Emperor Manuel I Komnenos, according to Odo of Deuil, but her name and family are unknown. Historian Raimund Kerbl says that she was identical with Anna Doukaina, because she styled herself kralaina ("queen") in a charter, issued in September 1157. She adopted the monastic name Arete after her husband's death. Boris married his Byzantine wife before he went to Poland in late 1131 or early 1132, because Otto of Freising mentioned his marriage before that event.

Boris's first son, sebastos Konstantinos Kalamanos, was the Byzantine governor of Cilicia between 1163 and 1175. Historian Makk identifies one Stephen, who was the cousin of the dethroned Stephen IV of Hungary, according to Kinnamos, as Boris's younger son. Neither Konstantinos nor Stephanos made attempts to seize the Hungarian throne.

== Annotations ==
1. His given name was Boris (hellenized by John Kinnamos as Βορίσης, Borisēs). In Byzantium, he became known as Kalamanos. In Russian historiography, he is referred to as Russian: Борис Коломанович or Кальманович.

== Sources ==
=== Primary sources ===
- Deeds of John and Manuel Comnenus by John Kinnamos (Translated by Charles M. Brand) (1976). Columbia University Press. ISBN 978-0-231-04080-8.
- O City of Byzantium, Annals of Niketas Choniatēs (Translated by Harry J. Magoulias) (1984). Wayne State University Press. ISBN 978-0-8143-1764-8.
- Odo of Deuil: De Profectione Ludovici VII in Orientem: The Journey of Louis VII to the East (Edited with an English Translation by Virginia Gingerick Berry) (1948). Columbia University Press.
- The Deeds of Frederick Barbarossa by Otto of Freising and his Continuator, Rahewin (Translated and annotated with an introduction by Charles Christopher Mierow with the collaboration of Richard Emery) (2004). Columbia University Press. ISBN 978-0-231-13419-4.
- The Hungarian Illuminated Chronicle: Chronica de Gestis Hungarorum (Edited by Dezső Dercsényi) (1970). Corvina, Taplinger Publishing. ISBN 978-0-8008-4015-0.
- The Two Cities: A Chronicle of Universal History to the Year 1146 A. D. by Otto, Bishop of Freising (Translated in full with Introduction and Notes by Charles Christopher Mierow, Ph.D., LL.D., President of Colorado College, Edited by Austin P. Evans and Charles Knapp) (1928). Columbia University Press.

=== Secondary sources ===
- Berend, Nora; Urbańczyk, Przemysław; Wiszewski, Przemysław (2013). Central Europe in the High Middle Ages: Bohemia, Hungary and Poland, c. 900-c. 1300. Cambridge University Press. ISBN 978-0-521-78156-5.
- Berry, Virginia G. (1969). "The Second Crusade". In Setton, Kenneth M.; Marshall, Baldwin W. (eds.). A History of the Crusades, Volume I: The First Hundred Years. The University of Wisconsin Press. pp. 463–512. ISBN 978-0-299-04834-1.
- Engel, Pál (2001). The Realm of St Stephen: A History of Medieval Hungary, 895–1526. I.B. Tauris Publishers. ISBN 978-1-86064-061-2.
- Font, Márta (2001). Koloman the Learned, King of Hungary (Supervised by Gyula Kristó, Translated by Monika Miklán). Márta Font (supported by the Publication Commission of the Faculty of Humanities of the University of Pécs). ISBN 978-963-482-521-0.
- Makk, Ferenc (1989). The Árpáds and the Comneni: Political Relations between Hungary and Byzantium in the 12th century (Translated by György Novák). Akadémiai Kiadó. ISBN 978-963-05-5268-4.
- Makk, Ferenc (1994). "Borisz". In Kristó, Gyula; Engel, Pál; Makk, Ferenc (eds.). Korai magyar történeti lexikon (9–14. század) [Encyclopedia of the Early Hungarian History (9th–14th centuries)] (in Hungarian). Akadémiai Kiadó. pp. 120–121. ISBN 978-963-05-6722-0.
