= László Mezey =

László Mezey (5 December 1918 – 14 April 1984) was a Hungarian medievalist and palaeographer.

Mezey was a student of the paleographer István Hajnal, completing the appendix on charter copies of Hajnal's monograph on the medieval universities and script development.
