= Euphemia of Kiev =

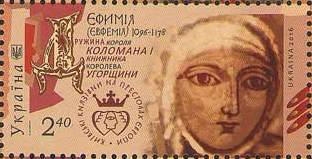
- Euphemia on a Ukrainian stamp
- Born: Kiev, Kievan Rus' (now Ukraine)
- Died: 4 April 1139; Kiev
- Spouse: Coloman, King of Hungary (divorced)
- Issue: Boris
- House: Monomakhovichi
- Father: Vladimir II Monomakh
- Mother: Unknown (Vladimir's second wife)

Evfimiya Vladimirovna (Ukrainian: Євфимія Володимирівна, Russian: Евфимия Владимировна), known as Euphemia of Kiev (fl. 1112–died 4 April 1138) was Queen Consort of Hungary by marriage to Coloman, King of Hungary.

Euphemia was the daughter of Grand Prince Vladimir II Monomakh of Kiev and his second wife, whose name and ancestry are unknown. She was married to King Coloman of Hungary around 1112, when she was noted as being a teenager. However, her husband, who had been suffering from a serious disease, caught her in adultery and immediately sent her back to Kiev. Euphemia gave birth to her son, Boris (1113 – 1155–1156), in her father's court, but the son was never recognised by King Coloman. Afterwards, she lived in a monastery near Kiev till her death, maintaining high status and respect despite the circumstances of her reputation. She was buried in the Church of the Holy Savior in Berestovo (which is within present-day Kiev).

== Sources ==
- Soltész, István: Árpád-házi királynék (Gabo, 1999)
- Kristó, Gyula – Makk, Ferenc: Az Árpád-ház uralkodói (IPC Könyvek, 1996)

Euphemia of Kiev Monomakhovichi Born: ? Died: 1139
Royal titles
Preceded by Felicia of Sicily	Queen consort of Hungary c. 1112–c. 1113	Succeeded by Unnamed daughter of Robert I of Capua
