= Bibliotheca Corviniana =

Hungarian library in Buda (1460–1526)

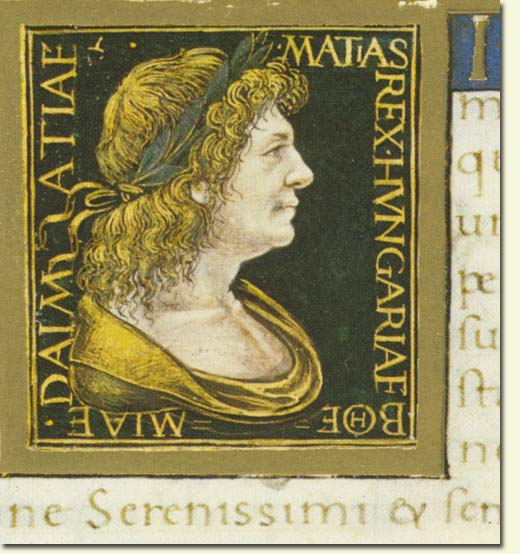
Matthias Corvinus, King of Hungary

Bibliotheca Corviniana or Corvina Library was one of the most renowned libraries of the Renaissance world in Buda Castle, established by Matthias Corvinus, King of Hungary (1458–1490). The books were taken to Istanbul after the Hungarian defeat by the Ottomans at the Battle of Mohács in 1526.

== History ==
Matthias, one of the most powerful rulers of the age, started to collect the books from about 1460. At the king's death in 1490, the library consisted of about 3,000 codices or "Corvinae" which included about four to five thousand various works, many of classical Greek and Latin authors. It represented the literary production and reflected the state of knowledge and arts of the Renaissance and included works of philosophy, theology, history, law, literature, geography, natural sciences, medicine, architecture, and many others. The codices moved to Istanbul after the Turkish conquest of Hungary in the 16th century. Only about 216 Corvinae survived, today preserved in several libraries in Hungary and Europe.

North of the Alps, Matthias's library was the largest in Europe, and its vast contents was only second to the Vatican Library in the whole of Europe, according to contemporary accounts. It was the greatest collection of science writings in its time. In 1489, Bartolomeo della Fonte of Florence wrote that Lorenzo de Medici founded his own Greek-Latin library encouraged by the example of the Hungarian king.

Nearly two-thirds of the surviving volumes had not been printed before the king's death. Some of them contained the sole copy of the works in them, like the book of Constantine Porphyrogennetos on the habits in the court of the Byzantine emperor, or the church history of Nikephoros Kallistos. Some lost Corvinae works are also known, with which the only copy of ancient books perished, including the full works of Hypereides, and writings by Flavius Cresconius Corippus, Procopius, as well as by Matthias's contemporary Cuspinianus.

Hungary's National Széchényi Library is working on projects to restore the Corvina library in digital form.

Items from the Bibliotheca Corviniana were inscribed on UNESCO’s Memory of the World Register in 2005 in recognition of their historical significance.

== Gallery ==
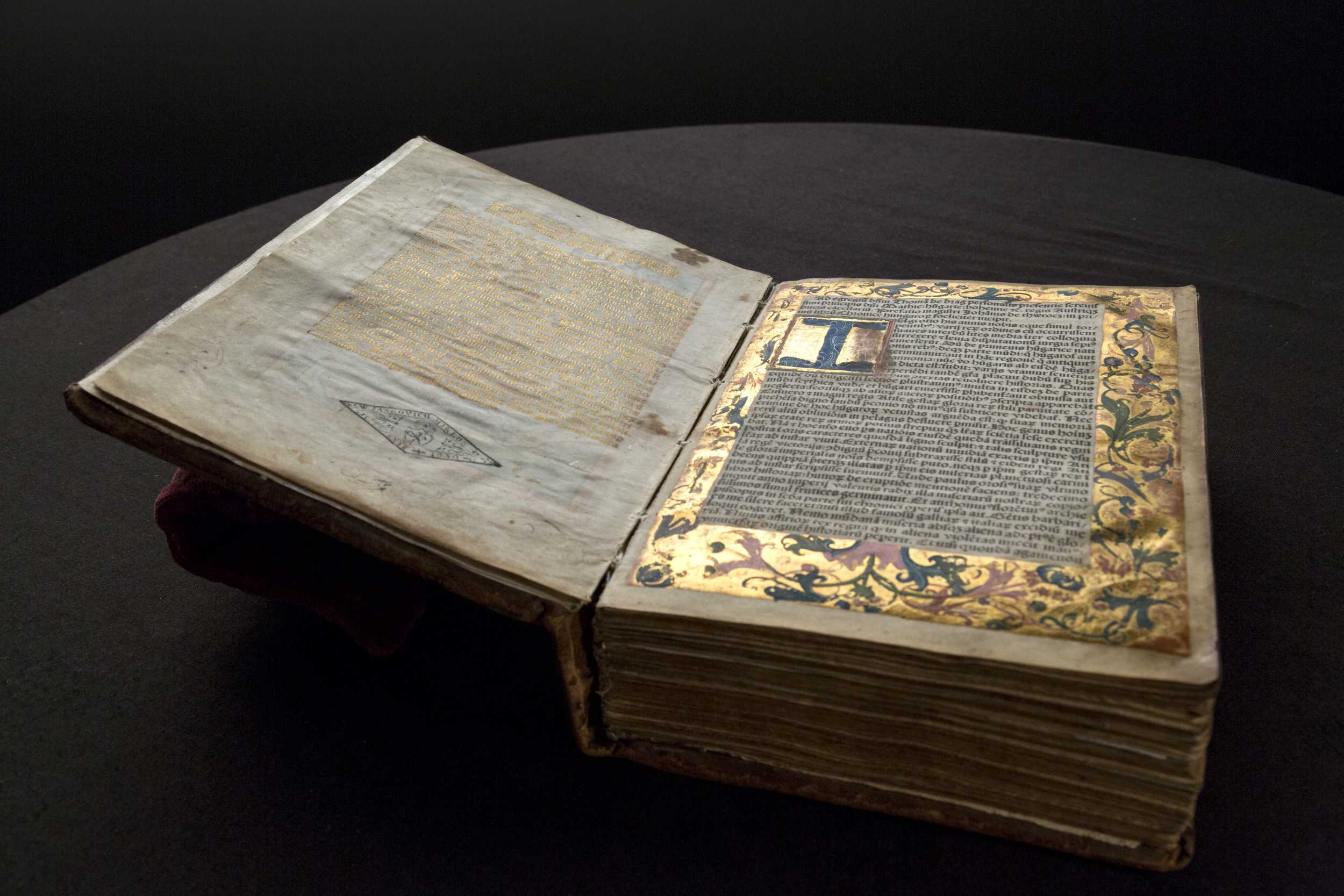
The editor's preface was adorned with gilded letters in one version of the Augsburg edition of the Chronica Hungarorum by Johannes Thuróczy from 1488. For the first time in history, gold paint was used for this print.

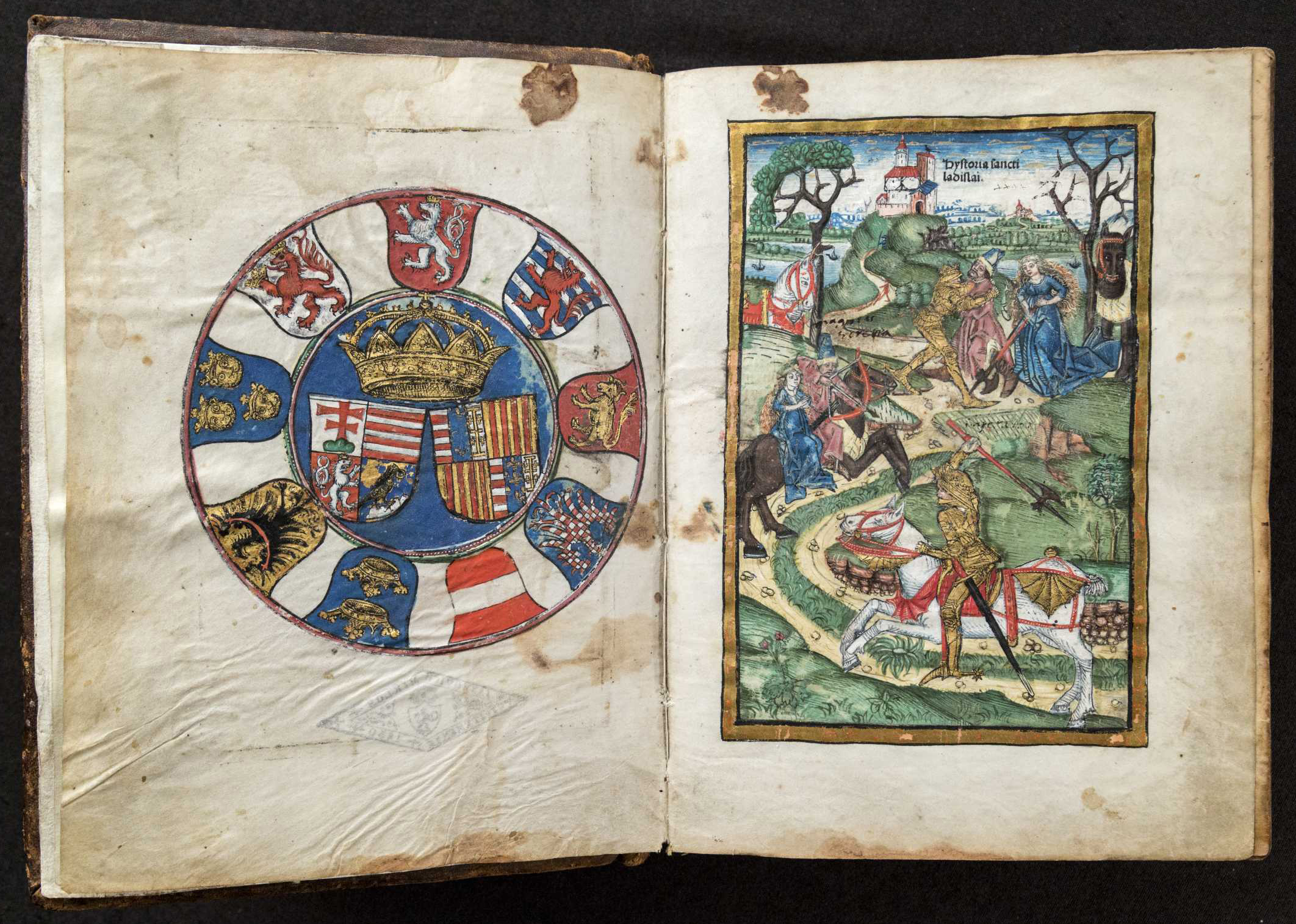
The first page of one version of the Augsburg edition of the Chronica Hungarorum by Johannes Thuróczy from 1488, also known as the Thuróczy Chronicle.

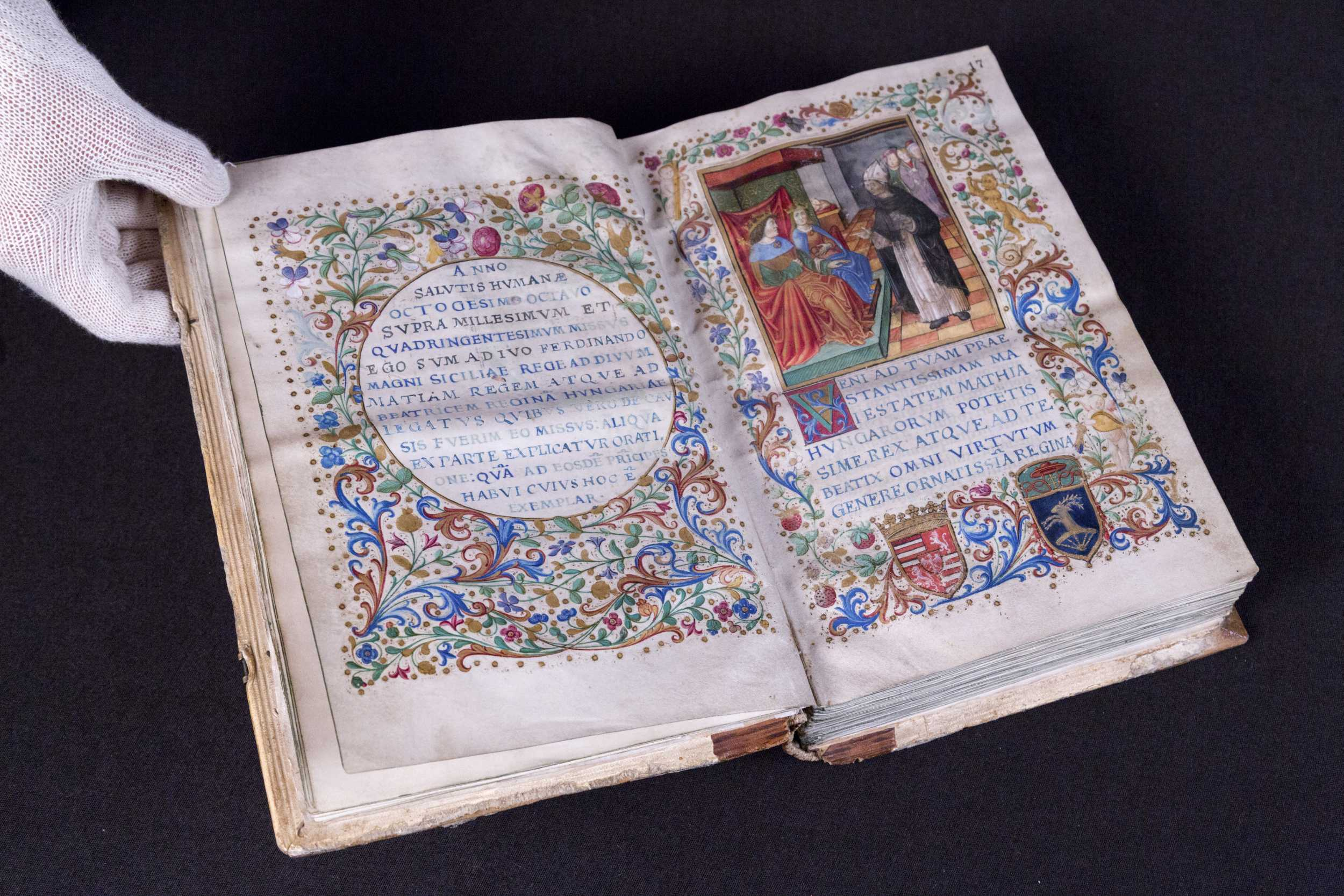
Epitome rerum Hungarorum by Pietro Ranzano from 1490.

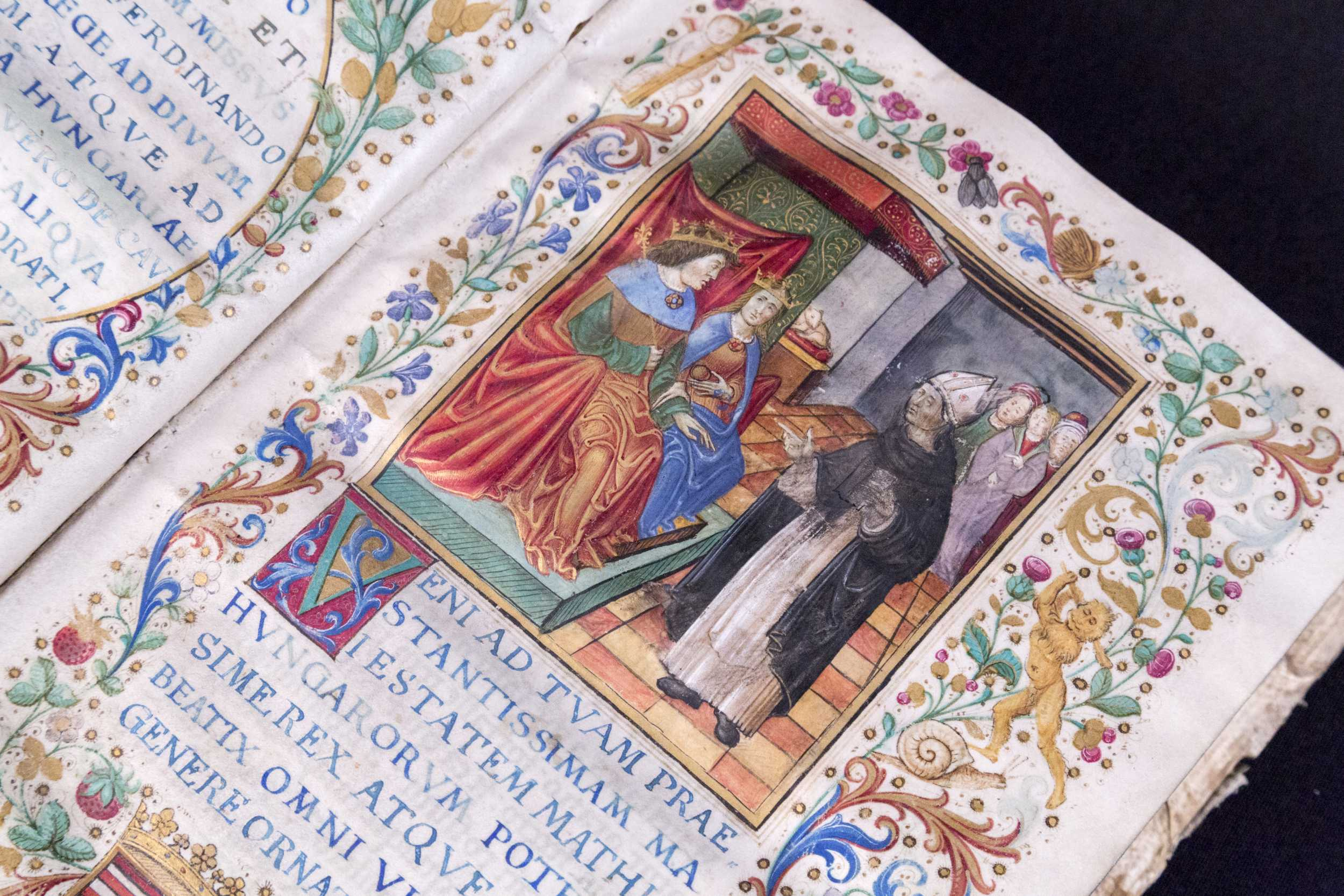
Italian humanist, Pietro Ranzano before King Matthias Corvinus and Queen Beatrice in the Epitome rerum Hungarorum.

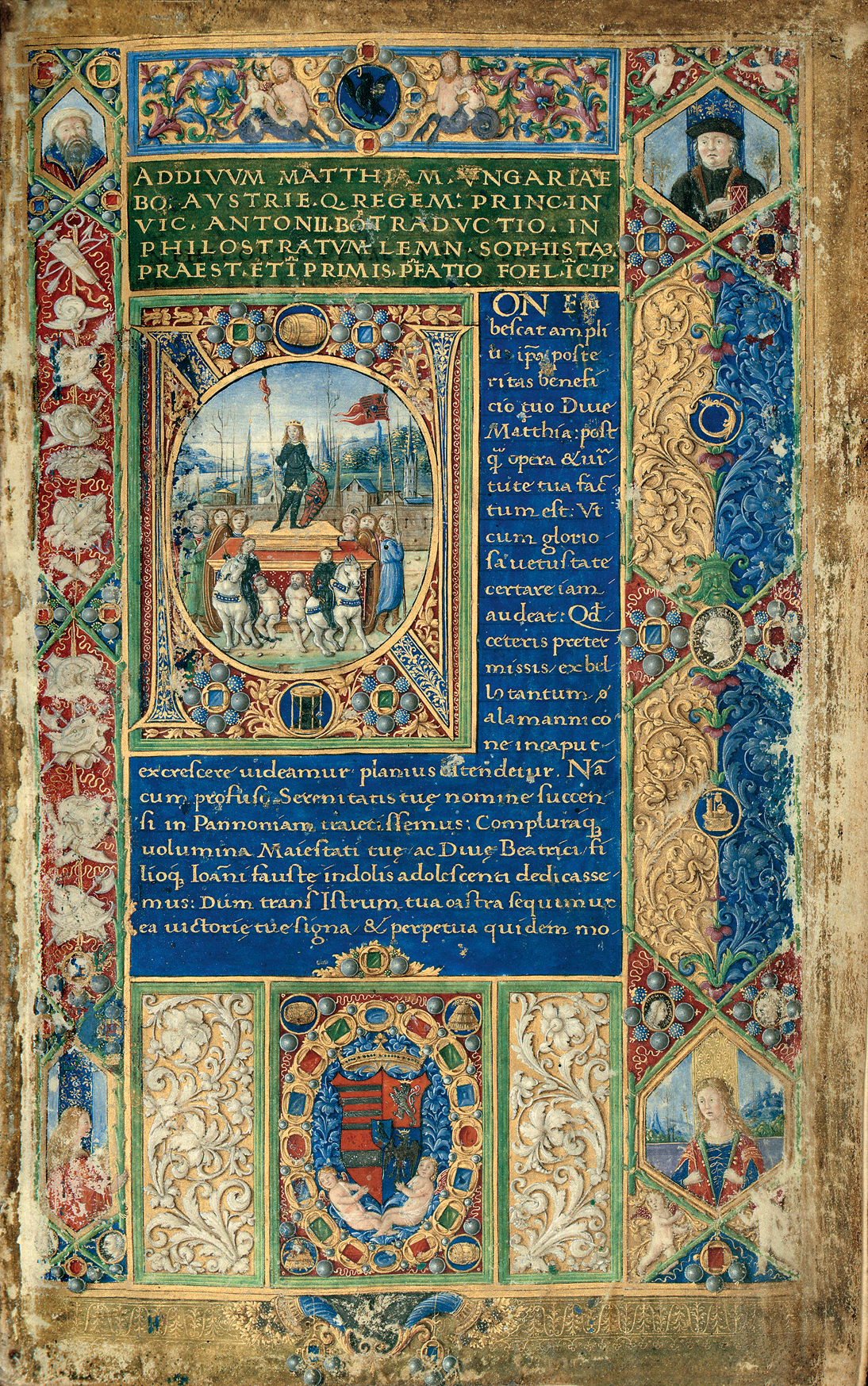
Philostratus codex

== Books from the Corvina Library ==
- Libellus de virtutibus Matthiae Corvino dedicatus (Latin for "A Little Book of Virtues dedicated to Matthias Corvinus", 1467)
- Chronica Hungarorum - Buda Chronicle (Latin for "Chronicle of the Hungarians", 1473)
- Chronica Hungarorum - Thuróczy Chronicle (Latin for "Chronicle of the Hungarians", 1488)
- Epitome rerum Hungarorum (Latin for "A Brief Summary of the History of the Hungarians", 1490)
- Rerum Hungaricarum decades (Latin for "Decades of Hungarian History" 1497)

== See also ==
- List of libraries in Hungary
