= Agostino da Siena (bishop) =

15th-century Roman Catholic bishop

Most Reverend Agostino da Siena
- Bishop of Montemarano
- Church: Catholic Church
- Diocese: Diocese of Montemarano
- In office: 1477–1484
- Predecessor: Ladislao Dentice
- Successor: Simeone Dantici

Personal details
- Died: 1484

Agostino da Siena, O.F.M. (died 1484) was a Roman Catholic prelate who served as Bishop of Montemarano (1477–1484).

== Biography ==
Agostino da Siena was ordained a priest in the Order of Friars Minor. On 24 Jan 1477, he was appointed during the papacy of Pope Sixtus IV as Bishop of Montemarano. He served as Bishop of Montemarano until his death in 1484.

== External links and additional sources ==
- Cheney, David M. "Diocese of Montemarano". Catholic-Hierarchy.org. (for Chronology of Bishops) ^{[self-published]}
- Chow, Gabriel. "Titular Episcopal See of Montemarano (Italy)". GCatholic.org. (for Chronology of Bishops) ^{[self-published]}

Catholic Church titles
Preceded by Ladislao Dentice	Bishop of Montemarano; 1477–1484	Succeeded by Simeone Dantici
