= Epitome rerum Hungaricarum =

15th-century Hungarian chronicle

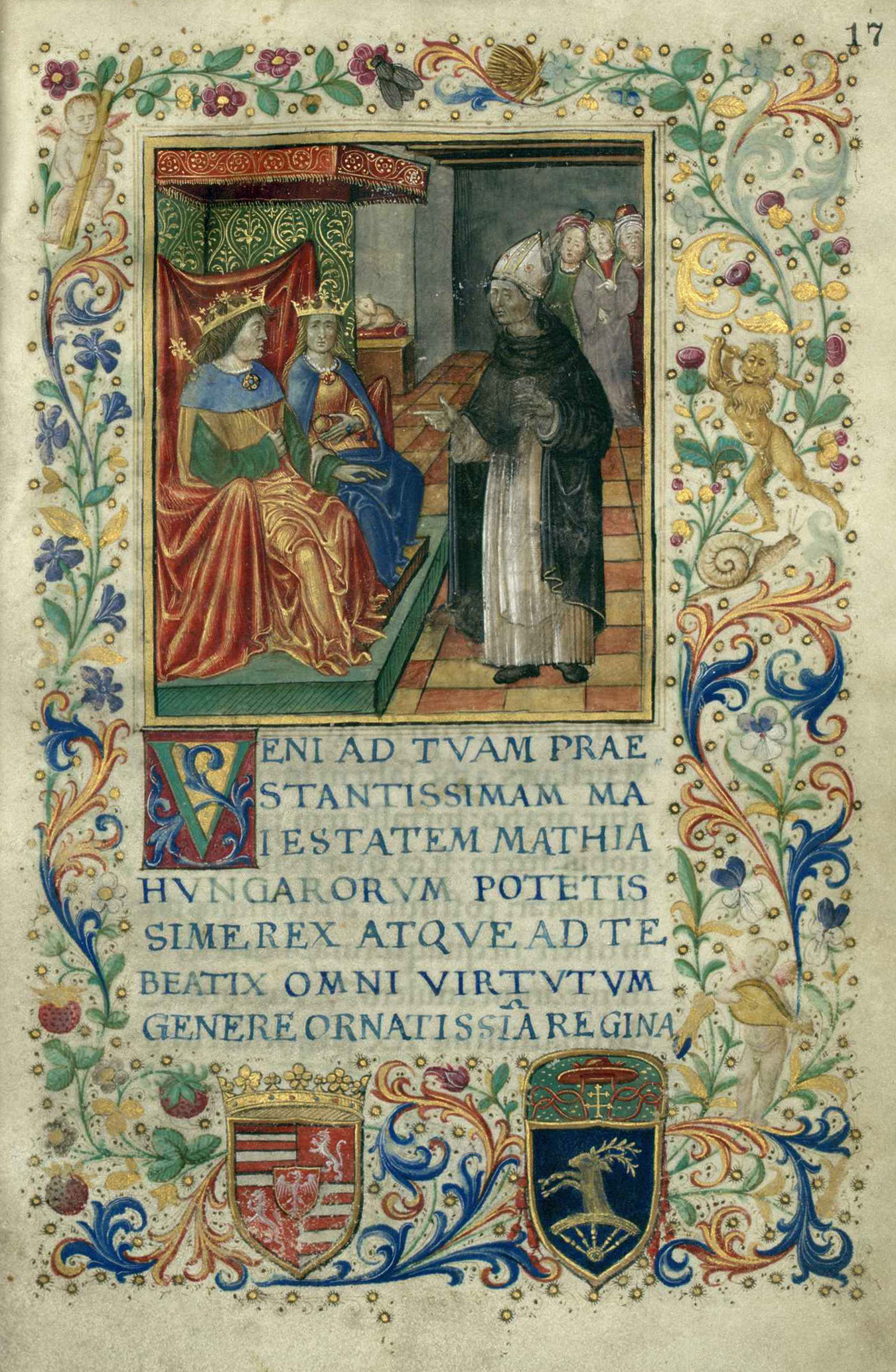
- Italian humanist, Pietro Ranzano before King Matthias Corvinus of Hungary and Queen Beatrice
- Author: Pietro Ranzano
- Language: Latin
- Subjects: History of the Hungarians
- Genre: Chronicle
- Published: 1490
- Publication place: Kingdom of Hungary

The Epitome rerum Hungaricarum (Note: Many editions, spellings: Epitome/Epitoma/Epithoma Hungarorum/Hungaricarum/Hungararum/Ungaricarum) (Latin for "A Brief Summary of the History of the Hungarians"; Hungarian: A magyarok történetének rövid foglalata) is a Latin medieval chronicle from the Kingdom of Hungary from 1490. The work was written by the Italian humanist, Bishop of Lucera, Pietro Ranzano (Latin: Petrus Ransanus) who was the envoy of the Kingdom of Naples at the court of King Matthias Corvinus of Hungary between 1488 and 1490. Queen Beatrice of Hungary commissioned him to write the history of Hungarians.

The Epitome rerum Hungarorum is the first Hungarian historical work with a humanist spirit.

== History of the chronicle ==
Pietro Ranzano stayed in the Kingdom of Hungary at the court of King Matthias Corvinus of Hungary between 1488 and 1490 as an envoy of the Kingdom of Naples as a confidant of the House of Aragon, where he tried to strengthen the position of Queen Beatrice, the daughter of King Ferdinand I of Naples.

Ranzano as a confidant of King Ferdinand I of Naples, already had a significant history as a historian. He wrote the life of several saints commissioned by the Pope. Between 1458 and 1460, Ranzano began his greatest undertaking, the writing of the Annales omnium temporum (Latin for "Annals of All Times"), he had 60 books ready when he went to the court of King Matthias Corvinus of Hungary. The high priest Ranzano's authority as a historiographer was raised not only by the already written books of the Annales, but also by his work on the life of John Hunyadi (De Ioanne Corvino), i.e. the development of the family's origin myth.

In the spring of 1488, the first edition of Johannes Thuróczy's Chronica Hungarorum was published. The Thuróczy Chronicle, which is medieval in its language and spirit and relies heavily on the earlier 14th-century chronicle compositions, no longer corresponded to the taste of the Renaissance, so it is possible that soon two Italian humanists, Pietro Ranzano and Antonio Bonfini were commissioned to process the Hungarian history in a humanistic style.

Pietro Ranzano was commissioned by Queen Beatrice to write the history of Hungarians based on the Chronica Hungarorum by Johannes Thuróczy, including the story of the Hunyadis. Ranzano started the Epitome rerum Hungarorum at the beginning of 1489, he finished his work before the death of King Matthias Corvinus (6 April 1490). In addition to extracting Thuróczy's text, he was the first to deal with the geographical description of Hungary in two independent source-based chapters. In addition to the Thuróczy Chronicle, he also used chancellery documents and oral reports, especially when presenting the period of King Matthias. Regarding Charles the Short and the early reign of Sigismund, Ranzano used the chronicles of Venetian diplomat Lorenzo de Monacis. He utilized the hagiographies of St. Stephen and St. Margaret too.

Ranzano started to correct his work, a fair copy intended for King Matthias was prepared from the first manuscript, but the king did not receive it due to his death. In the fall of 1490 after the end of his embassy, when Ranzano returned to Italy, he left the original manuscript in Hungary and he took the revised copy with him to Palermo. He incorporated this material into his enormous work, the Annales omnium temporum. The fair copy from Hungary has been lost, although the autograph manuscript of the Annales has survived, this is now in Palermo. In the book of 61 of the Annales, the truncated Epitome rerum Hungarorum is survived, only with its revised text until the story of 1456.

Ranzano's Hungarian history was first published in 1558 under the supervision of János Zsámboky, a scholarly Hungarian humanist who achieved timeless merits with his publishing work. Based on the first (now lost) manuscript, printer Lukács Pécsi published the chronicle in 1579 too.

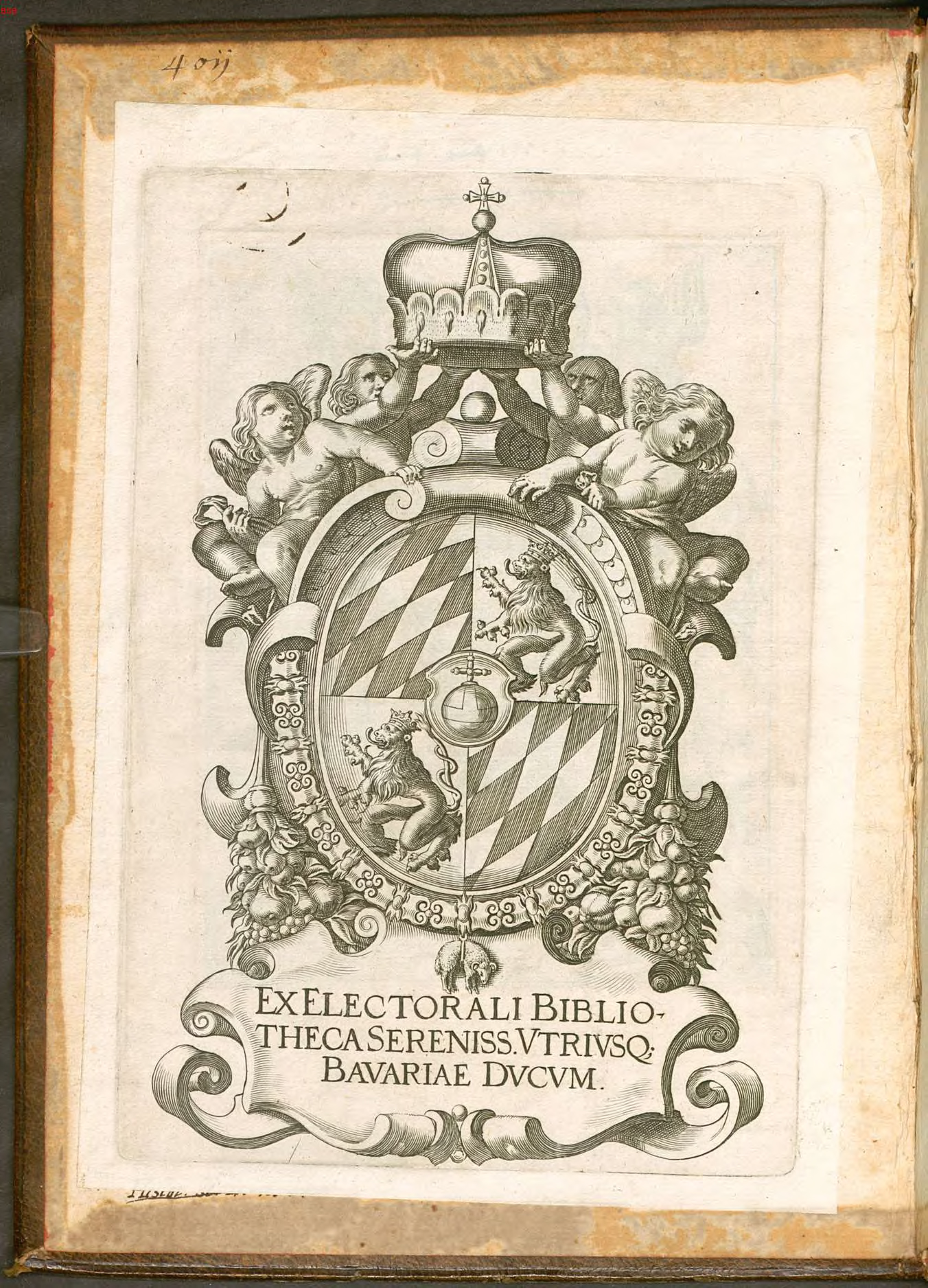

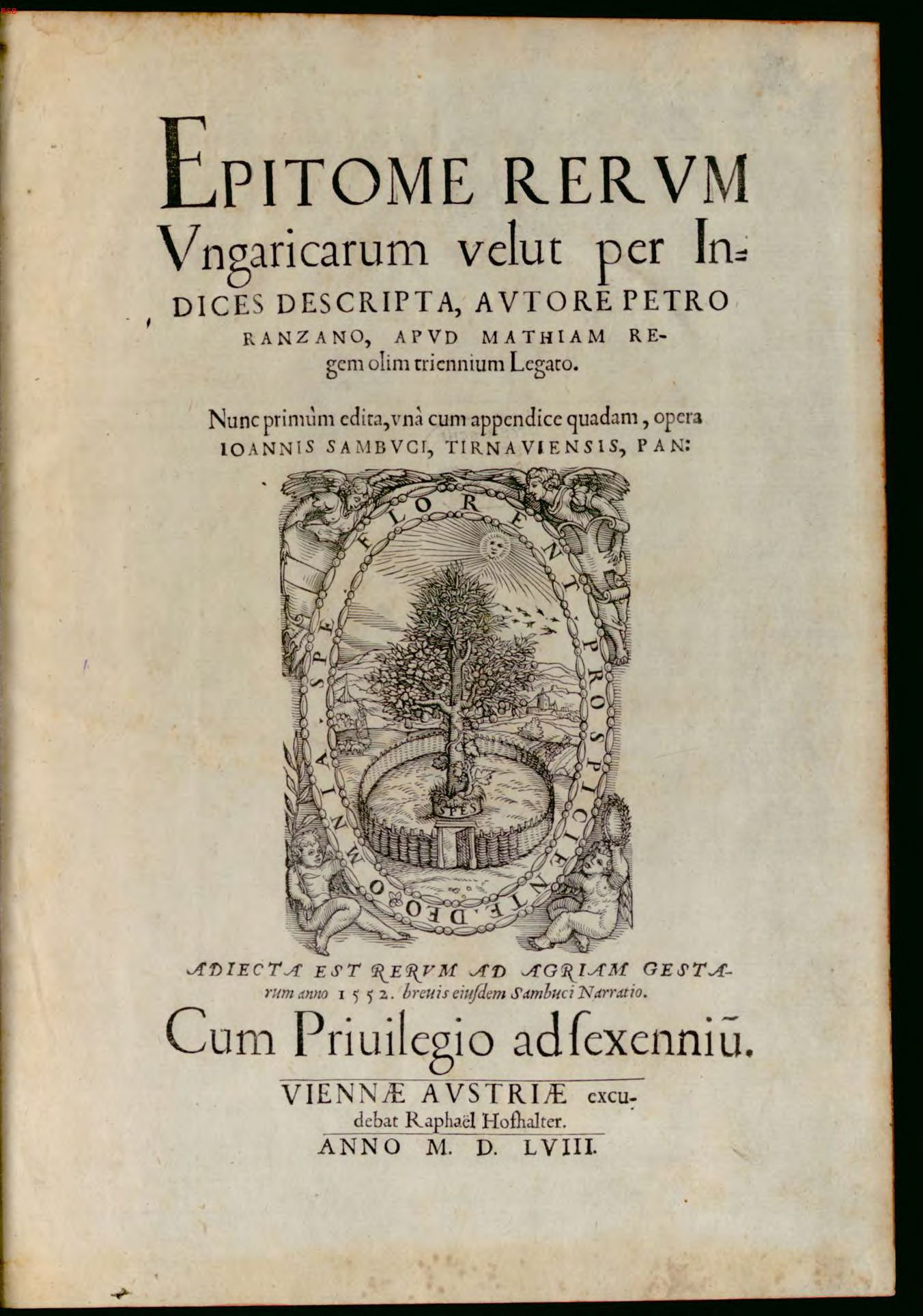

This codex is a decorated copy of Ranzano's work made for the famous Hungarian royal library of King Matthias Corvinus (Bibliotheca Corviniana). The core text was written in Buda in 1490. The title page reflects the period of transition, on the miniature King Matthias Corvinus and Queen Beatrice were depicted, the coat of arms on the bottom left is already of King Vladislaus II of Hungary who reigned from 1490 after the death of King Matthias. Ranzano took the uncompleted manuscript to Italy, and after his death, his nephew Johannes found it in Ranzano's legacy. Johannes added a new preface and in 1513, gifted the manuscript to the Hungarian archbishop, Tamás Bakócz who was at that time in Rome on the papal election. This is the reason why the coat of arms of Bakócz is presented on the title page on the bottom right. Later, the manuscript became property of Péter Révay and then property of the Thurzó family. Palatine of Hungary, György Thurzó had it bound in Pozsony (now Bratislava, Slovakia) before 1611. When Thurzó's daughter Ilona married Gáspár Illésházy, the book became a treasure of the Illéshézy library in Dubnic. Probably, Samuel Litteráti Nemes, a smart artwork trader contributed to that the book got out of that library between 1806 and 1832. Miklós Jankovich purchased the book from Literati Nemes, and then it entered the Hungarian National Library together with Jankovich's collection. Today, the Ransanus codex is in the Hungarian National Library under shelfmark Cod. Lat. 249, the corvina is currently covered by a white full leather binding featuring German Renaissance style decoration.

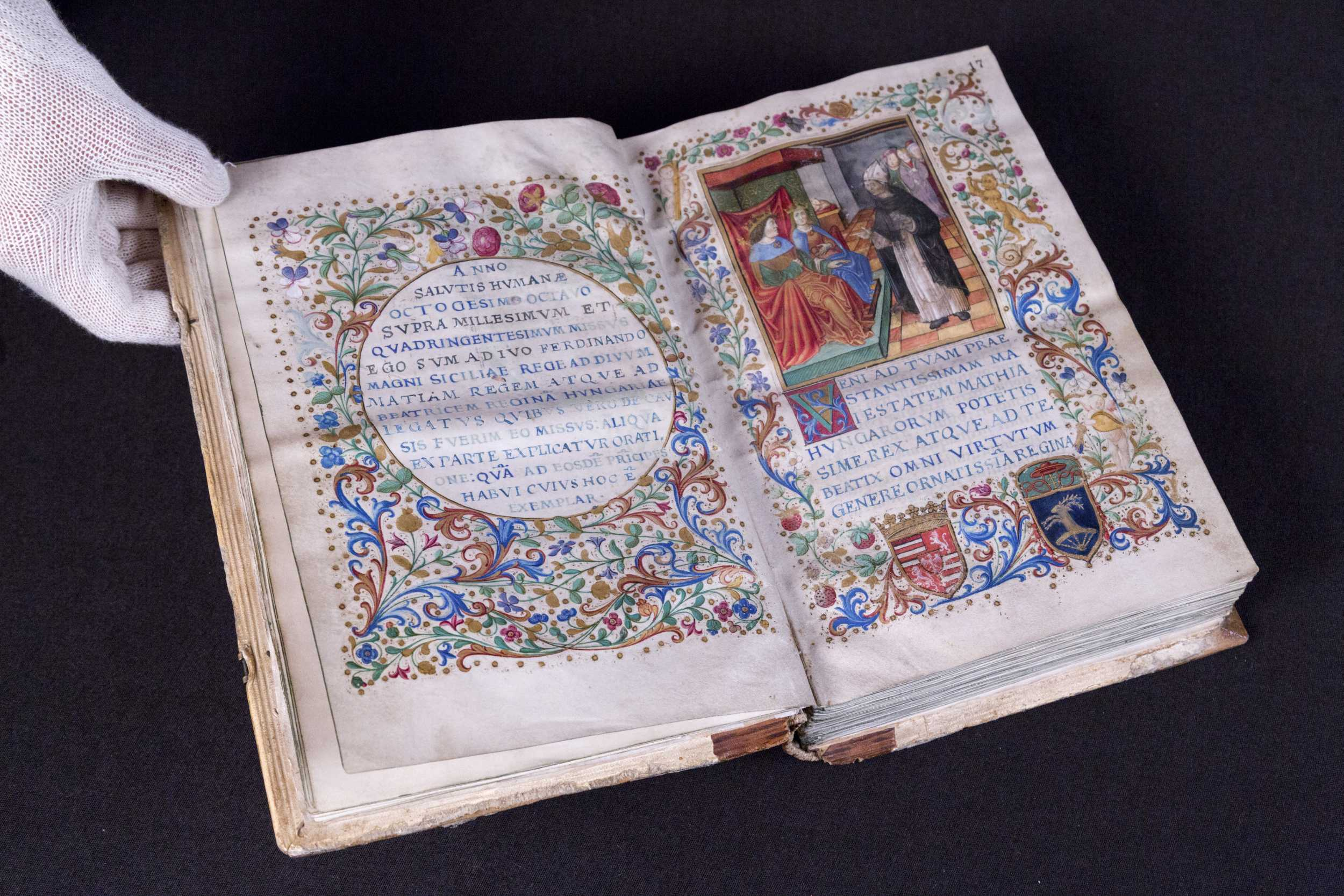

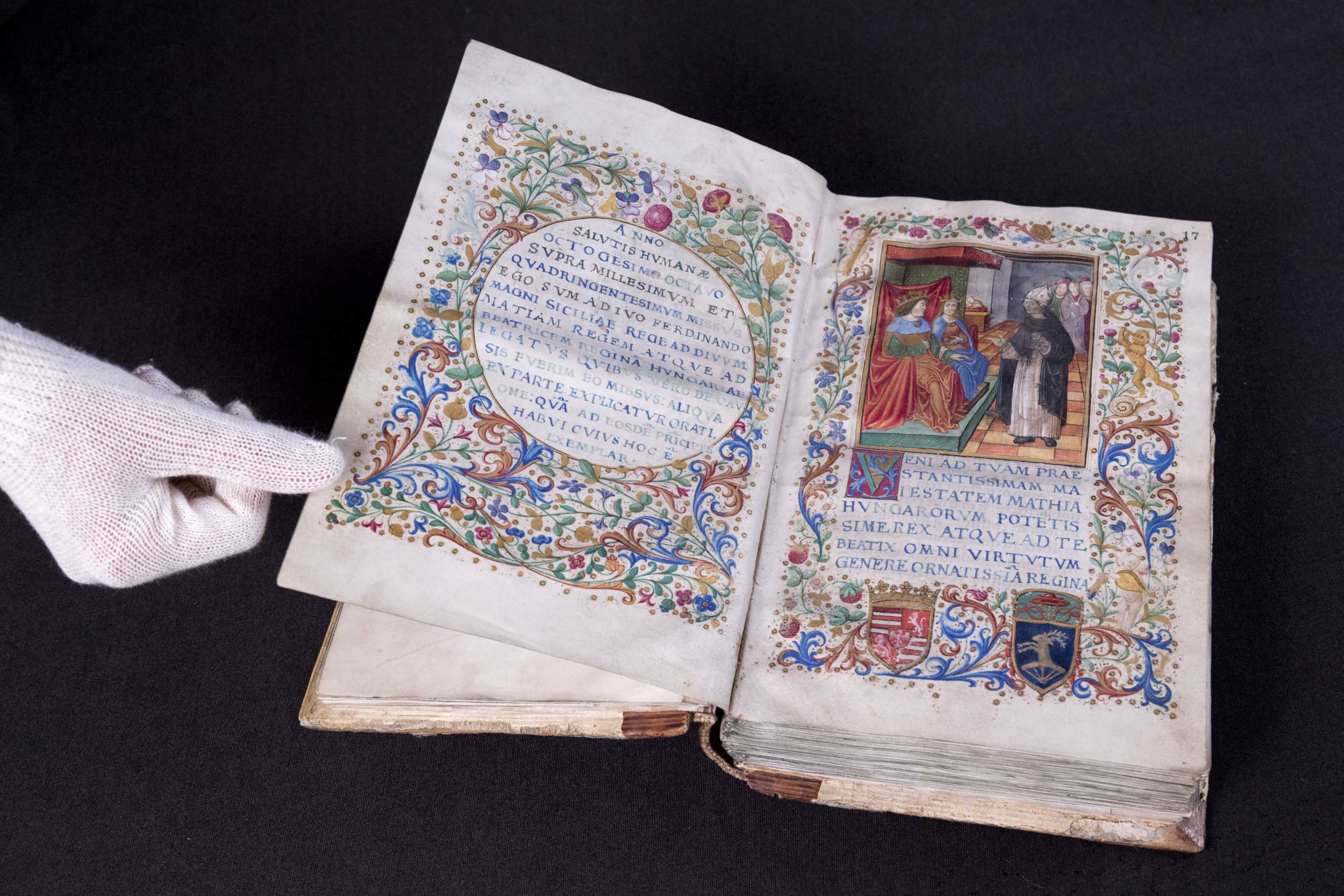

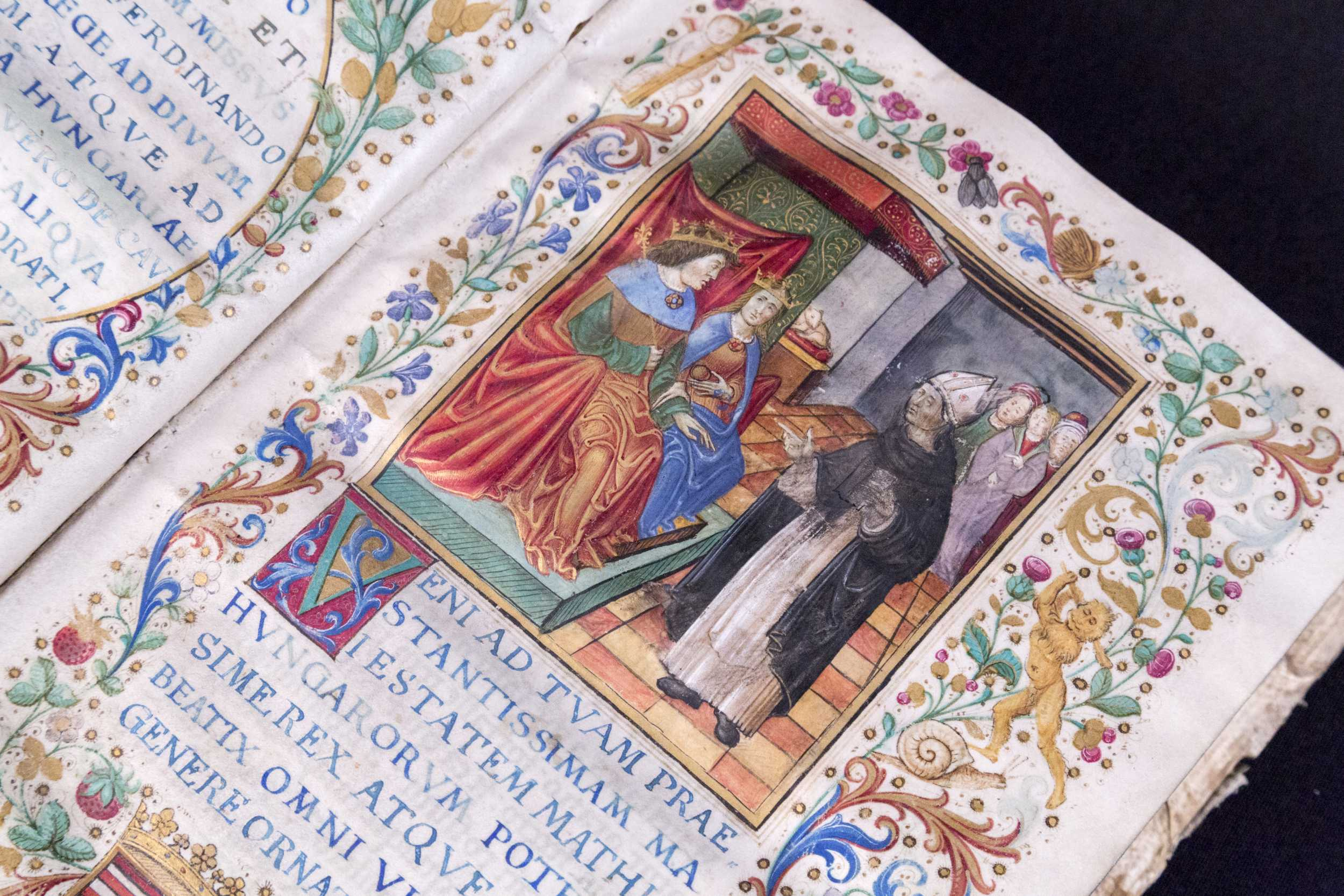

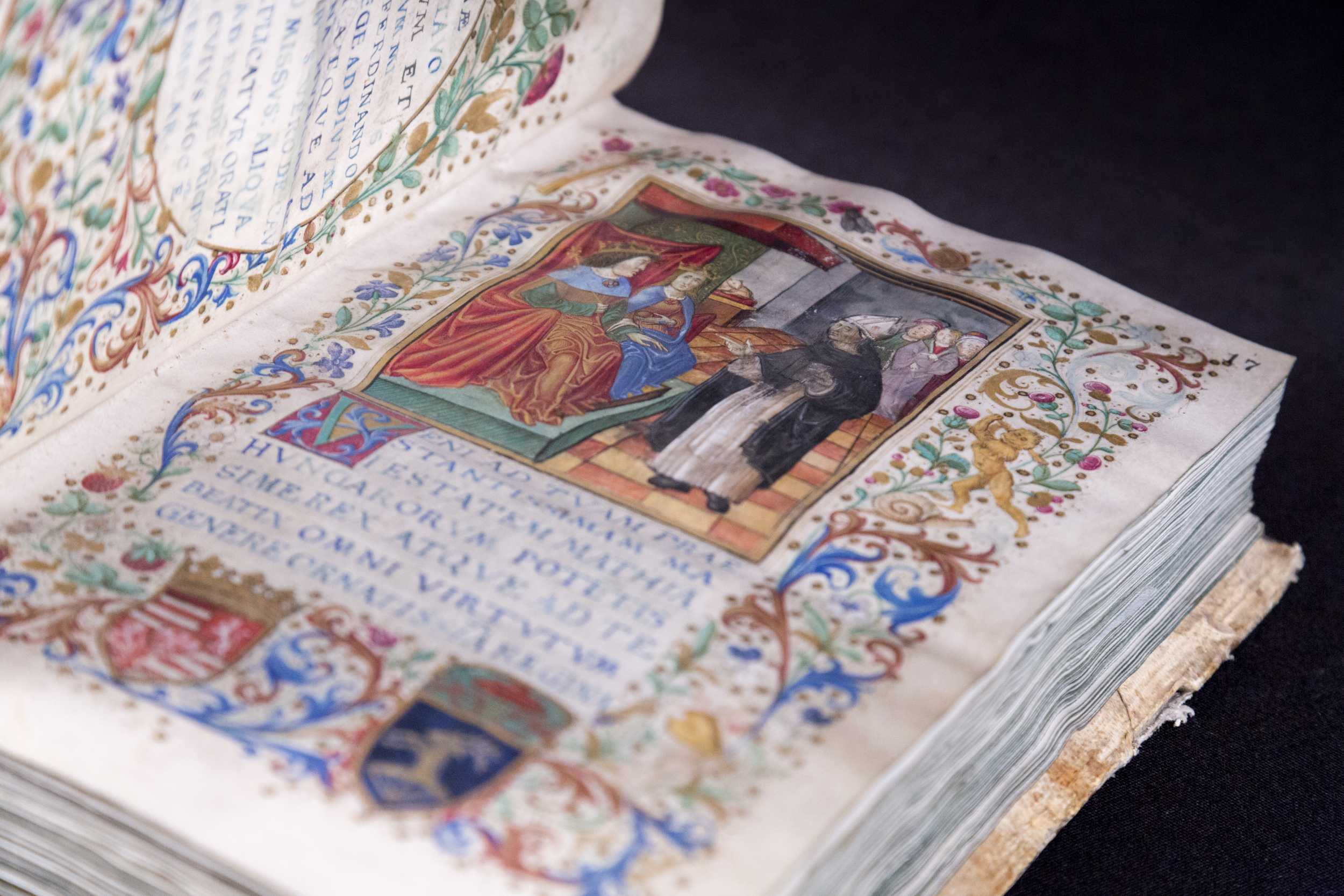

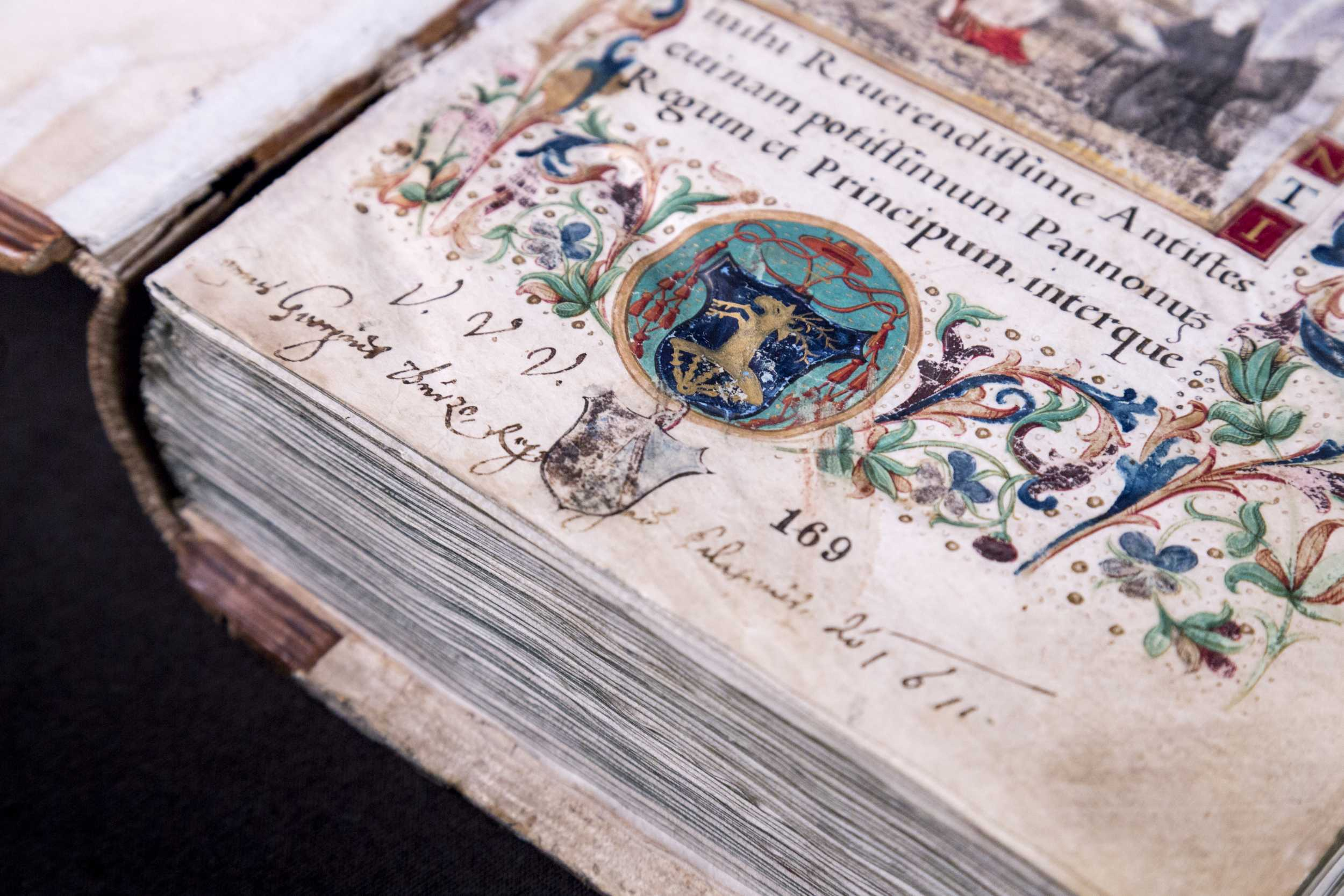

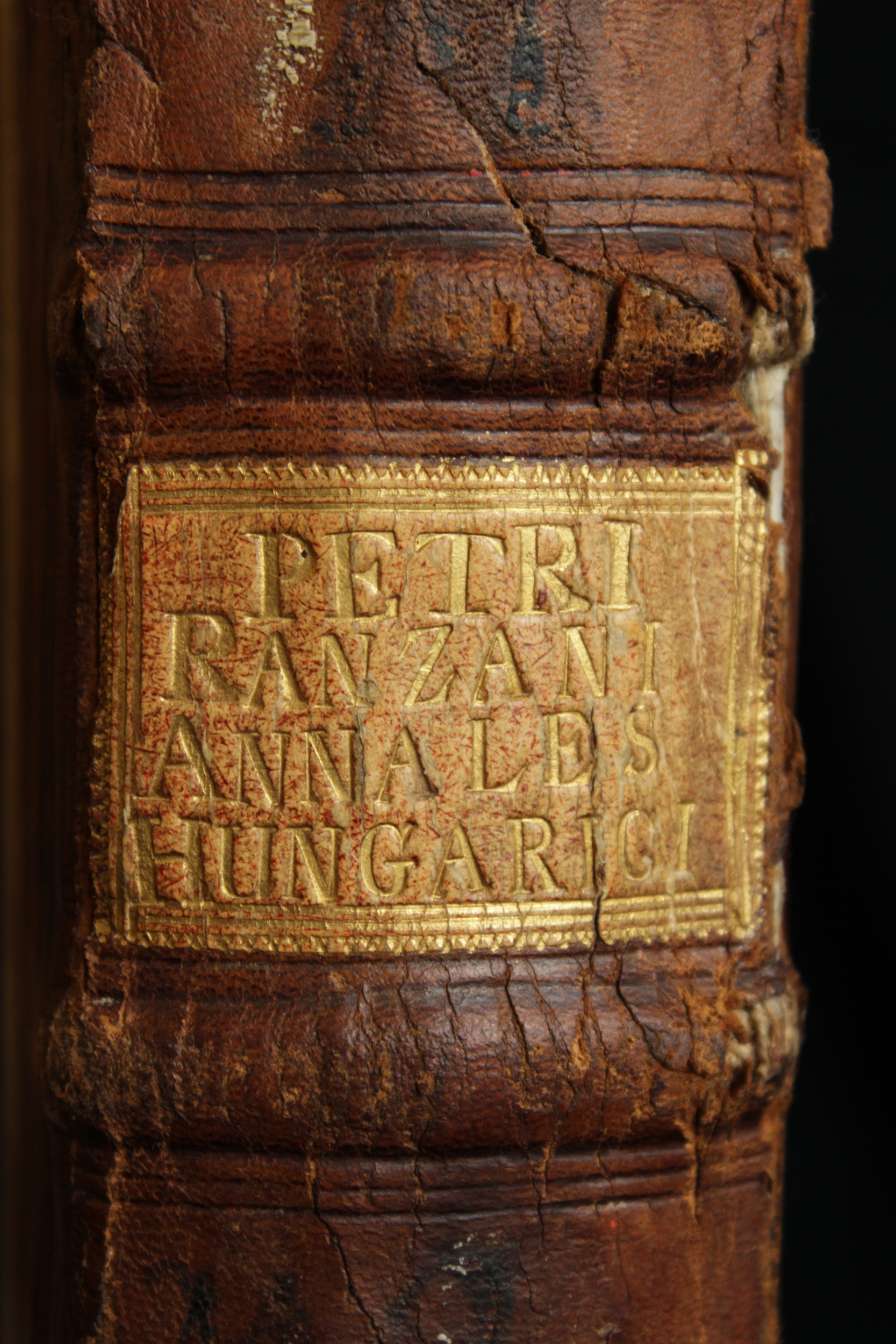

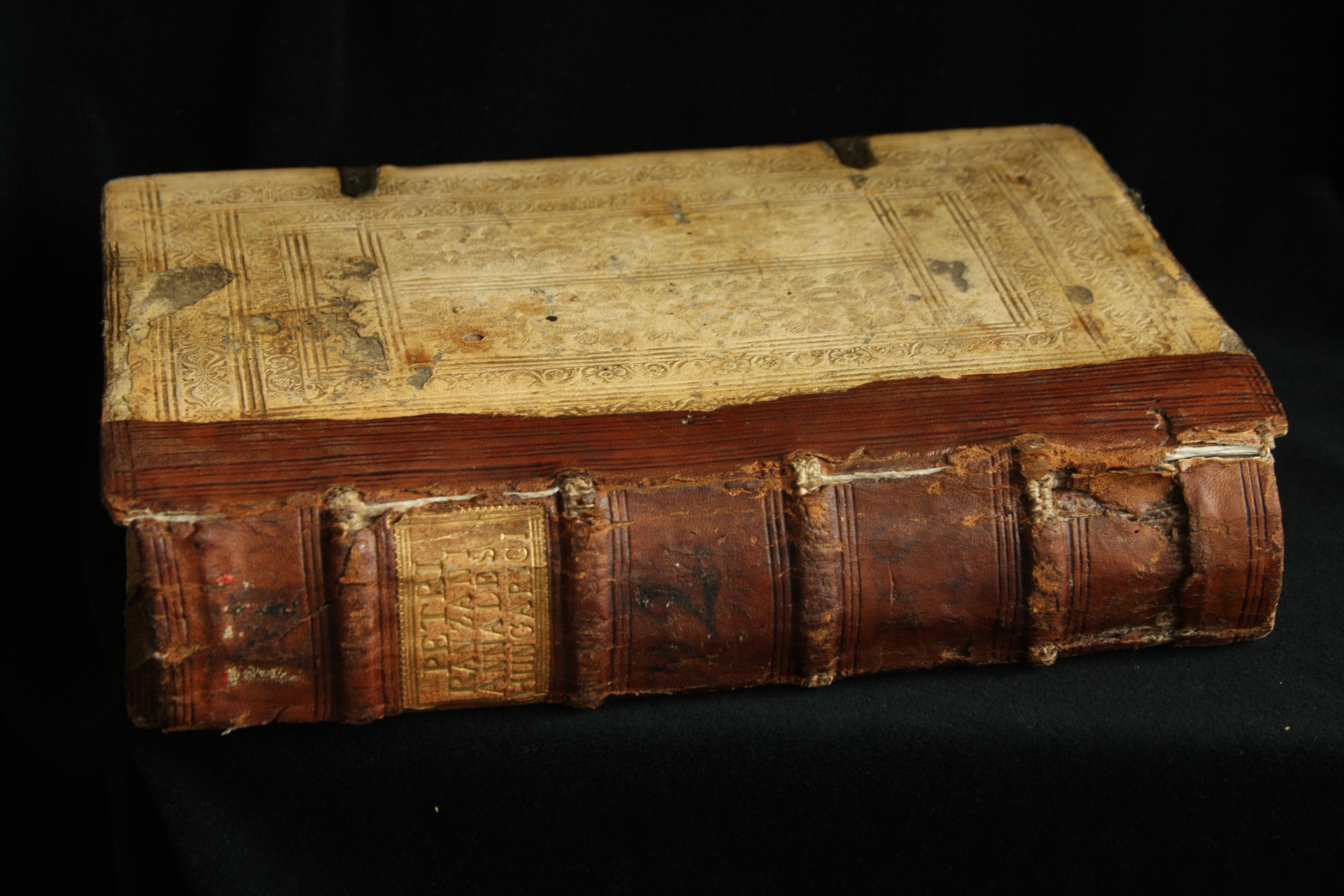

== The chronicle ==
=== Historical content ===
As the title suggests, the "Brief Summary of the History of the Hungarians" does not include a detailed, humanistic revision of the entire history of Hungary. The historical part as a whole "has no real original source value", according to historians László Blazovich and Erzsébet Sz. Galántai. At the beginning of his historical work, Ranzano delivers an oratory speech to the royal couple, Matthias and Beatrice, depicting the royal portraiture, ruler virtues, morals and qualities of Matthias. The author develops the Corvinus' origin myth, claiming that the king descends from that Roman gens named Corvinus, who were settled by Constantine the Great to Dacia in the 4th century. Accordingly, the first Corvinus was granted the river island "Corvina" on the Danube. Ranzano derives the name from Kovin (present-day in Serbia). In addition to the characterization of Matthias, Ranzano praises the king's son John Corvinus on the occasion of his proposed wedding with Bianca Maria Sforza. In his oratory speech, Ranzano refers to the works of Aristotle and Cicero, beside the segments of the Bible.

The basic premise of the Hungarian medieval chronicle tradition that the Huns, i.e. the Hungarians coming out twice from Scythia, the guiding principle was the Hun-Hungarian continuity. However, instead of continuity, Ranzano writes about the more distant kinship and relationship of the two peoples, contrary to the Hungarian chronicles. According to Ranzano, the Sarmatians came out of their homeland in 744 headed by a leader named "Hungar". Nevertheless, Ranzano is quite inconsistent when he talks about the origin of the Hungarians. In one chapter, the Hungarians appear as descendants of the Pannonians, while in another their origin can be traced back to Japheth. Based on a work of a certain French author Elinius, Ranzano claims that the Hungarians' original homeland laid near the then-existing Grand Duchy of Moscow and its ruler Ivan III bore the title "dux Hungariae". The Epitome rerum Hungarorum rewrote the events of the Hungarian conquest, and except for the year, nothing resembles to the Thuróczy Chronicle. Ranzano is the first chronicler, who calls the ancient Hungarian ruling dynasty after Árpád, the leader of the Hungarians during the conquest; the chronicler says that Taksony descended from the lineage of ("de genere") Árpád.

Ranzano compares the political role of Géza and Stephen I (father and son) with John Hunyadi and Matthias Corvinus (also father and son): Géza was determined to convert the Hungarians, while Hunyadi fought against the pagan Ottomans. Both of them became founders of a royal house. Ranzano neglects the negative image of Géza is sometimes emphasized in the Hungarian chronicles. Matthias is compared to St. Stephen, the first king of Hungary. The chronicler emphasizes that Stephen was elected king through the people's choice (similarly to Matthias), downplaying the importance of his sacred coronation.

=== Geographical content ===
In addition to the extraction of the Chronica Hungarorum, Ranzano inserted two geographically themed chapters into his work. Historians consider this section is the "most valuable" part of the Epitome. Its text was also utilized by Antonio Bonfini in his monumental chronicle, the Rerum Hungaricarum decades. Ranzano collects the narrations of geographers and historians – for instance, Herodotus, Strabo and Appian – from Classical antiquity regarding Pannonia. Thereafter, the chronicler gives a general description of the surrounding land. It is clear from the text that he knew the Danube region with great precision, providing the names settlements along the river in the appropriate order. He also gives relatively accurate measurements of the distances between the settlements. Ranzano tells a detailed story about each of them, often relying on oral tradition (the phonetic transcription of the names of the settlements can be detected, which proves this method of work). He also traveled throughout the country to collect data, for instance he visited Upper Hungary. He provides much less detailed data on parts of the country far from the main trade routes (e.g. the Great Hungarian Plain or Transylvania).

Ranzano lists the counties of the Kingdom of Hungary, setting their number at approximately 57 (despite that, he only gives the names of 56). The chronicler frees himself by writing "I know very well that there are several counties that I left out against my will, because although I searched diligently, I still could not find anyone who would have listed them all for me." He makes mistakes during the enumeration, for instance, he places Transylvania as a whole province among the counties and writes about non-existent Báta and Zenng (Senj) counties. His work attests that the best-known area for the royal court was Transdanubia, Upper Hungary (today mostly Slovakia) and Northeast Hungary, and even in the center of public administration, knowledge about the remote parts of the country was incomplete.

The Italian chronicler also writes down his social history observations. He mentions the fourfold structure of Hungarian society (barons, clergy, soldiers, peasants). While Thuróczy emphasizes the principle of "one nobility with the same legal status", Ranzano separates the barons (the most powerful subjects of Matthias) from the Hungarian nobility. Ranzano realizes the small number of burghers (guild craftsmen and merchants) most of whom are Germans. In addition to them, Ranzano mentions only the group of "Slavons" as a separate ethnicity who live alongside the Hungarians. In the historical part, he also makes a short digression regarding the history of the Székelys. Ranzano covers the mining of precious metals in Northern Hungary, salt trade, salt mining and wine regions throughout the realm. He also lists the fortified castles and the richest growing regions. He says that there are "dragon bones" all over Transylvania. According to him, the most important trade cities were Pest, Kassa (today Košice, Slovakia) and Pécs at the time of the compilation of his work. The Epitome was also an important source for presenting the late 15th-century church administration in Hungary. He lists 13 episcopal seats, eight bishops by name, in addition to numerous monasteries (primarily Pannonhalma Archabbey) and provostries (e.g. Óbuda). Ranzano describes Hungary as "a land rich in precious metals, rocks, and fertile land" and etymologically derives the name "Pannonia" from Pandion of the Greek mythology. He links the names of many cities to Roman ancestors (for instance, Sopron is named after the Sempronia gens). Beside that, Ranzano considers the name of Ung (today Uzhhorod, Ukraine) or Hainburg originate from the Huns.

== See also ==
- List of Hungarian chronicles
- Gesta Hungarorum
- Gesta Hunnorum et Hungarorum
- Chronicon Pictum
- Buda Chronicle
- Chronica Hungarorum
- Nádasdy Mausoleum
