= Rerum Hungaricarum decades =

15th-century historical medieval chronicle from the Kingdom of Hungary

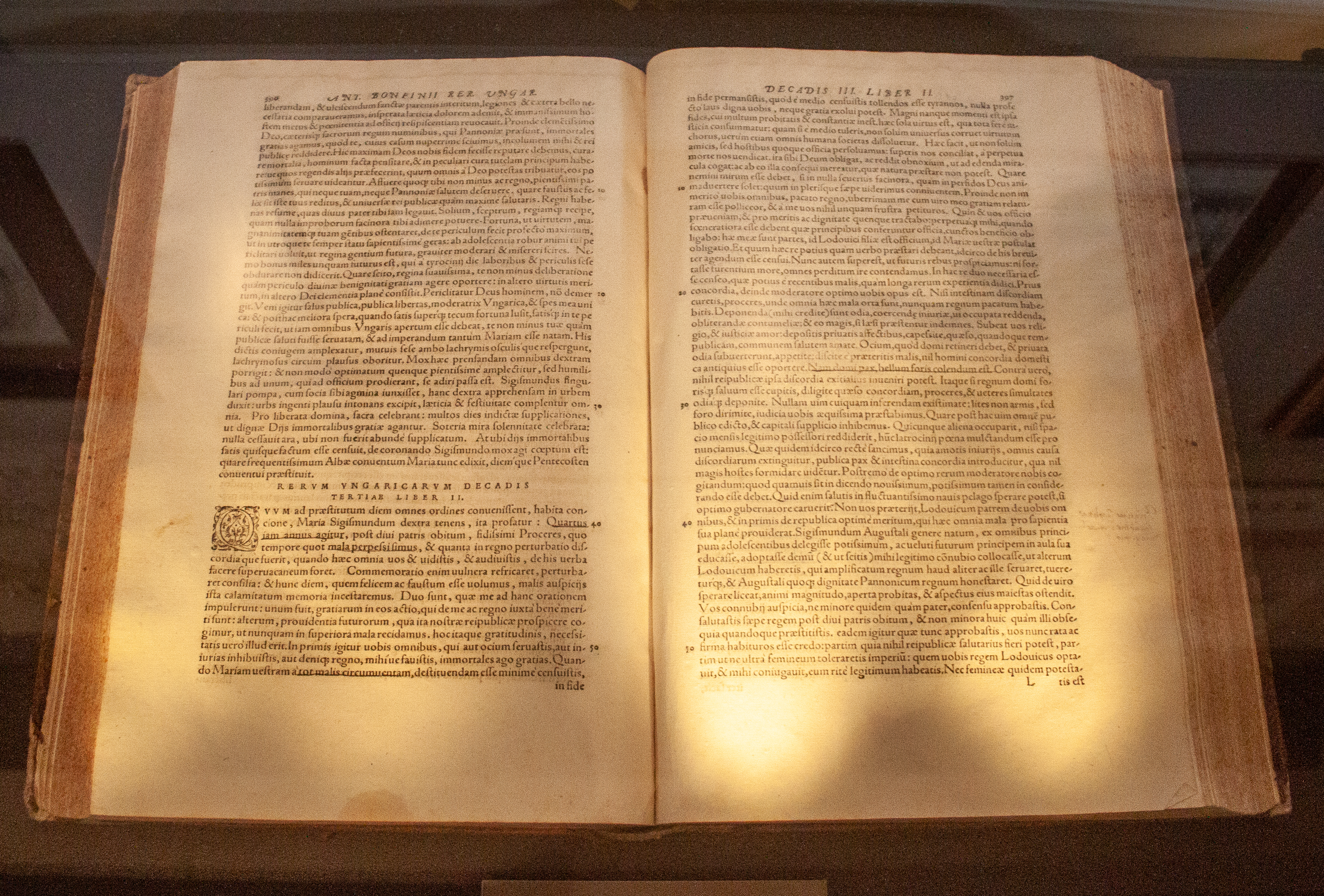
- Printed version of Rerum Hungaricarum decades from 1568
- Author: Antonio Bonfini
- Original title: Rerum Hungaricarum decades
- Language: Latin
- Subjects: History of the Hungarians
- Genre: Chronicle
- Published: 1497
- Publication place: Kingdom of Hungary

The Rerum Hungaricarum decades (Latin for "Decades of Hungarian History") (Hungarian: A magyar történelem tizedei) is a Latin medieval chronicle from the Kingdom of Hungary from 1497. The work was written by the Italian humanist, Antonio Bonfini (Latin: Antonius Bonfinius) who was commissioned by King Matthias Corvinus of Hungary in 1488.

Antonio Bonfini (1427–1502) made an invaluable contribution to Hungarian historiography with his work, which was considered the principal source on the subject in European academic circles until the late 1700s.

== History of the chronicle ==
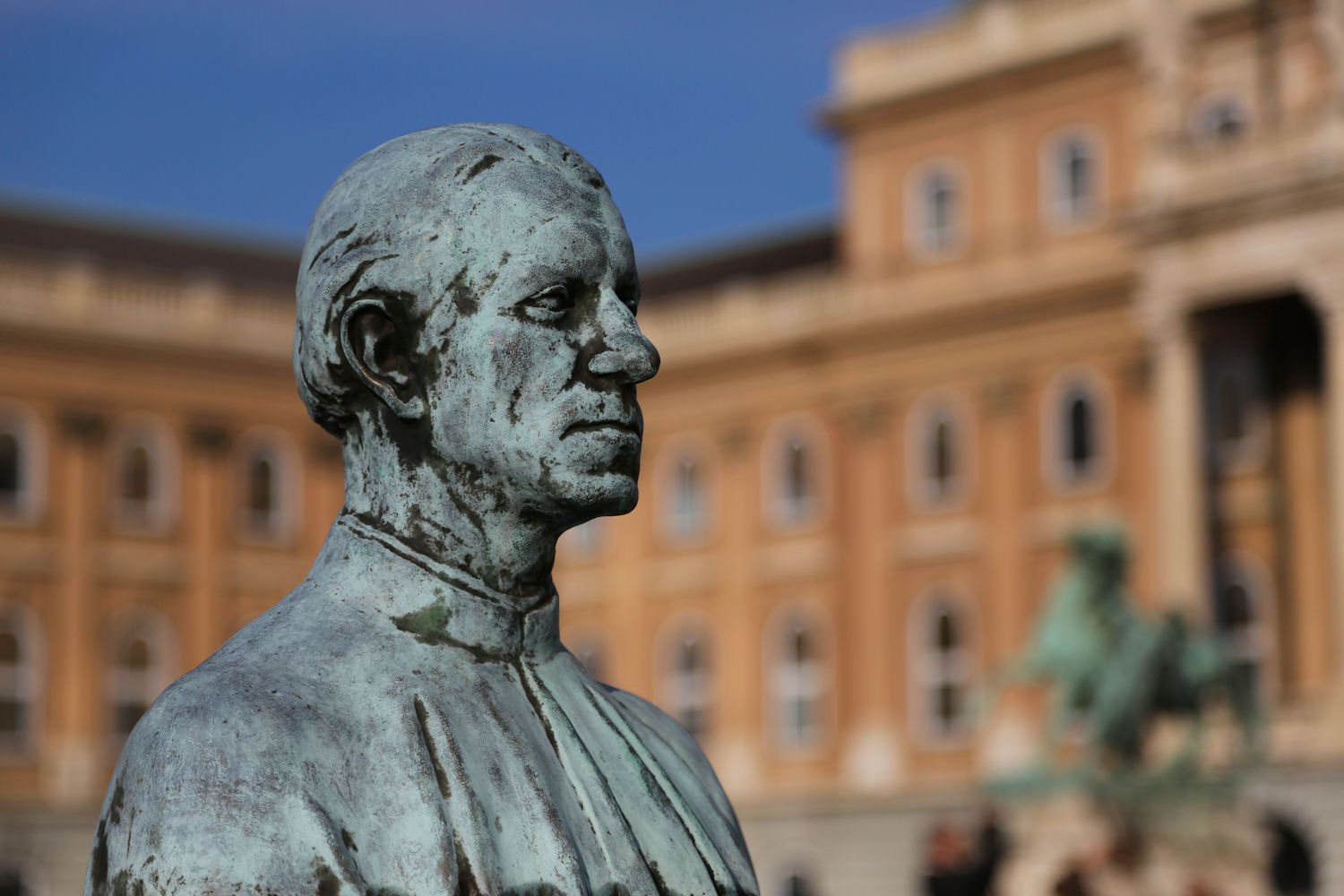
Statue of Bonfini in the Buda Castle in Budapest

The Italian humanist Bonfini arrived at the court of King Matthias Corvinus in 1486. The Hungarian king entrusted him with a great literary project in 1488. After the death of Matthias, his successor, Vladislaus II, also recognized the importance of the work, allowing Bonfini to continue it intermittently until 1497. According to financial records of Vladislaus II, by 1494–95 the manuscript was nearing completion. These records include purchases of parchment for clean copies intended for the Corvina Library, and payments to Master Johannes, the scribe. By the end of the 15th century, the work was completed and added to the Corvina Library.

Throughout the 16th century, several excerpts were copied, and at least one complete copy produced by multiple scribes is known to have existed. However, a printed edition of the entire work did not appear until 1568. The fate of the original Corvina codex remains a mystery, as its complete manuscript has been lost for centuries. Today, only three fragments are known: the first reached the Hungarian National Library in 1872, the second in 1923, and the third in 1975. It is believed that the full Bonfini Corvina consisted of four volumes, totaling over two thousand pages. Due to the limited surviving decoration, little is known about its original title page. Scholars speculate that, had the work been completed during the lifetime of King Matthias, it would have received lavish decoration and binding, similar to that of the Philostratus Corvina. Instead, the financial difficulties during the reign of King Vladislaus II and the decline of the Buda workshop resulted in a more modest presentation.

== See also ==
- List of Hungarian chronicles
- Gesta Hungarorum
- Gesta Hunnorum et Hungarorum
- Chronicon Pictum
- Chronica Hungarorum
- Epitome rerum Hungarorum
- Nádasdy Mausoleum

== Sources ==
- Császár, Mihály (1902). A magyar művelödés a XV. században: Antonio Bonfini Rerum hungaricum decades-ének alapján [Hungarian Culture in The 15th Century Based on Anthony Bonfini's Rerum Hungaricarum Decades] (Doctoral thesis) (in Hungarian). Budapest: Szent-István-Társulat.
