= Ladislao Dentice =

Italian Roman Catholic prelate

Most Reverend Ladislao Dentice
- Bishop of Montemarano; Bishop of Lucera
- Church: Catholic Church
- In office: 1465–1476
- Predecessor: Marino da Monopoli
- Successor: Agostino da Siena
- Previous post: Bishop of Lucera (1450–1465)

Personal details
- Born: 1427
- Died: 1476 (age 49) Lucera, Italy

Ladislao Dentice (1427–1476) was a Roman Catholic prelate who served as Bishop of Montemarano (1465–1476) and Bishop of Lucera (1450–1476).

== Biography ==
Ladislao Dentice was born in 1427. On 1 Jul 1450, he was appointed during the papacy of Pope Nicholas V as Bishop of Lucera. On 7 Oct 1465, he was appointed during the papacy of Pope Paul II as Bishop of Montemarano. He served as Bishop of Montemarano and Bishop of Lucera until his death in 1476.

== External links and additional sources ==
- Cheney, David M. "Diocese of Lucera-Troia". Catholic-Hierarchy.org. (for Chronology of Bishops) ^{[self-published]}
- Chow, Gabriel. "Diocese of Lucera-Troi (Italy)". GCatholic.org. (for Chronology of Bishops) ^{[self-published]}
- Cheney, David M. "Diocese of Montemarano". Catholic-Hierarchy.org. (for Chronology of Bishops) ^{[self-published]}
- Chow, Gabriel. "Titular Episcopal See of Montemarano (Italy)". GCatholic.org. (for Chronology of Bishops) ^{[self-published]}

Catholic Church titles
Preceded by	Bishop of Lucera; 1450–1476	Succeeded by Pietro Ranzano
Preceded by Marino da Monopoli	Bishop of Montemarano; 1465–1476	Succeeded by Agostino da Siena
