= Chronica Hungarorum =

15th-century Hungarian illustrated chronicle

Chronica Hungarorum – Thuróczy Chronicle
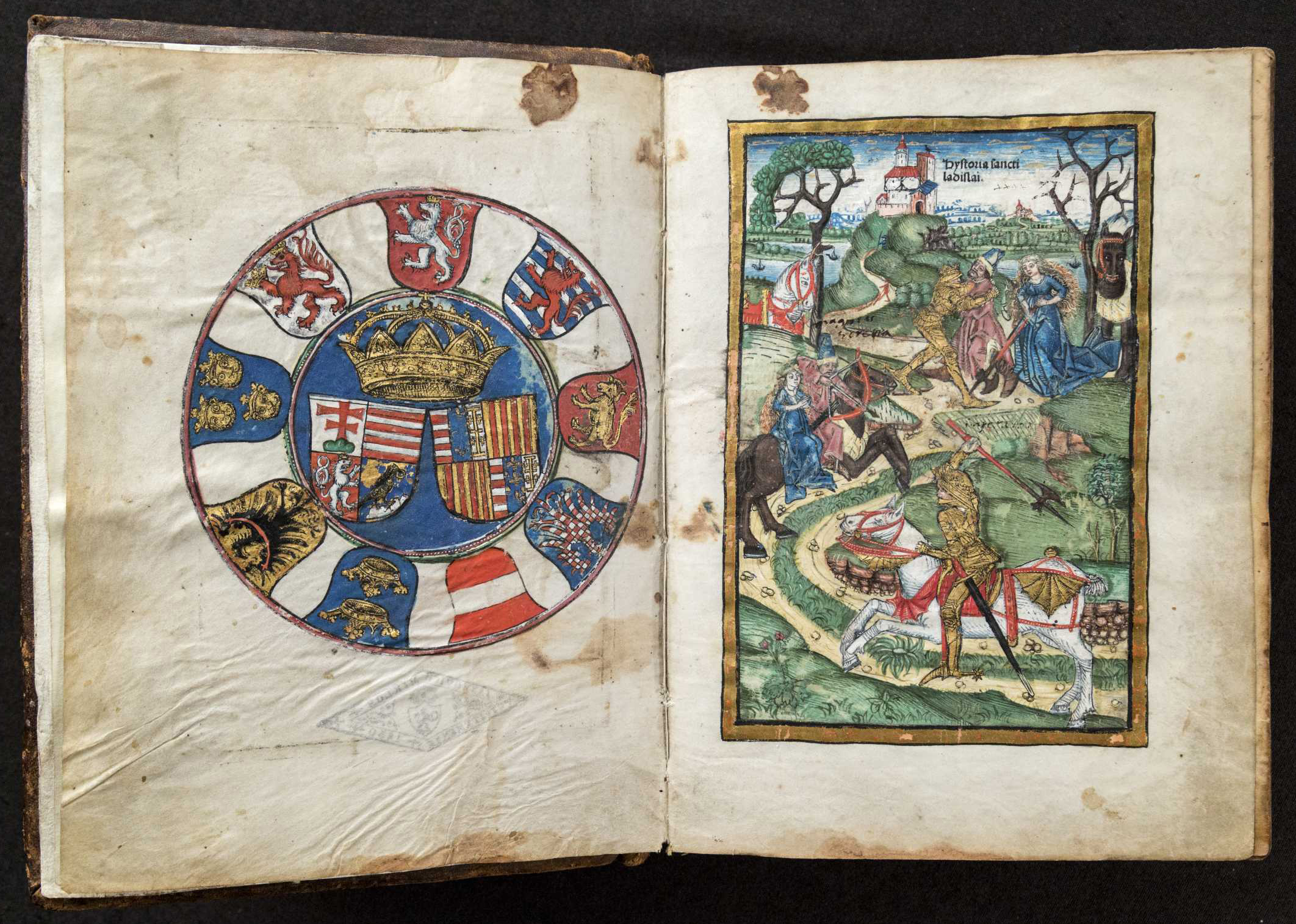
- The first page of one version of the Augsburg edition of the Chronica Hungarorum by Johannes Thuróczy from 1488, also known as the "Thuróczy Chronicle". For the first time in history, gold paint was used for this print. This edition is stored in the National Széchény Library in Budapest in Hungary.
- Author: Johannes Thuróczy
- Original title: Chronica Hungarorum
- Language: Latin
- Subjects: History of the Hungarians
- Genre: Chronicle
- Published: 1488
- Publication place: Kingdom of Hungary
- Media type: Print

Chronica Hungarorum (Latin for "Chronicle of the Hungarians") (Hungarian: A magyarok krónikája), also known as the Thuróczy Chronicle, is the title of a 15th-century Latin-language Hungarian chronicle written by Johannes Thuróczy by compiling several earlier works in 1488. It served as the primary source for the history of medieval Hungary for centuries.

== History ==
Johannes Thuróczy followed a career typical of contemporary legal scholars and, in the final years of his life, served as judge of the Court of the King's Personal Presence. Between the late 1480s and early 1490s, three Hungarian histories were written at the court of the Hungarian king, Matthias Corvinus: the Chronica Hungarorum by Johannes Thuróczy, the Epitome rerum Hungarorum by Pietro Ranzano and the Rerum Hungaricarum decades by Antonio Bonfini. The Thuróczy Chronicle was rooted in the tradition of the previous medieval Hungarian chronicle writing and it was the final work of its genre.

The chronicle recounts the history of the Hungarians from their origins up to the capture of Wiener Neustadt by King Matthias in 1487. The historical knowledge of future generations of people was based on the Thuróczy Chronicle, because it was the most complete medieval Hungarian history at that time. The chronicle itself was the result of a historiographical construction based on the predecessor Hungarian chronicles spanning previous centuries, beginning with the Ancient Gesta. According to Thuróczy, he worked from contemporary works of the time of King Charles I (1301–1342) and King Louis I (1342–1382), which also based on older chronicles. The basic premise of the Hungarian medieval chronicle tradition that the Huns, i.e. the Hungarians coming out twice from Scythia, the guiding principle was the Hun-Hungarian continuity.

No one doubts that the mother of the Huns, namely the Hungarians, was Scythia: Even at the beginning of their exodus from Scythia, the famous fighting virtue glowed in them, and now, in our day, their swords are flashing over the head of the enemy.

— Johannes Thuróczy: Chronica Hungarorum

King Matthias of Hungary was happy to be described as "the second Attila". In the prologue of his chronicle, Thuróczy set the goal of glorifying Attila, which was undeservedly neglected, moreover, he introduced the famous "Scourge of God" characterization to the later Hungarian writers, because the earlier chronicles remained hidden for a long time. Thuróczy worked hard to endear Attila, the Hun king with an effort far surpassing his predecessor chroniclers. He made Attila a model for his victorious ruler, King Matthias of Hungary (1458–1490) who had Attila's abilities, with this he almost brought "the hammer of the world" to life.

The chronicle was published in print twice in 1488, in Brno and in Augsburg. The Augsburg edition was published in two versions, the one dedicated to the German audience omitted the description of the Austrian campaign of King Matthias. Two ornate copies made for King Matthias of Hungary have been preserved. Both were printed on parchment, and the editor's preface was adorned with gilded letters. The Augsburg edition of the Chronica Hungarorum from 1488 is the first known print made with gold paint. The engravings in both volumes were hand-painted at the Hungarian royal court. The chronicle contains hand-colored woodcuts depicting 41 Hungarian kings and leaders.

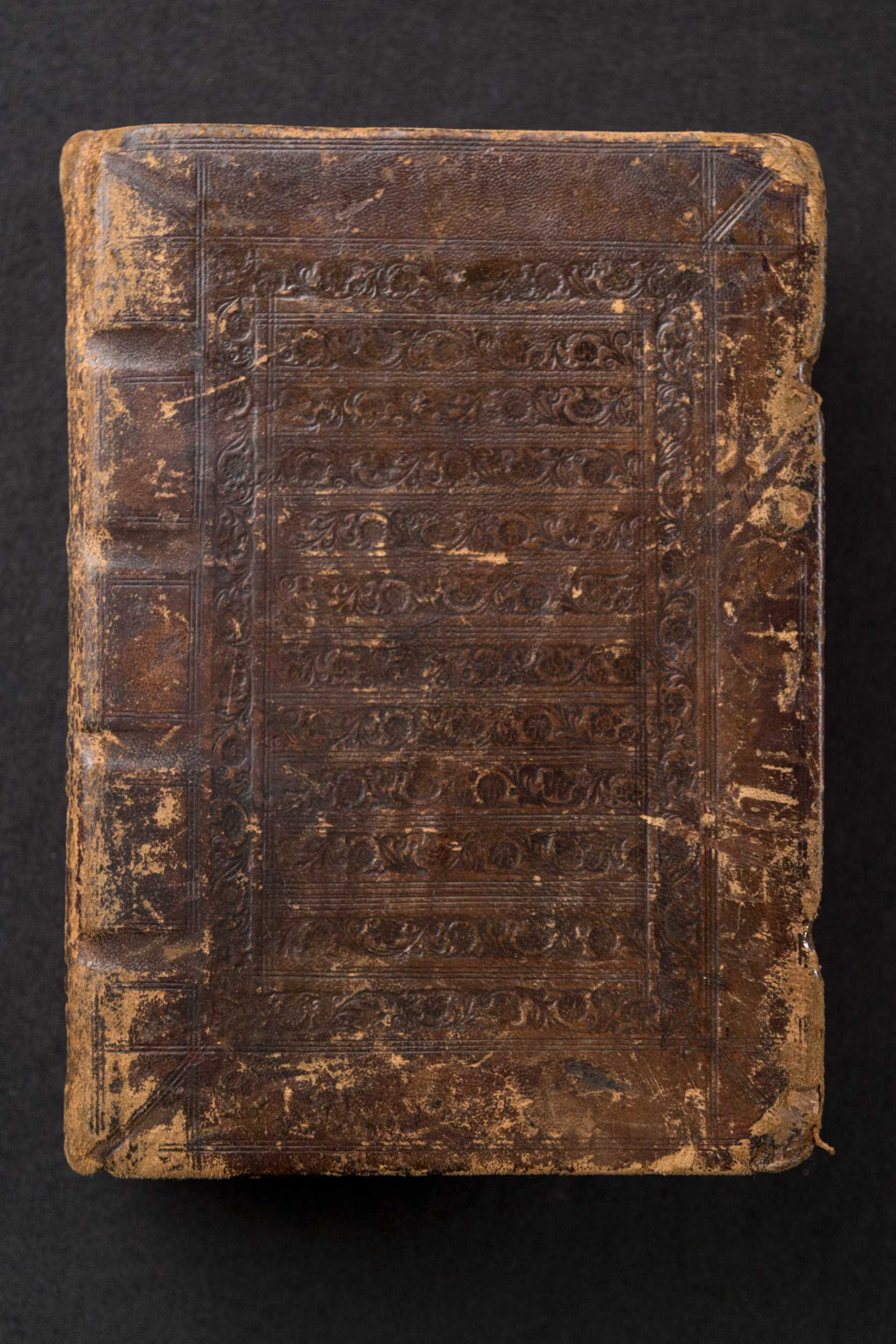

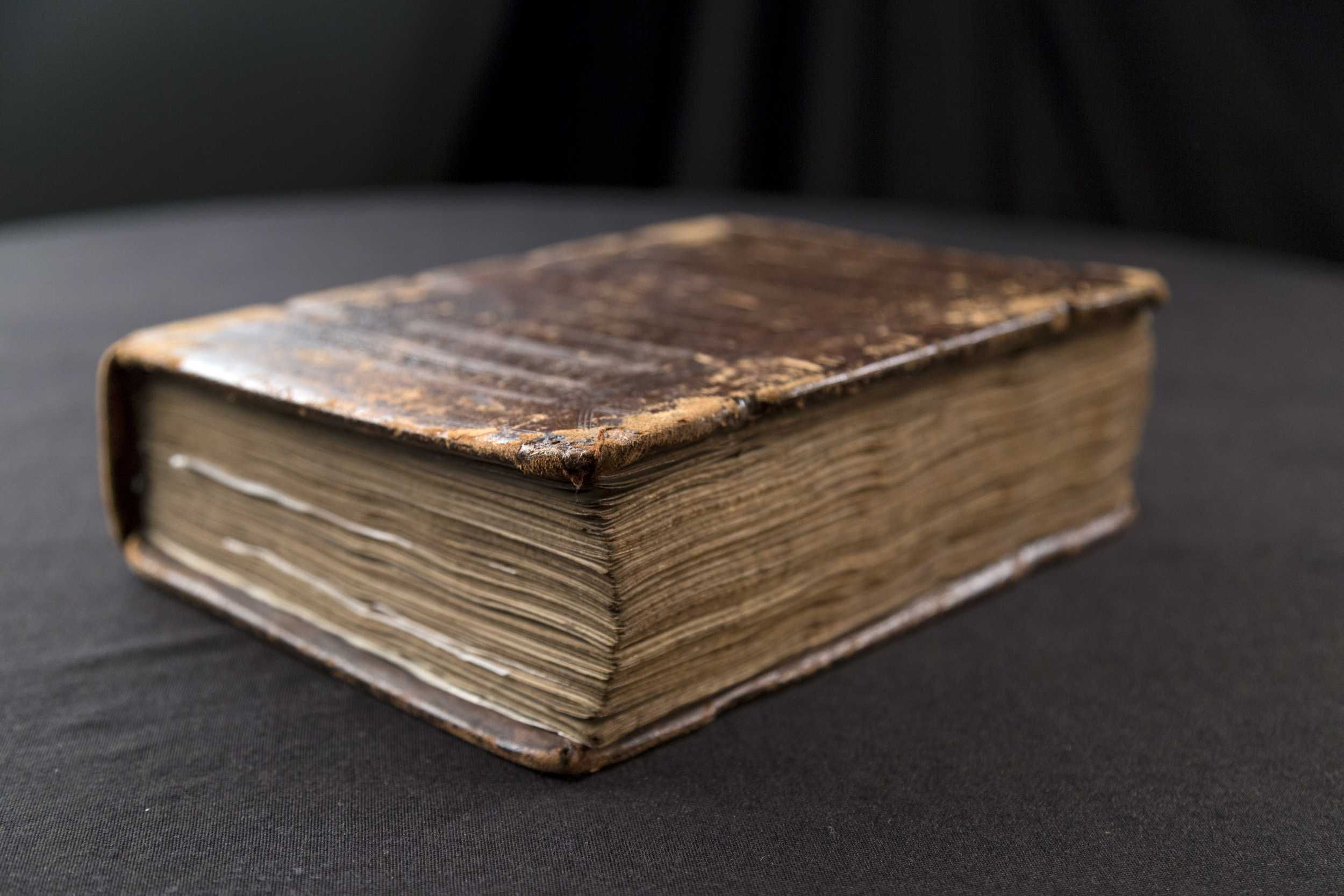

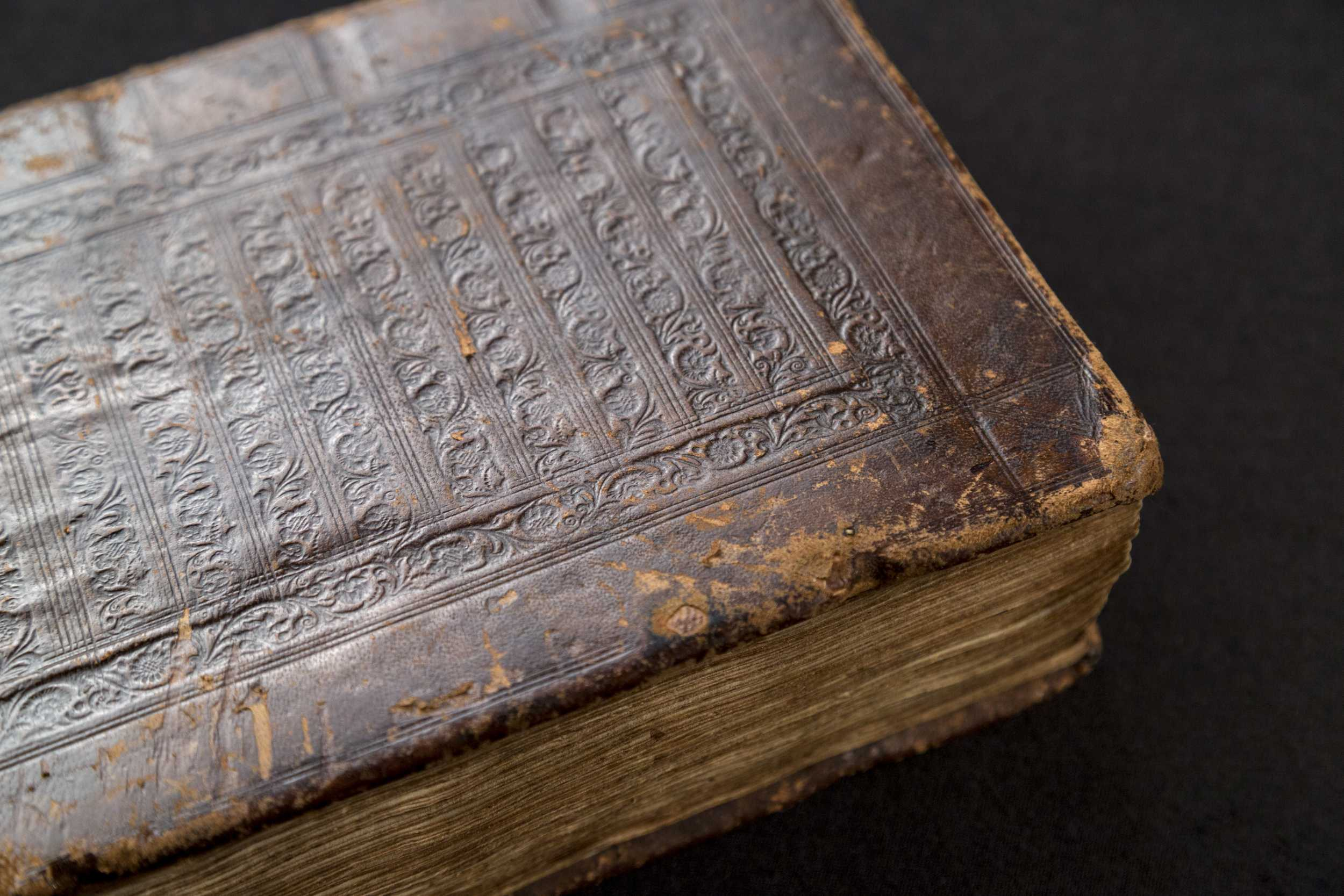

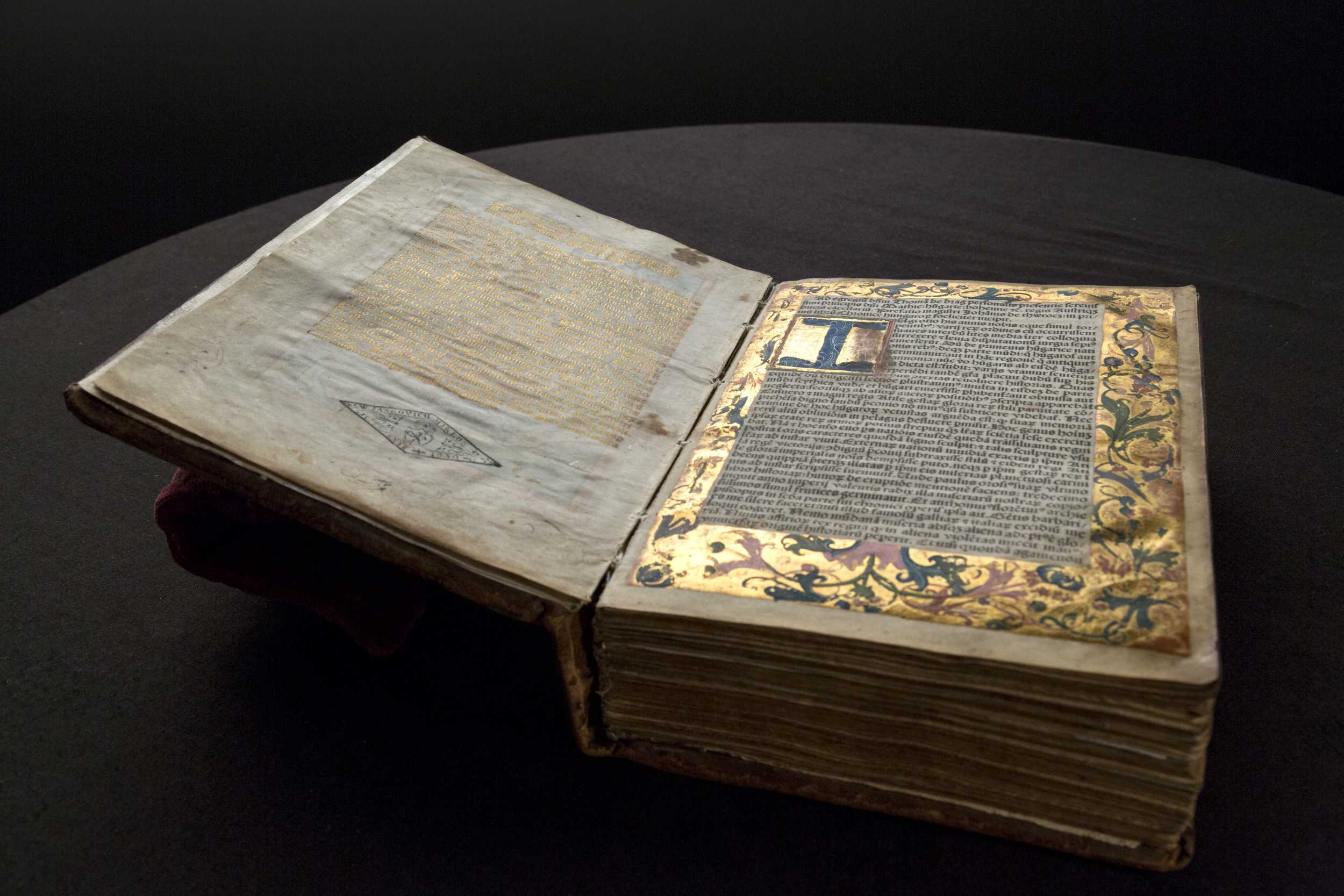

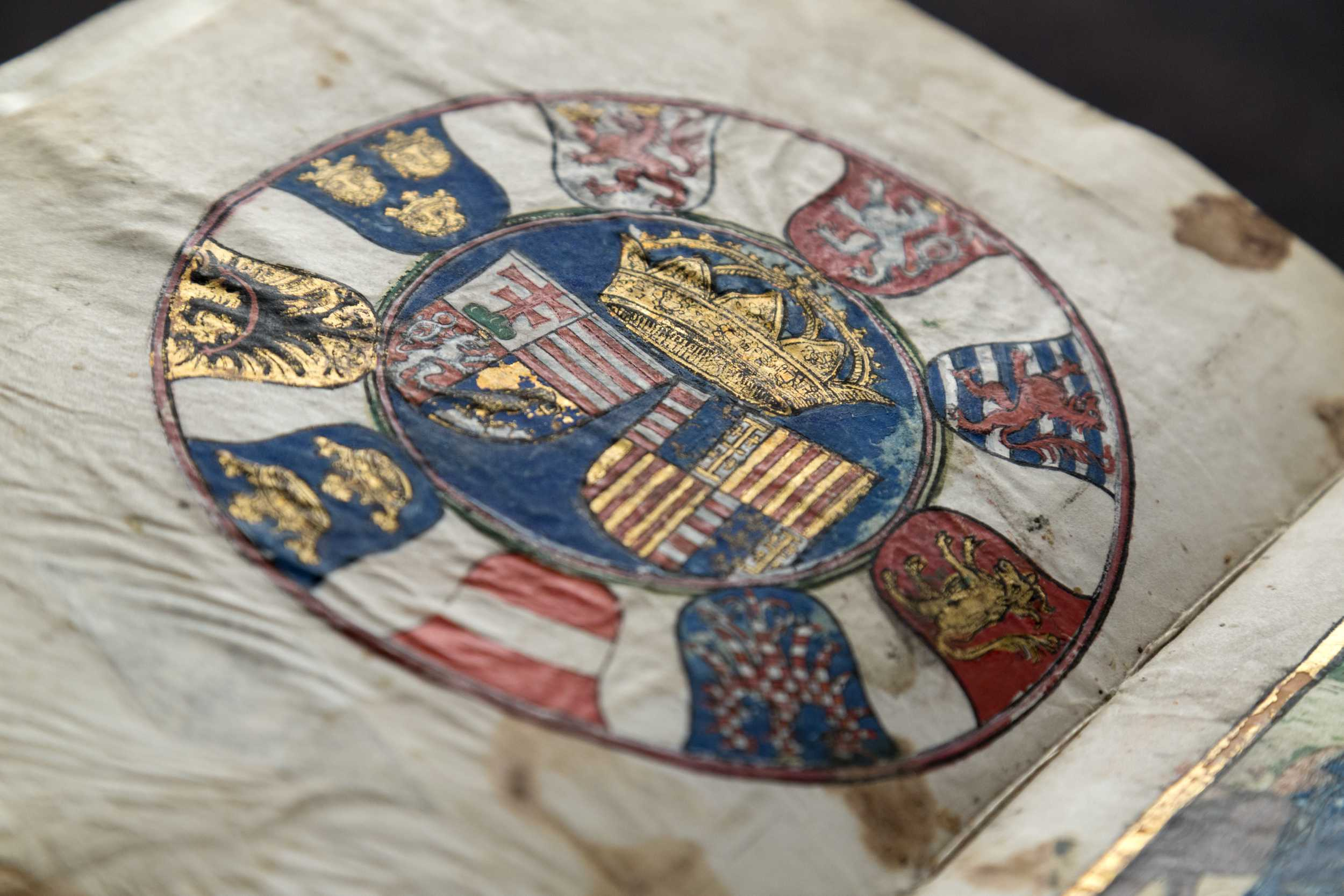

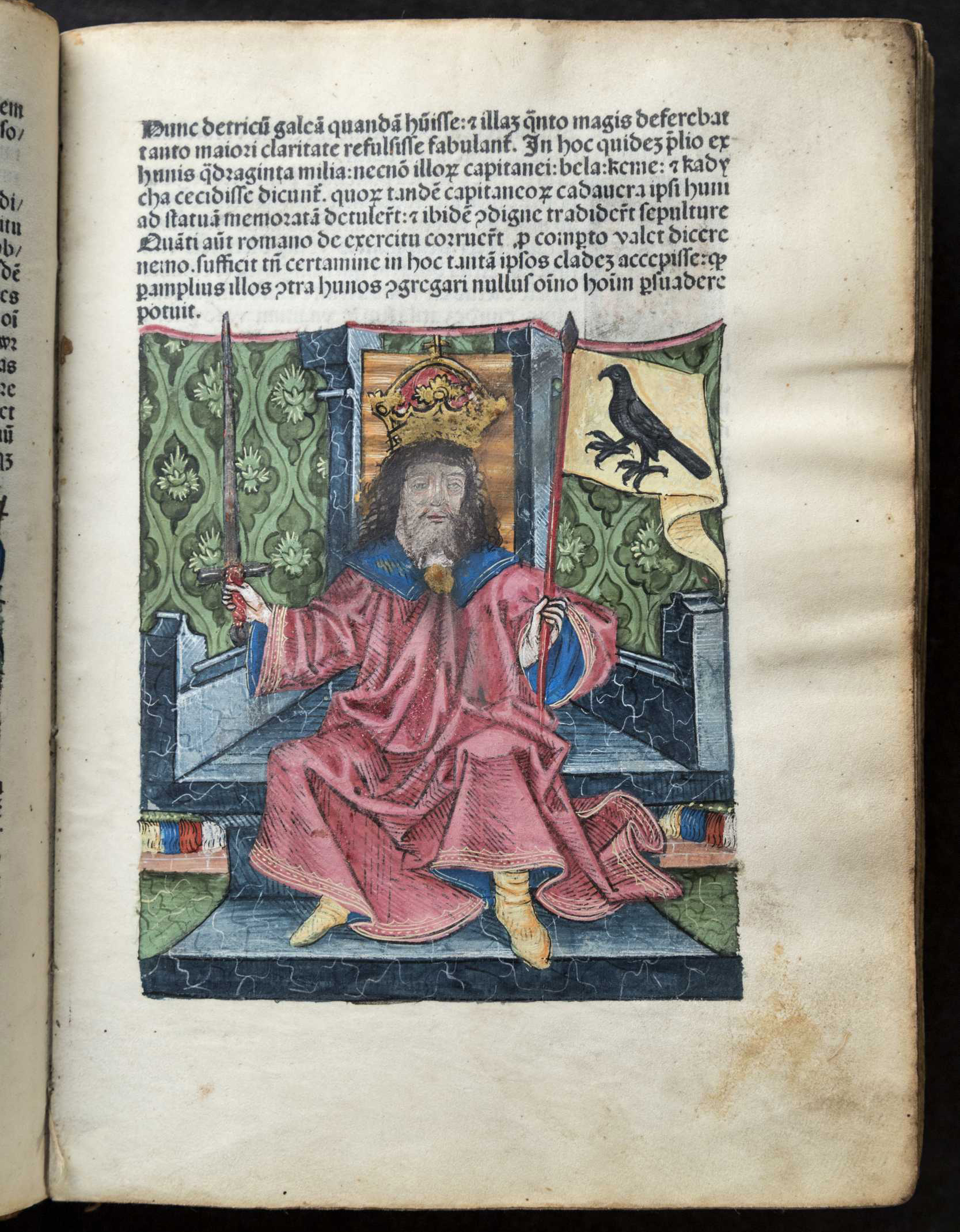

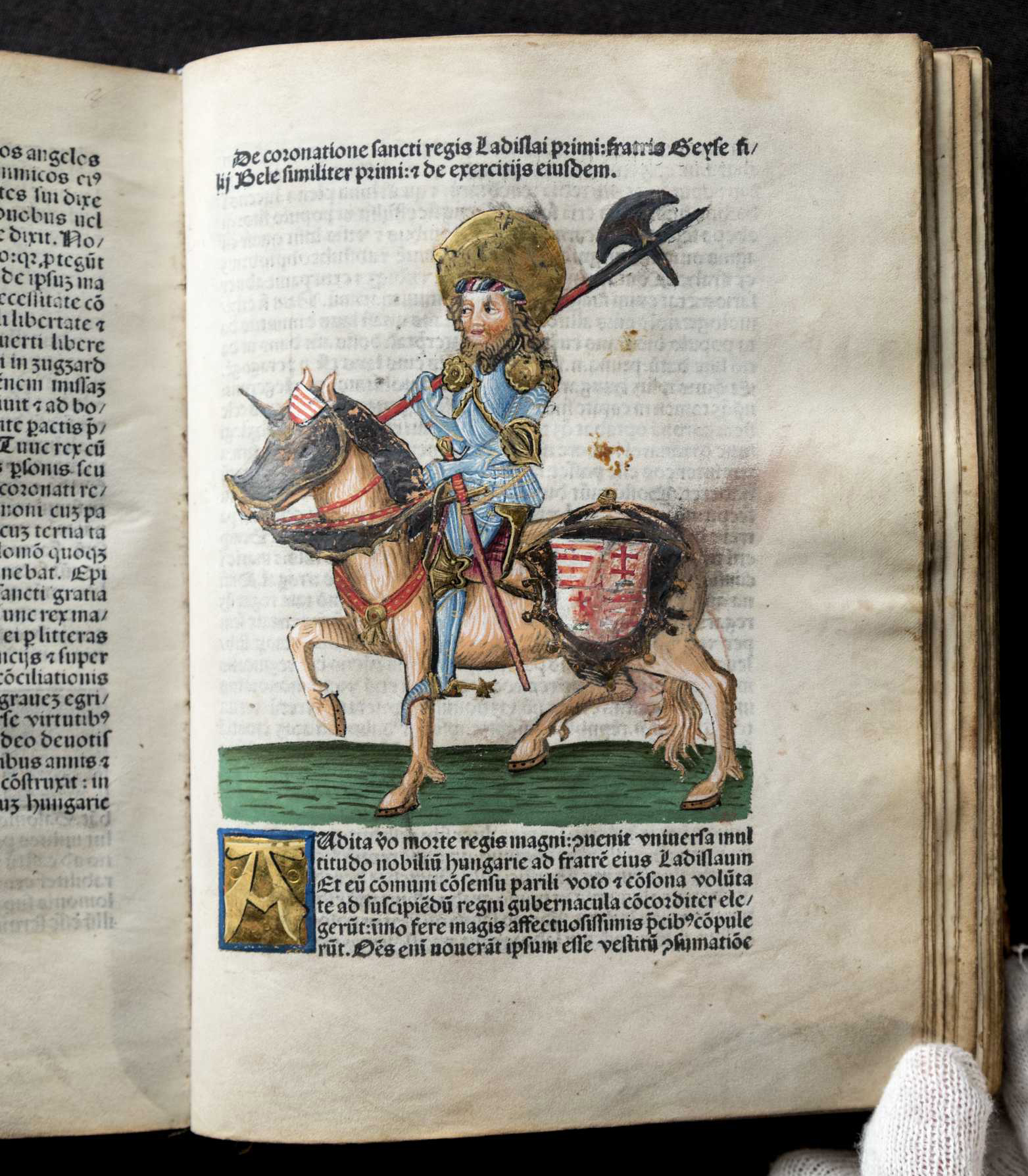

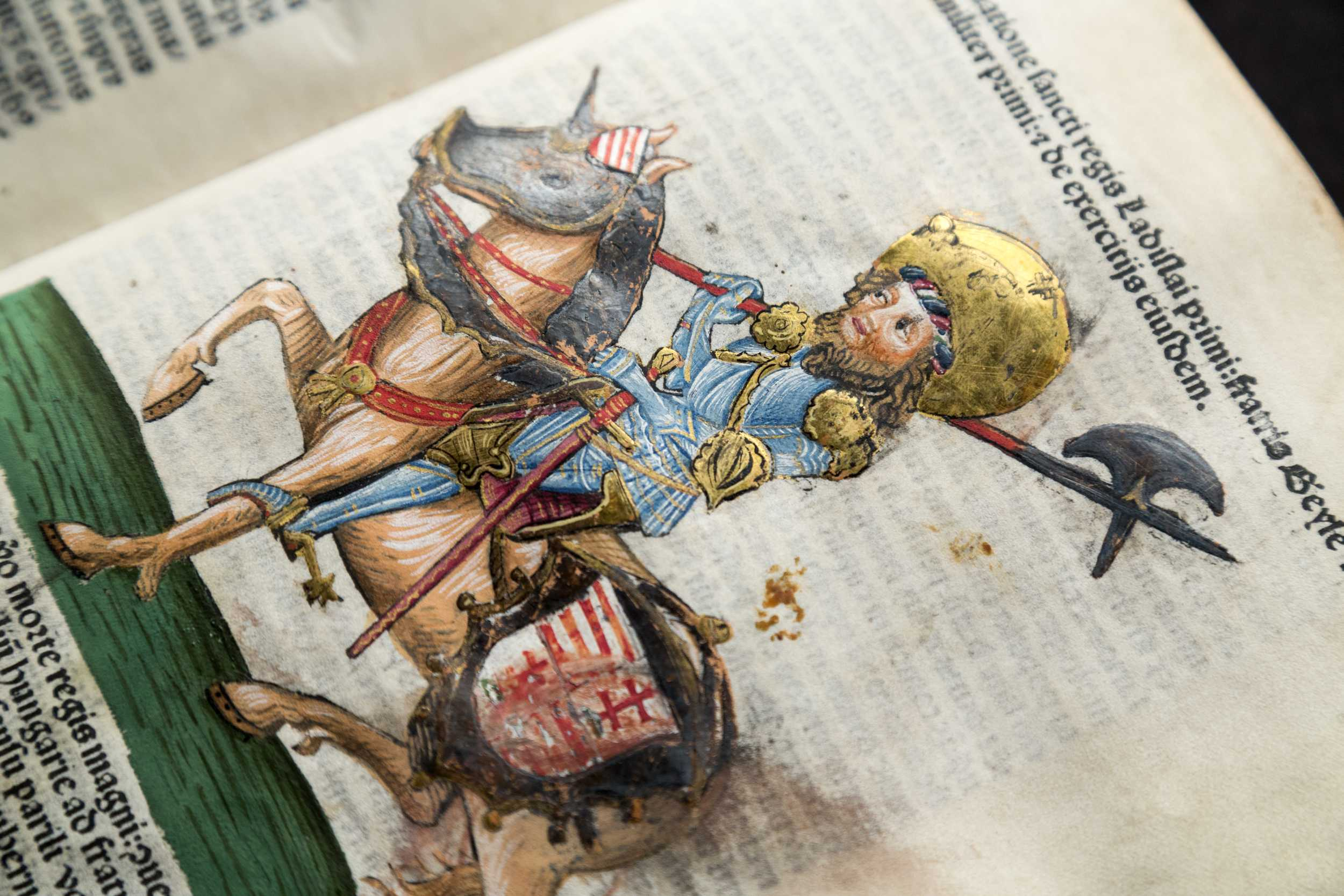

The images are listed alongside the chapter titles in the same order as they appear in one version of the Augsburg edition of the Chronica Hungarorum.

Illustration	Description
The Great Coats of Arms of King Matthias Corvinus of Hungary	The Great Coats of Arms of King Matthias Corvinus of Hungary: The great coats of arms of King Matthias Corvinus of Hungary of 1485 in the first page of the Chronica Hungarorum. The coat of arms of the countries of King Matthias Corvinus of Hungary and Queen Beatrice of Aragon.; In the center, the united coat of arms of Matthias and Beatrice: Matthias, quartered shield: 1: Hungarian double cross and trimount, 2: Hungarian Árpád stripes, 3: Bohemia, 4: Hunyadi family.; Beatrice, quartered shield: 1–3: vertically in thirds: a: Hungarian Árpád stripes, b: Anjou lilies, c: Jerusalem, 2–4: Aragon.; Clockwise in the outer circle: 1: Bohemia, 2: Luxemburg, 3: Lower Lusatia, 4: Moravia, 5: Austria, 6: Galicia, 7: Silesia, 8: Dalmatia.
Saint Ladislaus Chases the Cuman Warrior Who Kidnapped a Girl	Saint Ladislaus Chases the Cuman Warrior Who Kidnapped a Girl: Two scene in one picture. Saint Ladislaus is chasing and fighting a duel with a Cuman warrior. The legends related to Saint Ladislaus of Hungary, the events of the Battle of Kerlés in 1068 described in the chronicle and the scene of the girl kidnapping had a deep impact on posterity. The scene of the fight of the Christian king symbolizes the victory of Christianity over paganism.
The Prologue of Master Johannes Thuróczy to the First Book of the Chronicle of the Hungarians Page With Golden Frame	Preface: Prologue of Johannes Thuróczy in a golden frame with a flowered decorations.; It seemed they are almost silent that even about the glory of the deeds by the great King Attila, because a weak pen wrote it down, although his deeds are no less worthy of praise. But we should not accuse the old Hungarians of the sin of allowing the memory of their past to sink into the deep sea of forgetfulness. The generation of men who lived at the time of these events were more occupied with the sound of guns than with the science of casting letters. Because even in our time, a part of the same nation, which lives in the region of Transylvania, knows how to carve some kind of letters in wood, and using this rune, they live with it in the manner of casting letters. I think it was only the hatred of foreign peoples deprived King Attila from the glorifying pen that would have been worthy of his victories, and this robbed King Attila from the glory of the imperial title as well. That is why we find that nothing was written in praise of the deeds he accomplished, only the misery he caused was recorded in lamentable songs... Therefore, in order to describe in more detail the region of Scythia and the era worthy of immortality due to the great deeds of King Attila, and at the same time to review the history of the Hungarian kings who came after him, which had been written in the past, and to correct any mistakes in them due to the carelessness of their writers: encouraged by your encouragement, I gathered courage, to begin a task beyond my strength. — Johannes Thuróczy: Chronica Hungarorum
The Arrival of the Huns Into Pannonia and the Battle of Tárnok Valley Battle of the Tárnok Valley	Battle of Tárnok Valley: The Battle of Tárnok Valley was a legendary battle in the medieval Hungarian chronicles between the Huns and Romans in Pannonia. Captain Keve fell during the battle.; According to the old history of the Hungarians, Captain Keve and 125,000 men of the Huns fell in this battle, and 210,000 men of the army of Detre and Macrinus fell, not counting those who were destroyed in their tents by the night battle...According to Scythian custom, Captain Keve's body was buried with due respect in a grave worthy of him, beside the highway, and a statue, that is a stone pillar was erected there with great ceremony as an eternal memory of this great event. — Johannes Thuróczy: Chronica Hungarorum
The Battle Near a Place Named Zeiselmauer Battle of Zeiselmauer	Battle of Zeiselmauer: The Battle of Zeiselmauer was a legendary battle in the medieval Hungarian chronicles between the Huns and Romans in Pannonia.; After the Huns, namely the Hungarians experienced the bravery of the Romans and the way of their warefare, they reorganized their army, rushed the Transdanubian regions of Pannonia, took possession of them and they moved the people of their house here, then they moved towards the city of Tulln, where their opponents were assembled. Detre, Macrinus, and all the available forces of the Roman army marched against them on the field of Zeiselmauer. Both opponents attacked the opposing teams with equal fierceness. And the Huns wanted to die rather than retreat in the battle, according to Scythian custom they made a terrifying noise, they beat their drums and used every weapon against the enemy, but most of all their innumerable number of arrows. This caused the Roman troops to be confused, and so the Huns made a great slaughter among them. The morning began, and in a fierce battle which lasted until nine o'clock, the Roman army was defeated and put to flight with enormous loss. — Johannes Thuróczy: Chronica Hungarorum
Election of King Attila, His Morals and Weapons He Used Against the Enemy King Attila	King Attila: King Attila.; King Attila himself was feared by his own subjects because of his innate strictness and gloomy look, but he behaved with a noble spirit towards the peoples subject to him. As a military insignia, a crowned falcon was painted on both his shield and his flag. This military badge was worn by the Huns, namely the Hungarians, until the time of the son of Prince Taksony, Prince Géza. His title was like this: Attila son of Bendegúz, grandson of the great Nimrod who was raised in Engaddi, by the grace of God, King of the Huns, Medes, Goths and Danes, the Terror of the World, the Scourge of God. — Johannes Thuróczy: Chronica Hungarorum
The Famous and Great Battle of King Attila Which Was Fought on the Catalaunum Plain Battle of the Catalaunian Plains	Battle of the Catalaunian Plains: The Battle of the Catalaunian Plains between the Huns and their vassals commanded by their King Attila against a coalition led by the Roman general Aetius and by the Visigothic king Theodoric I in 451.
About the First Captain, the White Horse, the Golden Saddle and the Golden Brake Árpád, the First Captain	Árpád, the First Captain: Árpád, Grand Prince of the Hungarians.; And since Captain Árpád held a certain special dignity in Scythia, and it was the legal and approved Scythian custom of his tribe that when going on a campaign, one had to go first, and on retreat one had to stay behind – as a result, Árpád allegedly preceded the other captains in the entry into Pannonia. — Johannes Thuróczy: Chronica Hungarorum
About the First Captain, the White Horse, the Golden Saddle and the Golden Brake The Hungarians defeat Svatopluk	The Hungarians Defeat Svatopluk: The Seven chieftains of the Hungarians and the Hungarians led by Grand Prince Árpád defeat Svatopluk I of Moravia during the Hungarian conquest of the Carpathian Basin.; Meanwhile, Árpád entered Pannonia with the Seven Leaders – not as a guest, but as one who owns this land by right of inheritance... Upon hearing this, the leader [Svatopluk] suddenly gathered an army because he was afraid of the Hungarians. He asked his friends for help, and they all marched together against the Hungarians. In the meantime, they arrived at the Danube, and in the early dawn, they went into battle in a beautiful field. The help of the Lord was with the Hungarians, and before their sight the aforementioned leader retreated and ran. The Hungarians pursued him all the way to the Danube, and here he threw himself into the Danube in fear, and drowned in the fast-flowing water. The Lord returned Pannonia to the Hungarians, just as He gave the land of Sihon, the king of the Amorites, and the entire kingdom of Canaan to the children of Israel in the time of Moses. — Johannes Thuróczy: Chronica Hungarorum
The Second Captain Szabolcs, the Second Captain	Szabolcs, the Second Captain: Szabolcs, Hungarian chieftain from the seven chieftains of the Hungarians.
The Third Captain Gyula, the Third Captain	Gyula, the Third Captain: Gyula, Hungarian chieftain from the seven chieftains of the Hungarians.
The Fourth Captain Kund, the Fourth Captain	Kund, the Fourth Captain: Kund, Hungarian chieftain from the seven chieftains of the Hungarians.
The Fifth Captain Lehel, the Fifth Captain	Lehel, the Fifth Captain: Lehel, Hungarian chieftain from the seven chieftains of the Hungarians.
The Sixth Captain Vérbulcsú, the Sixth Captain	Vérbulcsú, the Sixth Captain: Vérbulcsú, Hungarian chieftain from the seven chieftains of the Hungarians.
The Seventh Captain Örs, the Seventh Captain	Örs, the Seventh Captain: Örs, Hungarian chieftain from the seven chieftains of the Hungarians.
The Hungarians Are Destroying Bulgaria Hungarian Campaign Against Bulgaria	Hungarian Campaign Against Bulgaria: Hungarian campaign against the Bulgarians in the 10th century.
The Birth and Reign of Saint Stephen, the First King of the Hungarians King Saint Stephen and Prince Saint Emeric	King Saint Stephen and Prince Saint Emeric: King Saint Stephen I of Hungary and his son Prince Saint Emeric.
Battle of King Saint Stephen Against Koppány, Duke of Somogy Battle of King Saint Stephen Against Koppány	Battle of King Saint Stephen Against Koppány: Battle of King Saint Stephen I of Hungary against Koppány, Duke of Somogy.
The Death of King Saint Stephen and the Election of King Peter King Peter	King Peter: King Peter Orseolo of Hungary.
Expulsion of Peter and Election of Aba as King King Samuel Aba	King Samuel Aba: King Samuel Aba of Hungary.
The Coronation of King Andrew Who Was Called Endre the First King Andrew I	King Andrew I: King Andrew I of Hungary.
The Coronation and Engagement of King Solomon King Solomon	King Solomon: King Solomon of Hungary.
The Coronation, Life and Reign of King Béla the First King Béla I	King Béla I: King Béla I of Hungary.
The King’s Fraud, the Two Campaigns of the Princes and Their Victory The Battle of King Solomon and Prince Géza Against the Greeks	The Battle of King Solomon and Prince Géza Against the Greeks: The battle of King Solomon of Hungary and Prince Géza of Hungary against the Byzantine Empire. The Hungarians took Belgrade after a siege of three months in 1071 and Niš in 1072.
How Géza the First Was Crowned As King After the Defeat and Running Away of King Solomon King Géza I	King Géza I: King Géza I of Hungary.
The Coronation and Campaigns of Saint Ladislaus the First, Brother of Géza and Son of King Béla the First King Saint Ladislaus	King Saint Ladislaus: King Saint Ladislaus I of Hungary.
The Coronation of Coloman, Son of King Géza the First, Grandson of King Béla the First King Coloman	King Coloman: King Coloman of Hungary.
After the Death of King Coloman, His Son, Stephen the Second Was Crowned As King King Stephen II	King Stephen II: King Stephen II of Hungary.
The Reign of Béla the Second the Blind, He Is the Son of Prince Álmos, Grandson of Lampert, Great-Grandson of King Béla the First King Béla the Blind	King Béla the Blind: King Béla II of Hungary.
The Coronation and the Deeds of King Géza the Second, the First-Born Son of King Béla the Blind King Géza II	King Géza II: King Géza II of Hungary.
The Coronation and the Deeds of King Géza the Second, the First-Born Son of King Béla the Blind The Battle of the Fischa	The Battle of the Fischa: The Battle of the Fischa was a victory for the Hungarian army under the leadership of King Géza II and his uncle, Palatine Belos, which defeated a great German army led by Duke Henry X during an open battle in 1146.
The Coronation of King Stephen the Third, Who Was the Son of Géza the Second and the Grandson of King Béla The Blind. Prince Ladislaus, the Second Son of King Béla the Blind Usurs the Crown King Stephen III	King Stephen III: King Stephen III of Hungary.
The Coronation of King Béla the Third, Who Was the Brother of Stephen the Third and the Son of Géza the Second King Béla III	King Béla III: King Béla III of Hungary.
The Coronation of King Emeric, Who Was the Son of King Béla the Third King Emeric	King Emeric: King Emeric of Hungary.
The Coronation of King Ladislaus the Third, Who Was the Son of King Emeric King Ladislaus III	King Ladislaus III: King Ladislaus III of Hungary.
The Coronation of King Andrew the Second, Father of Saint Elizabeth, He Was the Son of King Béla the Third and Was Also Called Andrew of Jerusalem King Andrew II	King Andrew II: King Andrew II of Hungary.
The Coronation of King Béla the Fourth, He Was the Son of King Andrew the Second. Also the First Arrival of the Tatars and the Terrible Destruction of Hungary King Béla IV	King Béla IV: King Béla IV of Hungary.
The War of King Béla With Ottokar, King of Bohemia The Battle of Kressenbrunn	The Battle of Kressenbrunn: The Battle of Kressenbrunn was fought in 1260 in Lower Austria between the Kingdom of Hungary and the Kingdom of Bohemia for the possession of the duchies of Austria and Styria. The Hungarian forces were led by King Béla IV of Hungary, while the Bohemians were led by King Ottokar II of Bohemia.
The Coronation of King Stephen the Fifth, Son of King Béla the Fourth King Stephen V	King Stephen V: King Stephen V of Hungary.
The Coronation of King Ladislaus the Fourth, Son of King Stephen the Fifth, Who Is Called Ladislaus the Cuman King Ladislaus the Cuman	King Ladislaus the Cuman: King Ladislaus IV of Hungary.
The Coronation of King Andrew the Third, the Grandson of King Andrew the Second, He Was Also Called Andrew the Venetian King Andrew III	King Andrew III: King Andrew III of Hungary.
Ladislaus, that is King Wenceslaus Leaves Hungary and Returns to Bohemia King Wenceslaus	King Wenceslaus: King Wenceslaus of Hungary.
Bringing Otto, Prince of Bavaria to Hungary, His Coronation, Captivity and Expulsion, All This Is the Work of Some Barons Against Charles the Child King Otto	King Otto: King Otto of Hungary.
The Arrival of Friar Cardinal Gentilis to Hungary and the Crowning of Charles as King King Charles I	King Charles I: King Charles I of Hungary.
The Unfortunate Campaign of King Charles Against Voivode Basarab of Wallachia The Battle of Posada	The Battle of Posada: The Battle of Posada was fought in 1330 between Charles I of Hungary and Basarab I of Wallachia.
The Coronation, Life and Campaigns of King Louis King Louis I	King Louis I: King Louis I of Hungary.
The Campaign Against the Croatians The Campaign of King Louis I Against the Croatians	The Campaign of King Louis I Against the Croatians: The campaign of King Louis I of Hungary against the rebellious Croatian nobles. King Louis I marched to Croatia in June 1345 and besieged Knin.
The Battle of Voivode Stephen Against the Army of Louis, Husband of Joanna Around Naples The Battle of Stephen Lackfi Against Louis of Taranto Around Naples	The Battle of Stephen Lackfi Against Louis of Taranto Around Naples: The battle of Voivode Stephen Lackfi against Louis of Taranto, husband of Queen Joanna of Naples in 1349 around Naples.
The Coronation of Queen Mary and This Following Hate Queen Mary	Queen Mary: Queen Mary of Hungary.
The Coronation of King Charles King Charles II	King Charles II: King Charles II of Hungary.
The Coronation of King Sigismund King Sigismund	King Sigismund: King Sigismund of Hungary.
Punishment of Ban John Horvati Campaign of King Sigismund Against the Rebel Lords	Campaign of King Sigismund Against the Rebel Lords: Campaign of King Sigismund of Hungary against the rebellious House of Horvat in 1387.
King Sigismund’s Wars Against the Hussites and the Burning of John Hus The Wars of King Sigismund Against the Hussites	The Wars of King Sigismund Against the Hussites: The Hussite Wars between 1419–1434 during the reign of King Sigismund of Hungary.
The Campaign of the Hungarians in the Region of Bosnia The Campaign of Hungarians Against Bosnia	The Campaign of Hungarians Against Bosnia: The campaign of Hungarians against Bosnia during the reign of King Sigismund of Hungary.
The Coronation of King Albert and the Plundering in the City of Buda King Albert	King Albert: King Albert of Hungary.
The Birth and Crowning of Ladislaus the Child, and Taking of the Crown King Ladislaus V	King Ladislaus V: King Ladislaus V of Hungary.
The Coronation of King Vladislaus, and the Internal Strife That Followed King Vladislaus I	King Vladislaus I: King Vladislaus I of Hungary.
The Battle of Lord Voivode John Around Belgrade The Battle of John Hunyadi Around Belgrade	The Battle of John Hunyadi Around Belgrade: The battle of John Hunyadi in 1441 against the Ottomans who attacked Belgrade again after the Siege of Belgrade in 1440.
The Transylvanian Campaign and Battle of Lord Voivode John The Battle of Szeben	The Battle of John Hunyadi Against Mezid Bey: The Battle of Iron Gate in 1442. The Hungarian forces were commanded by John Hunyadi against the Ottoman forces by Mezid Bey, the Marcher Lord of Nicopolis, who broke in Transylvania.
The Battle of Lord Voivode John Which He Fought at the Iron Gate The Battle of John Hunyadi at the Iron Gate	The Battle of John Hunyadi Against Şehabeddin Pasha: The Battle of the Ialomița in 1442. John Hunyadi defeated the army of Şehabeddin Pasha, the Provincial Governor of Rumelia, at the Ialomița River.; According to the chronicle, the battle took place at the Iron Gate Pass in Transylvania, while modern historiography places the battle at the Ialomița River in Wallachia.; The chronicle states that Hunyadi, with his 15,000 men, defeated the 80,000-strong Ottoman army.
Lord Voivode John Avenges the Grief on the Turks, Six Lucky Battles The Long Campaign of John Hunyadi	The Long Campaign of John Hunyadi: The Long campaign of John Hunyadi against the Ottomans in 1443–1444.
The Campaign and Destruction of King Vladislaus in the Area of Rumelia, Around the City of Varna, Close to the Sea The Battle of Varna	The Battle of Varna: The Battle of Varna in 1444.
Election of Lord Voivode John as Governor and His Revenge Against Voivode Dracul John Hunyadi	John Hunyadi: Regent-Governor John Hunyadi of Hungary.
The Battle of Lord Governor at the Blackbird's Field The Battle of Kosovo	The Battle of Kosovo: The Battle of Kosovo in 1448.
The Emperor of the Turks Is Sieging Nándorfehérvár The Siege of Belgrade	The Siege of Belgrade: After the Fall of Constantinople in 1453, the Siege of Belgrade in 1456 was a major issue for the entire Europe, the fall of Belgrade would have opened the gates of Europe to the Ottoman Empire. The Ottoman Sultan Mehmed the Conqueror mobilized his armies in an attempt to crush the Kingdom of Hungary, his immediate objective was the border fortress of Belgrade. John Hunyadi, who had fought many battles against the Turks in the previous two decades, prepared the defenses of the fortress. The siege escalated into a major battle, during which Hunyadi led a sudden counterattack that overran the Ottoman camp, ultimately compelling the wounded Mehmed II to lift the siege and retreat. The battle had significant consequences, as it stabilized the southern frontiers of the Kingdom of Hungary for more than half a century and thus considerably delayed the Ottoman advance in Europe.; Pope Callixtus III ordered the bells of every European church to be rung every day at noon, as a call for believers to pray for the defenders of the city. The news of victory arrived before the Pope’s order in many European countries. Therefore, the ringing of the church bells was believed to be in celebration of the victory. As a result, the church bells ringing is now the commemoration of the victory of John Hunyadi against the Ottomans.
The Election of Lord Count Matthias as King King Matthias Corvinus	King Matthias Corvinus: King Matthias Corvinus of Hungary.

Appendix at the end of the chronicle from Master Roger: A mournful song about the destruction of the Tatars in Hungary.

Illustration	Description
The Arrival of Tatars in Hungary During the Time of King Béla the Fourth First Mongol invasion of Hungary	First Mongol Invasion of Hungary: First Mongol invasion of Hungary between 1241 and 1242.

== See also ==
- List of Hungarian chronicles
- Gesta Hungarorum
- Gesta Hunnorum et Hungarorum
- Chronicon Pictum
- Chronica Hungarorum – Buda Chronicle
- Epitome rerum Hungarorum
- Nádasdy Mausoleum
