= Pietro Ranzano =

15th-century Roman Catholic bishop

Most Reverend Pietro Ranzano
- Bishop of Lucera
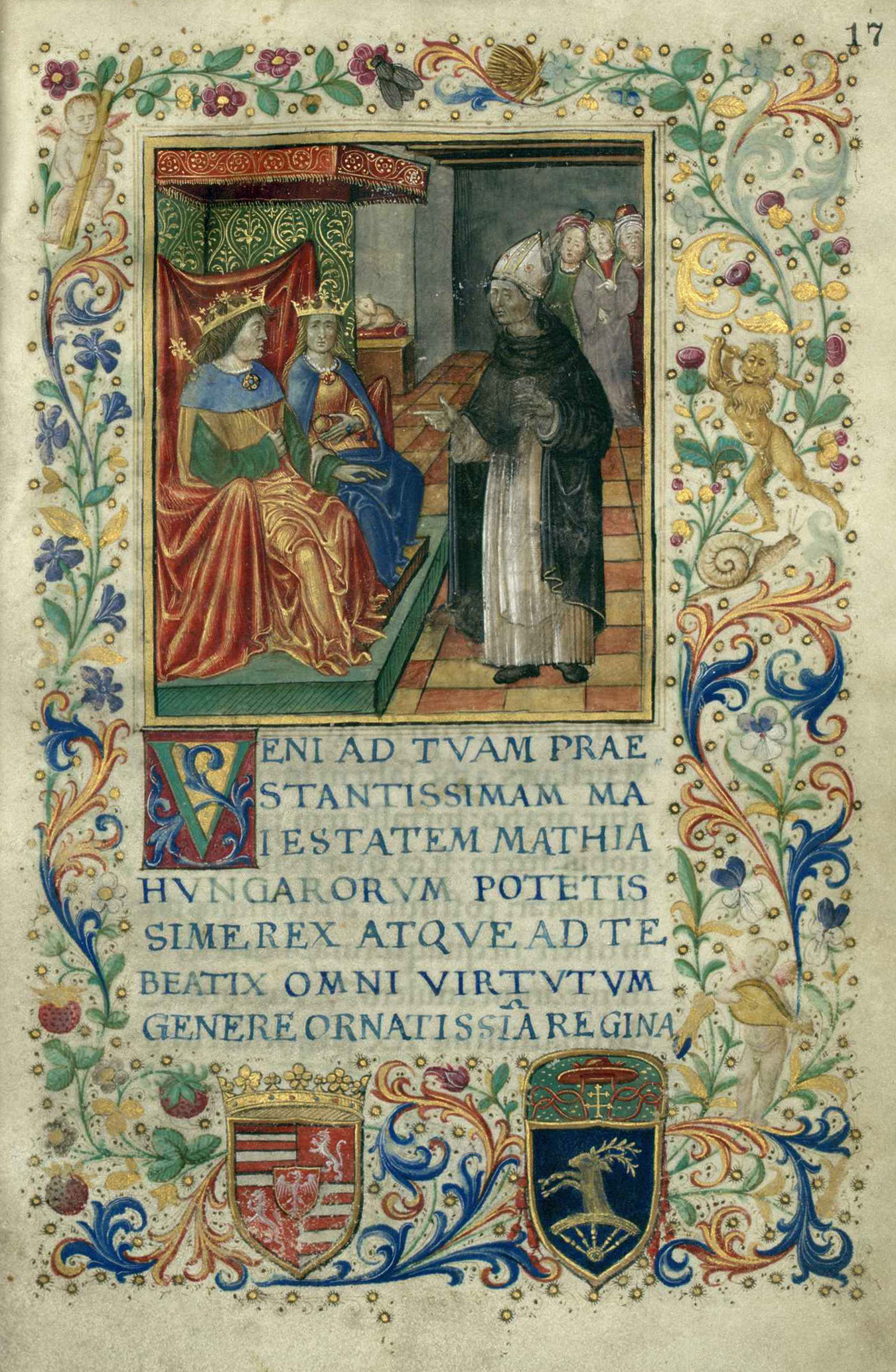
- Italian humanist, Pietro Ranzano before King Matthias Corvinus of Hungary and Queen Beatrice (Epitome rerum Hungarorum, 1490)
- Church: Catholic Church
- In office: 1476–1492
- Predecessor: Ladislao Dentice
- Successor: Giambattista Contestabili

Pietro Ranzano (Palermo, 1428–Lucera, 1492) was an Italian Dominican friar, bishop, historian, humanist and scholar who is best known for his work, De primordiis et progressu felicis Urbis Panormi, a history of the city of Palermo from its beginnings up until the contemporary period in which Ranzano was writing. The composition is influenced to some extent by humanistic conceptions of historical research, offers glimpses into the world view of a Sicilian intellectual of the Renaissance period on Jews and Jewish culture, as well as Sicily’s past.

== Ranzano and his Works ==
Ranzano would study Latin at the school of humanist Antonio Cassarino, who at the time was a teacher of young children (magister scholae parvulorum) in Palermo. Like other scholars of his era, he would study at various institutions which were headed by various masters such as Pietro Aretino in Florence, Tommaso Pontano in Perguia, and Vitaliano Borromeo and Pietro Candido Decembro in Milan and Pavia. Ranzano would go on to join the Dominican Order at the age of sixteen and by the time he was twenty-eight, he had become Provincial of the Dominicans in Sicily. Around the year 1464, Ranzano would be appointed papal nuncio in the kingdom of Sicily and he would be entrusted with the organization of the crusade against the Turks in conjunction with preaching and collecting funds for the aforementioned crusade. While in Palermo, Ranzano taught at the Dominican College. Ranzano’s personality and education influenced his work, creating a particular mixture of secular and religious learning that arguably can be perceived as the hallmark of Sicilian humanism.

== History of Palermo ==
Pietro Ranzano’s works were very popular in the time in which they were written. However, his account of Palermo’s history served as a model for later Sicilian historians. The composition was written in first person and it includes various personal earmarks such as Ranzano illustrating his own ideas and spending a great deal of time on his search for ancient sources and his efforts to pursue his story by all possible means. The writing utilizes foundation legends which epitomize the way in which narratives on the origins of cities were formulated. Ranzano’s investigations with regards to attempting to learn of the origins of Palermo (circa quista origini di la mia patria), place him in the context of the prevailing quest in the Renaissance era for sources (ad fontes) and his quest would lead him to an inscription which he would assume to be "Chaldean" characters which were inscribed on a tower which stood above the Porta Patitelli in Palermo. The inscription would later be discovered to be a forgery therefore rendering Ranzano’s deduction that the city of Palermo originated from the Chaldeans as erroneous. However, the writing he composed is still important as it gives an insight as to the views held by Sicilian intellectual elite’s near the time of the expulsion of the Jews from Sicily.

== The Dominican Friar and the Jews ==
If looking at Ranzano’s writings of the Jews on the surface, one would conclude that it presents an image of positive relations between Jews and Christians in Palermo. However, looking deeper into his descriptions reveals that he perceives local Jews as holding an ancestral memory of the Chaldean inscription but not having historical evidence to back up their ‘memories’ of the past; they told Ranzano about the existence of an ancient book but they had no copy of it. In contrast, a Pisan Jew, Isaac Guglielmo, who owned the book which the local Jews where referring to and showed it to Ranzano. Correlating with Augustinian tradition, Ranzano would perceive the Jews as custodians of the past who could corroborate the writings in the inscription.

== Activity in Hungary ==
In 1488 he was sent to Hungary, to the court of Matthias Corvinus as the envoy of the Kingdom of Naples. The queen, Beatrice of Naples commissioned him to write a history of Hungary. Pietro Ranzano has finished the work in a year under the title Epitome rerum Hungarorum. The heroic history treated the Hungarians as the direct descendants of the Huns and the king as the second Attila.

== Death and legacy ==
Ranzano’s History of Palermo remains the only Sicilian historical account which takes a significant look at the Jews as well as Jewish culture. The composition offers a look at Jews and Christians with regard to cultural encounters in fifteenth-century Sicily. The story of Palermo exhibits many of the facets of the Renaissance culture of that period. In addition, the history illustrates the sophistication of an area which was at a cultural crossroads between Italy and the Hispanic world along with facing adversity with regard to various ethnic groups presence; most notably the Muslims and the Jews. Ranzano’s death in 1492 marks the end of an era, that being of multicultural Sicily as that year would coincide with expulsion of the Jews from Sicily.

== Bibliography ==
- Zeldes, Nadia. 2006. "The Last Multi-Cultural Encounter in Medieval Sicily: A Dominican Scholar, an Arabic Inscription, and a Jewish Legend." Mediterranean Historical Review 21 (2): 159-91., 160.
- Figliuolo, Bruno (2016). "RANZANO, Pietro". Dizionario Biografico degli Italiani (in Italian). Vol. 86: Querenghi–Rensi. Rome: Istituto dell'Enciclopedia Italiana. ISBN 978-88-12-00032-6.

Catholic Church titles
Preceded by Ladislao Dentice	Bishop of Lucera; 1476–1492	Succeeded by Giambattista Contestabili
