= Urgesta =

Hungarian chronicle

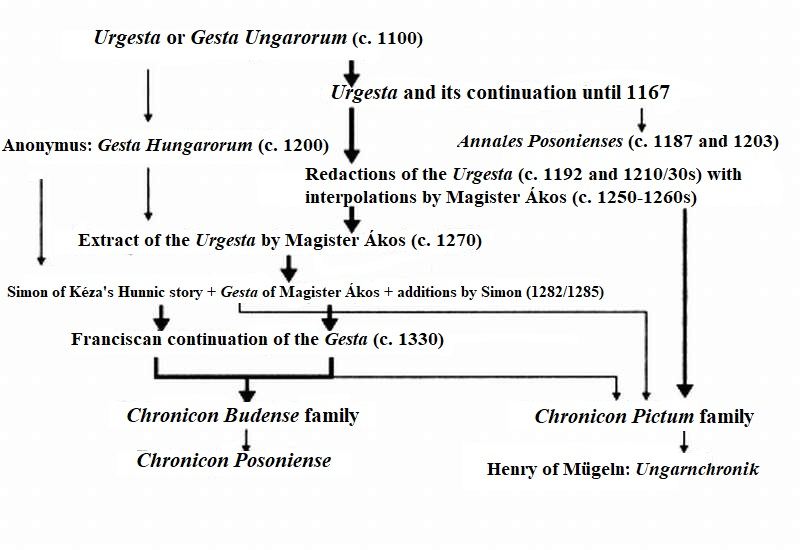
Family tree of the Hungarian chronicles until the 14th century, according to György Györffy (1993)

The Urgesta, also Gesta Ungarorum, Gesta Hungarorum vetera or ancient gesta (Hungarian: ősgeszta) (Note: also translated as ancestral gesta, primaeval gesta, primordial gesta, primary gesta or old gesta in academic works) are the historiographical names of the earliest Hungarian chronicle, which was completed in the second half of the 11th century or in the early 12th century. Its text was expanded and rewritten several times in the 12th–14th centuries, but the chronicle itself was lost since then and its content can only be reconstructed based on 14th-century works, most notably the Illuminated Chronicle.

== Compilation, continuations and redactions ==
=== Date of the first chronicle ===
The Urgesta can be considered the beginning of Hungarian historiography, but there is no consensus among scholars (historians, linguists etc.) regarding the date and circumstances of its origin.

Position of historians (summary table)
Compilation	Historians
Under Andrew I (r. 1046–1060)	Stephan Endlicher (1827), Ferenc Toldy (1868), Gyula Pauler (1883^{1}), Sándor Domanovszky (1906), Zoltán Tóth (1933), János Győry (1943), György Györffy (1948^{1}), János Horváth, Jr. (1954), Tibor Klaniczay (1964), György Szabados (2009)
Under Solomon (r. 1063–1074)	Gyula Sebestyén (1904), Jenő Vértesy (1905), Géza Nagy (1908), József Gerics (1961), Lajos J. Csóka (1967), Elemér Mályusz (1967), Kornél Szovák (2004)
Under Ladislaus I (r. 1077–1095)	Gyula Pauler (1899^{2}), Ubul Kállay (1915), Bálint Hóman (1925), József Deér (1937), Péter Váczy (1938), Marian Plezia (1947^{1}), Carlile Aylmer Macartney (1953), János Bollók (1986)
Under Coloman (r. 1095–1116)	Raimund Friedrich Kaindl (1893), László Geréb (1950), Marian Plezia (1959^{2}), György Györffy (1969^{2}), Gyula Kristó (1994), László Veszprémy (2004), Dániel Bagi (2005), Gábor Thoroczkay (2010), Péter B. Kovács (2020), Bernadett Benei (2022)
Under Géza II (r. 1141–1162)	Henrik Marczali (1880), Imre Madzsar (1926)
Simon of Kéza	László Erdélyi (1933)

==== Andrew I (r. 1046–1060) ====
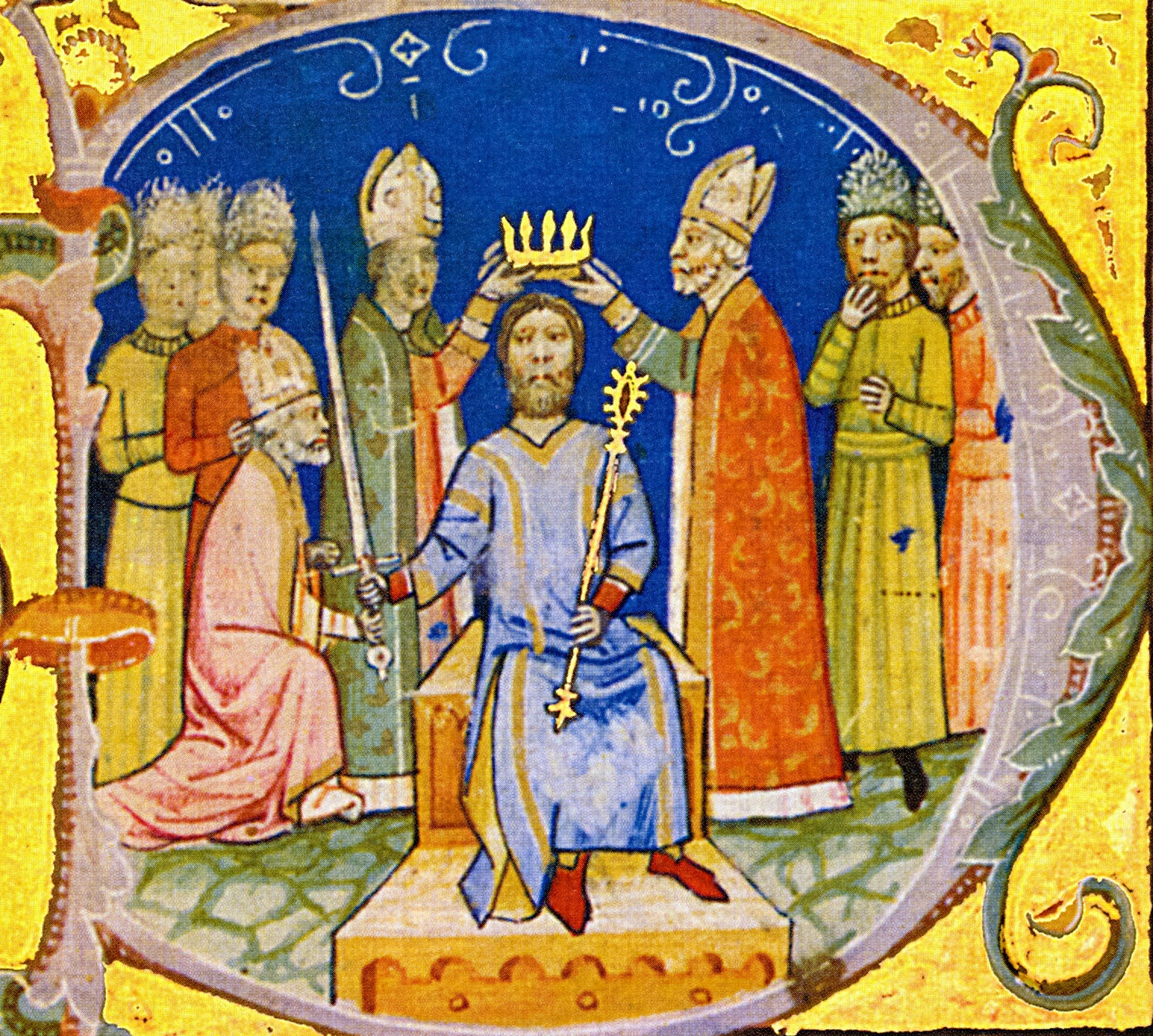
Coronation of Andrew I (Illuminated Chronicle)

Stephan Endlicher (1827) was the first historian and philologist, who thought that the earliest Hungarian chronicle was written during the reign of Andrew I. Literary historian Ferenc Toldy (1868) considered that historical records were made already in the last decades of the Principality of Hungary in the 10th century, (Note: Reflecting this, György Györffy emphasized that even if the records were written in the 10th century, they were written in Hungarian or Turkic, which could not have influenced Latin-language literature.) in addition to annals from the first Benedictine monasteries. Toldy argued Stephen I ordered to compile the deeds of the Hungarians by utilizing these records. He emphasized that the Illuminated Chronicle refers to "the ancient books about the deeds of the Hungarians", while Simon of Kéza's Gesta Hunnorum et Hungarorum also writes about an ancient chronicle. This work was extended into a chronicle under Andrew I, definitely before the birth of Solomon in 1053, as Toldy claimed. Historian Gyula Pauler (1883) initially considered too that the first chronicle was written under Andrew I and it narrates the history of Hungary from the rivalry between the king and his rebellious brother Béla. Later, he modified his viewpoint (see below).

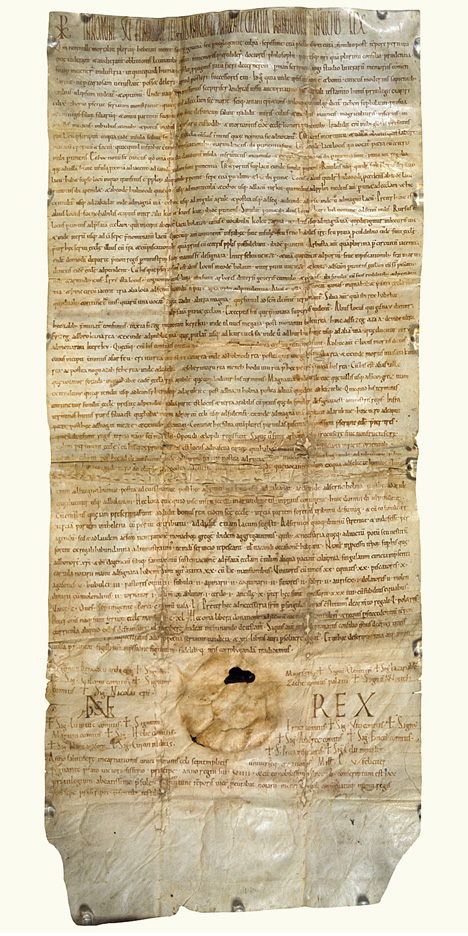
The establishing charter of the abbey of Tihany (1055)

Sándor Domanovszky (1930s) listed three arguments why the Urgesta was completed during the reign of Andrew I. He claimed that the 13th-century historian Alberic of Trois-Fontaines utilized only the ancient gesta in his chronicle, because he draws data from the Hungarian chronicle textual tradition only up to 1047. Additionally, the anonymous author of the Gesta Hungarorum also finished his work with the beginning of Andrew's reign. Domanovszky also emphasized that the Hungarian chronicle used the data of Annales Altahenses up to 1046. (Note: In contrast, historian József Gerics highlighted that Anonymus tangentially mentions the 1051 German invasion of Hungary regarding the name of Vértes Hills, while there is no textual connection between the Hungarian chronicles and Alberic's work after 1041.) Zoltán Tóth (1933) argued that the scene at Várkony (when the paralyzed Andrew forces his rebellious brother, Béla to choose between the crown and the sword) reflects the coronation ordo of Ecgbert of York, which thus marks the period before the German influence that can be attributed to the time of Solomon, i.e. this chapter was written during the reign of Andrew I. (Note: Gyula Kristó, in contrast, considered the Ecgbert ordo remained in use until the end of the Árpád era, and there is no data on the exact order of the king's coronations, so this chapter could have been written down at any time.)

Initially, György Györffy (1948) also expressed that the ancient gesta or the Gesta Ungarorum (as he called) was compiled during the reign of Andrew I, and was later expanded at the time of the rule of Ladislaus I. Györffy argued that Anonymus, Alberic, Riccardus, the Annales Posonienses and the Illuminated Chronicle all utilized this chronicle and its 12th-century continuation. Literary historian János Győry (1948) argued the influence of the Annales Altahenses can be detected within the text of the Hungarian chronicle tradition up to only 1046. Győry considered that Andrew I ordered the Urgesta to be written to reinforce his own legitimacy after a turbulent period (civil wars, German incursions and the Vata pagan uprising). After 1047, the newly crowned Andrew strengthened the royal power and the later chapters of the chronicle textual tradition can no longer be linked to his name.

Classical philologist János Horváth, Jr. (1954) claimed that Nicholas, Bishop of Győr, who formulated the establishing charter of the abbey of Tihany, was the author of the Urgesta, due to stylistic similarities. (Note: When analyzing the establishing charter, Horváth discovered signs of historiographical skills to its formulator. Gyula Kristó emphasized this, however, was typical of the style of 11th century diplomas, which were still on the border between orality and emerging literacy. Tibor Szőcs argued the chronicler could not use the diplomas during his work, since few copies were made of them and they were not public.) Horváth analyzed that this author wrote the gesta until the death of Andrew I and frequently used rhythmic prose, which is less typical of the later parts of the chronicle text. The chronicler reports in detail on the German–Hungarian wars of the 1050s, unlike the foreign works (e.g. Annales Altahenses). Horváth argued that Nicholas – beside charters and peace documents, partly edited by him – utilized oral reports for his Urgesta. He also included his own experiences, as he was a contemporary of the events (i.e. the pagan uprising). The text summarizes the events chronologically at one point, which may mark the end of the original text of the ancient gesta. (Note: József Gerics placed this date to the year 1059.) János Győry sharply criticized Horváth's conclusions on several points. In contrast, literary historian Tibor Klaniczay (1964) accepted the arguments claiming that the first gesta author recorded the events from the last regnal years of Stephen I until the 1051 German–Hungarian war. (Note: Lajos J. Csóka disagreed with the identity of the gesta's authorship: he argued if Nicholas, who survived the pagan uprising, had been the author, he would not have portrayed the past of Hungarians before Christianity in a positive light. The anti-German sentiment also excludes the authorship of Nicholas, since Andrew was already considered an ally of the Germans against his brother Béla after the birth of his son Solomon in 1053.) After a couple of decades, György Szabados (2010s) was the first scholar, who considered that the Urgesta was compiled during the reign of Andrew I. He argued already before the end of the 11th century, several stylistic changes in content can be observed, which presupposes the existence of an earlier ancient chronicle than the turn of the 11–12th centuries.

==== Solomon (r. 1063–1074) ====
Gyula Sebestyén (1904) was the first scholar, who considered the Urgesta was compiled during the reign of Solomon. Jenő Vértesy (1905) argued a national chronicle had to be born before the canonization of St. Ladislaus. He considered the rivalry between Solomon and Béla's sons was narrated by a contemporary chronicle. Géza Nagy (1908) shared this latter viewpoint. He emphasized the contemporary author spoke out against those, who claimed that Andrew, Béla and Levente were the illegitimate sons of Vazul and deliberately named Ladislaus the Bald as their father. Nagy said this Urgesta centered around Solomon (he called Solomon's Chronicle) and its narration lasted until 1087, the exiled king's presumed death. The second part of the chronicle (its first continuation) lasted from the 1091 Cuman invasion of Hungary to the reign of Géza II.

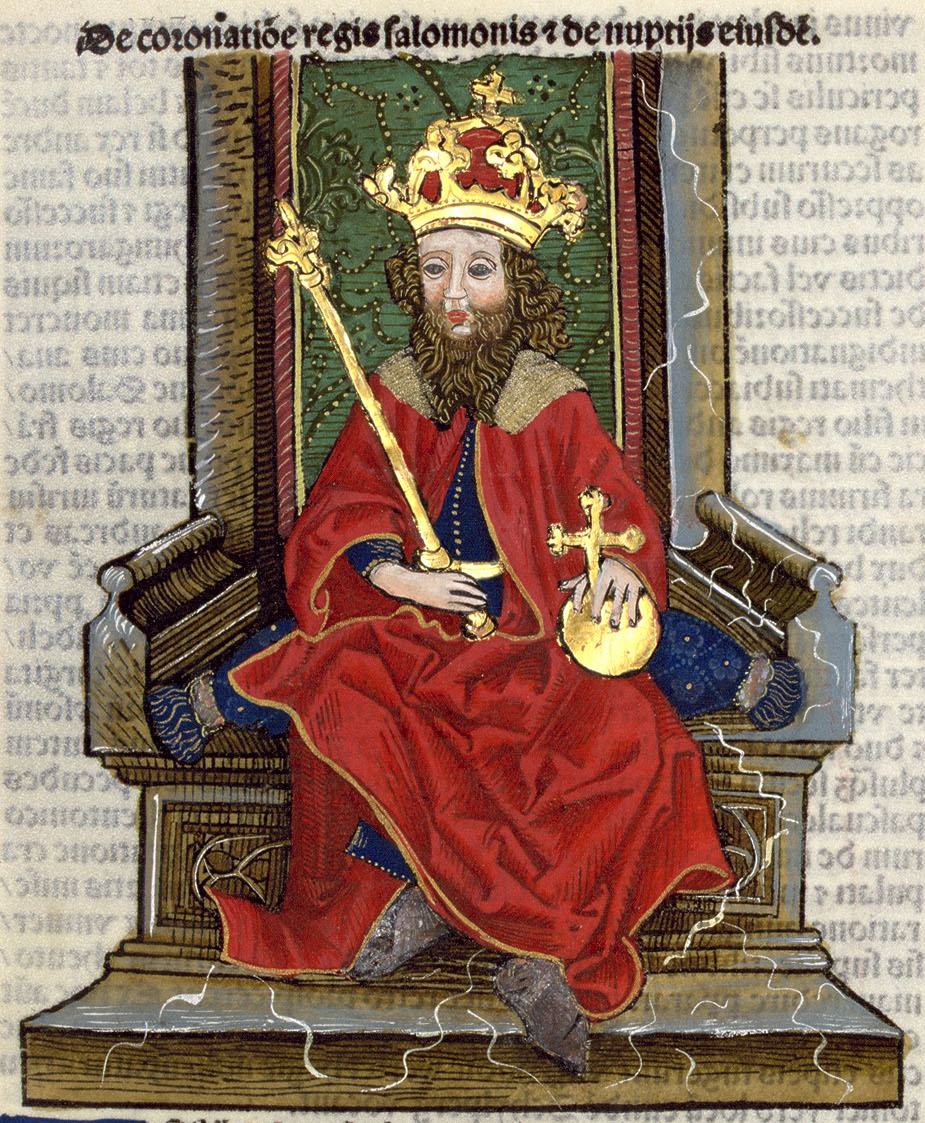
Solomon as depicted in the 15th-century Chronica Hungarorum

According to József Gerics (1961), the longer version of the hagiography of St. Stephen (written before 1083), already utilized the text of the ancient gesta, especially regarding the narration of Koppány's revolt. The hagiography formulated its narration of the 1030 German–Hungarian war by using phrases from the chronicle's chapter which tells the 1051 German invasion of Hungary. (Note: Gábor Thoroczkay listed differences between the two narratives, arguing that it is more about a literary motif that exists throughout Europe.) Gerics, discovered double and mutually exclusive talk by a part of the chronicle text, which puts the monarchs under different judgments, such as Béla I and Solomon. Gerics considered the Urgesta was compiled around 1066 or 1067, and its last chapter was the consecration of the Zselicszentjakab Abbey in that year. László Veszprémy agreed with Gerics, considering that the author of the Legenda maior may have known an early version of the primary chronicle, and by the 1080s there was a written tradition of earlier German–Hungarian wars.

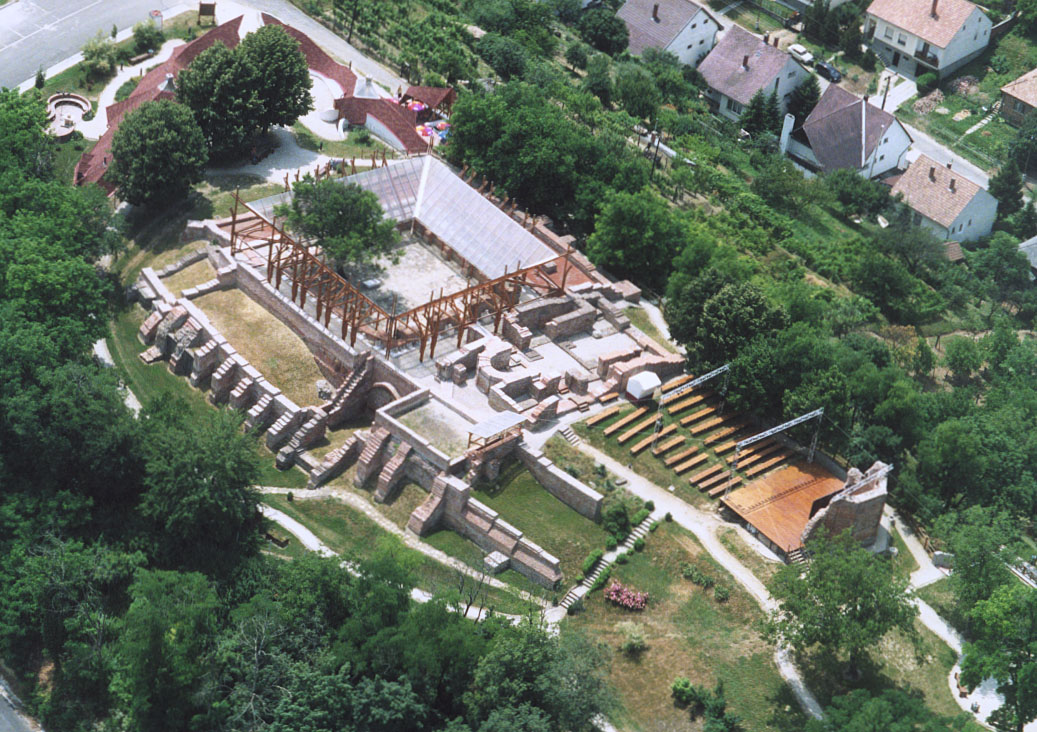
Ruins of Zselicszentjakab Abbey

Elemér Mályusz (1967) considered that the first Hungarian historical summary was created sometime in the middle of the 11th century, whose ecclesiastical author had a Western education. The Urgesta's political goal was to present the legitimacy of the ruling Árpád dynasty and their role in the Christianization of Hungary. Mályusz also identified Bishop Nicholas of Győr as the author of the gesta but (unlike Horváth) placed its compilation to the early regnal years of Solomon. Lajos J. Csóka (1967) considered the mid-14th century Chronicon Zagrabiense and Chronicon Varadinense prove the existence of an ancient gesta during the reign of Solomon. These works utilized the Urgesta, but later data, however, are inaccurate and superficial. Csóka argued the Urgesta was compiled by a Benedictine friar in the Abbey of Pannonhalma. Authors of the Annales Altahenses received an extract of this chronicle. According to Csóka, the Urgesta was written sometime before 1070 and its text contained the martyrdom of bishops and other clerics, the proper date of death of Stephen I. Csóka argued the lesser legend of the first Hungarian king (Legenda minor) utilized the text of the Urgesta, this is where the philological connection with the Annales Altahenses can be traced. The scholar claimed the Benedictine author compiled the gesta most likely in the late 1060s. He started his work with the 970s, the first Christian missions to Hungary, and closed his chronicle with an important event for his ecclesiastical order, the foundation of the Zselicszentjakab Abbey.

Historian Kornél Szovák (2004) argued the Urgesta was written in the early regnal years of Solomon, when his relationship with the sons of Béla I was still considered cooperative. He considered the chronicle had to be written before the Battle of Kerlés (1068). Szovák argued the chronicler represented the legitimist standpoint, presenting that Solomon was crowned and anointed king lawfully by his father in 1057 or 1058. This author collected all myths and legends connected to the early Hungarians and the Árpád dynasty (e.g. Hunor and Magor, Emese and Botond). Szovák argued the chronicler perceived the contrast between the person of Saint Stephen and the later rulers (descendants of the blinded Vazul), thus made Gisela of Hungary, Stephen's wife, as a scapegoat, blaming her intrigues behind the confrontation between Stephen and his cousin. The author intentionally made Ladislaus the Bald as the father of Andrew, Béla and Levente. The author used the 7th-century Exordia Scythica and the late 9th-century Regino of Prüm's Chronicon, as primary sources.

==== Ladislaus I (r. 1077–1095) ====
Modifying his former standpoint (see above), Gyula Pauler (1899) considered the ancient gesta was compiled during the reign of Ladislaus I. According to the historian, it narrated the history of Béla's branch until 1091, including the rivalry between Andrew and Béla, the history of the Ják kindred and the heroism of Opos the Brave. Historian Ubul Kállay (1915) claimed the author of the Urgesta was court chaplain Koppány (Cupan), descendant of Vecelin and member of the Ják kindred. Kállay considered that Koppány wrote the gesta sometime around 1090, on the occasion of the canonization of St. Stephen.

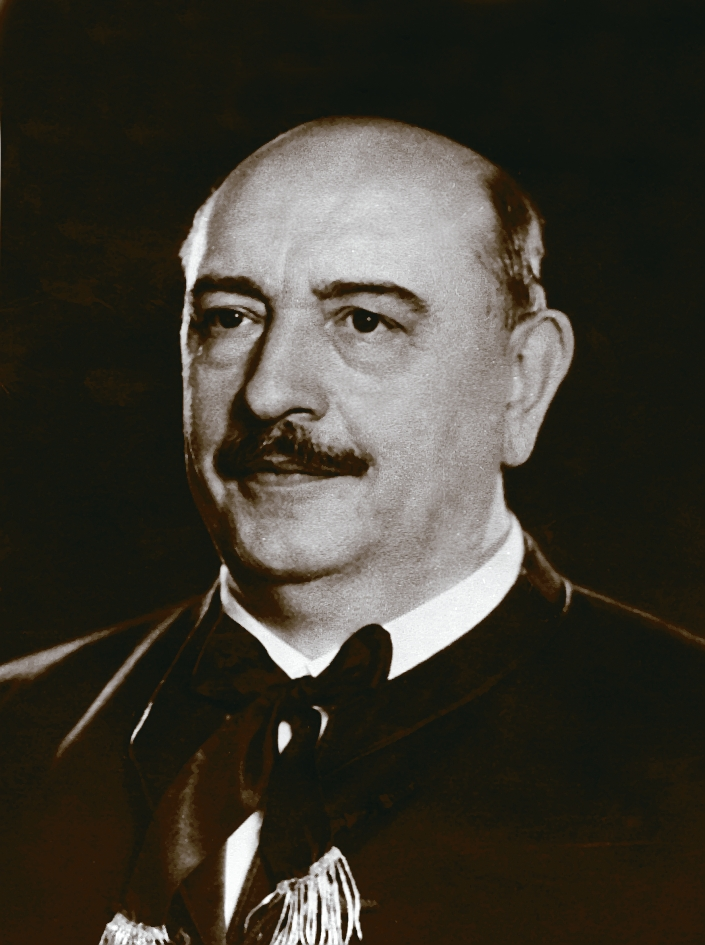
Bálint Hóman, author of the first academic monograph about the Urgesta (1925)

The most prominent historian who argued in favor of the ancient gesta from the age of Ladislaus, was the interwar-era politician and scholar Bálint Hóman (1925). He called this work as Gesta Ungarorum or Gesta Ladislai regis, since Hóman referred to the Illuminated Chronicle, which states that "whoever delights to know how many and how great were the good works wrought for his people by the blessed Ladislaus, will find full account of his deeds". He considered this work identical with the first Hungarian chronicle. Hóman argued the original text of the ancient gesta can be determined from the 13th-century chronicle of Alberic of Trois-Fontaines. The extracts of this ancient source were the three chronicles, which were compiled in Zagreb, Várad (today Oradea, Romania) and Somogyvár, all three churches were founded by Ladislaus I. Hóman also proved the existence of coinage under Béla I (which is mentioned in the 14th-century chronicle text) with metrology. Hóman also highlighted that Ladislaus styled himself as "king of the Hungarians and of Messia", and the latter term also appears in the chronicle (32nd chapter). Accepting Kállay's claim, Hóman argued the author of the Gesta Ungarorum was court chaplain Koppány Ják. The chronicler narrated the history of Hungary until Ladislaus' campaign against Croatia in 1091. Hóman considered the work contained the narration of Béla's lineage, the origin of the Hungarians. The chronicler utilized the text of the Annales Altahenses until the year 1063. Hóman argued the Gesta Ungarorum was a chivalrous gesta adopting the French model, and its style is distinct from the later parts of the chronicle text. (Note: Several historians contested Hóman's theory. János Győry argued there is no philological connection between the Hungarian chronicle text and the Annales Altahenses. Győry also considered the phrase "full account of his deeds" is identical with the Saint Ladislaus legend, and the Latin word "gesta" is not a title here. László Geréb argued there is no sign of the existence of a literary life during the reign of Ladislaus I. After analyzing the chronicle text in the period from 1051 to 1063, József Gerics emphasized there is no philological connection with the Annales Altahenses. The same applies to the work of Alberic after the year 1041.)

József Deér (1937) and Péter Váczy (1938) accepted Hóman's theory. Polish historian Marian Plezia (1947) analyzed the parallels between the chronicle of Gallus Anonymus and the earliest Hungarian chronicle text. He found similarities between the narrations of the deaths of Bolesław I the Brave and Stephen I of Hungary. He accepted Hóman's theory about the dating and authorship of the ancient gesta, but later he modified his viewpoint (see below). British academic Carlile Aylmer Macartney (1953) argued the ancient gesta which was written in the court of Ladislaus I sometime between 1080 and 1090, was used as a primary source for the longer legend of Gerard of Csanád, the works of chroniclers Simon of Kéza, Thomas Ebendorfer and Jan Długosz regarding the history of the 11th century. Macartney considered the cleric author was of Hungarian ethnicity, who utilized oral traditions and folk legends. He aimed to present Ladislaus as the rightful monarch of Hungary. Macartney assumed a hard-line anti-German sentiment to the chronicler. Linguist János Bollók (1986) accepted Hóman's argument, when analyzed the virtues of Saint Emeric of Hungary in the chronicle text.

==== Coloman (r. 1095–1116) ====
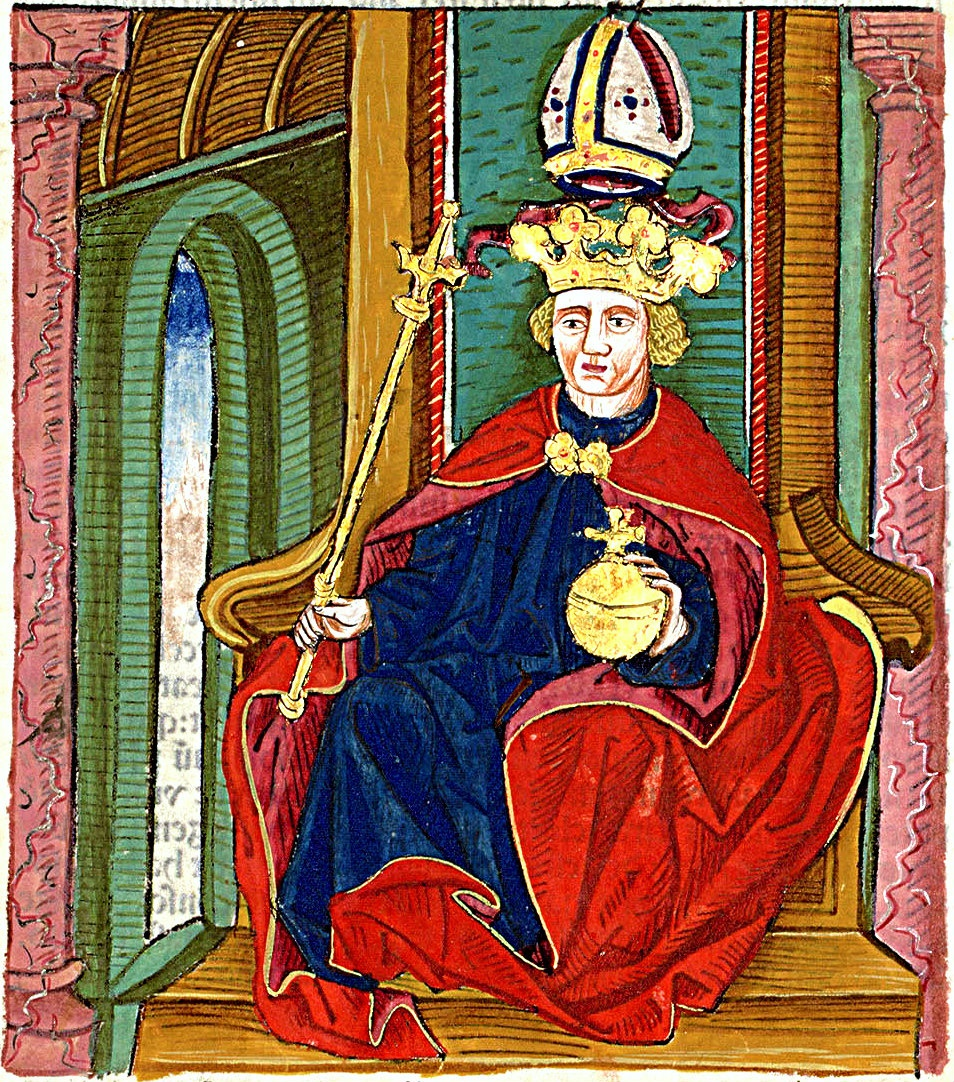
Coloman depicted in János Thuróczy's Chronicle of the Hungarians

According to Austrian scholar Raimund Friedrich Kaindl (1893), two gestas were compiled in the late 11th century. The first one, called as Gesta Vetera Hungarorum by Kaindl, narrated the history of Hungary in short records until the death of Ladislaus I in 1095, while the second one was created around 1100 and contained a detailed narration from the reign of Andrew I to Ladislaus I. Literary historian László Geréb (1950) considered that the literary life first appeared at Coloman's court in Hungary. During this time, the king acted as patron of the hagiographies, collections of laws, liturgical texts that were created at that time. Marian Plezia (1959), modifying his former standpoint, also argued that the first chronicle was written at the turn of the 11th and 12th centuries.

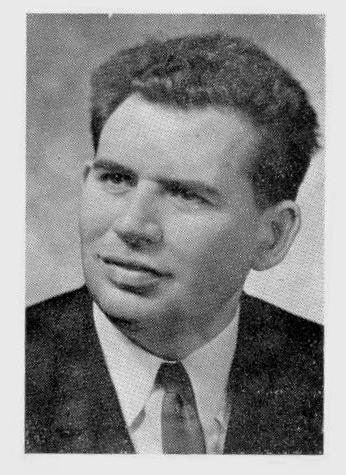
Historian Gyula Kristó

György Györffy modified his standpoint by the end of the 1960s. Citing contemporary royal charters, he introduced the theory of 70-year historical memory limit, thus, the first chronicle can be dated to the time of Coloman. Györffy emphasized the Urgesta begins to provide a detailed sequence of events from the beginning of the 1030s, from which it follows that the chronicle was written around 1100. The historian thought he discovered a similar memory limit in the case of the Polish and Bohemian chronicles too (Gallus Anonymus and Cosmas of Prague, respectively). (Note: Györffy's theory regarding the 70-year memory limit was widely criticized by György Szabados, who emphasized that the Hungarian chronicle is the personal history of the Hungarian kings, of whose entourage there is no demonstrable member who would have lived to the age of 50. In any case, the style of several authors can be discovered in the text of the chronicle, Szabados argued.) Gyula Kristó (1994) attempted to reconstruct the content of the first Hungarian chronicle. According to the historian, the Urgesta contained the Christianization of Hungary and the theological aspects of the Christian faith. Kristó considered the first chronicle was a kind of reckoning that followed the journey of Hungarians becoming Christians from the time of St. Stephen. Kristó discovered philological similarities between the style of the Urgesta and the prelude of Coloman's first code. Kristó also emphasized the flourishing literary life during the reign of Coloman and highlighted that the first chronicles were compiled in Bohemia, Poland and the Rus' around the same period (early 12th century). Kristó considered the author of the first gesta was indifferent to the era of pagan Hungary, similarly to the contemporary hagiographies (e.g. Hartvik's St. Stephen legend) and the Annales Posonienses. It is possible that the chronicler began his work with Koppány's rebellion and narrated the events until Coloman with the monarchs in the centre, and were mostly short notes in chronological order. Kristó considered the author was a Hungarian-born secular clergyman, who did not receive education abroad. He utilized oral traditions and an early version of the Annales Posonienses. Kristó accepted Györffy's theory of 70-year historical memory, citing the obscure appearance of Stephen's reign in the chronicle.

László Veszprémy (2004) assumed the existence of sporadic historical records before the compilation of the first chronicle during the reign of Coloman. The chronicle text utilized the Annales Altahenses to a great extent until the year 1046. Later on, there is no longer a close philological connection between the two texts. Veszprémy cited the observation of German scholar Norbert Kersken, who argued that the beginning of the 12th century was the first highlight of chronicle literature. Beside the Central European works (see above), Veszprémy gave the Danish Chronicon Roskildense as an example. Veszprémy (just like Gerics and Csóka before that) considered the Urgesta was merely a compilation of historical records or annals-like chronicle before a large-scale reediting in the early 13th century (see below). It served as the common source for later annals, such as the Annales Posonienses and the three annals of the Formulary Book of Somogyvár. Historian Dániel Bagi (2005) argued the Urgesta was such a novel work, even though historical records existed before, that discussed Hungarian history from prehistory to the author's own time according to new theoretical aspects in accordance with Coloman's needs. Gábor Thoroczkay (2010) accepted Veszprémy's argument too about the existence of historical records which were utilized by the Urgesta in a complex chronicle during the reign of Coloman. Péter B. Kovács (2020) and classical phylologist Bernadett Benei (2022) also accepted the term "historical records". The latter highlighted that the Vata pagan uprising in 1046 and the subsequent events are given a prominent place in the text of the chronicle. She considered there was a short history text (liber) regarding these events written by an author in the 1060s at the latest who lived through the events. This text was later expanded with the reign of Stephen I in a shorter scope, possibly in the late 11th century. Under Coloman, these small historical narratives were compiled to create the Urgesta, the first Hungarian chronicle.

==== Other theories ====
Beside the above groups, there are stand-alone theories which, however, do not enjoy wide acceptance by historiography. Henrik Marczali (1880) argued the dislike for Coloman that appears in the text and the simultaneous praise of Béla II and his son Géza II prove that the first Hungarian chronicle was written under the latter's reign, sometime between 1150 and 1160, based on pre-existing historical records. Imre Madzsar (1926) analyzed the text in terms of style and form. He argued in favor of a uniform style text – preserved in the so-called Acephalus Codex – from Koppány's revolt until the campaign of Géza II against the Principality of Halych, thus the Urgesta was compiled sometime between 1156 and 1162. Madzsar considered the author was a cleric of the royal court and belonged to the Ják kindred. He frequently used Biblical phrases in his work. Several historians, including Bálint Hóman, Sándor Domanovszky and János Horváth, Jr. contested Madzsar's argument. They argued the authors of the later continuations followed the narrative style of the 11th-century Urgesta and criticized Madzsar, who did not separate the later interpolations in his study.

Benedictine historian László Erdélyi (1933) claimed that Simon of Kéza was the first chronicler in Hungary and his work, the Gesta Hunnorum et Hungarorum was the earliest source for the 14th-century chronicle composition. Erdélyi emphasized that Simon writes in his prologue that he is forced to use foreign authors because there are no domestic works available to him. Erdélyi argued that the text contains several anachronistic elements when narrated events from the 11–12th centuries (for instance, castrums, royal servants, name variants of 11th-century historical persons). József Gerics rejected Erdélyi's theory, citing that Simon of Kéza applied the lack of sources only to the Hunnic history. Gerics also refuted the anachronistic nature of the terms which Erdélyi cited, giving examples from contemporary texts from the 11–12th centuries.

Péter Rokay (1999) rejected the existence of an 11th-century Urgesta. He claimed the Illuminated Chronicle and its variants contain pure 14th-century texts without interpolations, redaction and continuations. Because of their large-scale interpolations, Rokay also questioned the authenticity of those 11th-century royal documents (e.g. the establishing charters of Tihany, Zselicszentjakab, Százd, Garamszentbenedek), whose data (names, dates) confirm the contemporaneity of the 11th century text of the chronicle. In contrast, Tibor Szőcs emphasized that modifications and falsifications typically do not affect the formulaic parts of the diplomas (including the list of dignitaries), since it was precisely these parts of the diploma that could maintain the appearance of authenticity of the interpolated diplomas.

=== 12th-century continuations ===
Whenever the Urgesta was compiled, the subsequent authors and glossators constantly continued or shortened, developed, expanded or rewrote, i.e. shaped and modernized the material to such an extent that it became completely impossible to separate and reconstruct the original texts of the ancient gesta and the continuations. Most historians agreed on this, although they all attempted to separate the various parts by determining their time of origin. Literary historian Tibor Klaniczay, representing a dissenting opinion, considered that the 11–12th century gestas were all separate works, which covered various parts of the Hungarian history, and they could even represent different views on the same topic. Thus, there was no a single royal court chronicle (i.e. Urgesta), which the chroniclers of the monarchs of different eras modified by expanding or re-editing according to their own tastes and political goals. The majority of historians do not share this viewpoint, considering that the chronicle writing in Hungary was connected to the royal court from the beginnings.

==== Coloman (r. 1095–1116) ====
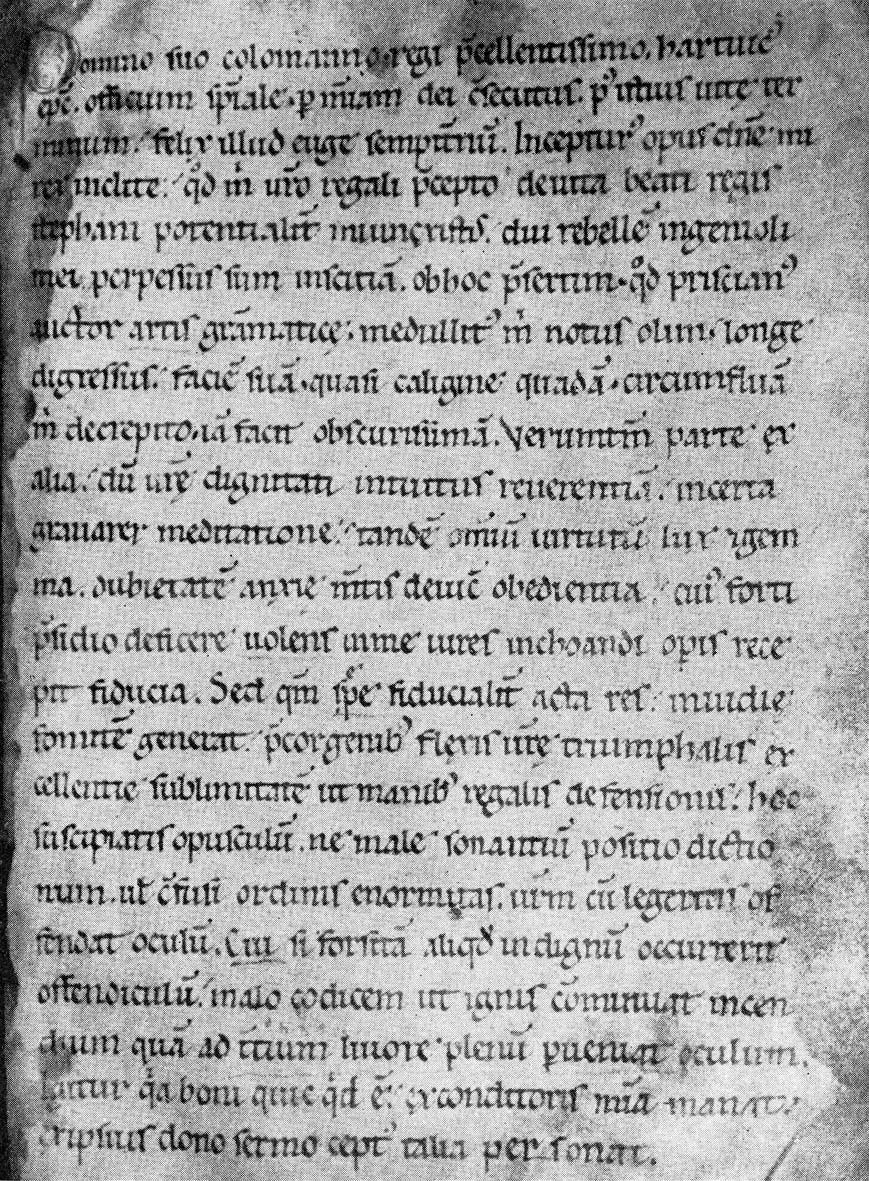
The first page of the earliest version of the Legenda Hartviciana preserved in a 12th-century codex

Majority of those historians, who assumed a creation of the ancient gesta in the 11th century, made its continuation probable during the reign of Coloman. Ferenc Toldy referred to this chronicler as "Coloman's Anonymus" who wrote the continuation in the early 12th century. Bálint Hóman and Péter Váczy considered that the 14th-century Illuminated Chronicle used the early 12th century continuation as a primary source. János Győry discovered "French influence" (e.g. the legend of Alexius of Rome regarding the origin of the Hungarians and the style of Song of Roland regarding the depiction of St. Ladislaus) in those texts, which were written around 1100 and thus those sections are distinguishable from the original text corpus. János Horváth, Jr. – accepting the argument of literary historian László Négyesy – considered the chapters, which narrate the events from the coronation of the child Solomon until the death of Ladislaus I, show a close stylistic unity. Horváth emphasized the existence of poetically beautiful details and epic historical songs in this section (the latter was already noticed by the poet János Arany in the mid-19th century). Horváth argued these epic poems, preserving oral tradition, narrated successful military campaigns in order to the glorify the Árpád dynasty and Coloman, and this text use stereotypical repetitions of epic turns and permanent epic tokens related to heroes. Horváth also discovered a slight pro-German tone, due to a possible ethnic origin of the chronicler.

József Gerics, who analyzed the corpus narrating the 11th-century events, discovered traces of later insertions (interpolations) in several places. For instance, during the birth of St. Stephen, the text refers to the later hagiographies of the monarch and his son Saint Emeric. He also considered the genealogy of the Ják kindred and the presentation of the tax child's tenth as later insertions, in addition to the contradictory genealogical data regarding the father of Andrew, Béla and Levente. According to Gerics, the Urgesta, which narrated the events until 1067, was continued and expanded during the reign of Coloman and preserved the feud between Solomon and his cousins, Géza I and Ladislaus I. Gerics was the first scholar who discovered different and contradictory judgments in connection with the three monarchs within the text of the 14th-century composition. While the 130th and 133rd chapters declare Solomon as the lawful ruler, the 120th chapter (and its derivative Chronicon Zagrabiense) emphasizes the legitimacy of Géza and Ladislaus. Gerics argued these sections were initially parts of two different works, "legitimist" and "idoneist" chronicles, respectively. The latter detailed the "celestial" Ladislaus' ability to rule, which reflects the ideology of Coloman's royal court. This phenomenon can be observed in the hagiography of St. Stephen written by Hartvik, a court cleric of Coloman, too. (Note: In contrast to Gerics, Gyula Kristó did not set the two principles in exclusive opposition to each other. He argued, for instance, that "idoneist" elements can be observed in earlier texts too, e.g. the Christian abilities of Saint Stephen, while the principle "legitimism" was just as important for Coloman and his court against the claim of his younger brother Álmos, who represented "idoneist" characteristics against the monarch with a physical defect. Dániel Bagi introduced the term "potestas" to the Hungarian historiography, which implies that only a capable ("idoneist") monarch was considered a legitim ruler in medieval Europe, thus the two characteristics cannot be separated from each other. Bagi argued the dynasty affairs in the second half of the 11th century is narrated through the aspect of the Investiture Controversy, which reached its peak during the reign of Coloman.) Historian Elemér Mályusz accepted Gerics' argument and considered that the Urgesta was continued in the early 12th century, under the guidance of Coloman, and in the centre of that continuation is St. Ladislaus (as a result, Mályusz called this expansion as "Gesta Ladislai regis") and its tone is sharply anti-Solomon. Mályusz claimed this text utilized songs in Hungarian and oral folk traditions. The chronicler also inserted the text of the Urgesta in order to mitigate its basic anti-German perception.

==== Stephen II (r. 1116–1131) ====
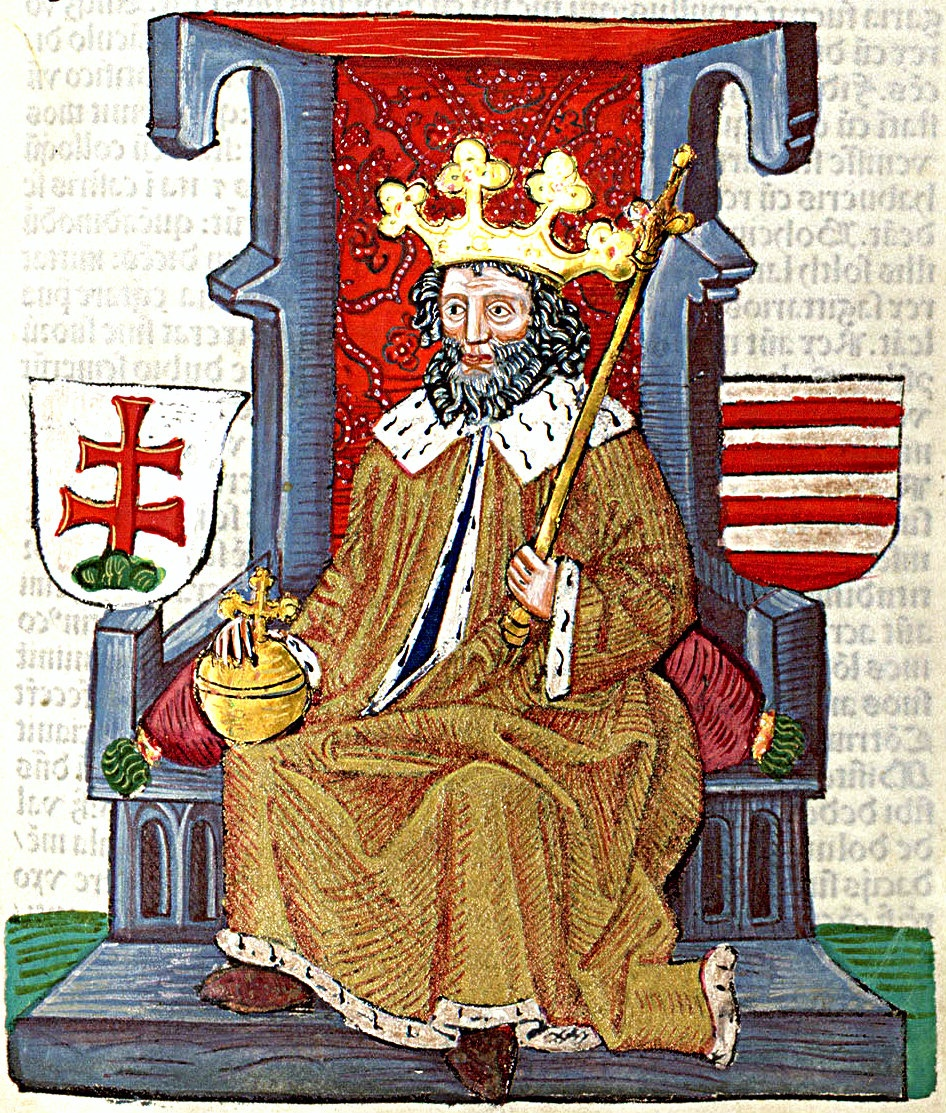
Stephen II depicted in János Thuróczy's Chronicle of the Hungarians

The 14th-century chronicle composition preserved an unfavorable image of Coloman, his son Stephen II and their rule (for the causes, see below), but a remnant of an earlier text can be found in some places where the two monarchs appear in a positive light. Consequently, Sándor Domanovszky assumed a continuation written under the reign of Stephen II too. He discovered the text of the Acephalus Codex about Stephen's Byzantine campaign preserved a more original text than the other 14th-century chronicle variants. This codex does not mention those parts where Stephen II appears in an unfavorable light. Other scholars – Bálint Hóman, Péter Váczy and József Deér – also accepted Domanovszky's view. According to Deér, the Urgesta was first continued by an unknown chronicler under the reign of Stephen II and narrated the history of Hungary until the year 1127. József Gerics emphasized that only the Acephalus Codex provides the proper date of Stephen's ascension to the Hungarian throne, which strengthens the existence of a continuation when Stephen II was still alive.

Gyula Kristó argued that only the Acephalus Codex preserved the original text of the "Stephen II continuation" without any interpolations. This work started from Stephen's coronation (1116) and lasted until 1127, thus it can be considered a contemporary record. To the direction of the king, its tone was basically objective, with glorification occasionally, which excludes that the text was created later. The text does not mention Stephen's military defeats against the Duchy of Bohemia and the Republic of Venice. Kristó argued the death circumstances of Béla I was preserved by this continuation because of its "legitimist" tone. Kristó also attributed the 152nd chapter to this continuation.

==== Álmos branch (r. 1131–1172) ====
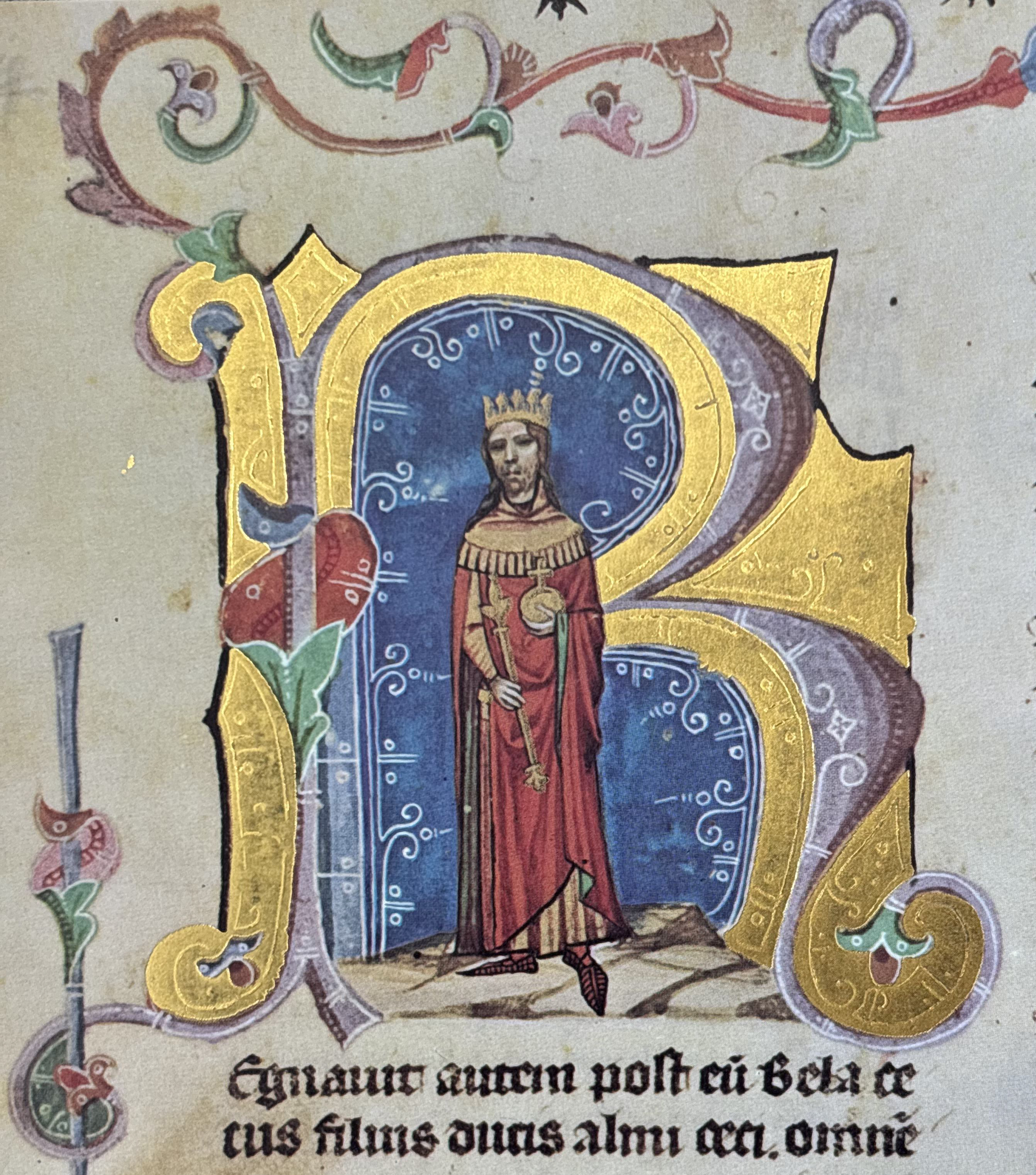
Béla II (r. 1131–1141)

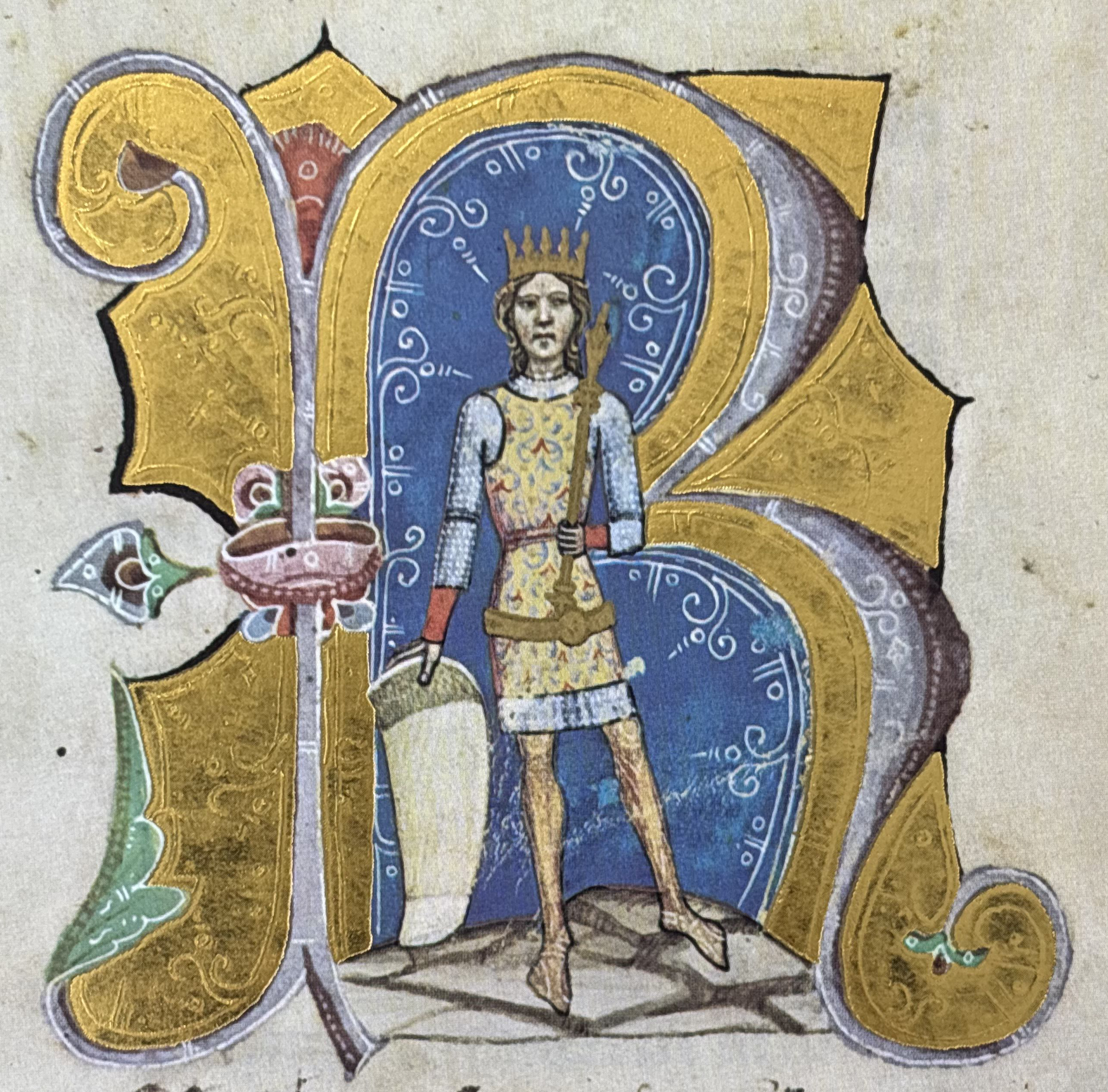
Géza II (r. 1141–1162)

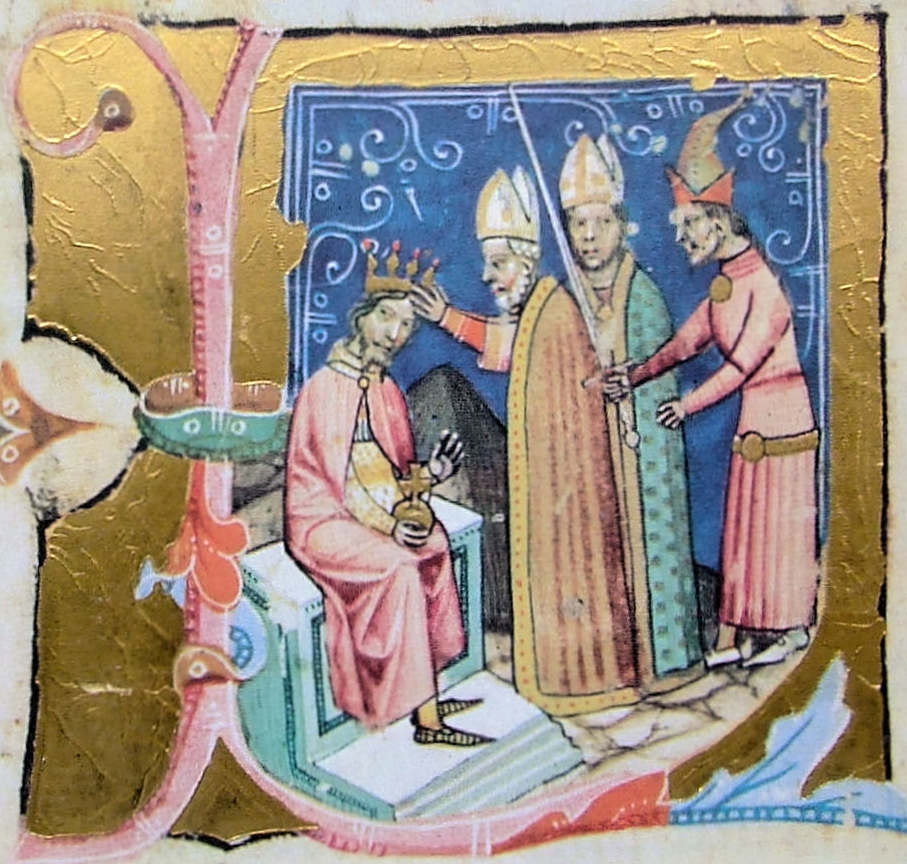
Stephen III (r. 1162–1172)

Following the death of Stephen II, his cousin Béla II ascended the throne in 1131. At the age of five, he was blinded alongside his father Álmos upon the order of Coloman after series of rebellions by his brother against his rule. Therefore, expansions and interpolations of the chronicle text under Béla II and his descendants preserved an unfavorable image of Coloman and Stephen II. This negative view was a form of "revenge" by Álmos' branch, who persuaded their chroniclers to emphasize Coloman's failures and to hide his successes.

Ferenc Toldy considered that the chronicle written under Coloman was continued under the reign of Géza II (Béla's son), narrating history until the year 1148, when Géza's war against Halych took place. The text, namely, does not mention the Byzantine–Hungarian War lasted from 1149 to 1155, and the rebellion of Géza's brothers. Toldy argued the text refers to Stephen II as "Stephen the Lesser" (after St. Stephen I), therefore it can be ruled out that the text was created during the reign of Stephen III. Gyula Pauler, however, put the date of this chronicle to the last regnal years of Béla II. Gyula Sebestyén considered the Urgesta (written under Solomon, according to him) was continued around 1132, shortly after Béla's coronation. It was written on the occasion of the wedding of Hedwig (Béla's sister) and Duke Adalbert of Austria in order to strengthen the Austro-Hungarian relations. The author's goal was to justify the legal claim of the Álmos branch. Sebestyén claimed that several parts of the 11th-century events, in which Géza I and Ladislaus I are displayed in positive color (e.g. establishment of the Vác Cathedral, the Battle of Kemej or Vid Gutkeled's intrigues), were recorded by Béla II's chronicler, using the poetic devices of naive epic. According to Sebestyén, another chronicler continued this chronicle under Géza II, but at a much lower standard. Based on Henry of Mügeln's Ungarnchronik, which preserved unique elements about the history of mid-12th-century Hungary, this text lasted until the death of Stephen III (1172). Géza Nagy accepted Sebestyén's viewpoint. He argued the chronicler compiled his chronicle (the first continuation of Solomon's ancient gesta) in 1132; Béla II appears as a living person in the text. This "second chronicle" started the text from the 1091 incursion of the Cumans and narrated the reigns of Coloman and Stephen II in detail. Subsequently, this chronicle was expanded with short records during the reigns of Géza II and Stephen III. János Karácsonyi identified Béla's chronicler with John, son of Both, who functioned as a royal notary and provost of Dömös. As a confidant of Álmos, John preserved the detailed story of the blinding of the prince and his five-year-old son.

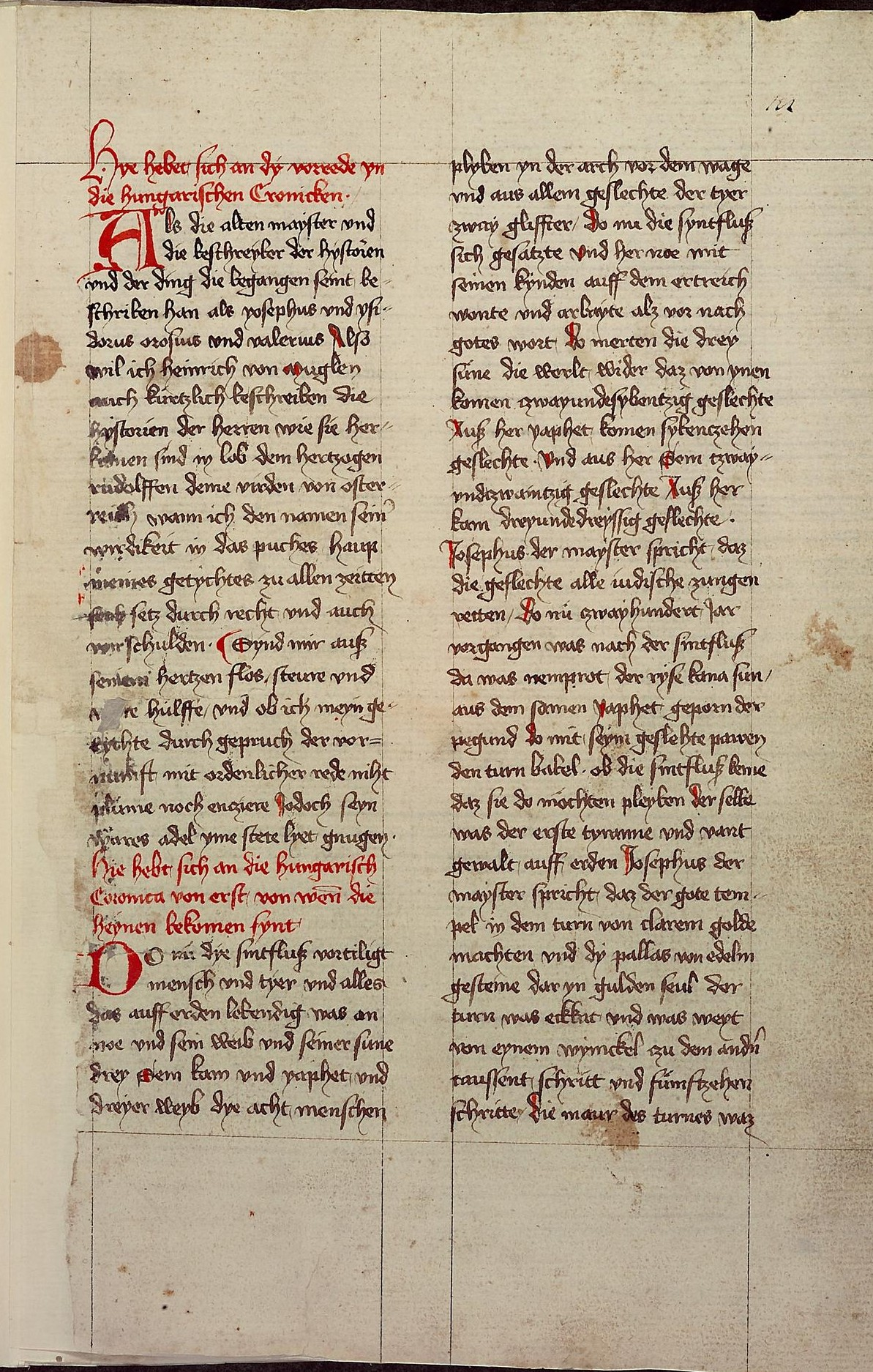
Page (18r) of Henry of Mügeln's Ungarnchronik

Bálint Hóman argued the Urgesta (which was already expanded under Stephen II) was extended and reedited by a chronicler under Béla II or Géza II, sometime between 1131 and 1152, in order to denigrate Coloman. However, this chronicler did superficial work, so adjectives contrary to his intention (especially regarding Stephen II) could remain in the text. This work was continued under Stephen III to, until the year 1167; this version was utilized by Henry of Mügeln later. This chronicler, as Hóman emphasized, completely neglected objectivity regarding the reign of Coloman and Stephen II. Sándor Domanovszky accepted the standpoints of Pauler and Hóman. József Deér and Péter Váczy agreed that a continuator revised the original chronicle text in order to represent Coloman and his son in a negative context and continued the work until the year 1152. Another author continued this text until 1167, under Stephen III. János Győry considered the myth of Sicambria (Attila's legendary capital) first appeared in Géza's continuation. C. A. Macartney also assumed "at least one writer" from the mid-12th century, who followed the direct tradition of the Urgesta and his expansion dealt with dynastic affairs. He argued this chronicler wrote a lot of negativity about Coloman and Stephen II, but he did not silence their merits either (thus Macartney did not count on a previous edit in the courts of the aforementioned kings).

In contrast to the pre-WW2 historians, János Horváth, Jr. claimed that a single chronicle expanded the chronicle text (first continued under Coloman) during the reign of Stephen III (chapters 141–167), in order to defame Coloman and Stephen II. The tone of the previous, objective and loyal chronicle, even with opponents, was replaced by a partisan, insulting style. This author was thoroughly versed in the Bible and canon law, and possibly studied in France. His style was characterized by ironic crude humor and was determined to exaggerate the surprising twists within the narrations. He often used dialogues (in rhythmic prose) in the text, even interrupting the unity of the narrative. Horváth considered that this chronicler completely revised the text from the last regnal years of Ladislaus I. Elemér Mályusz accepted Horváth's theory. He argued that part, which emphasizes Solomon's legitimacy against Géza and Ladislaus, was written under Stephen III, who had to fight against his rebellious uncles, Ladislaus II and Stephen IV. József Gerics also argued in favor of a continuation under Stephen III. The main purpose of this work was to emphasize legitimacy and the right to the crown. Therefore the compilator inserted that text which implies that Géza I said that he had sinned because he had possessed himself of the kingdom of a lawfully crowned king, while Ladislaus I was hesitant to succeed his brother Géza and planned to "restore the kingdom" to Solomon. This Stephen III-era legitimist ideology was preserved by Henry of Mügeln's work and the Knauz chronicles. Lajos J. Csóka considered that a Benedictine author from the Pannonhalma Abbey continued Solomon's chronicle under the reign of Stephen III. Csóka discovered philological connections between the texts of the Illuminated Chronicle and the lesser legend of Stephen I, at the center of which is this author, who expanded the chronicle until his own age and stylistically unified the previous passages. Csóka claimed this Benedictine friar put the coronation date of the first Hungarian king to the year 1000 in order to strengthen the privileges of the Pannonhalma Abbey. He also claimed that this chronicle was responsible for the well-known depictions of Stephen and Gisela, the controversial relations between Solomon and his cousins, and the story of blinding of Vazul.

Gyula Kristó agreed that the chronicle was expanded under a monarch from the Álmos branch, but only with brief records in the style of annals. In order to emphasize the legitimist ideology, this author re-draw the depictions of Solomon and his cousins, since Béla II was a legitimate ruler, but lacked the competence due to his blindness. In addition, the rules of Géza II and Stephen III were also strengthened by the status of legitimacy against the pretenders Boris, and Ladislaus II and Stephen IV, respectively.

==== Béla III (r. 1172–1196) ====
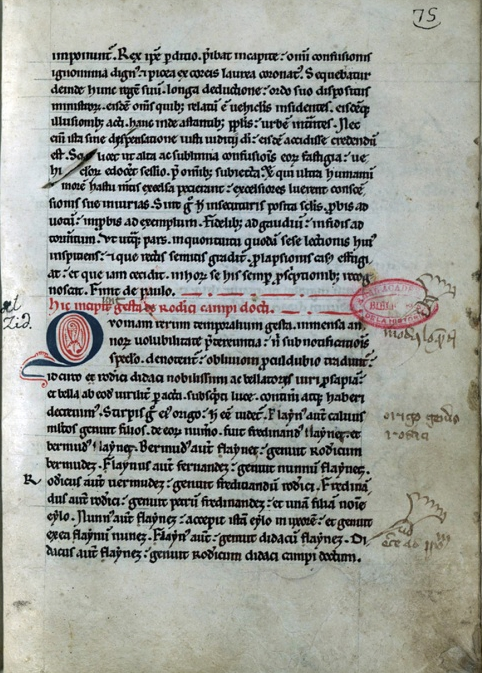
Historia Roderici, ms. 9/4922, Real Academia de la Historia, f. 75r.º

Gyula Pauler argued that an author, who functioned during the reign of Béla III, merged and edited the previously existing chronicles into one. Pauler cited identical terms and phrases in order to prove his theory. For instance, the chronicle text uses the same phrase when it explains the effect of Greek fire before the Siege of Belgrade during the 1071–1072 Byzantine–Hungarian War, then at the Battle of Haram during Stephen II's Byzantine campaign. Because of the terms "baro" and "genera", there is no way this chronicler could live before the end of the 12th century, as Pauler considered. Ladislaus I was canonized in 1192 and the chronicle refers to him as a holy king, the historian added. In contrast, Jenő Vértesy emphasized that the chronicle highlights his knightly virtues, which rather indicates that the text was written before the canonization. Other scholars – e.g. Gyula Sebestyén and László Geréb – argue there was no historiographical activity under Béla. C. A. Macartney emphasized that history writing which sought to record current events, abruptly halted in the last decades of the 12th century. There is no sign of any attempt to record contemporary history, and the reigns of Béla III and his successors until the extinction of the Árpád dynasty (except somewhat Ladislaus IV) can be reconstructed via foreign sources and official charters.

Gyula Kristó represented the viewpoint that some of Henry of Mügeln's narratives comes from a continuation which was created during the reign of Béla III. For instance, its 54–55th chapters mention that several lords defected from Stephen III to Stephen IV, because the Hungarians "could not decide which of them was the rightful king". Such a formulation would have been unthinkable during the reign of Stephen III. The mention of Béla's competence also confirms this (Béla's legitimacy was undermined by Archbishop Lucas of Esztergom's refusal to crown him). László Veszprémy discovered similarities between the Historia Roderici and the Hungarian chronicle text regarding the rule of Ladislaus I (ideal of a knight king), which was reformulated and recorded under Béla III, on the occasion of Ladislaus' canonization. In addition, as Veszprémy cited, Ladislaus' ecclesiastical representation literally quotes Gratian's law book (Decretum Gratiani), which was completed around 1140. Both Historia Roderici and Decretum Gratiani served as common sources for the Hungarian chronicle and Anonymus' Gesta Hungarorum (written around 1200), which fact strengthens the temporal proximity between the two works. Gábor Thoroczkay considered that the Saint Ladislaus legend used this Béla-era chronicle as a primary source.

=== Large-scale redaction in the early 13th century ===
==== Chronicle of Andrew II (r. 1205–1235) ====
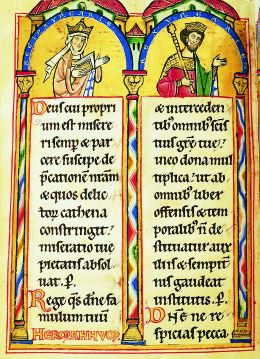
Gertrude and Andrew II in a contemporary depiction

Since the end of the 19th century, there is a widely discussed theory in Hungarian historiography that at the beginning of the 13th century, during the reign of Andrew II (r. 1205–1235), the Hungarian chronicle underwent a large degree of redaction and re-editing. Henrik Marczali noted that the existing chronicle texts do not mention the death of Saint Elizabeth of Hungary (1231) nor her canonization (1235), but her saintly way of life is explained, so a chronicle expansion could have taken place after 1227, when Louis IV, Landgrave of Thuringia died. Marczali discovered some elements of the chronicle's Hunnic story, whose demographic and geographic content could be compared with the conditions of Hungary just before the first Mongol invasion (1241). Gyula Sebestyén claimed that the chronicle under Andrew II was compiled to the occasion of the wedding of Louis and Elizabeth in 1221. He argued the text refers to the Fifth Crusade and Andrew's participation (1217–1218), but it omit to mention the Golden Bull of 1222. Gyula Pauler also argued in favor of a chronicle of Andrew II; the Chronicon Dubnicense uses present tense when mentions the wedding of Constance of Aragon and Frederick II, Holy Roman Emperor in 1209, which may be a sign of a chronicle text created at this time. Jenő Vértesy related some of the short records of the second half of the 12th century to the time of Andrew II.

Lajos J. Csóka claimed, like previously, the chronicle was compiled within the walls of the Pannonhalma Abbey in the 1210s by a Benedictine friar, who belonged to the convent of Abbot Uros of Pannonhalma. Csóka referred to the chronicler's excellent topographical local knowledge regarding the Battle of Vértes and Koppány's war in Veszprém and Somogy counties. Csóka argued the author utilized charters of the abbey to the narratives. The conflict between Solomon and his cousins (Géza and Ladislaus) was represented on that way, which served the purposes of Andrew II, who rebelled against his older brother Emeric for the Hungarian throne. During the civil war, the incumbent abbot John of Pannohalma supported Andrew's effort and the chronicle provided an ideological background for the rebellious duke, who became king in 1205. Csóka emphasized the Benedictine influence in the text of the chronicle. Accordingly, the author was well aware of the Rule of Saint Benedict and the biography of Benedict of Nursia written by Pope Gregory I.

Kornél Szovák analyzed the depiction of Saint Ladislaus in the chronicle text and argued his figure represents an idoneist attitude of a later interpolation from the late 12th century or early 13th century. Some phrases (e.g. "barones et optimes" and references to the Latin Empire and the Teutonic Order) imply that this redaction occurred during the reign of Andrew II. József Deér then László Veszprémy argued the legend of Charlemagne served as inspiration for the creation of the royal character of Ladislaus, who has the virtues of a Christian chivalrous monarch.

==== Gyula Kristó's theory ====
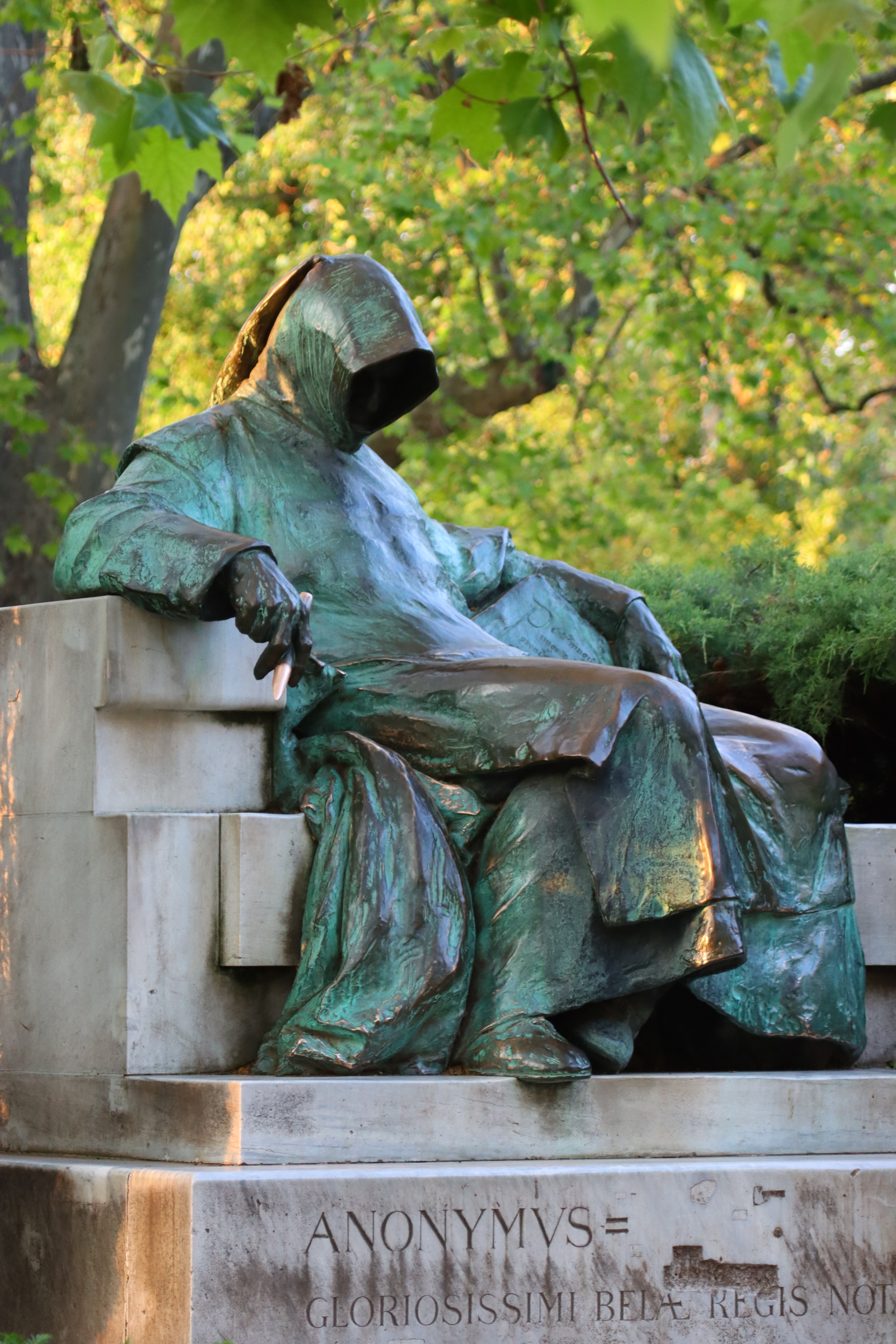
Statue of Anonymus, the author of the Gesta Hungarorum in Vajdahunyad Castle

Kristó elaborated the theory of the possibility of a complete redaction at the beginning of the 13th century in the most detailed manner, but over the decades his position changed in several matters of detail. In 1970, Kristó highlighted that a chronicler at the turn of the 12th and 13th centuries utilized Regino of Prüm's Chronicon to present pre-Christian Hungary. His contemporary Anonymus used Exordia Scythica additionally, thereby significantly modifying the presentation of Hungarian prehistory. In 1972, Kristó claimed that Anonymus used a contemporary chronicle redaction as a primary source for his Gesta Hungarorum, listing joint expressions and terms as examples appeared in the two works. In the 1972 study, Kristó argued that two redactions took place at the turn of the 12–13th centuries; the first occurred in the 1190s (under Béla III, see above), while the second one was written in the 1220–1230s in the court of Duke Béla, the son and heir of Andrew II. The latter text presented a negative image of Gisela, the consort of St. Stephen, blaming her for the intrigues against Vazul.

One Ricardus's report (1237) of a journey of a group of Dominican friars in the early 1230s refers to a chronicle, Gesta Ungarorum Christianorum ("The Deeds of the Christian Hungarians"), which contained information of an eastern Magna Hungaria. In his 1974 study, Gyula Kristó identified this work with the Hungarian chronicle written around 1235. He argued Alberic of Trois-Fontaines also utilized this chronicle in his work. Kristó considered the indicator "Christianorum" was to distinguish it from Anonymus' gesta. According to Kristó, the 1230s redaction might be centered around Duke Béla and his confidants (Béla was interested in the conversation of Cumans along the eastern borderland and had strong connections with the Dominican preachers). Kristó emphasized that Alberic represented a dark image of Gisela in his chronicle, proving that he used that redaction. During the life of Andrew II, the chronicler did not have the opportunity to write about the sins of Gertrude of Merania, who was assassinated in 1213; as a result, the author projected her perceived or real crimes onto Saint Stephen's wife Gisela, who was also of German origin. Kristó argued that the "Gesta Ungarorum Christianorum" is a uniform style work up to and including 1167, and its re-editor was a contemporary of Anonymus. Both of them plausibly studied in France. Initially Kristó considered that later chroniclers did not know the work of Anonymus, but he later revised this position, as a result of György Györffy's research results, and spoke of a double interaction between the text of the chronicle and the work of Anonymus.

Judit Csákó analyzed Kristó's theory in detail in her 2015 study. She agreed that the editing in the 13th century stylistically unified the text of the chronicle, so it is not possible to determine and separate the origin of the text sections. Because of the depiction of Gisela, Csákó assumed a redaction took place sometime after 1213, but before 1235.

=== Textual survival in 14th-century chronicles ===
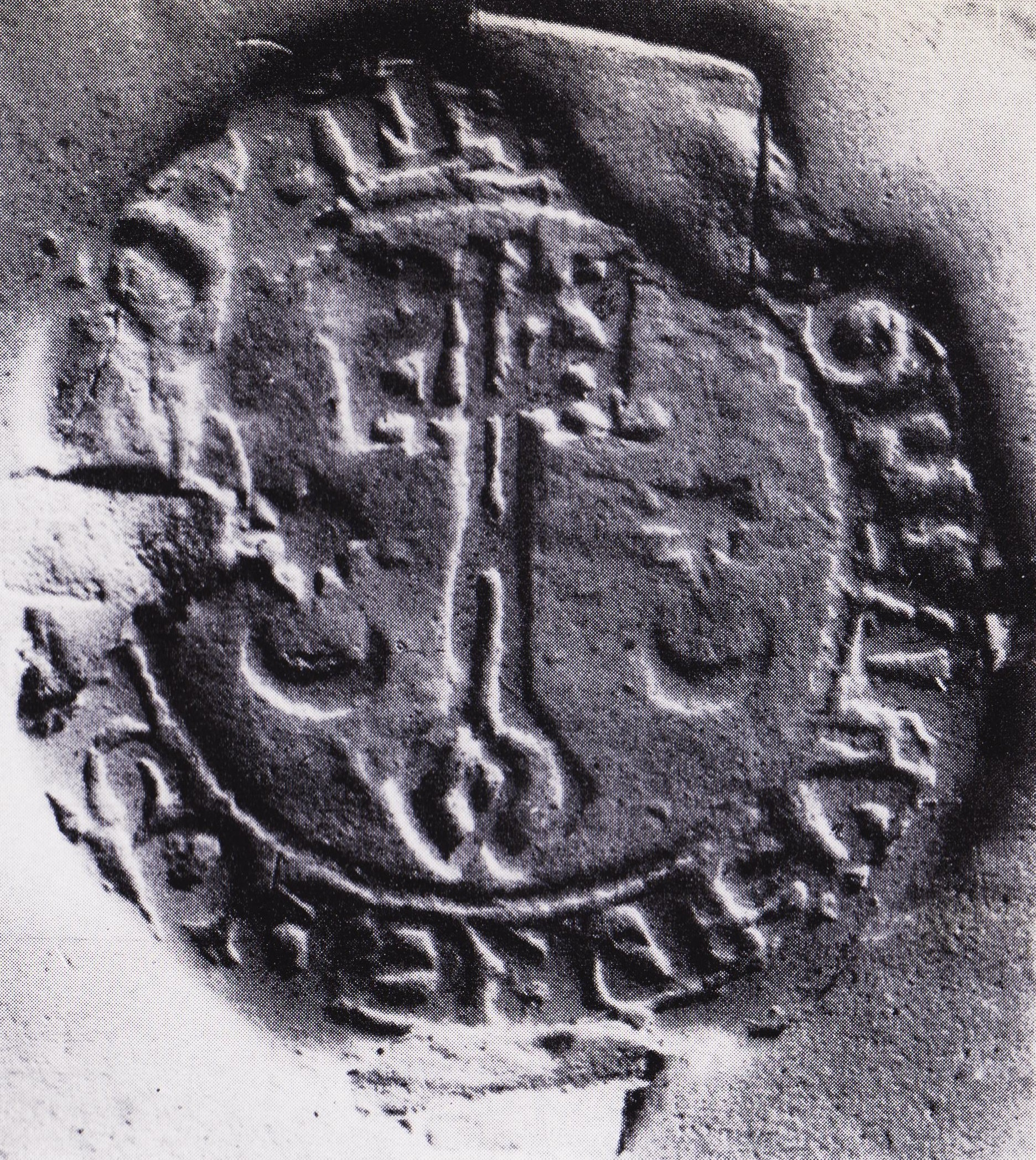
Seal of magister Ákos

György Györffy discovered that the chronicle text was continued by magister Ákos, a provost of Buda, during the reign of Stephen V (r. 1270–1272), while previously Gyula Pauler and Sándor Domanovszky had already referred to an unidentified chronicler between the ages of Anonymus and Simon of Kéza, whose some texts were preserved in the 14th-century chronicle composition. Ákos praised untruthfully highly the past and privileges of Székesfehérvár and Buda, the two churches where he functioned, and attempted to make his own kindred, the gens Ákos equal in rank with the Magyar tribes in his edition. Györffy considered that Ákos, who extracted the gesta in the Dominican nunnery at Rabbits' Island, made always notices in case of holy kings, in which hagiography could have been found a longer story about the lives of the saints, devotional constructions of churches (e.g. Vác Cathedral), consequently his abridged work could have written mainly for the holy princess Margaret, the Dominican nun. While the earlier historiography (e.g. Domanovszky, Bálint Hóman and initially Györffy) attributed the Hunnic story to him, later scholars (Imre Madzsar, Elemér Mályusz, János Horváth, Jr. and Jenő Szűcs) proved with philological and linguistic examinations that it can be considered as the own work of Simon of Kéza, who inserted the history of the Huns before the main chronicle text (the Sambucus Codex preserved most faithfully the state of the pre-Simon 13th century chronicle). Ákos' text reflects aristocratic tone, which in many cases prompted him to make anachronistic insertions (e.g. the de genere clauses in the case of 11–12th-century nobles). Regarding the 13th century, Ákos only added excerpts to the chronicle, without any relevant information, because his attention was focused on Hungarian prehistory (he preserved several legends, e.g. Lehel's horn myth).

Ákos' contemporary, Simon of Kéza plausibly obtained the Urgesta and Ákos' shorter extraction after the latter's death around 1273. Simon was a loyal court cleric of Ladislaus IV (r. 1272–1290). According to Györffy, Simon, creating his own Gesta Hungarorum (in historiography, it is also known as Gesta Hunnorum et Hungarorum) had rewritten under his own name the first chapters of the extract interpolating the history of Huns of the Attila's age as the first conquering of the Carpathian Basin. In addition, he expanded the text with last chapter of the work with the story of the victorious battles of Ladislaus IV until 1282 (the work ends with the Battle of Lake Hód) and as an appendix he acquainted some different poorer social strata. Györffy argued that Simon's work and book collection went to the Franciscans of Óbuda after his death. One of the monks (superior general John?), a supporter of the Angevin claim and Charles I (r. 1308–1342), continued Ákos' shorter gesta up to 1330 (similarly to Ákos, with minor additions between 1270–1300, but with much more detailed texts afterwards in order to support Charles' claim to the throne during the Interregnum). During the Angevin rule, the court clerics composed the existing fragmented texts into coherent works. The so-called Buda Chronicle (Chronicon Budense) family derived from Ákos' shorter gesta through its Franciscan (Minorite) continuation, while the Illuminated Chronicle (Chronicon Pictum) family preserved a longer text through the original chronicle text (Urgesta with continuations and interpolations, most recently from Ákos).

=== Identification theory with Tarih-i Üngürüs ===
The Tarih-i Üngürüs ("History of the Hungarians") is a 16th-century Ottoman chronicle, translated by diplomat Mahmud Tercüman, who originally came from a Jewish family in Vienna. According to him, the translation was based on a Latin chronicle that he found after the occupation of Székesfehérvár in 1543. Some intellectuals – Endre K. Grandpierre or József Blaskovics – considered this manuscript was identical with the Urgesta, because the Tarih-i Üngürüs, in several cases, writes about some historical events differently compared to the 14th-century chronicle composition. In contrast, translator of the critical edition of the Ottoman chronicle, György Hazai proved that the Tarih-i Üngürüs is a direct translation of Johannes de Thurocz's Chronica Hungarorum (1488). In addition, Mahmud Tercüman also added the history of Alexander the Great to the beginning of the work, based on Justin's Historiae Philippicae. Balázs Sudár emphasized that Mahmud, in addition to translation, altered the original text of the Chronica Hungarorum as an example of old Ottoman historiographical traditions, in order to ideologize the conquest of Hungary, acquiring the past through rewriting it.

== Linguistic style ==
=== Rhymed prose ===
Classical philologist János Horváth, Jr. analyzed the rhyming and rhythmic prose text of the 14th-century chronicle composition in detail in his 1954 academic thesis. In medieval literature, rhyming prose covered the period from the second half of the 10th century until the end of the 12th century. It was succeeded by rhythmic prose (also called stilus Romanus or Gregorianus) for the 13th century. However, occasionally, rhyming prose still appears in 13–14th centuries throughout Europe. Horváth considered (as mentioned above) that Bishop Nicholas wrote the Urgesta in rhyming prose at the time of Andrew I (i.e. before the era of rhythmic prose), utilizing royal charters and oral reports. Nicholas divided his rhyming prose into equal colons which are connected by rhymes at the end of colons and by side rhymes. The style is characterized by a rhetorical effect, puns, and pairs of opposites. Nicholas closed his work with a chronological summary in the late 1050s. By defining the literary style of the various chapters, Horváth believed that the time of their creation could be determined chronologically. By rhymed prose, Horváth divided the chronicle text into three parts: 63–90, 91–139 and 140–167 chapters. From the point of view of rhythmicity, Horváth also analyzed other contemporary works too, for instance Roger of Torre Maggiore's Carmen miserabile and the various hagiographies of St. Stephen.

Horváth's findings divided Hungarian historiography. János Horváth, Sr., Dezső Dercsényi, Béla Karácsonyi and József Gerics praised the thesis, but it was sharply contested by László Mezey and János Győry. Mezey criticized Horváth that he ignored content arguments in his method of investigation, which always weighs more on the lat compared to the stylistic analysis. Mezey argued the rhyming style is not suitable to be established as an epoch-marking boundary in medieval literary works. Mezey also denied the deliberate use of rhythmicity and different expressions in several aspects, instead, in many cases, imitations of existing antique European literary traditions (e.g. Cicero) appear. Horváth denied the last statement, according to him, there are fundamental differences between antique (quantity of syllables) and medieval (stress on words) rhythmic prose. He claimed that Cicero was not widely known in the era. In response, Mezey cited Ludwig Traube, who periodized the history of rhythmic prose for 1050 years (400–1450), therefore, this method is not suitable for separating sections of the Hungarian chronicle. Citing foreign literature (e.g. Max Manitius), Mezey proved that Cicero had a profound effect on medieval authors. Mezey summarized that a distinction must be made between the conscious and sporadic, occasional use of rhythmic prose (cursus). Rhythmic prose was not limited to a certain period, it is present throughout Latin-language literature, especially regarding narrative works. Horváth criticized Mezey that he deliberately confused the metric rhythmic prose of antiquity and the rhythmic prose of the Middle Ages, based on stress on words, even though both have a set of rules, the use of which could only have been conscious on the part of the chroniclers. In the latter case, the authors used only three clauses (venox, planus, tardus) by the 12th century, thus the works of Cicero and his Roman contemporaries could not be models for them. Horváth claimed there is no sign of appearance of rhythmic prose in medieval Europe before 1100. He cited German scholar Harry Bresslau, who emphasized that the historical continuity of rhythmic prose was gradually broken after the fall of the Western Roman Empire regarding narrative chroniclers and liturgical works (oratio) too.

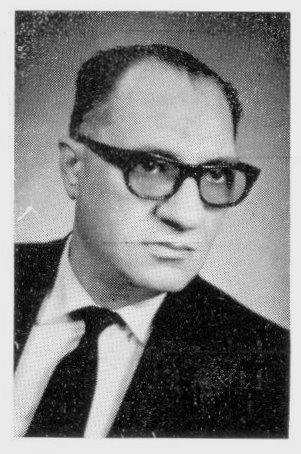
Medievalist philologist Béla Karácsonyi

János Győry completely rejected Horváth's working method and the findings of his analysis, taking into account the rife of factual errors and unfounded assumptions. He argued Bishop Nicholas was referred to as a deceased person in the 1055 establishing charter of Tihany, which excludes his authorship. Győry accused Horváth of categorizing the texts in an imaginative way, without any basis, defining them as rhyming or rhythmic prose. According to him, Horváth worked according to an outdated approach, and ignored that the number of syllables had no role in medieval rhyming prose, which is based on pure rhyme (similiter cadens) and the same number of stressed words. In his thesis, Horváth determined total of 1,250 clauses as rhyming prose. Győry disputed this for 1,017 clauses, accusing Horváth of arbitrarily creating "truncated poems". In response, Horváth gave a different definition of rhyming prose (colons of equal length instead of word stress). He wrote that one cannot speak of conscious rhythmic prose before the end of the 12th century.

In his concluding review, Béla Karácsonyi subtly hinted at personal antagonisms between the scholars (perhaps because of the awarding of the Kossuth Prize to Horváth, Jr. in 1955). Karácsonyi criticized László Mezey that he only spoke in generalities and did not provide concrete arguments and facts. Karácsonyi supported the findings of Horváth, arguing the Roman-era metric prose rhythm disappeared by the 7th century and the medieval rhythmic prose (stress on words) appeared only the end of the 12th century. Karácsonyi considered Győry's review to be subjective with full of personal attacks. He argued if academic life accepts Győry's definition of rhyming prose, according to which he wants to link its existence to the law of stress on words, there "would not be a single coherent text in world literature that could be classified as rhyming prose". In contrast, Győry's definition of bound rhythmic prose was too permissive, according to Karácsonyi. He added, after examining the text, Győry wrongly criticized Horváth's findings in many places. After 60 years, Bernadett Benei analyzed the debate that developed over Horváth's thesis. She argued his definition of the medieval rhythmic prose is in line with the international literature, which also places its appearance at the end of the 12th century. However, Benei argued that stylistic analysis alone is not sufficient, the results of other researches (e.g. historical, philological, source criticism, social history) must also be taken into account, but this was also emphasized by Horváth in his work. Gyula Kristó, who analyzed the text regarding lexicography and phraseology (see below), found that 63 percent of the chronicle text does not contain elements of rhythmic prose, thus majority of text were written before the 1240s (when rhythmic prose spread in Hungary).

=== Lexicography and phraseology ===
Imre Madzsar examined the chronicle text with the method of lexicography in 1926. As mentioned above, he found that the Urgesta has a uniform language style when narrates the events from Koppány's revolt until the reign of Géza II (36–70th chapters), thus it was compiled in the second half of the 1150s. He argued many expressions and turns of phrase can be detected in different various parts of the text, for instance, the Biblical phrase "per me reges regnant". He found altogether 56 identical terms throughout the chronicle until the mid-12th century. Madzsar realized the frequent use of Biblical phrases generally. Several historians did not accept Madzsar's findings. Bálint Hóman argued a medieval author had the same stylistic set, often taking whole texts from other works to depict similar events (e.g. battles). He also considered that a significant part of the 56 phrases are too common to draw stylistic conclusions. Sándor Domanovszky criticized Madzsar for not making a distinction between an original chronicle and an interpolated chronicle. Later continuators usually imitated the linguistic style of their predecessors. János Horváth considered that standalone phrases are not suitable for drawing conclusions, rather the wording as a whole should be the subject of the investigation.

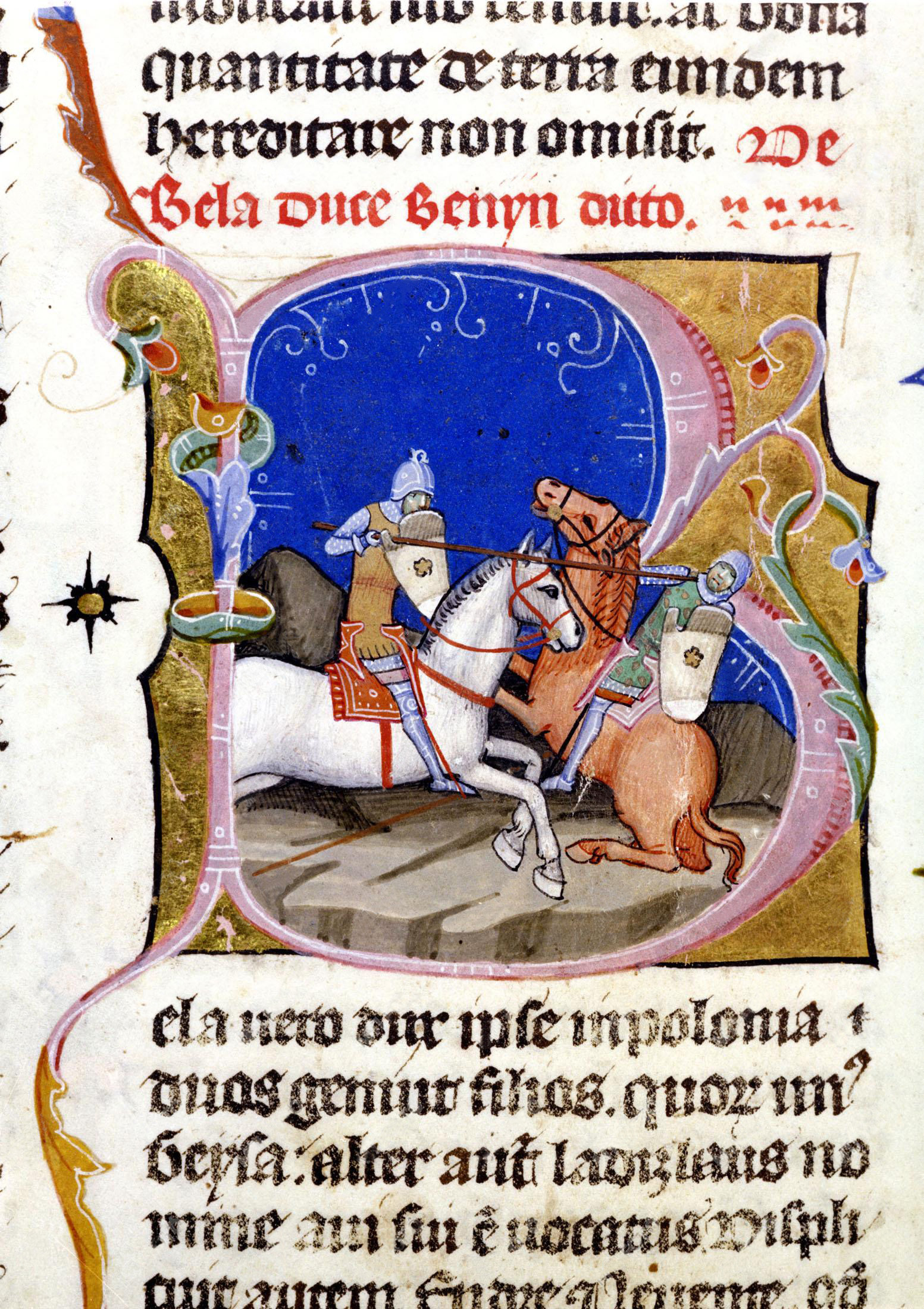
Béla I's legendary duel with the Pomeranian leader in Poland

Gyula Kristó included Anonymus' gesta in the phraseological studies as a control text. Both the Hungarian chronicle and the Gesta Hungarorum contain chivalrous elements and phrases (e.g. fides, largitas, audacia and gloriosus). Both works projected knightly virtue back to much earlier times (e.g. the era of Hungarian land-taking). Dániel Bagi analyzed the story of Duke Béla's duel with a Pomeranian warrior: he found contemporary parallels – Galbert of Bruges' chronicle and Donizo's Vita Mathildis. Consequently, descriptions of duels in medieval chronicles preceded the heyday of chivalric literature, but the epic representation allows to conclude that this part of the text was created after the beginning of the 12th century. Both Anonymus and the Urgesta mention foreigners with condemning epithets. The former refers to the Vlachs and Slavs of Transylvania with the indicator vilis ("vile"), while the latter uses the same phrase to the Pechenegs and the Székelys. The terms superbia or superbus also appear in both works relating to the foreigners. The topos furor Teutonicus ("German fury") appears in the chronicle text five times; it reflects the author's studies in France. Kristó emphasized that antipathy towards foreigners only appeared in Hungary at the beginning of the 13th century. In addition, Kristó also considered that the phrase "de genere [name]" has an age-determining role, since this term appears only contemporary records since 1208.

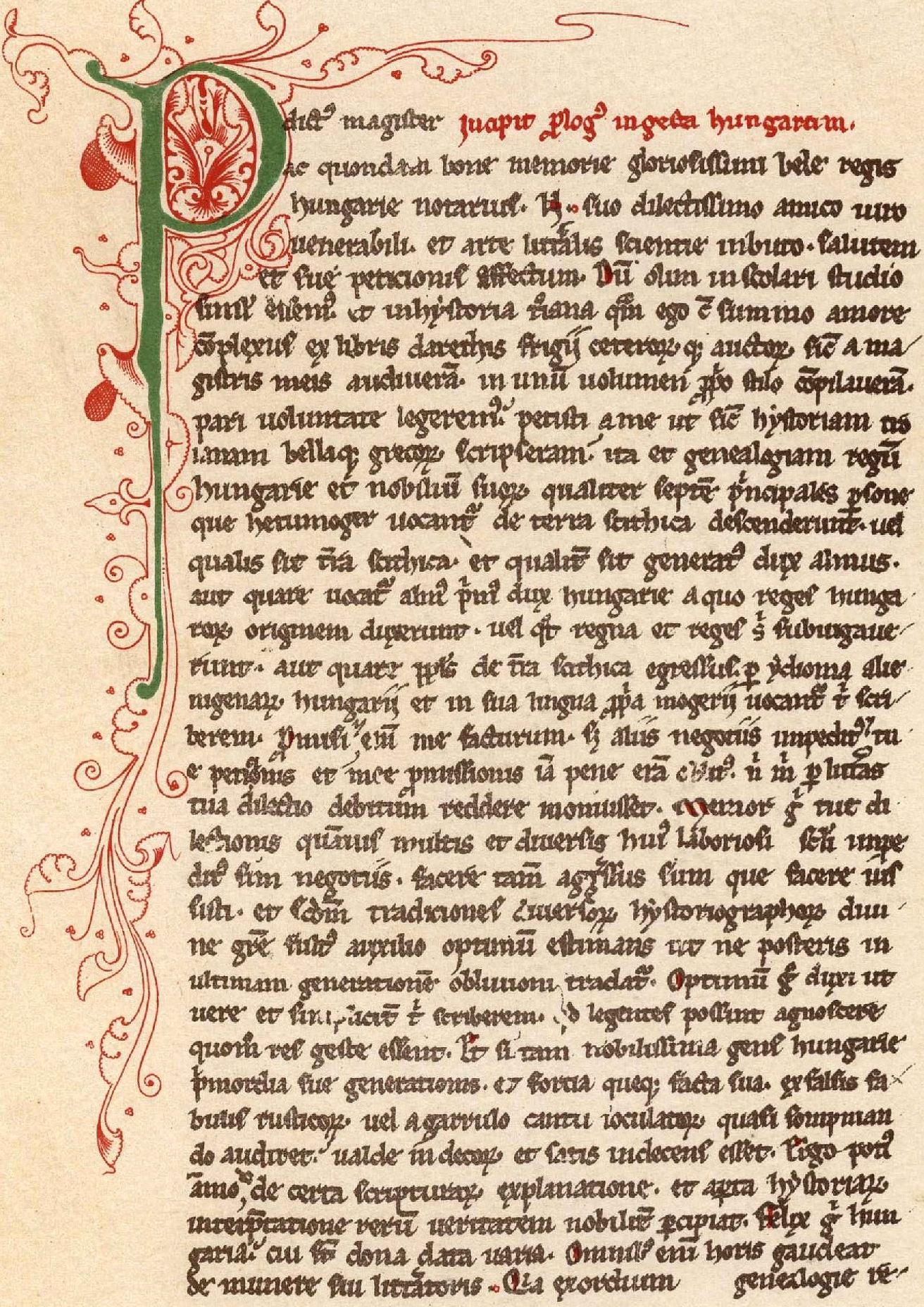
First page of the Gesta Hungarorum

Both Anonymus and the Hungarian chronicle are well aware of Roman law, the frequent use of ius and its derivatives proves it, in addition to the terms culpa, sceleratus or legittimus. The chronicler utilized the wording of contemporary diploma formulas. The author of the Hungarian chronicle also knew the history of the Trojan War and used as an inspiration, when narrated the Siege of Belgrade took place in 1071. Both Anonymus and the Urgesta frequently use the term "magister" referring to scholars in Western universities. This also strengthens the chronicler's education in France. From the second half of the 12th century, chronicles often described a person's appearance from top to bottom. The author of the Urgesta applies the same method in connection with Béla I and Coloman. Both Anonymus and the chronicle use the method of "oratio recta" ("straight speech"), when quote historical persons in their narratives. Both works are characterized by the detailing of war events. They use phrases that can be paralleled with each other (e.g. totus exercitus). Rarely used words also occur in the two texts (for instance, astur). The word consiliarius appears in the chronicle too; beside that only a non-authentic charter uses this term from 1209. This also strengthens Kristó's theory about a large-scale redaction in the early 13th century. Kornél Szovák numbered 20 unique phrases that only occur in the chronicle text (two of them are only typos). Szovák found only four such terms in the Gesta Hungarorum.

Kristó considered the chronicle can be described as a work with a unified wording, which was compiled sometime between 1210 and 1235. The chronicler was a contemporary of Anonymus, they both attended a foreign university, possibly in France. Due to individual stylistic features, the identity of the chronicler with Anonymus can be ruled out. Unlike other academics, Kristó considered that a single author created the existing part of the text narrating the history of the 11–12th centuries.

=== Linguistic analysis ===
Bernadett Benei comprehensively analyzed the 11–12th century section of the Latin text of the Hungarian chronicle (i.e. from the Urgesta until the hypothetical early 13th-century redaction) in her 2022 academic thesis.

==== Analysis and conclusions ====
Based on the examination of the text's morphology, Benei emphasized that the text shows classical Middle Latin features, where the distinctions between pronouns are often blurred. Demonstrative pronouns and possessive pronouns are often confused. Some prepositions have a different connotation compared to classical Latin, or undergo a change in meaning. There is also a sign of Hebraism in the accusative structure of some prepositions. When addressing monarchs and other high-ranking persons, superlative adjective conjugation often appears. The conjugation shows classic medieval Latin style features. According to Benei, several phenomena prove the linguistic unity of the text, but there are also signs of fragmentation of the text.

Bernadett Benei analyzed participle structures too. Based on this, she found out that the unidentified chronicler generally followed the grammatical rules of classical Latin, but there are also medieval Latin features. For instance, the author used subordinate clause introduced by a conjunction instead of accusativus cum infinitivo in 76 cases, while applied participle structures in 99 instances. They are evenly distributed, except for 122–126th chapters, which narrate the Battle of Mogyoród and St. Ladislaus' vision, where only the grammar of medieval Latin appears in this context. Therefore, Benei argued this section perhaps was written shortly after the canonization of St. Ladislaus (1192). The examination of ablativus absolutus also marked this section (120–128th chapters) as a text with a markedly medieval Latin language. This can strengthen Gyula Kristó and Kornél Szovák's single-author redaction theory regarding the activity of Ladislaus I. The spread of gerundive structures can be observed in the context of the text as a whole, similar to contemporary hagiographies and historical texts in Hungary. This and other grammatical phenomena strengthen the unity of the text. Nominativus cum infinitivo, however, is distributed disproportionately in the text, which rather shows the fragmentation, but this could even be a remnant of an earlier, later completely overwritten editing.

The chronicler exhibits all tense structures in his work. He used most frequently praesēns perfectum (1293 instances) as a main clause predicate, while the usage of praeteritum perfectum is only occasional. The structure coepisse+infinitivus (20 cases) reflects medieval Latin linguistic phenomenon. There is also the usage of coniunctivus in various places of the text. Regarding coordinate structures, conjunctive coordination (et) appears most frequently. The conjunctions et and que have opposite meanings in places close to each other, which rather supports the non-uniformity of the text, but the latter usually leads into clause is various parts of the corpus, which can prove uniformity. Regarding adversative coordinations, often lose their emphasis and can be corresponded to the meaning "in turn". The conjunction autem ("namely") appears exclusively only that section, which narrates the story of Solomon and his cousins. Regarding subordinate structures, in several cases there are deviations from the rules of classical Latin grammar (among the 73 subject and object adverbial clauses, 19 percent deviates, while among the 50 adverbial construction of purposes, 40 percent do not follow classical Latin grammar). There also consequent adverbial clauses (21, eight of them shows medieval Latin phenomenon), causative clauses (89), tense clauses, comparable clauses (84) and applicable clauses (226, overwhelmingly qui).

János Horváth, Jr. divided the chronicle text into three parts by style and rhythm (see above). Bernadett Benei argued that there are stylistic elements that connect these parts, primarily the usage of such figures of speech (rhetoric) like anaphora, epistrophe, pleonasm, synezeugmenon and antonomasia. The "crown" as the main allegory for the Kingdom of Hungary can be found throughout the text. The chronicler often used the device of metonymy and alliteration. Most of the stylistic devices prove the unity of the text, according to Benei. She also compared the text with the Gesta Hungarorum. She believed that there is a 65–70% match between the two texts grammatically and stylistically. She added the chronicler's knowledge of Latin seems more sophisticated than that of Anonymus. As a conclusion, Benei discovered two linguistic layers in the text of the chronicle: the earlier text had more in mind the linguistic rules of classical Latin, while the second one, with Middle Latin characteristics, was created during a large-scale redaction. The second style prevails most strongly in the 121–128th chapters: this is where the original text has been re-edited and rewritten to the greatest extent. Benei estimated that the proportion of classical Latin and medieval Latin in the entire text is roughly 60–40%. According to Benei, it was possible to grammatically prove Gyula Kristó's thesis regarding the large-scale redaction, which plausibly occurred in the first decades of the 13th century. Benei claimed in the text of the chronicle there are some faint hints that the chronicler may have belonged to the Cistercians.

==== Historical layers ====
===== Roman law =====
Phrase	Location	Note
iudices [...] pedanes	Ch. 71.	In Ancient Rome, iudex pedaneus acted as a judge in the absence of the governor. In the text, Peter Orseolo, when threatened the magnates of Hungary who were dissatisfied, with fill all offices with Germans, he included the word pedaneos (local judge or billogos). The chronicler was well aware of Corpus Juris Civilis and Codex Theodosianus. Later, Simon of Kéza extracted this part into his own work. The term iudex pedaneus first appears in a 1298 charter.
angaria	Ch. 71.	Meaning "servitude". Accordingly, Peter said that "Hoc nomen Hungaria derivatum est ab angaria", i.e. "This name Hungary comes from servitude". László Veszprémy argued the word play is based on the Greek word angaria that survived in the language of the Roman law, meaning "service, pay, tax burden." It has, in fact, nothing to do with the name of Hungary.
sine iudicii examine	Ch. 75.	The chronicle text tell that Samuel Aba executed the alleged conspirators "without examination or trial". This phrase also appears in the legenda maior of Saint Stephen. This section of the chronicle text was extracted by Simon of Kéza in the 1280s.
predones et latrunculi	Ch. 76.	The text describes those Hungarians who had fled to the Holy Roman Empire as "robbers and brigands". This phrase also appears in this form in the 49th Book of Digesta (an institutio written by Ulpian). Roman law make a disntinction between hostes (enemies, e.g. Parni) from latrunculi (brigands), thus they are subject to a different legal assessment. The latter word also appears in the 90th and 134th chapters of the chronicle.
felix embola	Ch. 103.	The phrase appears in that chapter, which narrates the victory of Solomon and his cousins against the Cumans. It also can be found in the Gesta Hungarorum. The embola is a medieval Latin word of Greek origin, its meaning is uncertain. It is included in the Codex Iustinianus with the meaning "ship's baggage". In the Hungarian Latin-language texts it has a meaning "army" or "an attacking military unit". Regarding felix embola, László Veszprémy argued Anonymus met this word connection in the work of Alexander Neckam during his stay in Paris, or it already appeared in the late 12th-century chronicle text.
affectuosissimis et instanttissimis precibus compulerunt	Ch. 131.	The text says that when Ladislaus I was crowned king because "they [the nobles of Hungary] compelled him thereto by their most loving and insistent prayers". József Gerics and László Veszprémy said that this sentence was influenced directly by a letter of Pope Gregory VII in 1081, indirectly by the theory of the "reluctant king", located in Pastoral Care by Pope Gregory I and the Codex Iustinianus.
mediam capitis diminutionem	Ch. 157.	Duke Álmos "was forced into exile" by Stephen II, the text narrates. It is an expression of Roman law: "deminutio capitis" means a change of status of a person, a "middle civil penalty", which resulted a banishment and loss of citizenship in Ancient Rome. The phrase appears in Institutes.

===== Canon law =====
Phrase	Location	Note
fecit eos obtruncari nec contritos nec confessos	Ch. 75.	Samuel Aba ordered to massacre his opponents "without repentance or confession". In 428, Pope Celestine I wrote in his letter to the bishops of Gaul that this type of death resulted everlasting damnation. Since then, this phrase became part of several works of the canon law, including Rabanus Maurus, Ansbert or Burchard of Worms.
Et quantum iuste humanitatis arbitratu pensari potest, cum cordis contritione et satifactione de peccatis suis penituit	Ch. 136.	Describing Solomon's expiation, the fallen king "groaned at the memory of what he had done, and he repented his sins, so far as human understanding might judge, with a humble and contrite heart". It is a widely used phrase in canon law, e.g. various parts of the Decretum Gratiani.
Non transgrediaris terminos patrum ... Suis itaque terminis contentus esse maluit ... leges convenieni vigore sanctiendo ... eis rector et gubernator in exercitu lesu Christi existeret	Ch. 139.	The chapter narrates Saint Ladislaus' death and the reconstruction of the church of Várad (present-day Oradea, Romania). The Biblical and canonical description of the "unwilling, humble" monarch contains several elements of the canon law, including quotes from the Old Testament, the Decretum Gratiani, the letter of Pope Gregory VII to Ladislaus. According to László Veszprémy, the continuator at the turn of the 12–13th centuries consciously expanded the king's characterization with chivalrous virtues, supporting them with canon law quotations from Gratian's collection.
Erat namque habitu corporis contemtibilis, sed astutus et docilis, ispidus, pilosus, luscus, gibosus, claudus et blesus	Ch. 143.	The phrases of the unfavorable characterization of Coloman (he "was of mean stature, but astute and a fast learner; he was shaggy and hirsute, half-blind and humpbacked, lame and a stammerer") are inspired from works of the canon law. These characteristics appear in the Historia Augusta, the Bible (Book of Leviticus), the commentaries of Isidore of Seville and Jerome, and the Decretum Gratiani. The chronicler plausibly utilized a treatise on canon law that listed the physical obstacles to ordination as a priest. Coloman's characterization can be compared with of Thersites in Iliad. Its Latin version, the Ilias Latina was spread in Europe by the Cistercians, which may perhaps reflect the chronicler's affiliation to the order.
sed lex ab ea eum separavit, quam reatus acusavit, culpa dampnavit, maleficium coartavit	Ch. 149.	Euphemia of Kiev, Coloman's second wife, "was taken in the sin of adultery", therefore the king soon disowned her, sending her back to the Rus'. The chronicler borrowed the legal phrases from the Decretum Gratiani. With this, the chronicler emphasized that Boris' claim to the throne was without a legal basis.
et infectum est altare sanguine	Ch. 151.	The dying Coloman ordered to imprison his blinded brother Álmos. He sent one of his nobles, Benedict, son of Both to capture the duke, who was sheltered in the church of Dömös. Benedict laid sacrilegious hands upon him and pulled at him violently as he clung to the altar. While he thus strove to drag him away, the skin on the duke's hands was torn and the "altar was defiled with blood". This was a serious violation of the canon law, which declared churches as asylums. Beside that, the codices of Stephen I, Ladislaus I and Coloman also designated the churches as places of refuge.
Non est bonum reddere malum pro bono	Ch. 166.	Géza II permitted Louis VII of France and his crusaders to pass through the country. When the king learnt that the pretender Boris was with the French, he sent a letter to Louis VII, saying "it is not good to return evil for good ...". The quote is from the Decretum Gratiani, which is based on biblical (Jewish) proverb.
ut adulterinam progeniem ecclesia non communicat	Ch. 166.	The Hungarian envoys disputed Boris' right to asylum, saying that "according to the teaching of our doctors, adulterous offspring has no place in the church". József Gerics argued the chronicler recalled the ban on ordination to the priesthood due to illegitimate descent, which can be found in the Old Testament, the Decretum Gratiani and the Decretals of Gregory IX (or Liber Extra).

===== Age-marking terms =====
Phrase	Location	Note
marcis auri purissimi	Ch. 66.	The phrase appears in that text, which narrates the campaign of Stephen I against Kean, Duke of Bulgarians and Slavs in 1003 (or 1010s). This unit of measure is equivalent to 240 grams of weight; it is first appears in contemporary charter in the last will of hospes Fulco (1146). Gyula Kristó argued this text, consequently, is a result of an early 13th-century interpolation. It is also appears frequently in the Gesta Hungarorum.
furor Teutonicus	Ch. 71, 81, 93, 165 (twice).	Meaning "German fury", this topos appears five times in the text of the chronicle, in the context of various defensive wars against the Holy Roman Empire. The phrase originates from Pharsalia by Lucan (1st century). In the Middle Ages, it was first used by Ekkehard of Aura in his Chronicon universale at the turn of the 11–12th centuries. Bernát L. Kumorovitz and Elemér Mályusz considered this phrase was recorded by a contemporary chronicler regarding the 11th-century text, citing that Lucan's work was part of the library of the Pannonhalma Abbey during the reign of St. Ladislaus. Gyula Kristó emphasized that xenophobia became more significant in Hungary at the beginning of the 13th century (e.g. Gesta Hungarorum, Golden Bull, Oath of Bereg), so the term can also be domesticated during that time. László Veszprémy argued the phrase became more widespread in Europe in the mid-12th century, during the Italian campaigns of Frederick Barbarossa.
magnates Hungariae	various	The phrase appears in various parts of the chronicle text, chronologically first from the period of the reign of Peter Orseolo. The phrase, indicating the Hungarian nobility or elite, first appears frequently during the reign of Stephen III, replacing other words (e.g. optimates or proceres). Following that, the phrase disappeared for decades and it was re-introduced only in the 13th century.
falangos aulicorum	various	Correctly falanges aulicorum ("courtly retinue"), the chronicler borrowed the phrase from the Annales Altahenses. It appears in descriptions of various military campaigns (Samuel Aba, Stephen II, Béla II). There is an argument that the continuator under Stephen III used this term retroactively during re-editing.
accintus est gladio	Ch. 64, 66, 116, 165.	The symbol of "girding with a sword" appears in various parts of the Bible. Stephen I "was for the first time girded with his sword", when he was preparing for war against Koppány. Among the privileges of the chapter of Székesfehérvár, Pope Benedict VIII granted two scapularies the hems with the privilege of such authority that whoever should wear these for the celebration of Mass should be rightfully empowered to anoint and crown the king and to gird him with a sword. During the conflict between Solomon and Géza, abbot William "immediately [...] girt on a sword and mounting his horse". Shortly before the Battle of the Fischa, Géza II was also girded with a sword in token of his coming of age. Regarding Stephen I, historian Zoltán Tóth did not consider the chronicle's report to be credible, because at that time the royal spear was still considered the main symbol of royal power in the Holy Roman Empire (until the reign of Henry IV). László Veszprémy also considered this section in non-authentic, since ecclesiastical involvement does not appear during the act, and Stephen was already well past childhood. Regarding the chapter of Székesfehérvár, the provost never enjoyed these privileges. The sword appears among the royal insignia during only the reign of Coloman. Otto of Freising also mentions Géza's girding with a sword, which already reflects the chivalric ideal of the mid-12th century. It is possible that the chronicler at the turn of 12–13th centuries, who redacted the text, also made this act part of the ceremonies in connection with previous royal inaugurations, in an anachronistic way.
pulpa	Ch. 82.	As a non-Christian habit, Vata and his followers ate the "flesh of horses". This phrase also appears in the longer legend of St. Gerard. Sándor Domanovszky argued the chronicle utilized the legend's text, while János Horváth, Jr. thought exactly the opposite, the legend's author changed several phrases, thus breaking the rhymes of its rhyming prose. József Gerics agreed with Horváth, arguing that the hagiographer sought for more common words instead of less frequently used terms. This part in the chronicle text was definitely written before the early 13th century.
collecta/exactio	Ch. 72, 82, 94.	Vata and his pagan rebels sent three envoys to the camp of King Peter to proclaim the order of Andrew and Levente, which contains, among others, the "tribute collected utterly done away with". The word collecta, a kind of extraordinary tax, first appears in contemporary records in 1198, and became a frequent tax since the reign of Andrew II. This word was inserted into the pre-existing text during the large-scale redaction in the 13th century. Its synonym, the phrase exactio appears twice in the chronicle text: accordingly, Samuel Aba revoked the exactions which Peter Orseolo had established according to his custom, while this tax is also mentioned regarding the rule of Béla I. In Western Europe, exactio meant irregular and arbitrary kind of taxation. The phrase first appears in Hungary in 1225. Its usage regarding the 11th century is also a sign of anachronistic interpolation from the early 13th century.
praeco	Ch. 82, 92, 95, 155.	This phrase marks an official with different functions throughout the text: messenger, doorkeeper and summoner of conscripts. Originally meaning hayward (Hungarian: csősz), the praeco was a member of the royal household. The office is mentioned throughout the Árpád era.
clericum suum litteratum	Ch. 117.	The phrase marked those ecclesiastics who knew Latin. It reflects the ecclesiastical conditions in the late 11th or early 12th century.
astur/austur	Ch. 148.	Duke Álmos, residing in Csór, "captured a crow by sending after it a buzzard". The word astur ("buzzard") appears in Emese's dream, narrated by Anonymus' Gesta Hungarorum. György Györffy analyzed that this re-Latinized Romance word is of Italian and Occitan ("ostur") origin, which first appears in this form in an Italian charter in 1249. Györffy argued that Anonymus, returning Hungary, nativeized this word in Hungary, i.e. this text could not be written before the early 13th century. In contrast, József Gerics listed examples of the word from 9–12th centuries in Western Europe.

===== Classical antiquity =====
Chapter	Phrase/Description	Classical analogy
89	effeminati enervatique	Consolatio ad se by Cicero
102–103	camps on the mountaintop	De re militari by Vegetius, writings of Julius Caesar, Historiae Alexandri by Curtius Rufus
107	Siege of Belgrade (1071)	Trojan War
121	Battle of Mogyoród	dextrarius ("war horse", Pharsalia by Lucan); praestolor (e.g. Ammianus Marcellinus, Sidonius Apollinaris); arduus equus ("hard horse", Georgica by Virgil); pocula dire mortis eisdem propinarunt ("they [Géza's army] poured out to them [Solomon's army] the cups of dire death", proverb originally referring to the forced suicide of Socrates by poisoning, also used by e.g. Lucan, Cicero, Historia Langobardorum by Paul the Deacon, writings of Augustine of Hippo, hagiography of Cuthbert by Bede, Annales Quedlinburgenses)
122	Battle of Mogyoród	Gesta Ladislai regis; various motives from the works of Herodotos (Solomon = Cyrus, Darius, Xerxes; "intriguer" Count Vid = Democedes, Atossa, Mardonius; "peace-loving" Count Ernyei = Croesus, Artabanus, Demaratus); Ladislaus' vision before the battle, desecration of Vid's corpse (medieval literary analogies through Justin and Petrus Comestor)
123	Solomon and his mother after the battle	The queen mother foretells the downfall of his son (Persai by Aeschylus, Ab urbe condita by Livy, Gesta Francorum)
137	gloomy and tearful king	Stephen I as "reverential and gloomy" king (oratio lacrimarum; Rudens by Plautus, Metamorphoses by Ovid, Argonautica by Valerius Flaccus, Eirene by Aristophanes, Confessiones by Augustine of Hippo, in addition to medieval narrative and liturgical works)
148	Béla's blinding	The child Béla [II] should be castrated too but the soldier who was charged with this task refused to execute the order, and, instead, he castrated a dog and brought its testicles to Coloman. Analogies can be found in Oedipus by Sophocles, the early life of Cyrus by Herodotos, the biography of Romulus by Plutarch, Excidium Troiae (through Konrad von Würzburg's poem), Tristan by Gottfried von Strassburg.

===== Biblical phrases and parallels =====
Beside the style element of Hebraisms (e.g. accintus est gladio or in saecula saeculorum), the 11–12th-century chronicle text contains 29 full quotations (one of them was also a part of the Ecgbert coronation ordo) and 57 paraphrases from the Bible. Furthermore, there are also biblical phrases and lines serving as the background of the simile.

Some narratives was written using well-known biblical stories. According to Péter B. Kovács, the Siege of Belgrade in 1071 (105th chapter) is depicted as similar to the story David and Goliath in its motif set and lexicography. László Veszprémy found biblical parallels with the story of Saint Stephen girding with a sword. Dániel Bagi emphasized the nature of the trial by ordeal of Duke Béla's duel with a Pomeranian warrior.

== See also ==
- List of Hungarian chronicles
- Gesta Hungarorum
- Gesta Hunnorum et Hungarorum
- Chronicon Pictum
- Buda Chronicle
- Chronica Hungarorum
- Epitome rerum Hungarorum
- Nádasdy Mausoleum

== Sources ==
- B. Kovács, Péter (2020). "A Gesta Ladislai regis néhány bibliai eredetű hasonlatáról [Biblical Metaphors in the Gesta Ladislai regis]". Századok (in Hungarian). 154 (5). Magyar Történelmi Társulat: 1083–1104. ISSN 0039-8098.
- Benei, Bernadett (2022). A magyar krónika Árpád-kori szakaszának latin nyelve [The Latin Language of the Hungarian Chronicle's 11–12th Century Parts] (in Hungarian). ELKH Bölcsészettudományi Kutatóközpont. ISBN 978-963-416-343-5.
- Csákó, Judit (2015). "Volt-e krónikása II. Andrásnak? Megjegyzések gestaszerkesztményünk 13. század eleji átdolgozásának problematikájához [Did Andrew II have a Chronicler? Remarks on the Problem of the Reworking of the Old Hungarian Gesta in the Early 13th Century]". Századok (in Hungarian). 149 (2). Magyar Történelmi Társulat: 301–332. ISSN 0039-8098.
- Gerics, József (1961). Legkorábbi gesta-szerkesztéseinek keletkezésrendjének problémái [Problems of the Date of Compilation of the Earliest Gesta Editions] (in Hungarian). Budapest: Értekezések a történeti tudományok köréből. Új sorozat (22), Hungarian Academy of Sciences.
- Grzesik, Ryszard (2010). "Gesta Ungarorum deperdita". In Dunphy, Graeme (ed.). Encyclopedia of the Medieval Chronicle. Leiden: Brill. pp. 701–702. ISBN 90-04-18464-3.
- Györffy, György (1993). "Az Árpád-kori magyar krónikák [Hungarian Chronicles of the Árpádian Age]". Századok (in Hungarian). 127 (3–4). Magyar Történelmi Társulat: 391–412. ISSN 0039-8098.
- Hazai, György (1996). Nagy Szülejmán udvari emberének magyar krónikája (A Tarih-i Ungurus és kritikája) [The Hungarian Chronicle of Suleiman the Magnificent's Court Historian: The Tarih-i Üngürüs and its Critics] (in Hungarian). Akadémiai Kiadó. ISBN 963-057-407-1.
- Hóman, Bálint (1925). A Szent László-kori Gesta Ungarorum és a XII–XIII. századi leszármazói: Forrástanulmány [The Gesta Ungarorum of Saint Ladislaus and its 12–13th-Century Derivatives] (PDF) (in Hungarian). Budapest: Hungarian Academy of Sciences.
- Horváth, Jr., János (1954). Árpád-kori latinnyelvű irodalmunk stílusproblémái [Stylistic Problems of the Árpád-Era Latin Literature] (in Hungarian). Budapest: Hungarian Academy of Sciences.
- Kristó, Gyula (1994). "Krónikakompozíció [Chronicle Composition]". In Kristó, Gyula; Engel, Pál; Makk, Ferenc (eds.). Korai magyar történeti lexikon (9-14. század) [=Encyclopedia of the Early Hungarian History (9th-14th centuries)] (in Hungarian). Akadémiai Kiadó. pp. 381–382. ISBN 963-05-6722-9.
- Kristó, Gyula (2002). Magyar historiográfia I. Történetírás a középkori Magyarországon [Hungarian Historiography I. History Writing in Medieval Hungary] (in Hungarian). Osiris. ISBN 978-963-389-261-9.
- Macartney, C. A. (1953). The Medieval Hungarian Historians: A Critical & Analytical Guide. Cambridge University Press. ISBN 978-0-521-08051-4.
- Mályusz, Elemér (1967). A Thuróczy-krónika és forrásai [The Thuróczy Chronicle and its Sources] (in Hungarian). Budapest: Tudománytörténeti tanulmányok 5, Hungarian Academy of Sciences.
- Sudár, Balázs (2012). "Az oszmánok és Magyarország mentális meghódítása [The Ottomans and the mental occupation of Hungary]". In Ács, Pál; Székely, Júlia (eds.). Identitás és kultúra a török hódoltság korában. Budapest: Balassi Kiadó. pp. 40–49. ISBN 978-86-7743-139-6.
- Szőcs, Tibor (2007). "A 14. századi krónikaszerkesztmény interpolációi és 11. századi okleveleink [Interpolations of the 14th-Century Chronicle Compilation and the 11th-Century Charters]". Fons. 14 (1). Szentpétery Imre Történettudományi Alapítvány: 59–96. ISSN 1217-8020.
- Thoroczkay, Gábor (2016). Ismeretlen Árpád-kor: Püspökök, legendák, króniák [The Unknown Age of the Árpáds: Bishops, Legends and Chronicles] (in Hungarian). L'Harmattan. ISBN 978-963-414-212-6.
- Veszprémy, László (2019). Történetírás és történetírók az Árpád-kori Magyarországon (XI–XIII. század közepe) [History Writing and Historians in Hungary during the Reign of the Árpád Dynasty (Eleventh–Mid Thirteenth Century] (in Hungarian). Line Design. ISBN 978-963-480-004-0.
