= Nicholas (bishop of Győr) =

Hungarian clergyman

- Bishop of Győr
- Installed: before 1051
- Term ended: 1055 (?)
- Predecessor: first known
- Successor: Hartvik (?)

Personal details
- Died: 1055 or later
- Denomination: Roman Catholic

Nicholas (Hungarian: Miklós; died around 1055) was an 11th-century Hungarian prelate, who served as the first known bishop of Győr under King Andrew I of Hungary. It is possible that the establishing charter of the abbey of Tihany, a document which contains the oldest written words in Hungarian, was composed by Bishop Nicholas. There is also a scholarly theory that Nicholas compiled the Urgesta, the earliest Hungarian chronicle.

== Sources ==
=== Primary sources ===
- Bak, János M.; Veszprémy, László; Kersken, Norbert (2018). Chronica de gestis Hungarorum e codice picto saec. XIV [The Illuminated Chronicle: Chronicle of the deeds of the Hungarians from the fourteenth-century illuminated codex]. Budapest: Central European University Press. ISBN 978-9-6338-6264-3.

=== Secondary studies ===
- Bánk, József, ed. (1968). Győregyházmegyei almanach. Schematizmus Dioecesis Jaurinensis [Almanac of the Diocese of Győr] (in Hungarian). Authority of the Diocese of Győr.
- Benei, Bernadett (2022). A magyar krónika Árpád-kori szakaszának latin nyelve [The Latin Language of the Hungarian Chronicle's 11–12th Century Parts] (in Hungarian). ELKH Bölcsészettudományi Kutatóközpont. ISBN 978-963-416-343-5.
- Horváth, János Jr. (1954). Árpád-kori latinnyelvű irodalmunk stílusproblémái [Stylistic Problems of the Latin-language Literature of the Árpád Period] (in Hungarian). Akadémiai Kiadó.
- Horváth, János Jr. (1955). "Miklós püspök és a tihanyi alapítólevél [Bishop Nicholas and the Establishing Charter of Tihany]". Magyar Nyelv (in Hungarian). 51 (2). Magyar Nyelvtudományi Társaság: 146–156. ISSN 0025-0228.
- Komjáthy, Miklós (1955). "A tihanyi alapítólevél problémái [Problematic Questions on the Establishing Charter of Tihany]". Levéltári Közlemények (in Hungarian). 26 (1). National Archives of Hungary: 27–47. ISSN 0024-1512.
- Pais, Dezső (1955). "Miklós püspök írta-e a tihanyi alapítólevelet? [Did Bishop Nicholas write the Establishing Charter of Tihany?]". Magyar Nyelv (in Hungarian). 51 (1). Magyar Nyelvtudományi Társaság: 10–17. ISSN 0025-0228.
- Tóth, Péter (2007). "Vallon főpapok a magyar egyház újjászervezésében a pogánylázadás után" [Walloon Prelates in the Reorganization of the Hungarian Church after the Pagan Rebellion]. In Érszegi, Géza (ed.). Tanulmányok a 950 éves Tihanyi alapítólevél tiszteletére [Studies in Honor of the 950-year-old Founding Charter of Tihany] (in Hungarian). Tihany: Benedictine Abbey of Tihany. pp. 31–36. ISBN 9789638700445.
- Zsoldos, Attila (2011). Magyarország világi archontológiája, 1000–1301 [Secular Archontology of Hungary, 1000–1301] (in Hungarian). História, MTA Történettudományi Intézete. ISBN 978-963-9627-38-3.

Catholic Church titles
Preceded by first known	Bishop of Győr fl. 1051–1055	Succeeded by Hartvik (?)
