= Hartvik =

Hungarian clergyman

Hartvik (Arduin)
- Bishop of Győr
- Installed: before 1097
- Term ended: after 1103
- Predecessor: Nicholas (?)
- Successor: George

Personal details
- Died: after 1103
- Denomination: Roman Catholic

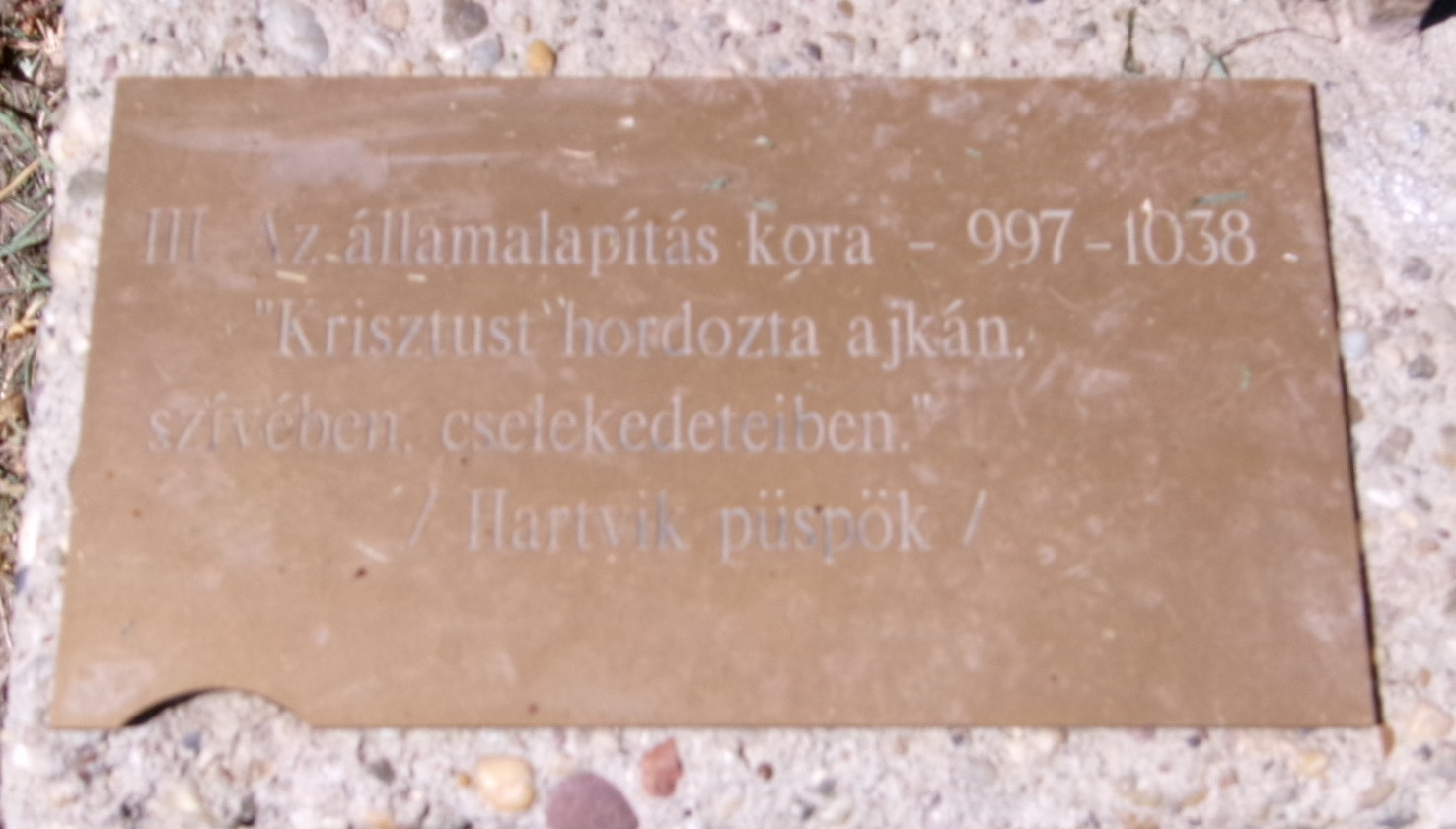
Plaque on the Szarvas Historical Memorial Trail, inscription reading: III. - 997-1038 / Age of State Founding /... quotation of bishop Hartvik

Hartvik or Hartvic (also Arduin, German: Hartwig; died after 1103) was a prelate (most probably the bishop of Győr) in the Kingdom of Hungary under King Coloman the Book-lover. He wrote a new Life of St Stephen I of Hungary based on the holy king's two earlier hagiographies.

== Identification ==
The author of the Legenda Hartviciana called himself Cartuicus or Hartuicus episcopus, without mentioning his episcopal see. Several historians in the 19th century claimed Hartvik (or Hartvic) was of German origin, and perhaps served as bishop of Regensburg (and thus he is identical with Hartwig I of Spanheim) or Meissen (see Herwig of Meissen). Other historians considered he is identical with that Hartwig, who was abbot of Hersfeld from 1072 to 1090, and was installed as pro-imperial anti-Archbishop of Magdeburg in 1085. According to this theory, Hartvik was deprived of his position by Pope Urban II in 1088 and fled Hungary thereafter. It is possible that King Ladislaus I was that monarch, who appointed him Bishop of Győr.

Based on the fact that Arduin of Ivrea, an 11th-century claimant to the title King of Italy, was referred to as Hartvigus in contemporary German sources, historian Gyula Pauler considered that Hartvik is identical with that episcopus Ioviensis Arduin, who – alongside a certain comes Thomas – was sent by King Coloman of Hungary to the court of Roger I of Sicily in 1097 to propose marriage to Roger's daughter. Their legation is appeared in De rebus gestis Rogerii et Roberti by Benedictine historian Goffredo Malaterra. Pauler argued the episcopal see Ioviensis is a result of distortion of text and can be matched with Iaurinensis, i.e. the Diocese of Győr.

His theological proficiency is shown by the fact that he used the 9th-century Pseudo-Isidore decretals in his work. A late 11th-century pontifical liturgical book (Agenda Pontificalis), kept in Zagreb, was compiled for a certain bishop Chartuirgus. Church historian Károly Kniewald identified this person with Hartvik, the bishop of Győr, based on the listed churches and procession routes. The pontifical was compiled before 1100. A now lost royal charter of Coloman issued in 1103, recorded by 18th-century historian Miklós Schmitth, mentioned Bishop Arduin of Győr among the witnesses. Hartvik was described as an "excellently skilled and educated scholar in the moral and scriptural sciences" by a contemporary friar. His successor, George is first mentioned as bishop in 1111, implying that Hartvik died by then.

== Legenda Hartviciana ==
Upon the order of Coloman, Hartvik composed the hagiography of Saint Stephen, the first king of Hungary – called Legenda Hartviciana or Vita Hartviciana, which was based on two existing legends (Legenda maior and Legenda minor). Historian Gábor Thoroczkay argued Hartvik compiled his work in the period between 1097 and 1099, or the early 1100s at the latest, while other historians – e.g. Zoltán Tóth, József Gerics – considered the bishop wrote the legend in the 1110s. Beside the veneration of Stephen I, Hartvik's legend served justified the political purposes of Coloman in order to defend his royal prerogative to appoint the prelates of his realm, as a response to the Gregorian Reform and the Investiture Controversy. Hartvik also laid the foundations of the Holy Crown doctrine and the idea of Apostolic Majesty in his work. With some modifications in the text, Pope Innocent III sanctioned the Legenda Hartviciana as the official hagiography of Stephen I of Hungary in 1201.

== Sources ==
- Bánk, József, ed. (1968). Győregyházmegyei almanach. Schematizmus Dioecesis Jaurinensis [Almanac of the Diocese of Győr] (in Hungarian). Authority of the Diocese of Győr.
- Gerics, József (1993). "Hartvik". In Kristó, Gyula; Engel, Pál; Makk, Ferenc (eds.). Korai magyar történeti lexikon (9-14. század) [=Encyclopedia of the Early Hungarian History (9-14th centuries)]. Akadémiai Kiadó. p. 255. ISBN 963-05-6722-9.
- Pauler, Gyula (1883). "Ki volt Hartvic püspök? [Who was Bishop Hartvic?]". Századok (in Hungarian). 17 (9). Magyar Történelmi Társulat: 803–804. ISSN 0039-8098.
- Thoroczkay, Gábor (2009). "Megjegyzések a Hartvik-féle Szent István-legenda datálásának kérdéséhez [Comments to the Question of the Date of Hartvic's Life of King Stephen of Hungary]". In Thoroczkay, Gábor (ed.). Írások az Árpád-korról. Történeti és historiográfiai tanulmányok [Papers on Árpád Age. Historical and Historiographical Studies] (in Hungarian). L'Harmattan Kiadó. pp. 67–87. ISBN 978-963-236-165-9.
- Zsoldos, Attila (2011). Magyarország világi archontológiája, 1000–1301 [Secular Archontology of Hungary, 1000–1301] (in Hungarian). História, MTA Történettudományi Intézete. ISBN 978-963-9627-38-3.

Catholic Church titles
Preceded by Nicholas (?)	Bishop of Győr fl. 1097–1103	Succeeded by George
