= German–Hungarian War (1030–1031) =

Date	July–August 1030
Location	Little Hungarian Plain, Margraviate of Austria
Result	Hungarian victory
Territorial changes	The Holy Roman Empire fails to subjugate Hungary; Hungary is granted the lands between the rivers Leitha and Fischa

Belligerents
Holy Roman Empire; Duchy of Bavaria; Duchy of Bohemia (?)	Kingdom of Hungary

Commanders and leaders
Emperor Conrad II; Henry the Black; Bishop Meinwerk; Henry II, Count of Luxembourg; Adalbert, Margrave of Austria; Bretislav (?)	King Stephen I Emeric (?)

The German–Hungarian War took place between two neighboring realms, the Holy Roman Empire and the Kingdom of Hungary, in the summer of 1030, when emperor Conrad II launched a large-scale invasion to subjugate Hungary. The emperor, however, failed due to the scorched earth tactics used by the Hungarians. Their king Stephen I, in response, led a successful retaliatory campaign into Austrian territory. Peace was restored after Conrad had ceded the lands between the rivers Leitha and Fischa to Hungary in the summer of 1031. This war was the Holy Roman Empire's first attempt to annex Hungary's sovereignty, which endeavor accompanied the relationship between the two countries until the end of the 11th century.

== Background ==
=== German–Hungarian relations ===
Kingdom of Hungary in the 11th Century – German Wars

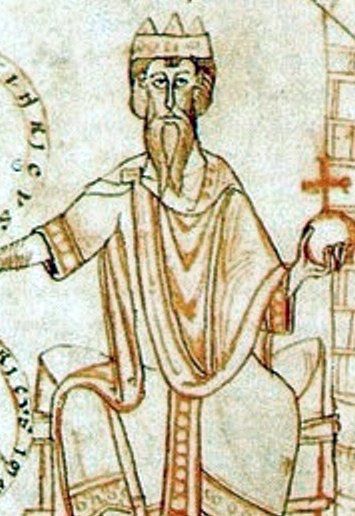
12th-century depiction of Conrad II, Holy Roman Emperor

With emperor Otto III's approval, Stephen I was crowned as the first Christian king of Hungary on Christmas Day, 1000. Otto III's successor, Henry II, was Stephen's brother-in-law by Stephen's marriage to Henry's sister Gisela, furthering the friendly relationship between the Holy Roman Empire and Hungary, which ensured that the western borders of Hungary experienced a period of peace in the first decades of the 11th century. Even when Henry II's discontented brother, Bruno, sought refuge in Hungary in 1004, Stephen preserved the peace with Germany and negotiated a settlement between his two brothers-in-law. Stephen's alliance with the Holy Roman Empire brought him into a war with Poland lasting from around 1015 until 1018. The German–Hungarian alliance did not mean political subjugation or vassal relationship for the new Christian kingdom. For instance, Stephen established at least one archbishopric, six bishoprics and three Benedictine monasteries, leading the Church in Hungary to develop independently from the ecclesiastical organization of the Holy Roman Empire. Henry did not question Hungary's independence, and Stephen did not intervene in German internal disputes, except when he mediated between the emperor and Bruno.

Emperor Henry II died on 13 July 1024. He was succeeded by a distant relative, Conrad II, the first emperor from the Salian dynasty. Under Conrad II, the German–Hungarian relations quickly turned hostile as Conrad pursued a more aggressive policy regarding eastern Europe. Perhaps Bishop Bruno of Augsburg, the brother of the deceased Henry, was a driving force behind this change. Conrad's "ostpolitische Konzeption", as German historiography refers to it, sought to conquer Bohemia, Poland and Hungary in order to establish and then maintain the Holy Roman Empire's hegemony in East-Central Europe. It was a sign of the emerging confrontation that Conrad II expelled the Venetian doge Otto Orseolo, the husband of Stephen's sister Grimelda from Venice in 1026. Conrad also persuaded the Bavarians to accept his own minor son, Henry, as their duke in 1027, although Stephen's son, Emeric of Hungary, had a legitimate claim to the Duchy of Bavaria through his mother. With Conrad's step, the frequent conflict between the German emperor and the Bavarian duke ceased, and Hungary became bordered by a hostile great power. Emperor Conrad planned a marriage alliance with the Byzantine Empire and dispatched one of his advisors, Bishop Werner of Strasbourg, to Constantinople. The bishop presented himself as a pilgrim, but Stephen, who had been informed of his actual purpose, which was completely contrary to Hungary's security policy interests, refused to let him enter the country in the autumn of 1027.

=== Reasons for Conrad's attack ===
==== Historical records ====
At this same time, dissensions arose between the Pannonian nation and the Bavarians, through the fault of the Bavarians. And, as a result, King [Stephen] of Hungary made many incursions and raids in the realm of the Norici (that is, of the Bavarians).

— Wipo, The Deeds of Conrad II

A contemporary author, Wipo of Burgundy, who was the court chaplain of Conrad II narrates the events in his biography of the emperor titled Gesta Chuonradi II imperatoris. Wipo wrote and presented his work to Conrad's son Henry III in 1046, shortly after the latter's coronation. Wipo narrates that the Bavarians incited skirmishes along the common borders of Hungary and the Holy Roman Empire in 1029, causing a rapid deterioration in relations between the two countries. The priest blamed the Bavarians for the conflict, which led Stephen's troops to continuously invade the duchy, primarily its frontier march, the Margraviate of Austria (Ostmark) for raids. During these campaigns, the Hungarians obtained numerous spoils. The emperor launched his war in retaliation for this. Although Wipo suppressed many facts, he insisted on objectivity, and the Hungarians appear in the role of victims or as the attacked party due to the provocations of the Bavarians. Wipo also shows sympathy for Stephen I, who he claims is protected by God.

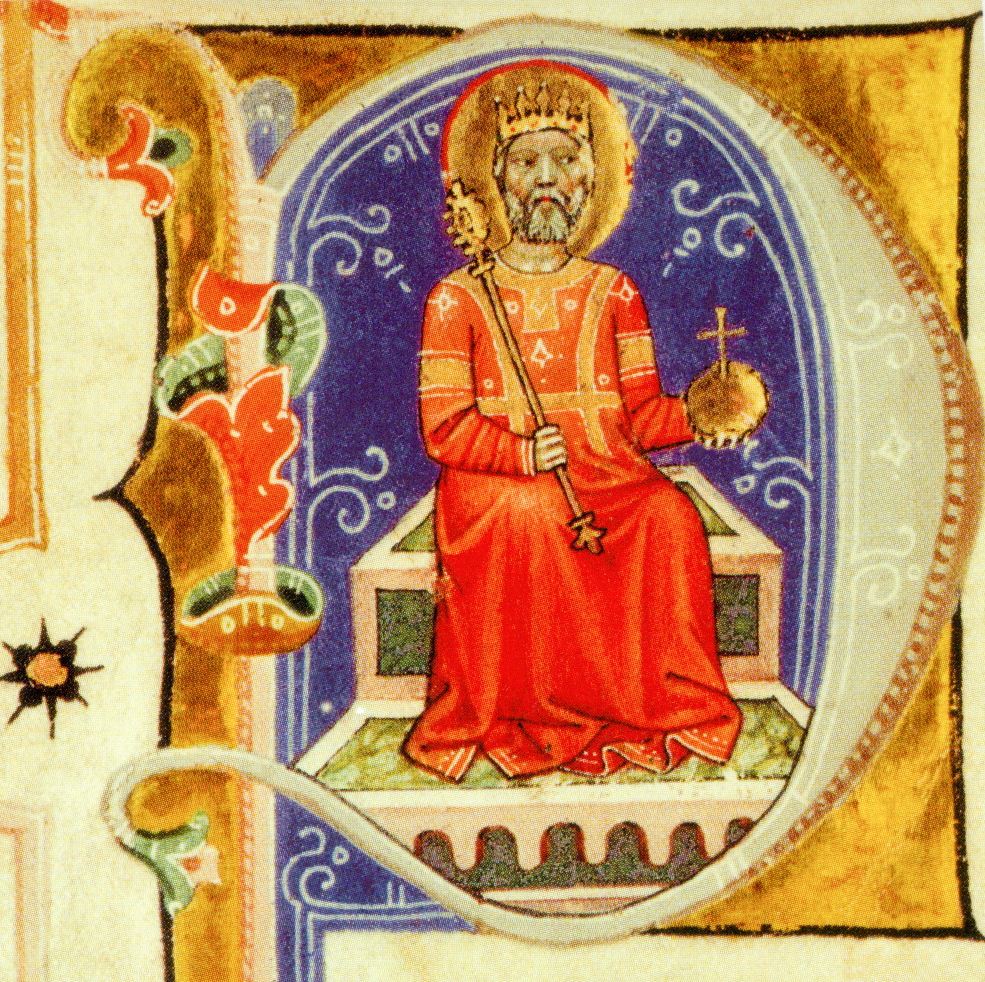
The elderly Stephen I of Hungary on the throne, depicted by the 14th-century Illuminated Chronicle

Wipo's contemporary Aloldus de Peklarn, the court chaplain of Adalbert, Margrave of Austria, who also participated in the war, writes that Conrad II and Stephen I took up arms against each other over the Bavarian succession issue. Aloldus' work was preserved by the 12th-century chronicler Ortilo de Lilienfeld, which itself became part of the compilation of 18th-century historian Chrysostomus Hanthaler. The Cistercian friar, however, added to or even falsified the texts on numerous occasions, so the authenticity of Aloldus is uncertain. Benedictine scholar Hermann of Reichenau writes that Emperor Conrad "had been at odds with the King of the Hungarians for a long time". Another 12th-century source, the Kaiserchronik claims that Stephen "did many evils against the empire", as a result of which, encouraged by the surrounding princes, Conrad launched his campaign.

The 15th-century Humanist scholar Georgius Merula claims that Conrad II attacked the Hungarians because they were inciting the Italian peoples to revolt and defect against the emperor by promising them help. The 16th-century Humanist historian Johannes Aventinus writes that the envoys of Stephen and Gisela were present at the imperial diet of Regensburg in July 1027, where they announced Emeric's claim to the Duchy of Bavaria. After Conrad refused their demand, they declare war on the emperor, then returned home. While several 19th-century German historians accepted this data as reliable, Hungarian historian Gyula Pauler refused Aventinus' report saying it contradicts contemporary sources. Henrik Marczali argued that the young Henry, who was appointed Duke of Bavaria, diligently played a role in the German–Hungarian peace process (see below), so it is unlikely that the war broke out over the possession of Bavaria. Other historians, such as Bálint Hóman and György Györffy, however, somewhat accepted Aventinus' data as reliable. Gyula Kristó considered that although contemporary sources do not mention the Hungarian claim, Conrad's quick move to appoint Henry perhaps suggests this. Iván Kis argued that Aventinus highlighted Emeric's claim among the several reasons that sparked the war because he could thus accuse the Hungarian side of being responsible for the outbreak of the conflict.

==== Modern historiography ====
Several theories have been formulated in Hungarian historiography as to the specific reason for Conrad's invasion to Hungary. 19th-century historian Mihály Horváth considered that Stephen I joined that anti-imperial alliance which centered around Pope John XIX (however, by 1027, the pope became an ally of Conrad). Accepting the account of Johannes Aventinus, historians László Szalay and Antal Pór argued that the war broke out over the possession of the Duchy of Bavaria. Henrik Marczali saw the cause of the conflict in the unsettled border relations between the two realms. Bálint Hóman considered that Conrad decided to go on the campaign because he feared that the Venetian opposition, which aimed to overthrow the Doge of Venice, Pietro Barbolano, who had completely submitted to him, would, with the support of Stephen, appoint Otto Orseolo, who was in exile in Constantinople, or his son, Peter, who was being raised at the Hungarian court, as the doge of Venice. Gyula Pauler, Albin F. Gombos and András Borosy argued that the main reason for the war was to be found in Conrad's personality; the new German ruler wanted to conquer, taking advantage of the dominance of his empire. György Györffy argued that Conrad II, abandoning the peace-oriented diplomacy and the "universal Roman" aspirations of his predecessors, embarked on a new "German imperial" policy, using tools of military power. Attila Zsoldos emphasized that instead of establishing peaceful cooperation between Christian states, Conrad saw the establishment of German hegemony as a means of securing imperial power.

German historiography also dealt with the investigation of the causes of the war. 19th-century historian Max Büdinger found the specific reason in the Stephen's aforementioned refusal of the imperial envoy to enter Hungary. Wilhelm von Giesebrecht considered that the expansion of Stephen at the expense of the Poles created a hostile attitude towards the Hungarians in Conrad II. Harry Bresslau added that Stephen was prompted to go to war by Conrad's actions against his ally, Otto Orseolo.

== The war ==
=== German invasion ===
Disturbed on this account Emperor Conrad came upon the Hungarians with a great army. But King [Stephen], whose forces were entirely insufficient to meet the Emperor, relied solely on the guardianship of the Lord, which he sought with prayers and fasts proclaimed through his whole realm. Since the Emperor was not able to enter a kingdom so fortified with rivers and forests, he returned, after he had sufficiently avenged his injury with lootings and burnings on the borders of the kingdom.

— Wipo, The Deeds of Conrad II

Conrad II prepared for war in the early weeks of summer 1030. The emperor has spent the night in the Benedictine abbey of Niederaltaich near Regensburg on 21 June. Conrad organized the campaign and gathered his army here, summoning the troops throughout from Lotharingia to Ostmark. Armies were mobilized from many provinces of the Holy Roman Empire. Meinwerk, the Bishop of Paderborn, Henry II, Count of Luxembourg and Adalbert, Margrave of Austria were present leading their respective contingents. The 15th-century chronicler Thomas Ebendorfer incorrectly identified Ernest as commander of the Austrian troops. It is possible that Bretislav, the son of Oldřich, Duke of Bohemia and Conrad's vassal also took part in the campaign commanding the Bohemian and Moravian auxiliary troops.

The offensive under the personal command of the emperor against Hungary was taken in the first days of July 1030. The German army probably followed the military and trade route that was also used by pilgrims passing through Hungary, and later by the crusaders. The line of offensive is unclear except for the fact that Conrad had fighting units near the river Fischa. The German army was able to advance to the flow of Rába under difficult conditions. Hermann of Reichenau writes that Conrad "overran the Pannons [Hungarians] and as long as the swamps and rivers let him to do this destroyed everything in line of the River Rába". Both Wipo and Hermann highlight the effective use of natural obstacles as part of Hungarian defense. The legenda maior of Stephen I mentions that the Hungarian king had time to prepare; summoned the royal council of bishops and nobles, ordered a nationwide fast and prayer, and prepared a war plan. It is plausible that the king's son Emeric, based on his age, also fought in war.

By the time of the invasion, the Hungarian border protection system has been established along the border in Western Transdanubia. Extensive forests, swamps and wild rivers were given great importance in the protection system. The rivers Rába, Rábca (Rabnitz), Lapincs (Lafnitz), Zala and Mura (Mur) provided a natural fortification opportunity, as part of the system of gyepű (or gyepűelve). The roads leading through it could easily be made impassable by flooding, earthworks, and barricades in the event of an enemy attack. Stephen ordered to evacuate the region between the rivers Leitha (Lajta) and Rába. The Hungarians used the tactics of scorched earth by burning the fields, driving away the livestock and transporting the food reserves. As a result of these measures, the German army reached Rába with great difficulty; natural obstacles caused heavy losses, and famine surrounded the sluggishly moving army in the evacuated area. Consequently, Conrad and his invaders, just crossing the border, were not able to reach the central part of the Kingdom of Hungary. They probably did not even reach Győr. László Veszprémy argued that the German army was able to break through the first line of defense at Kapuvár and Moson because the Hungarians did not engage in serious fighting and lured them into an area surrounded by rivers and swamps, where they could cut off the invaders from their supply lines. This form of defense was so effective that no battle or serious conflict even took place.

=== The question of Bohemian invasion ===
In this year [1030] Duke Břetislav overthrew the Hungarians with considerable slaughter and laid waste to their land all the way to the burg of Esztergom.

— Cosmas of Prague: The Chronicle of the Czechs

The early 12th-century Czech chronicler Cosmas of Prague claims that, simultaneously with the German attack, the Bohemian army also invaded Hungary from the north. According to Cosmas, the Bohemian troops commanded by the heir to the throne Bretislav devastated the countryside of Upper Hungary on their route through the valley of Vág (Váh) and along the river Garam (Hron), advancing as far as Esztergom, which was then capital of the Kingdom of Hungary. Since no other source mentions this, Albin Gombos and György Györffy suggested that Cosmas confused the Czech attack with the later campaigns of 1042 and 1051, in which Bretislav – now as the reigning duke – actually participated, marching along the aforementioned route. Nevertheless, the Czech historiography (for instance, Miroslav Lysý) unanimously accepted Cosmas' narration as reliable, as well as some Hungarian historians.

=== Hungarian counterattack ===
The emperor's army, it seems, was so weakened without a battle that it had to retreat, which probably took place in the second half of July or early August. The legenda maior implies that after Stephen's prayer, a messenger arrived at the German camp, as if he were an emissary of the emperor, with the order to return home. Györffy considered that if this is based on fact, then perhaps Conrad's generals received a letter from Queen Gisela requesting them to stop fighting. The depleted army retreated at Rába and, having burned and destroyed everything, left Hungary demoralized.

The Annals of Niederalteich notes that Conrad returned to Germany "without an army and without achieving anything, because the army was threatened by starvation and was captured by the Hungarians at Vienna". Other contemporary sources, including Wipo, omit to mention the fact of the Hungarian counterattack. Veszprémy assumed that the Hungarians defeated the retreating troops near Kapuvár, then pursued them and surrounded majority of the German army near Vienna. Györffy proposed the fast moving Hungarian light cavalry surrounded the fleeing German infantry from three directions, from Pressburg, Hainburg and Sopron. Some historians considered that the Hungarians also besieged and captured Vienna itself, which, however, was still an insignificant wooden fort at that time. Harry Bresslau claimed that the Hungarians occupied only the town, while the imperial army remained intact. It is possible that Stephen and Gisela sent their envoys, as a result of which the German commanders agreed to surrender. Emperor Conrad II himself resided in Mögeldorf (present-day a borough of Nuremberg) on 19 September 1030.

== Peace process ==
And it was his [Conrad's] wish at a more opportune time to complete the things he had begun. His son, King Henry, however, still a young boy entrusted to the care of Eigilbert, bishop of Freising, received a legation of King [Stephen] which asked for peace; and solely with the counsel of the princes of the realm, and without his father's knowledge, he granted the favor of reconciliation.

— Wipo, The Deeds of Conrad II

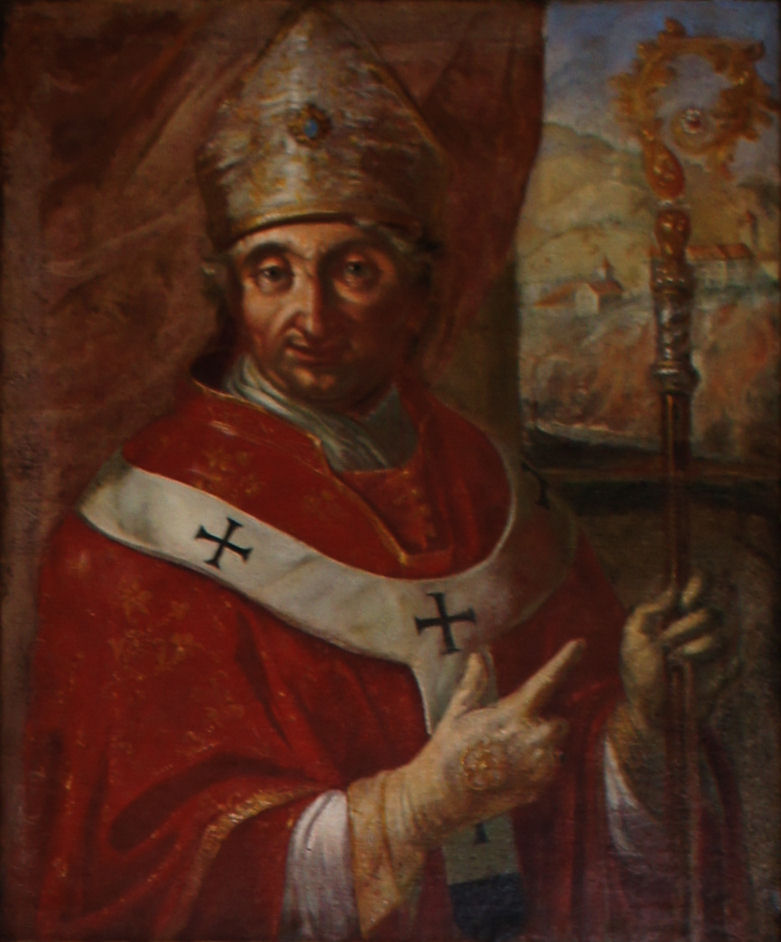
17th-century depiction of Bishop Egilbert, leading participant in the peace process

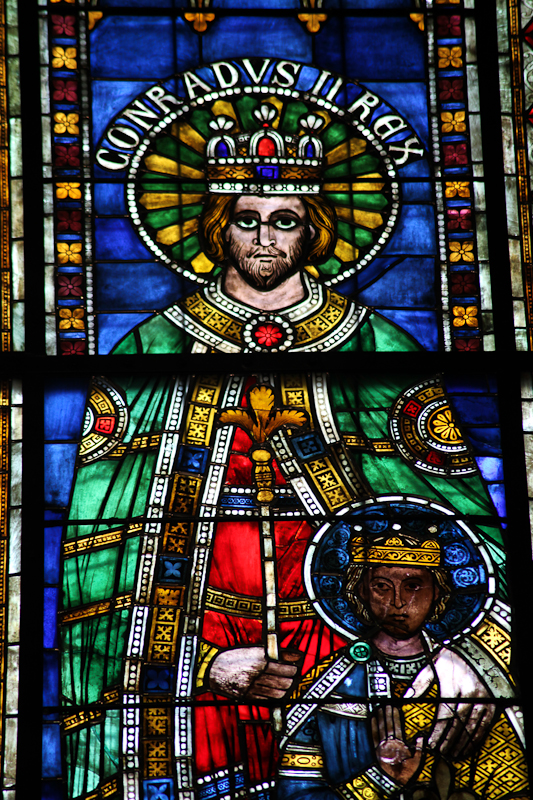
Conrad II and his son Henry depicted by a stained glass window in Strasbourg Cathedral

After Conrad's defeat, peace negotiations began, the length of which indicates that the Hungarians probably occupied larger areas in the Ostmark. Wipo narrates that Conrad's minor son, Henry, with the assistance of his tutor Egilbert, the bishop of Freising, traveled to Hungary and negotiated with Stephen's envoys. Wipo implies that the Bavarian duke acted without his father's consent and knowledge, at the instigation of the Austrian nobility. The negotiations in Hungary took place in the spring and summer of 1031, almost a year after Conrad's attack. The Annals of Niederalteich and the Annals of Hildesheim also emphasize Henry's involvement in the peace process. Some historians say that Conrad left Bavaria, assigning the task to deal with the Hungarians to the fifteen-year-old Henry. Albin Gombos considered that Wipo deliberately emphasizes that the peace treaty was concluded without the emperor's knowledge, thereby averting Conrad's responsibility for the sensitive loss of territory, though later German chronicles mention Conrad's participation. The other reason is that Wipo intended to highlight Henry's peace-loving and calm nature. According to Wipo, the young duke's extraordinary sense of justice and wisdom were manifested in his reconciliation with the Hungarian king, whose rights had been unjustly violated by the Bavarians. In fact, Conrad probably knew about the negotiations and was constantly monitoring their progress. For Stephen, only the emperor was acceptable as a negotiating partner, so Henry can be seen as Conrad's envoy.

Egilbert of Freising started negotiations with Stephen I of Hungary on Henry's behalf. Many difficulties arose during the negotiations, so several rounds of negotiations were necessary between the envoys. It is likely that the Hungarians claimed more territory than the Germans offered. Egilbert agreed to cede lands between the rivers Leitha and Fischa along the frontier to the Hungarians in return for the release of their prisoners. The Germans gave up the significant part of the Vienna Basin and the very fertile strip of land on the right bank of Morava and Thaya, all of them part of the Danube–Morava curve. For Hungary, the territorial gain meant a 30–40 km strip along the western border. Since the area was previously part of the Hungarian gyepű, it was suitable for the negotiating parties to build good relations between the two realms, as it was not actually shameful for the empire itself, only for the emperor, whose plans for conquest failed at least on this front. The ceded territories are only mentioned in later sources, from 1043 and 1051, when the Germans had already regained them. Henry accepted the terms and signed the peace treaty during a meeting with Stephen I in Hungary in the summer of 1031.

== Legacy ==
The unanimous position of Hungarian historiography is that the young Kingdom of Hungary, forged just a few decades ago, triumphantly withstood its first real test of strength since its inception. However, throughout the 11th century, its history, often linked to various internal conflicts among members of the Árpád dynasty, was accompanied by German attempts at intervention, whose intention was to force Hungary into a vassal role. The threat of permanent German feudal subjugation appeared as a serious threat and a real possibility in the history of Hungary. The repulse of the attack in 1030 had a symbolic significance, as in later Hungarian history people looked back on the victory of Saint Stephen from time to time and drew strength from it.

=== German chronicles ===
The armies streamed together with many a warrior from each empire. They did not fight equally well, however. The Bavarians succeeded with their spear thrusts in breaking through the enemy ranks. King Stephen barely escaped with very few of his men. He recovered at Rammerswert – but what misery reigned among the Huns! The cries of the poor wounded and dying began began to soften King Conrad's heart, and he ordered the great slaughter to cease and no more booty to be taken from those wretched dogs.

— Kaiserchronik

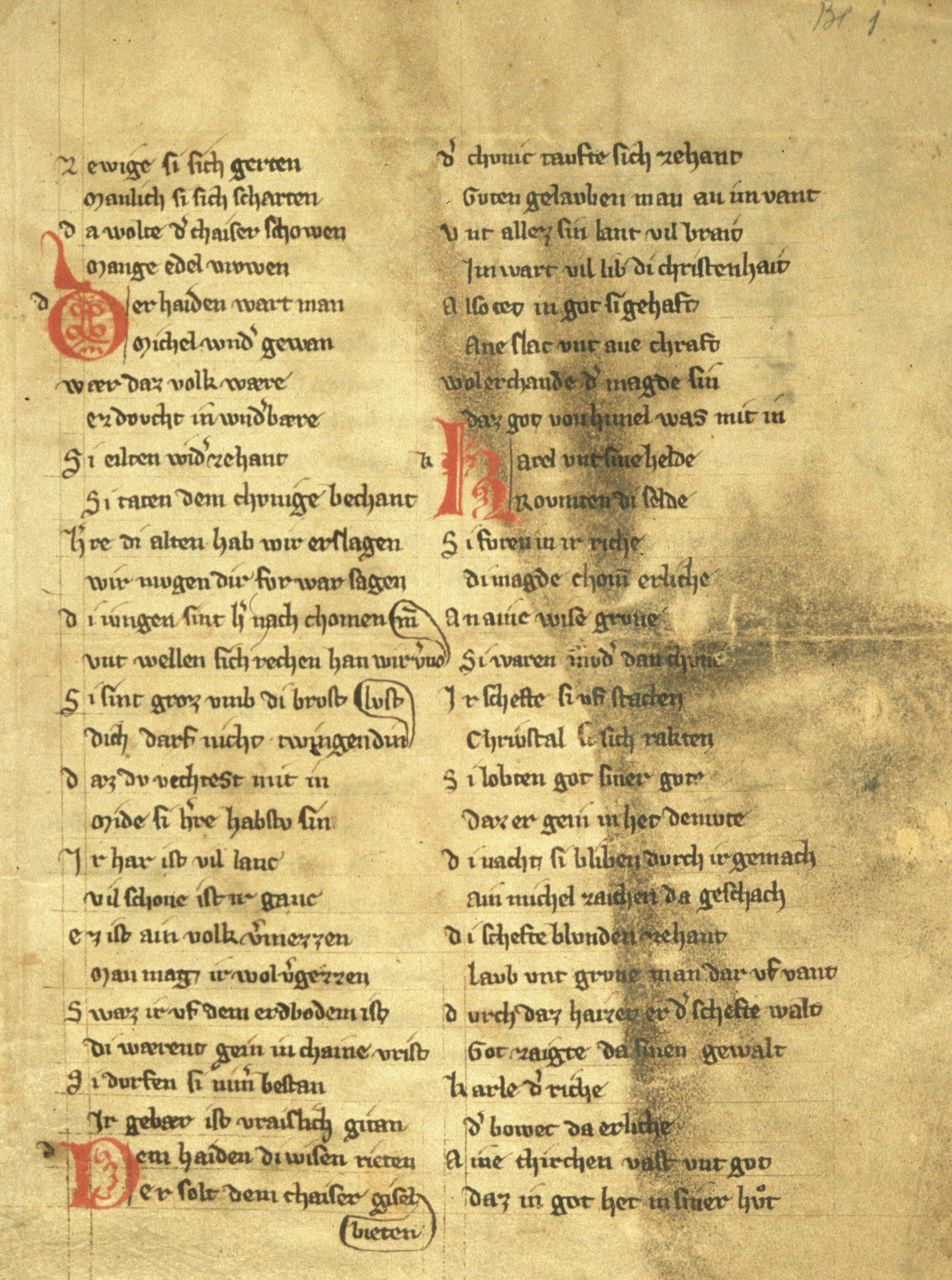
A page of the 12th-century Kaiserchronik, which presents the German failure against Hungary as a victory

Aside Wipo and Aloldus, the overwhelming majority of the contemporary or near-contemporary German chronicles and annals only mention Conrad's campaign in passing, without mentioning its details or outcome. In addition to the silence about the heavy defeat, the reason for this is that the German chroniclers, most of whom were clerics, were embarrassed by the attack on the country of Saint Stephen.

Many of the later authors and historical works (for instance, the Annales Praedicatorum Vindobonensium, Sozomeno da Pistoia, Matteo Palmieri, the Fragmenta Austriaca, Thomas Ebendorfer, Hermannus Cornerus and the Annales Riddagshusani), however, presented Conrad's campaign as a German victory. Gombos considered that these narrations confused the campaign with Henry III's later successful war against Hungary in 1042–1044. In contrast, Dániel Bagi and László Veszprémy argued that this is a deliberate narrative and false reinterpretation by the German court historiography, the first sign of which is the mid-12th century Kaiserchronik, which describes Conrad's campaign in great detail but omits to mention Stephen's sainthood. The chronicle presents the Hungarian king as a Western enemy, who delivers a speech to his army before the battle is taking place. During this occasion, Stephen calls his soldiers (whom the chronicler once calls Huns) to defend their homeland and preserve their honor, and revives the glory of the former Hungarian invasions westward. The Kaiserchronik also tells Conrad's alleged dream before the battle; accordingly, Stephen approaches the emperor on a ship, but before he could reach him, the ship sinks and then a black hound appears, which devours the Hungarians. Conrad interprets his dream as heavenly intervention in his favor; the sight of the wounded and dying softens his heart, thus he put an end to the killing and looting of the defeated Hungarians, and he let the fleeing Stephen rest in the nearby Rammeswerde. Thereafter, the Hungarian king send his envoys. The Kaiserchronik tried to reinterpret and rewrite the hagiographies of Saint Stephen, which also wrote about divine intervention, but with the opposite sign, on the side of the Hungarians. It is also possible that the Kaiserchronik drew on an older tradition in this regard, which was then reflected upon by the aforementioned Hungarian works.

Aventinus, who utilized Hermann of Reichenau and the Annals of Niederalteich too, constructed his own narrative in which the Hungarians appear as the aggressors. According to this, the Hungarians occupied Vienna during their attack, and Conrad then launched his campaign in retaliation. Aventinus also writes that the conclusion of peace took place after the death of Emeric, the only son and heir of Stephen. This is a deliberate distortion by the chronicler to fit his own historical perspective, according to which the Hungarians started the war through Emeric's right to inherit the Bavarian throne.

=== Hungarian hagiography ===
Immediately the next day, a messenger came to each one of the German leaders in the camp, as if sent by the emperor, who gave them the order to go back. After the withdrawal of the enemy, the holy man [Stephen], knowing himself to be visited by God's mercy, prostrate on the ground, gave thanks to Christ and His mother, to whose protection he entrusted himself and the rule of the kingdom with persistent prayers. In his turn, terrified by this sudden desertion of his soldiers, and inquiring how this had happened, the emperor [Conrad] understood that the messenger which caused their return was indeed not his, and that it was done through divine mandate, in order to strengthen the hope of the most faithful king; and from then on, Conrad abstained from attacking the kingdom [of Hungary], kept back by his fear of the eternal judge.

— Life of Saint Stephen, King of Hungary

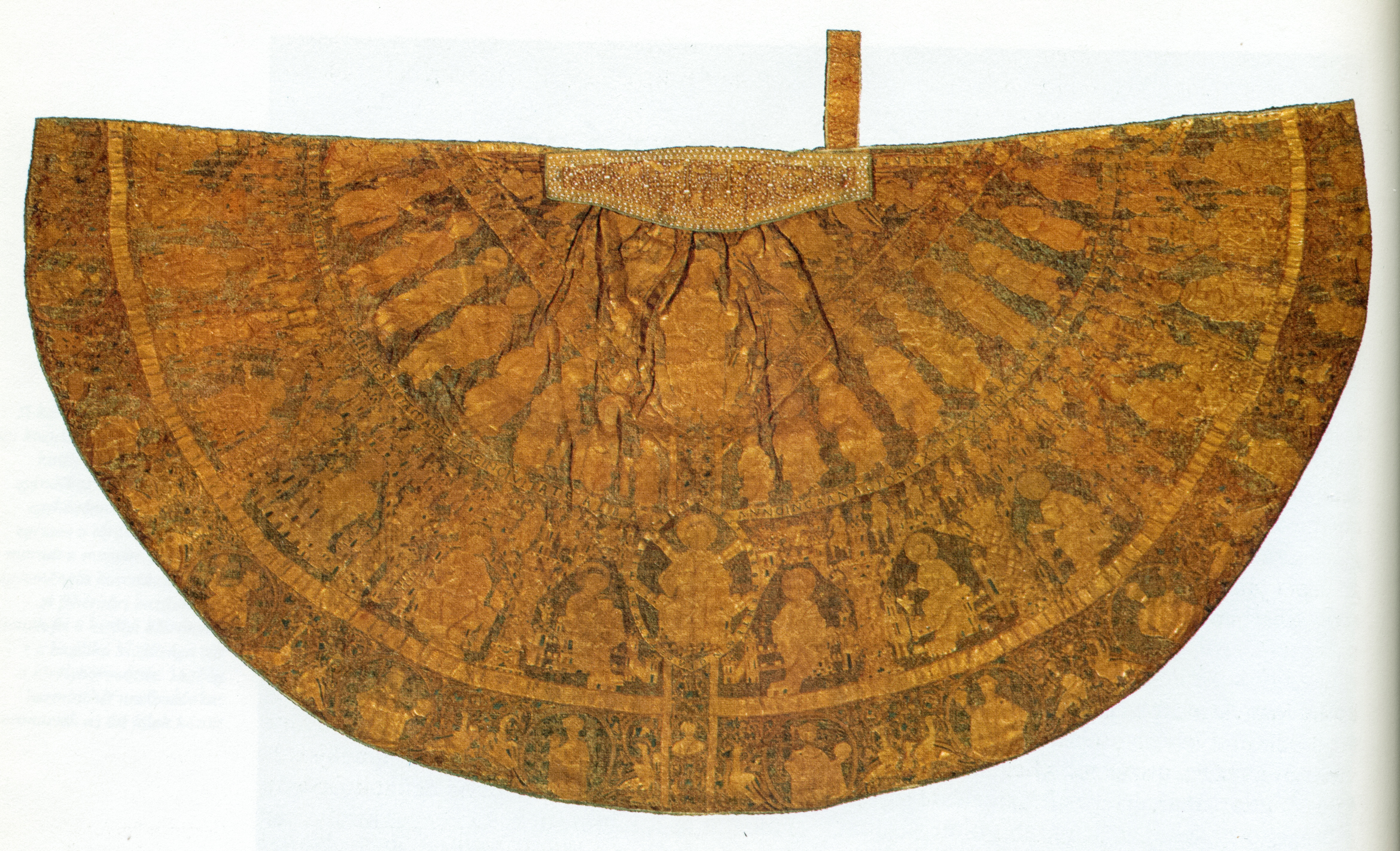
The coronation mantle is perhaps sewed in 1031 to commemorate the Hungarian triumph in the previous year

None of the several variants of the surviving Hungarian chronicle text discuss Conrad's failed venture to Hungary. In contrast, the hagiographies of Saint Stephen, who was canonized in 1083, cover the campaign in detail, through which they present the sovereign and holy virtues of the Hungarian king. The legenda maior, written sometime between 1077 and 1083, narrates that Stephen – while he summoned his bishops and nobles and ordered a general mobilization – he prayed to the Virgin, mother God that "if it pleases you, Lady of the world, to have the vineyard122 of your inheritance devastated by enemies, and to have the young implantation of Christianity destroyed, I beseech you, let it not be ascribed to my idleness, but rather to the purpose of your will. If the sin of the shepherd would merit anything, let him atone for it. I beg you, spare the innocent sheep". As a result of his supplication, heavenly messengers appeared in the German camp, who deceived the invaders into turning back.

While it is possible that the author of the hagiography was familiar with the Hungarian chronicle text, which mentions a similar divine intervention in connection with the German attack of 1051, the story may also have common roots with the work of Wipo, who also writes that Stephen "relied solely on the guardianship of the Lord". Based on this, literary historian János Horváth Jr. thought that the coronation mantle might be related to the vow made by Saint Stephen in connection with the German invasion, and that it might have been made as a votive gift. László Veszprémy argued that the author of the legend in the late 11th century had to use a miraculous event to explain the victory over the Germans and to refute the Hungarian defeat spread by the Germans, whose actual defeat may have faded in their minds after the 1040s successes and the recovery of the territories ceded to their neighbors in 1030. Bishop Hartvik, who compiled the official hagiography of Saint Stephen in the early 12th century, took over the narrative of the legenda maior regarding Conrad's campaign word for word.

== Sources ==
=== Primary sources ===
- "The Deeds of Conrad II (Wipo)" (2000). In Imperial Lives & Letters of the Eleventh Century (Translated by Theodor E. Mommsen and Karl F. Morrison, with a historical introduction and new suggested readings by Karl F. Morrison, edited by Robert L. Benson). Columbia University Press. pp. 52–100. ISBN 978-0-231-12121-7.
- Cosmas of Prague: The Chronicle of the Czechs (Translated with an introduction and notes by Lisa Wolverton) (2009). The Catholic University of America Press. ISBN 978-0-8132-1570-9.
- Klaniczay, Gábor; Csepregi, Ildikó, eds. (2023). Sanctitas Principum: Sancti Reges, Duces, Episcopi et Abbates Europae Centralis (Saec. xi–xiii) [The Sanctity of the Leaders: Holy Kings, Princes, Bishops, and Abbots from Central Europe (Eleventh–Thirteenth Centuries)]. Budapest–New York–Vienna: Central European University Press. ISBN 978-615-5225-28-4.

=== Secondary sources ===
- Bagi, Dániel; Veszprémy, László (2017). "Udvari és populáris regiszter a XI–XII. századi magyar és német krónikákban. Korai magyar és német elbeszélő források érintkezési pontjai [Court and Popular Register in Hungarian and German Chronicles from the 11th and 12th Centuries. Contact Points of Early Hungarian and German Narrative Sources]". Hadtörténelmi Közlemények (in Hungarian). 130 (3). Hadtörténeti Intézet és Múzeum: 451–466. ISSN 0017-6540.
- Borosy, András (1988). "A honvédő Szent István [Saint Stephen the Defender of the Homeland]". Hadtörténelmi Közlemények (in Hungarian). 101 (3). Hadtörténeti Intézet és Múzeum: 451–466. ISSN 0017-6540.
- Gombos, F. Albin (1938). "Szent István háborúja II. Konrád római-német császárral 1030-ban [The War of Saint Stephen against Holy Roman Emperor Conrad II in 1030]". In Serédi, Jusztinián (ed.). Emlékkönyv Szent István király halálának kilencszázadik évfordulóján 2. kötet (in Hungarian). Hungarian Academy of Sciences. pp. 107–132.
- Györffy, György (2013). István király és műve [King Stephen and his work] (in Hungarian). Balassi Kiadó. ISBN 978-963-506-896-8.
- Kádár, Tamás (2018). "A külföldi uralkodóházak tagjai, a külhoni hűbéres fejedelmek, valamint az egyházi főméltóságok és a pápai legátusok tartózkodásai Magyarországon 1000–1205 között [The Stays of Members of Foreign Ruling Houses, Foreign Vassal Princes, Ecclesiastical Dignitaries and Papal Legates in Hungary between 1000 and 1205]". Történeti Tanulmányok. Acta Universitatis Debreceniensis (in Hungarian). 26: 6–83. ISSN 1217-4602.
- Kis, Iván (2018). "Johannes Aventinus magyar vonatkozású információi – A bajor humanista történetíró szavahihetőségének problémája [Information on Hungarian-related Matters from Johannes Aventinus – The Problem of the Credibility of the Bavarian Humanist Historian]". Fons (in Hungarian). 25 (1). Szentpétery Imre Történettudományi Alapítvány: 49–86. ISSN 1217-8020.
- Lenkey, Zoltán (2003). "Szent István [Saint Stephen]". In Szentpéteri, József (ed.). Szent István és III. András [Saint Stephen and Andrew III] (in Hungarian). Kossuth Kiadó. pp. 5–118. ISBN 978-963-09-4461-8.
- Pauler, Gyula (1899). A magyar nemzet története az Árpád-házi királyok alatt, I. [The History of the Hungarian Nation during the Árpádian Kings, Vol. 1.] (in Hungarian). Athenaeum.
- Szabados, György (2006). "The Hungarian National Defense during the German Wars 1030–1052". Chronica. 6. Institute of History, University of Szeged: 72–81. ISSN 1588-2039.
- Szabó, Csaba (1995). "Die militärischen Aspekte der deutsch-ungarischen Beziehungen während der Salierzeit [The Military Aspects of the German–Hungarian Relations During the Salian Period]". Ungarn-Jahrbuch (in German). 21 (1993–1994): München, 1995: 1–18. ISSN 0082-755X.
- Varga, Gábor (2007). "Heinricus III. rex pacificus. Az Árpádok és a Német-Római Birodalom uralkodóinak kapcsolatáról [Henricus III Rex Pacificus. Of the Relations between the Árpáds and the Holy Roman Rulers]". Aetas (in Hungarian). 22 (3). AETAS Könyv- és Lapkiadó Egyesület: 35–58. ISSN 0237-7934.
- Veszprémy, László (2019). "A 11. századi magyar–német háborúk [The Hungarian–German Wars in the 11th Century]". Korunk (in Hungarian). 30 (3): 5–14. ISSN 1222-8338.
- Veszprémy, László (2024). History Writing and Historians in Hungary of the Árpáds (11th–mid13th centuries). Translated by Thoroczkay-Szabó, Mária. Arpadiana XVIII., HUN–REN Research Centre for the Humanities. ISBN 978-963-416-468-5.
- Wolfram, Herwig (2006). Conrad II, 990–1039: Emperor of Three Kingdoms. Translated by Kaiser, Denise A. The Pennsylvania State University Press. ISBN 027102738X.
