= Holy Crown of Hungary =

Coronation crown used by Hungarian monarchs

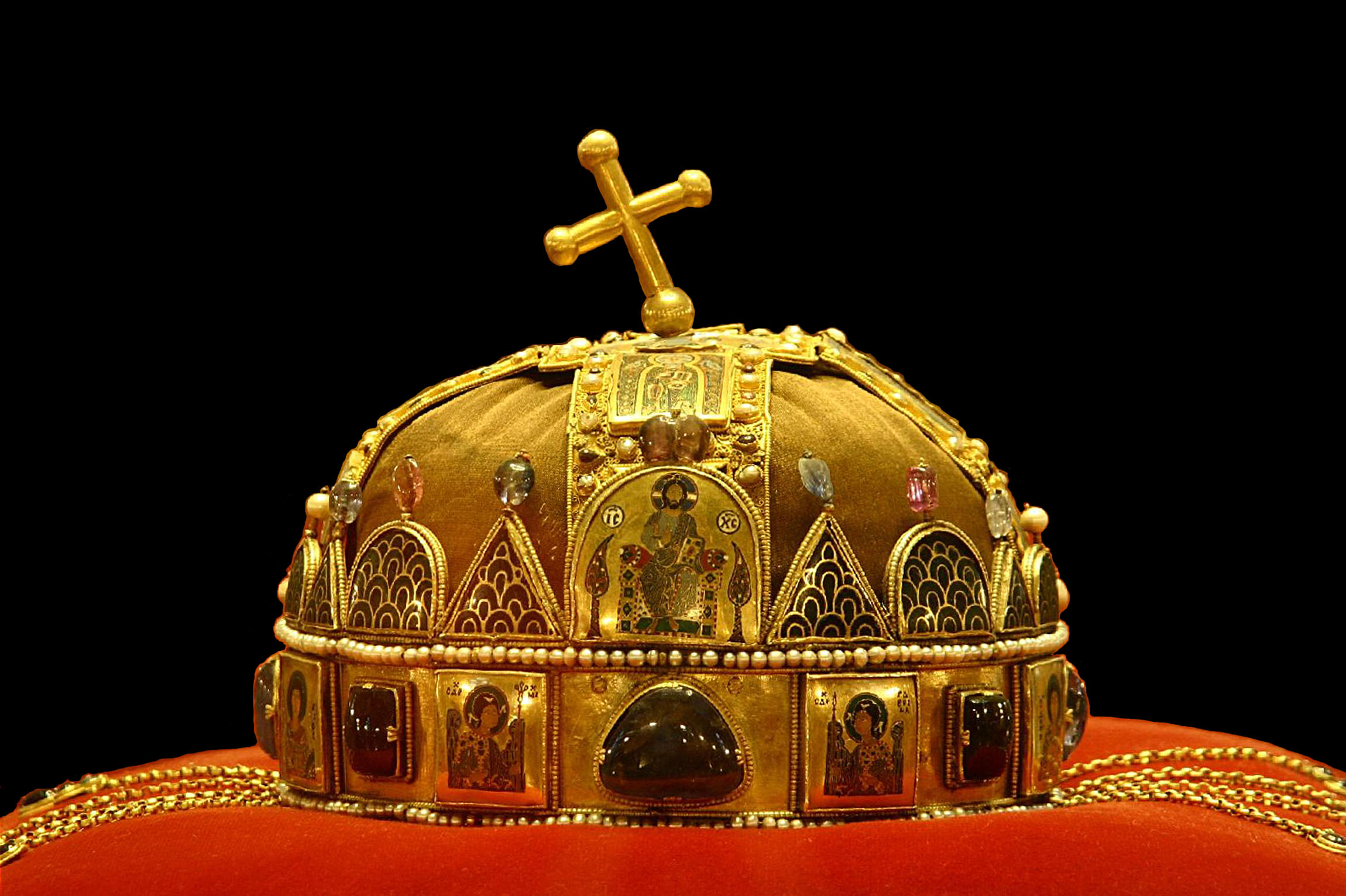
- Front of the Holy Crown

Heraldic depictions

Details
- Country: Hungary
- Made: XII century
- Weight: 2,056 grams (72.5 oz)
- Arches: 4
- Material: Gold
- Notable stones: Pearls and gemstones
- Other elements: Enamel plaques

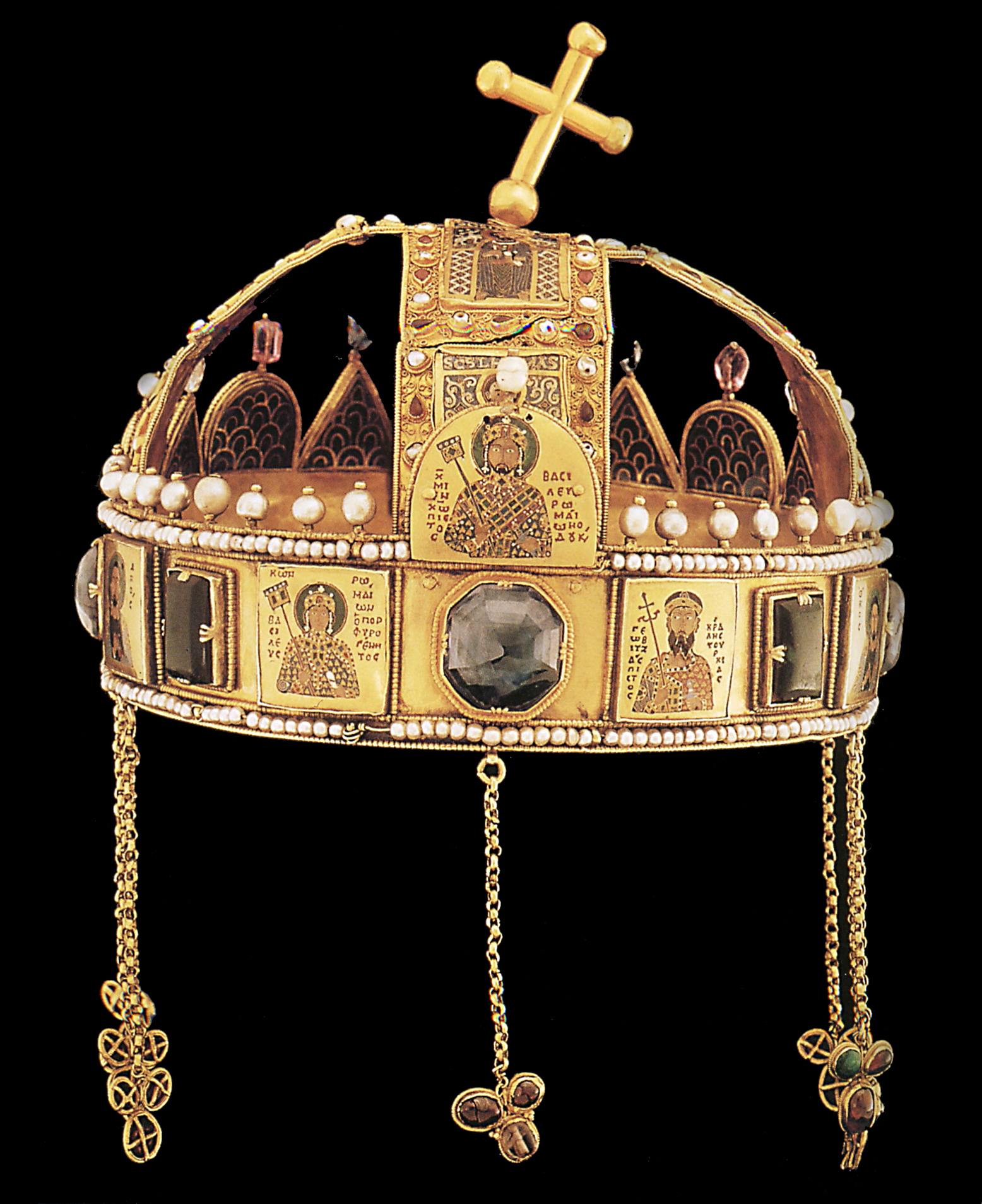
Back of the Holy Crown

The Holy Crown of Hungary (Hungarian: Szent Korona [ˈsɛnt ˈkoronɒ], (Note: German: Stephanskrone; Serbo-Croatian: Kruna svetoga Stjepana; Slovak: Svätoštefanská koruna) Latin: Sacra Corona), also known as the Crown of Saint Stephen (Hungarian: Szent István koronája), named in honour of Saint Stephen I of Hungary, was the coronation crown used by the Kingdom of Hungary for most of its existence; kings were crowned with it from the 12th century on. The Crown symbolized the King's authority over the Lands of the Hungarian Crown, and it was a key mark of legitimacy. Through the history of Hungary, more than 50 kings were crowned with it, with the last being Charles IV in 1916. The only kings not crowned were Wladyslaw I, John Sigismund Zápolya, and Joseph II. The earliest contemporary written source concerning the elevation of Stephen to kingship is the chronicle of Thietmar of Merseburg, which records the event within the political and imperial context of the reign of Emperor Otto III. According to Thietmar, Stephen's elevation took place at imperial initiative, and the coronation was carried out together with an ecclesiastical blessing:

"Imperatoris autem praedicti gratia et hortatu … coronam et benedictionem accepit."

The wording of the source ("coronam et benedictionem accepit") makes it clear that the elevation to kingship was not merely a secular act, but an event accompanied by an ecclesiastical blessing, which necessarily presupposes the participation of a church authority. This contemporary account of imperial initiative is complemented by the early 12th-century Hartvik Legend (Vita Sancti Stephani regis), which provides liturgical details of the papal mediation.

The enamels on the crown are mainly or entirely Byzantine work, presumed to have been made in Constantinople in the 1070s. The crown was presented by the Byzantine Emperor Michael VII Doukas to the King Géza I of Hungary; both are depicted and named in the Greek language on enamel plaques in the lower crown. However, in popular tradition the Holy Crown was thought to be older and of Papal provenance, dating to the time of the first King Stephen I of Hungary crowned 1000/1001. It is one of two known Byzantine crowns to survive, the other being the slightly earlier Monomachus Crown in the Hungarian National Museum, which may have had another function. The Holy Crown has probably been remodelled using elements of different origins. The date assigned to the present configuration of the Holy Crown is most commonly put around the late 12th century. The Hungarian coronation regalia consists of the Holy Crown, the sceptre, the orb, and the mantle. The orb has the coat of arms of Charles I (1310–1342).

The name "Holy Crown" was first used in 1256. By the 14th century it became the unique symbol of royal power. As written by Crown Guard Péter Révay, when Hungary needed a new monarch it did not seek a crown to inaugurate a king, but a king worthy of the Crown. He also said "the Holy Crown is for the Hungarians what the Lost Ark is for the Jewish people".

Since 2000, the Holy Crown has been on display in the central Domed Hall of the Hungarian Parliament Building.

== Specifications of the crown ==
The Holy Crown of Hungary with the coats of arms of its land (c. 1650): Kingdom of Hungary, Dalmatia, Croatia, Cumania, Lodomeria, Bulgaria, Bosnia, Galicia, Serbia, Slavonia. The coats of arms do not mean that all these territories were continuously part of the Kingdom of Hungary. Some were under Hungarian sovereignty or personal union, while others represented historical titles held by Hungarian kings.

- The shape is elliptic (width 203.9 mm; 8 inches, length 215.9 mm; 8½ inches) and is larger than a normal human head. During coronations, the king had to wear a leather 'kapa' liner inside the crown.
- The weight is 2056 g (4 lb 8.52 oz).
- The gold-silver alloys in the upper and the lower parts differ in alloy ratio.
- The lower part is asymmetric.

== Holiness doctrine ==
As with all European Christian crowns, the Holy Crown symbolizes a halo signifying the wearer's divine right to rule. According to popular tradition, St Stephen I held up the crown before his death (in the year 1038) to consecrate it and his kingdom to the Virgin Mary. After this, Mary was depicted not only as patrona (patron saint) of the Kingdom of Hungary, but also as regina (queen). This consecration was supposed to empower the crown with divine force to help the future kings of Hungary under the "Doctrine of the Holy Crown" (Hungarian: Szentkorona-tan).

Péter Révay, a Crown Guard, expounded this doctrine in his works Commentarius De Sacra Regni Hungariae Corona (Explanation of the Holy Crown of the Kingdom of Hungary, Augsburg 1613) and De monarchia et Sacra Corona Regni Hungariae (On the Monarchy and Holy Crown of Hungary, Frankfurt 1659). Under this doctrine, the crown itself is a legal person identical to the state of Hungary. It is superior to the ruling monarch, who rules "in the name of the crown".

== Origin ==
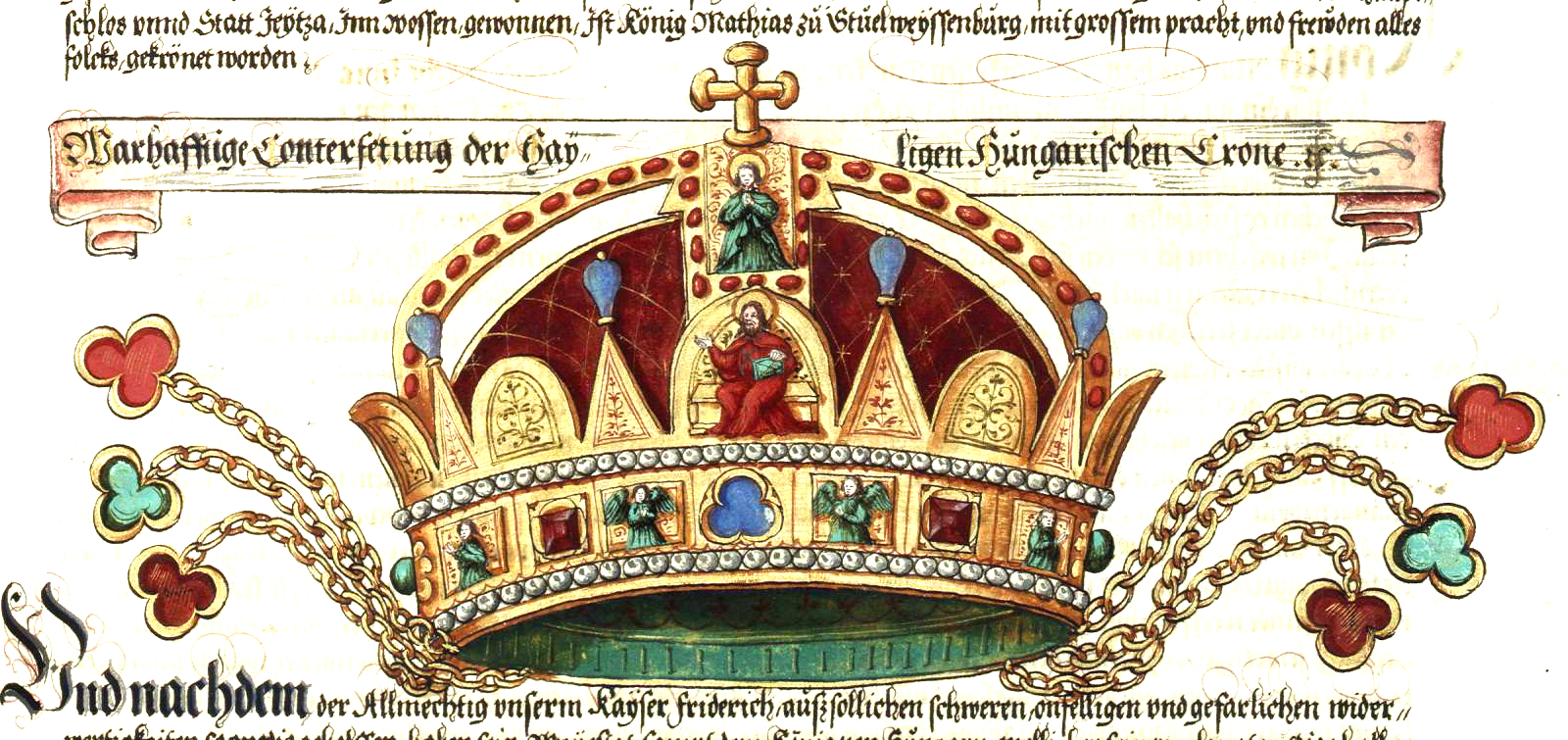
The oldest authentic representation of the Holy Crown from 1555. The crown depicted in the Fugger Chronicle. All images of the crown before the mid-17th century show the cross in its original upright position.

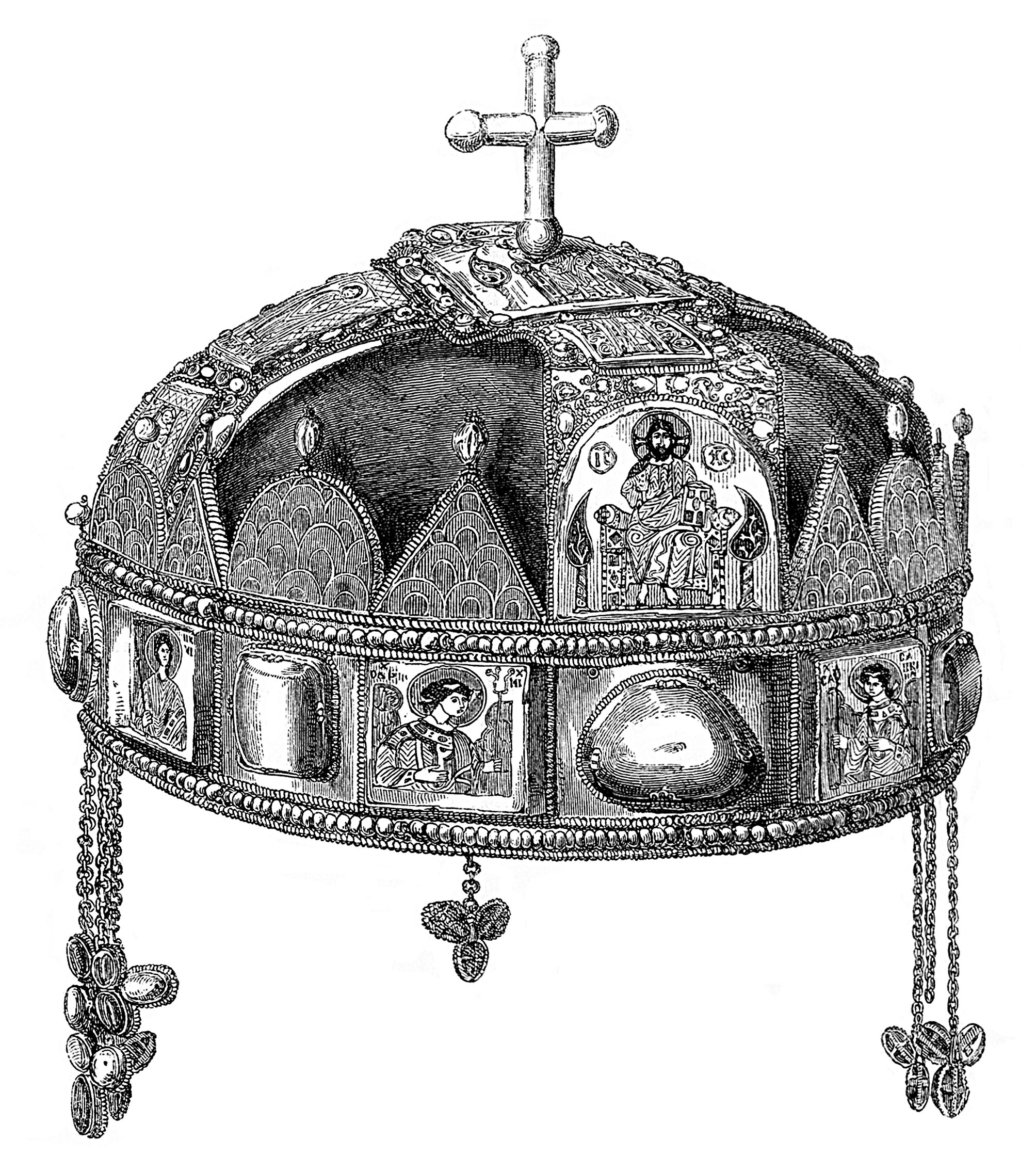
The Holy Crown of Hungary, 1857

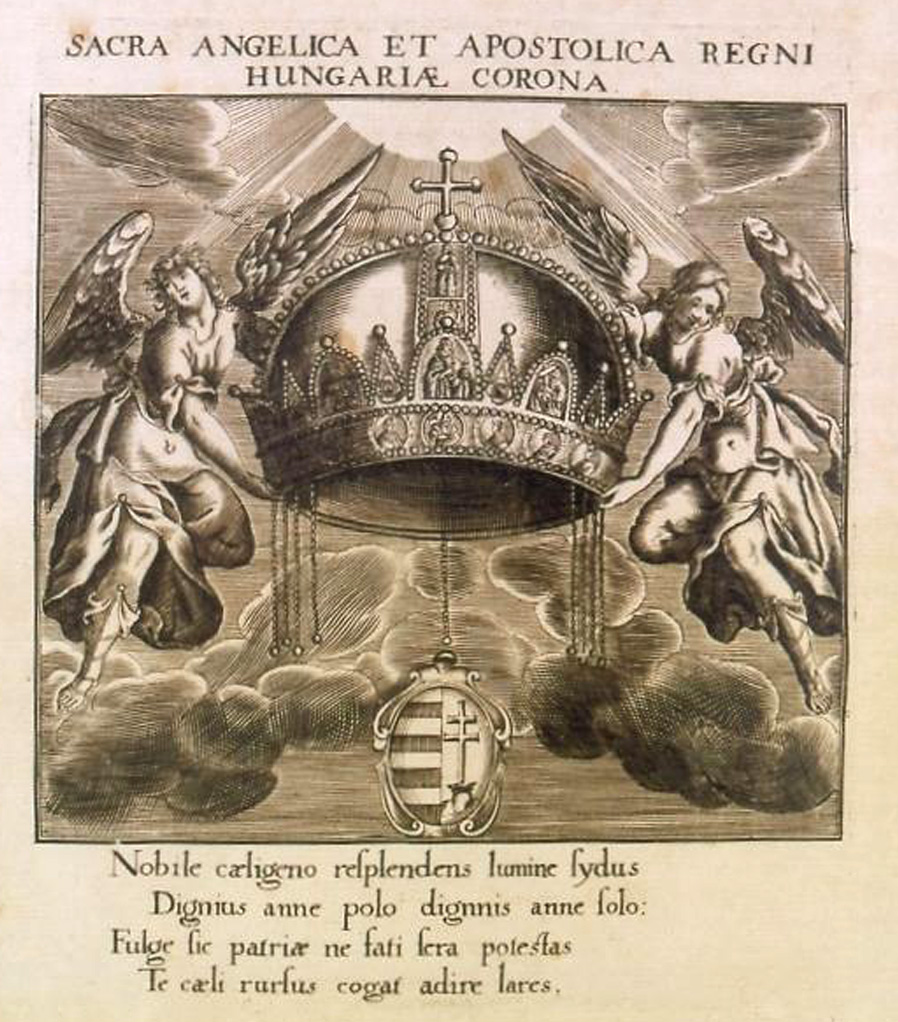
An Engraving from 1613

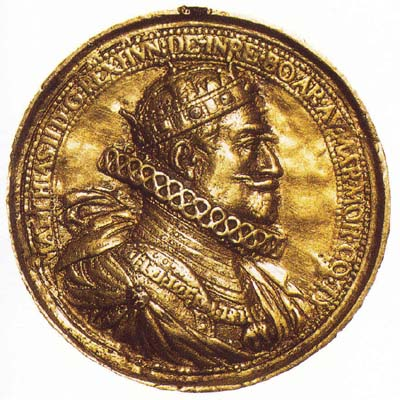
Matthias II of Hungary on a medal with the Holy Crown

According to the most accepted theory, in the publications of the Hungarian Academy of Sciences and the Hungarian Catholic Episcopal Conference, the Holy Crown consists of three parts: the lower abroncs (rim, hoop), the corona graeca; the upper keresztpántok (cross straps), the corona latina; and the uppermost cross, tilted at an angle. It is thought that it was created under Byzantine influence during the reign of the Hungarian King Béla III (1172–1196), who was brought up in the Byzantine court and was briefly heir to the Byzantine throne, or some other events around 1200. This was many decades after the crowning of Stephen I marked the beginning of Hungarian statehood, variously given as Christmas 1000 or 1 January 1001.

Another version of the origin of the crown was written by bishop Hartvik around 1100–1110 at the request of King Könyves Kálmán, in which the "Pope" sent King Stephen I "his blessings and a crown". According to "Hartvik's legend", St. Stephen sent Archbishop Astrik of Esztergom to Rome to acquire a crown from the "Pope", who is not named. Despite Astrik's haste, the envoy of Mieszko I of Poland arrived at Rome first. In a dream, the Pope saw an angel who told him: "There will be another envoy from an unknown folk, who will ask for a crown also. Give them the crown, as they deserve it." The next day Astrik arrived, and the Pope gave the crown to him.

Hartvik's legend appeared in liturgical books and breviaries in Hungary around 1200, naming the then-existing Pope Sylvester II. Subsequently, the story of the crown sent by Sylvester II spread throughout the Christian world, and was published in 1613 by the crown guard Péter Révay.

However, the legend is not supported by historical evidence. Mieszko I did not live at the same time as St. Stephen I or Pope Sylvester II. Also, the "Greater Legend" of St Stephen, written around 1083, makes no mention of the Crown's Roman provenance: "in the fifth year after the death of his father...they brought a Papal letter of blessing...and the Lord's favoured one, Stephen, was chosen to be king, and was anointed with oil and auspiciously crowned with the diadem of royal honour". Moreover, Vatican archives have found no record of the granting of the crown. Another document giving doubtful evidence is by Thietmar von Merseburg (died 1018): he wrote that Holy Roman Emperor Otto III consented to Stephen's coronation, and that the Pope sent his blessings, but there is no mention of a crown.

The question to what extent the upper part of the Holy Crown belonged to the crown of King Stephen I remained open until 1978, when the coronation insignia was returned to Hungary and a thorough examination was carried out.

The differing styles and techniques used in making the enamel pictures and the fact that the inscriptions on the diadem are in Greek and on the bands in Latin suggest that the two parts were probably made in two different periods. However, there are no known representations in which the crown is separated: the Holy Crown is always shown as one.

== Type ==
The Crown is a coronation crown, which should be worn only on the occasion of a coronation, and for the rest of the time two crown guards (koronaőr) guard it. Apart from this, there are only two other people who can touch it, the nádorispán (the highest secular title), who puts it onto a pillow during the coronation, and the Archbishop of Esztergom (primate of Hungary, the highest ecclesiastical title), who places it on the head of the king.

== Structure of the crown and its icons ==
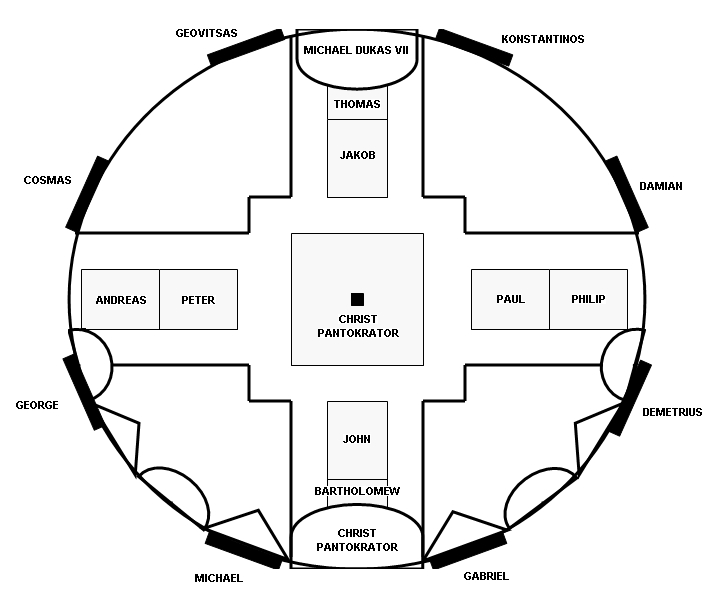
A sketch of the enamel icons of the Saints on the Holy Crown (top view, the crown's front side is on the bottom of the image)

The Holy Crown was made of gold and decorated with nineteen enamel pantokrator pictures (Greek, meaning "master of all") as well as semi-precious stones, genuine pearls, and almandine. It has three parts: abroncs (rim, hoop) (corona graeca), keresztpántok (cross straps) (corona latina), and the cross on the top tilted at an angle.

Four hanging pendants (pendilia) dangle from chains on each side of the diadem and one in the back. The crown has no monde.

Peer-reviewed studies published in 2024–2025, applying archaeoengineering investigative methods, concluded that the Holy Crown was produced as a uniformly planned and assembled structure, whose primary and structurally determining element is the cross-strap system. Through the analysis of manufacturing sequence, applied techniques, geometric reproducibility, and failure mode and effects analysis (FMEA), an independently verifiable technical method of interpretation was established for the crown.

One of the technical conclusions is that the hoop of the crown cannot be interpreted as a crown originating from Emperor Michael VII Doukas and later transferred to King Géza I of Hungary, as the structural and geometric relationships do not support this interpretation on technical grounds.

=== Corona graeca ===
The abroncs (rim, hoop) corona graeca ("Greek crown") is 5.2 cm (2 inches) wide with a diameter of 20.5 cm (8 inches).

The two aquamarine stones with cut surfaces on the back of the diadem were added as replacements by King Matthias II (1608–1619). The enamel picture on the front depicts Christ Pantokrator. On the rim to the right and left of Jesus are pictures of the archangels Michael and Gabriel, followed by half-length images of the Saints George and Demetrius, and Cosmas and Damian.

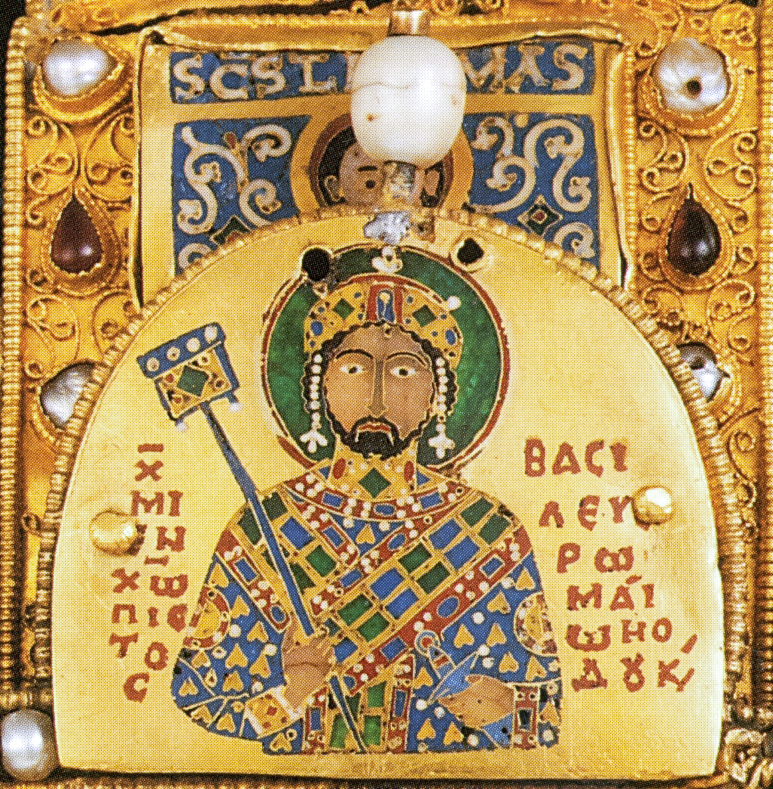
Byzantine Emperor Michael VII Doukas on the corona graeca of the Holy Crown of Hungary

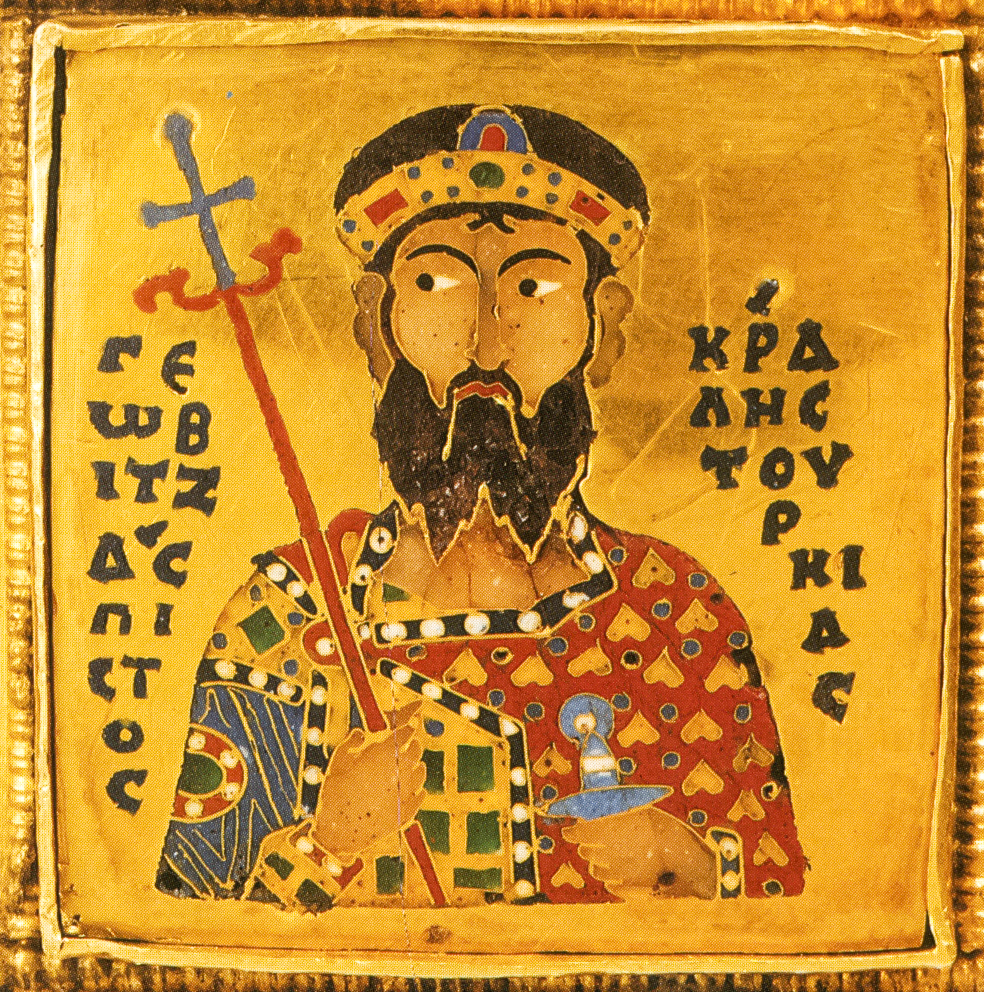
Hungarian King Géza I on the corona graeca of the Holy Crown of Hungary

In the arched frame on the back of the diadem Emperor Michael VII Doukas (1071–1078) is depicted. Below it to the left is the half-length picture of "Kon. Porphyrogennetos", this probably being either Emperor Michael's brother and co-emperor Konstantios Doukas or of his son and heir Constantine Doukas, both having been born in the purple. To the right there is a picture of the Hungarian King Géza I (1074–1077), with the Greek inscription: ΓΕΩΒΙΤΖΑϹ ΠΙΣΤΟϹ ΚΡΑΛΗϹ ΤΟΥΡΚΙΑϹ (Geōbitzas pistós králēs Tourkías, meaning "Géza I, faithful kralj of the land of the Turks").

The contemporary Byzantine name for the Hungarians was "Turks", while the Hungarian branch of the Eastern Orthodox Church, under Constantinople's jurisdiction, was named the "Metropolitanate of Tourkia" (Hungary), and the head of this church was the "Metropolitan of Tourkia" (Hungary). As was customary in the hierarchy of the Byzantine state, clear differentiation is made between style of the emperors and that of the Hungarian king by using a hellenized form of the common South Slavic word for "king" (Kralj) for Géza. The saints and the Greek rulers have halos while Géza does not. The inscriptions of the emperors' names are in red, while the Hungarian king's is in dark blue or black.

The enamel plaques on the circular band, the panel depicting Christ Pantokrator, and the picture of Emperor Michael were all affixed to the crown using different techniques. The picture of the emperor could not be attached to the rim in the same way as the Pantokrator picture on the front. The frame was folded upwards and the picture of the emperor was nailed to the edge. We can thus conclude that the picture of Michael VII was not originally designed for this crown, but was probably used first somewhere else.

The corona graeca with its pointed and arched plaques is identical to the form of the crowns of the Byzantine empresses – in other words it was a woman's crown. It was given by Emperor Michael Dukas VII to King Géza's wife, known only as Synadene, around 1075. The gift was not a new crown, but rather an old crown designed for a woman that had to be selected from the Emperor's treasury and remodelled. The enamel pictures that become outdated were removed, since they either represented earlier historical figures or were not appropriate for the Hungarian queen according to court protocol. It was in this form that the crown was sent to Hungary.

There is another view that the Géza depicted on the corona graeca is not King Géza I but St Stephen's father. This view is confirmed by the fact that Grand Prince Géza is depicted on the corona graeca without a crown, although carrying a royal sceptre.

=== Corona latina ===
The keresztpántos (cross straps) corona latina ("Latin crown") is made of four 5.2-cm (2 inch) wide gold strips welded to the edge of a square central panel (7.2 × 7.2 cm; 2¾ x 2¾ inches); the strips are usually assumed to have been originally made for some other object, and adapted for the crown. It is not an independent object, as it has no function alone. It was designed to be attached to the top rim of the corona graeca and provides a dome-shaped top.

The inscription on the pictures of the saints and the style of their lettering suggest the date when they were made. Amidst the antique-style capital letters, the T in Thomas and the second U in Paulus are formed in the style characteristic of the Latin letters used on Byzantine coins, a practice abandoned in the middle of the 11th century. They may have decorated a reliquary box or a portable altar given to István I by the pope, or possibly the treasure binding of a book. It is also possible, although it cannot be verified, that István I received a crown as a gift from one of the popes, reciprocating his – historically documented – gifts. The picture of the apostles (Peter, Paul, James, John, Andrew, Philip, Bartholomew, Thomas), however, based on their style, cannot be dated to around 1000. It is considered to be of Romanesque style, and created by Roman workshop in the middle of the 11th century.

The intersecting bands are edged with beaded gold wire that close off the lower end of the bands and finish off the system of decoration. There are twelve pearls on the central panel and a total of seventy-two altogether on the corona latina, symbolising the number of Christ's disciples (Acts 10.1).

The central panel is decorated with a square cloisonné enamel picture depicting Christ Pantokrator. Each band has two (altogether eight) pictures of standing apostles identical to the first eight listed in Acts 1.13.

Éva Kovács and Zsuzsa Lovag suggested that the corona latina was originally a large Byzantine liturgical asterisk from a Greek monastery in Hungary. In order to get it to fit into its new role the apostles at the bottom of each of the four arms of this asterisk were cut off before it was very crudely attached to the inside of the corona graeca to transform this Byzantine open crown into a closed crown (i.e., the type of crown proper to the autocrat, the senior emperor or monarch in Byzantine imperial protocol) and to provide a base for the reliquary cross at its summit (see § Cross).

Recently, Croatian archaeologists M. Ilkić and D. Filipčić proposed thesis that the crown of Zvonimir, the last native Croatian king and which was once believed to have disappeared, is actually the corona latina, as "the only plausible place where Zvonimir's crown could end up, while maintaining the legitimacy of the coronation of new Hungarian-Croatian kings and respecting the tradition and legality of the coronation of Béla IV's predecessors, is within the Hungarian crown". However, was soon disputed by the Croatian historian Mladen Ančić.

=== Latin cross ===
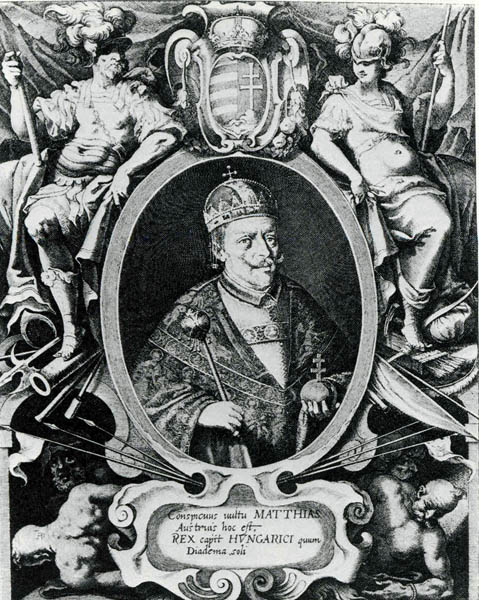
An engraving of Matthias II of Hungary, showing the cross in vertical position

The Latin cross is attached to the crown in a rough manner, rising from the midriff of Christ in the central enamel plaque at the top of the crown. This addition might have been made during the 16th century. The cross was knocked crooked during the 17th century when the crown was damaged, possibly by the top of the iron chest housing the insignia being hastily closed without the crown having been placed in it properly. The cross has since been left in this slanted position, and is now typically depicted as such.

Éva Kovács suggests that the present plain cross on the top of the crown is a replacement of an original double-barred reliquary cross containing three pieces of the True Cross and that it was the presence of the True Cross in the Holy Crown which made it holy. She states that "Szabolcs Vajay called to my attention a strange incident in the crown's history which had completely escaped everybody's attention. Before Queen Isabella handed over the regalia to Ferdinand in 1551, she broke the cross off the crown's peak for her son, John Sigismund. According to a contemporary Polish chronicler, John Sigismund wore this cross on his chest till the end of his life, "because he who possesses this cross will again come into possession of the missing parts which, subjected to the power of the cross, had belonged to it".

Later, the cross became the property of Sigismund Bathory who, persuaded by his confessor, bestowed it on Emperor Rudolf II. This was reported by an Italian envoy in Prague who also told the Isabella-John Sigismund story." She also notes that "Several small fragments of the True Cross were in possession of the Arpad dynasty. As a point of interest, it is precisely the smallest ones, those set into the cross on the chest, that are attributed to St. Stephen. About a tiny fragment of the True Cross, a Russian chronicler recording King Geza II's campaigns wrote that it had been the holy king's property and, despite its small size, it was a relic of great force. We are, perhaps, not off the track when surmising that the Hungarian crown was holy because it had once been reinforced with a fragment of the victory-bringing relic. . . we know quite few reliquary crowns. To mention but the most obvious example, let us cite Charles I's crown provided with a cross containing a thorn relic."

Later, it was the Crown itself, rather than the St. Stephen's cross reliquary that came to be regarded as holy through its traditional association with St. Stephen. Éva Kovács further notes in this regard the early use of the patriarchal or double-barred cross and crown in the ancient Hungarian royal coat of arms. Since reliquary crosses frequently take such a double-barred form, the use of a patriarchal cross in the royal arms would be a direct reference to and representation of this royal relic. This association between the crown and this royal relic would also help to substantiate the theory that the Holy Crown was always intended to serve its historical role of legitimatizing the position of its wearer as the true divinely appointed king of Hungary.

=== The crown as a whole ===
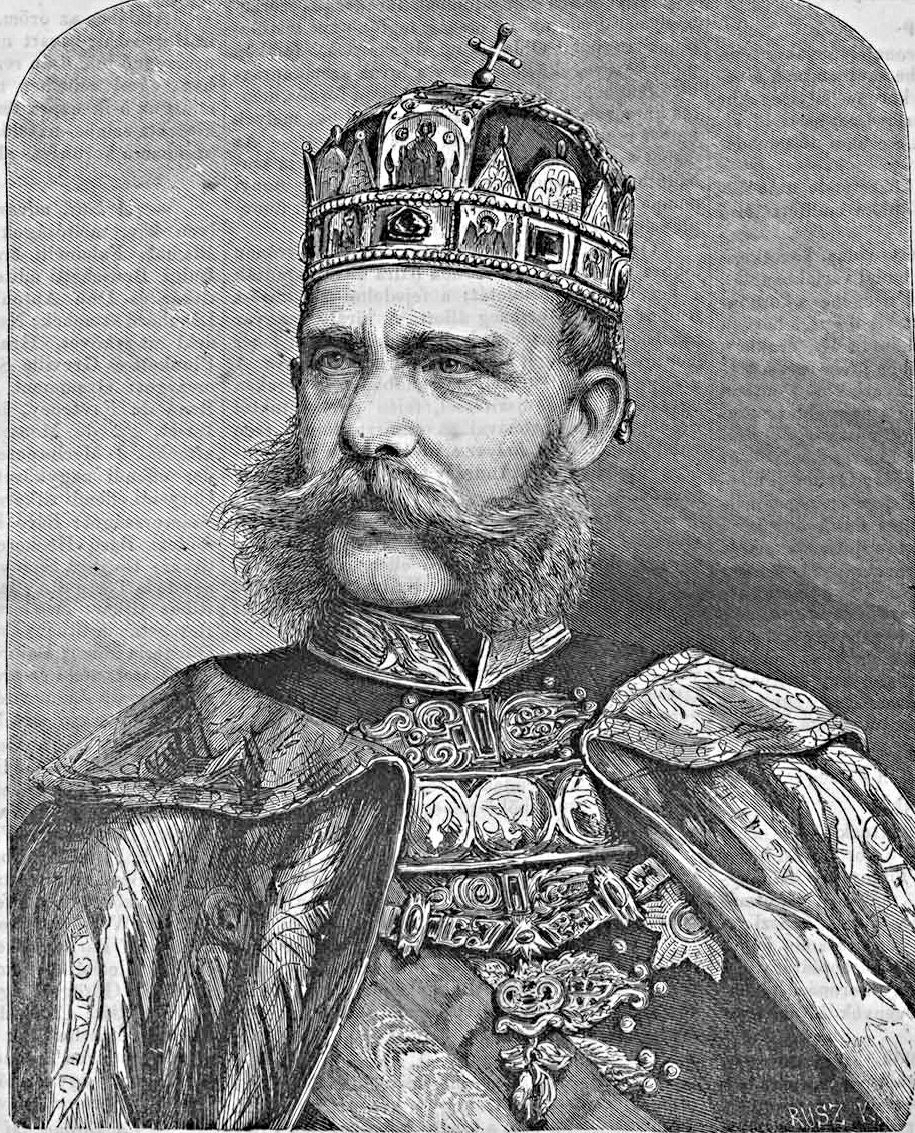
Franz Joseph I crowned with the Holy Crown as the King of Hungary

The form of the Holy Crown is identical to that of the kamelaukion-type crowns with closed tops, as introduced in the Byzantine Empire. The presence of multiple pictures is also typical of Byzantine crowns. When the intersecting bands were added to the corona graeca during the rule of Béla III, who had been brought up in Constantinople, the bands were decorated just as the corona graeca was, perhaps with the intention of imitating the Byzantine pattern.

=== Links to the first Hungarian king, Saint Stephen ===
Beside the using of the intersecting bands of the corona latina, which probably came from the treasury of St. István, at the time of the creation of the crown there existed further expectation that the coronation insignia would eventually include additional gold works that could be linked to the first, beatified Hungarian king, István.

The inscription embroidered onto the coronation mantle indicates with all certainty that István I and Queen Gizella had it made in 1031.

The coronation sceptre with the orb at the end can also be dated to the time of St István. On the seals of Henry II, Holy Roman Emperor, and Rudolph III of Burgundy, the rulers are holding identically shaped sceptres. Such short-staffed sceptres ending in orbs were not in use as insignia earlier or later.

== The regalia in modern times ==
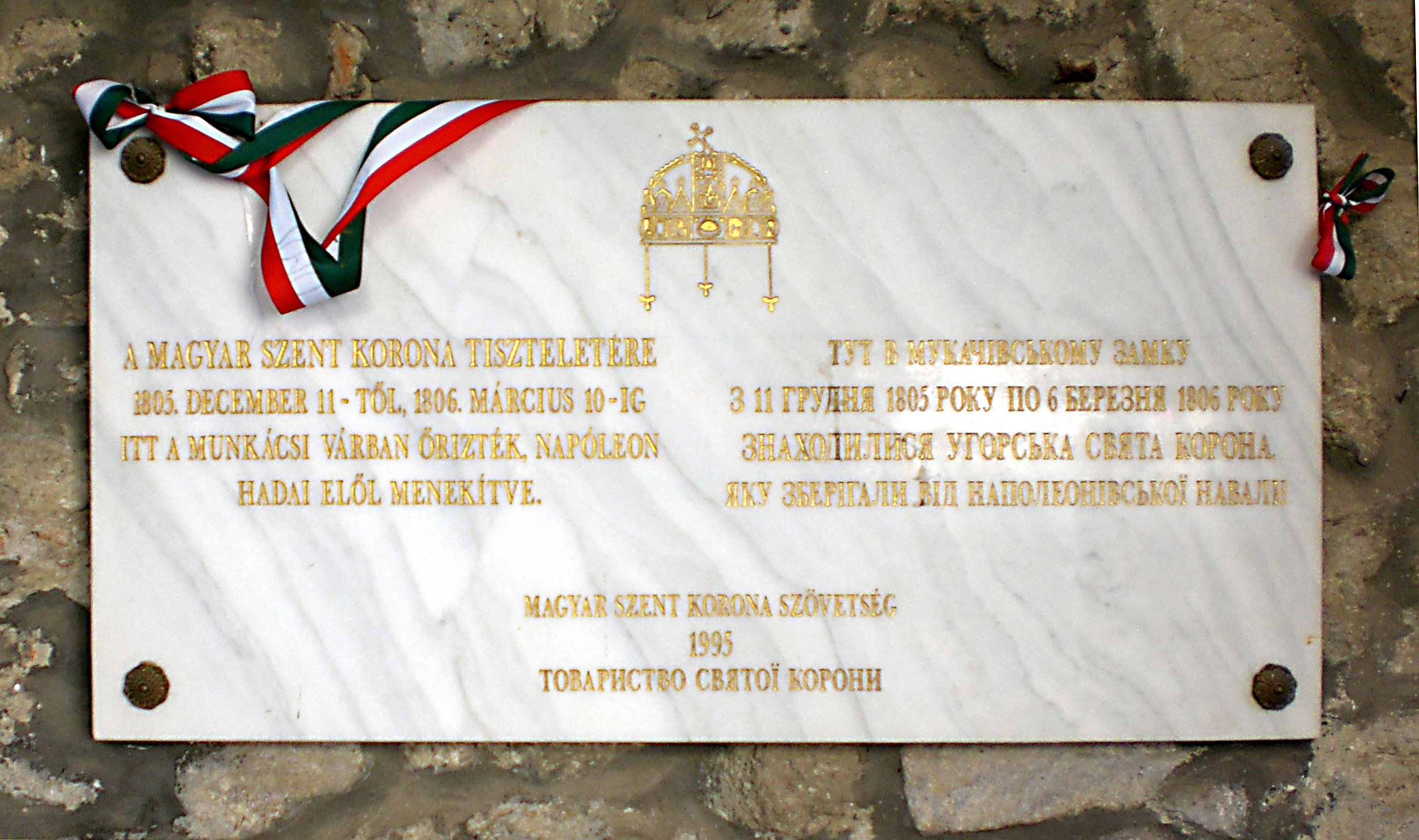
A plaque at Munkács Castle commemorating the guarding of the Crown there in 1805–1806

After the fall of the Hungarian People's Republic, the crown was reincorporated into the national coat of arms in 1990. The National Assembly chose the pre-war coat of arms over the crown-less Kossuth arms of 1849.

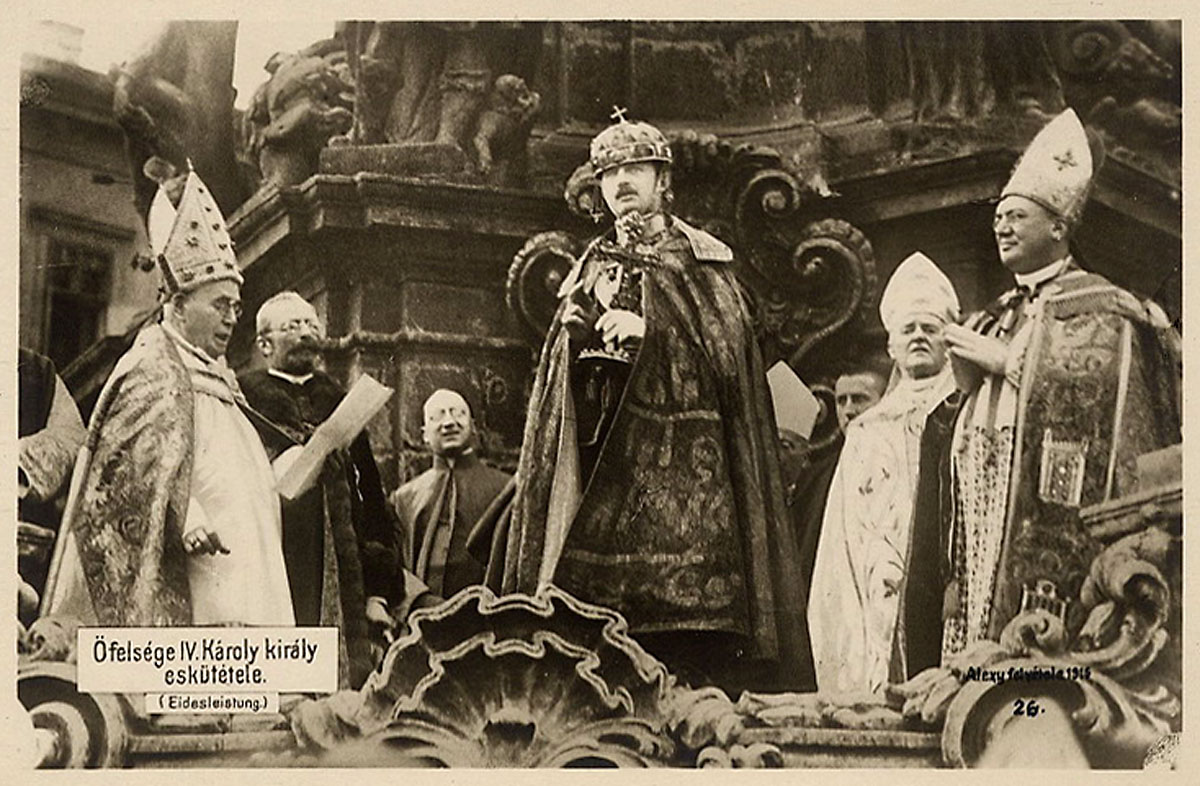
King Charles IV, taking his coronation oath at Holy Trinity Column outside Matthias Church (1916). To date, he is the last monarch to be crowned with St. Stephen's Crown. Notice the size difference between the crown and the king's head.

The coat of arms of Hungary with the Holy Crown on top

The Holy Crown has had a varied history; having been stolen, hidden, lost, recovered, and taken abroad several times. During the Árpád dynasty (1000–1301), the coronation insignia was kept in the coronation city of Székesfehérvár. Later, the crown was housed in one of three locations: Visegrád (in Pest county); Pozsony (present-day Bratislava, Slovakia); or Buda. In 1805–1806 the Crown was kept for about three months in the Palanok Castle at Munkács (now Mukachevo, Ukraine). Lajos Kossuth took the crown and the coronation jewels with him after the collapse of the Hungarian Revolution of 1848 and buried them in a wooden box in a willow forest, near Orsova in Transylvania (today Orşova, Romania). They were subsequently dug up and returned to the royal castle in Buda in 1853.

At the end of the Second World War the crown jewels were recovered in Mattsee, Austria, on 4 May 1945 by the U.S. 86th Infantry Division. The crown jewels were transported to Western Europe and eventually given to the United States Army by the Hungarian Crown Guard for safekeeping from the Soviet Union. For much of the Cold War the crown was held at the United States Bullion Depository (Fort Knox, Kentucky) alongside the bulk of the United States' gold reserves and other priceless historical items. After undergoing extensive historical research to verify the crown as genuine, it was returned to the people of Hungary by order of U.S. President Jimmy Carter on 6 January 1978.

Most current academic knowledge about Hungarian royal garments originates from this modern research. Following substantial U.S. political debate, the agreement to return the jewels contained many conditions to ensure the people of Hungary, rather than its Communist government, took possession of the jewels. The majority of the Hungarian-American population opposed the decision to return the crown. On 6 January 1978, US Secretary of State Cyrus Vance returned the Crown to Hungary in Budapest.

== Other coronation regalia ==
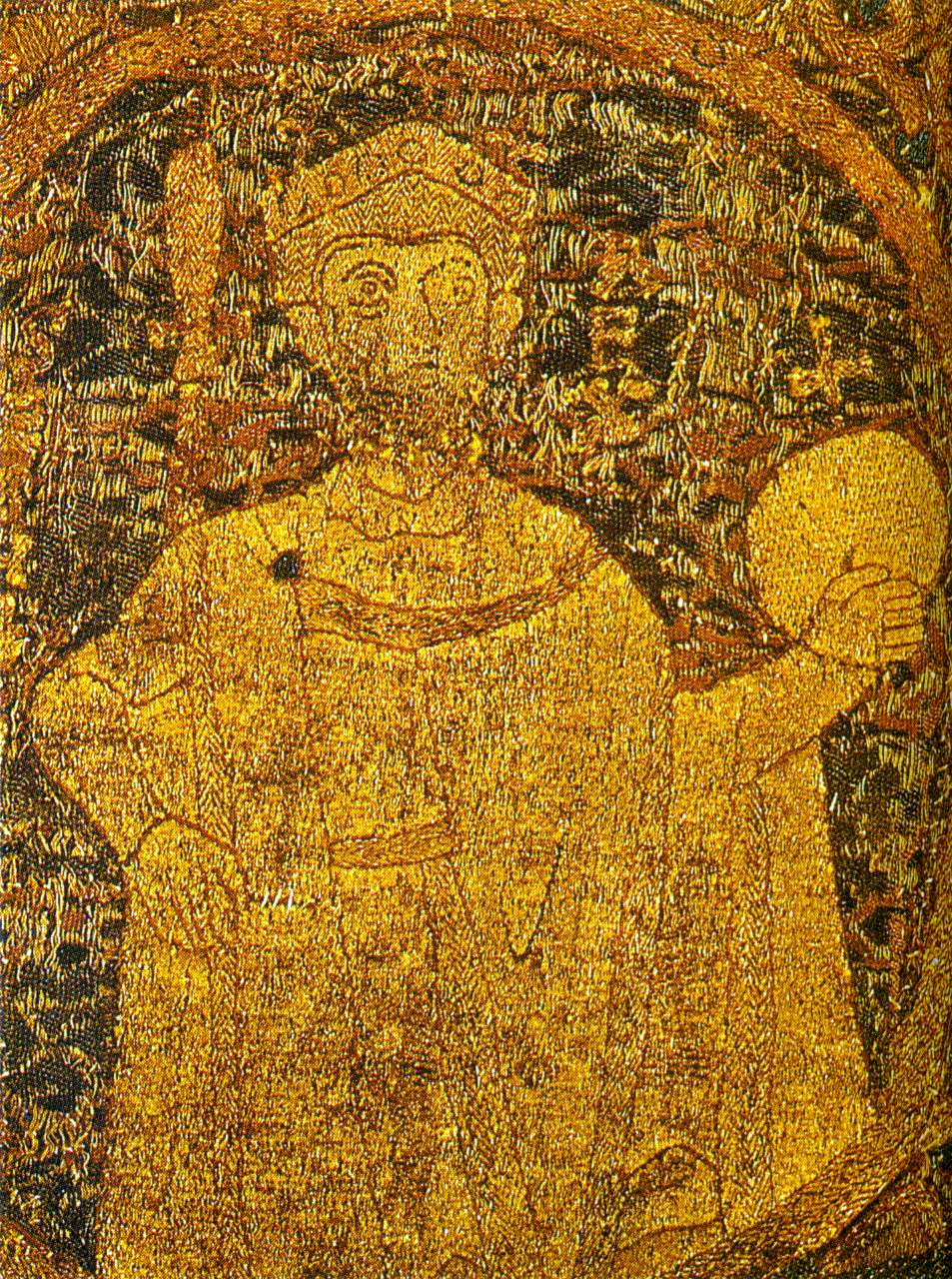
The portrayal of Stephen I on the Hungarian coronation pall from 1031

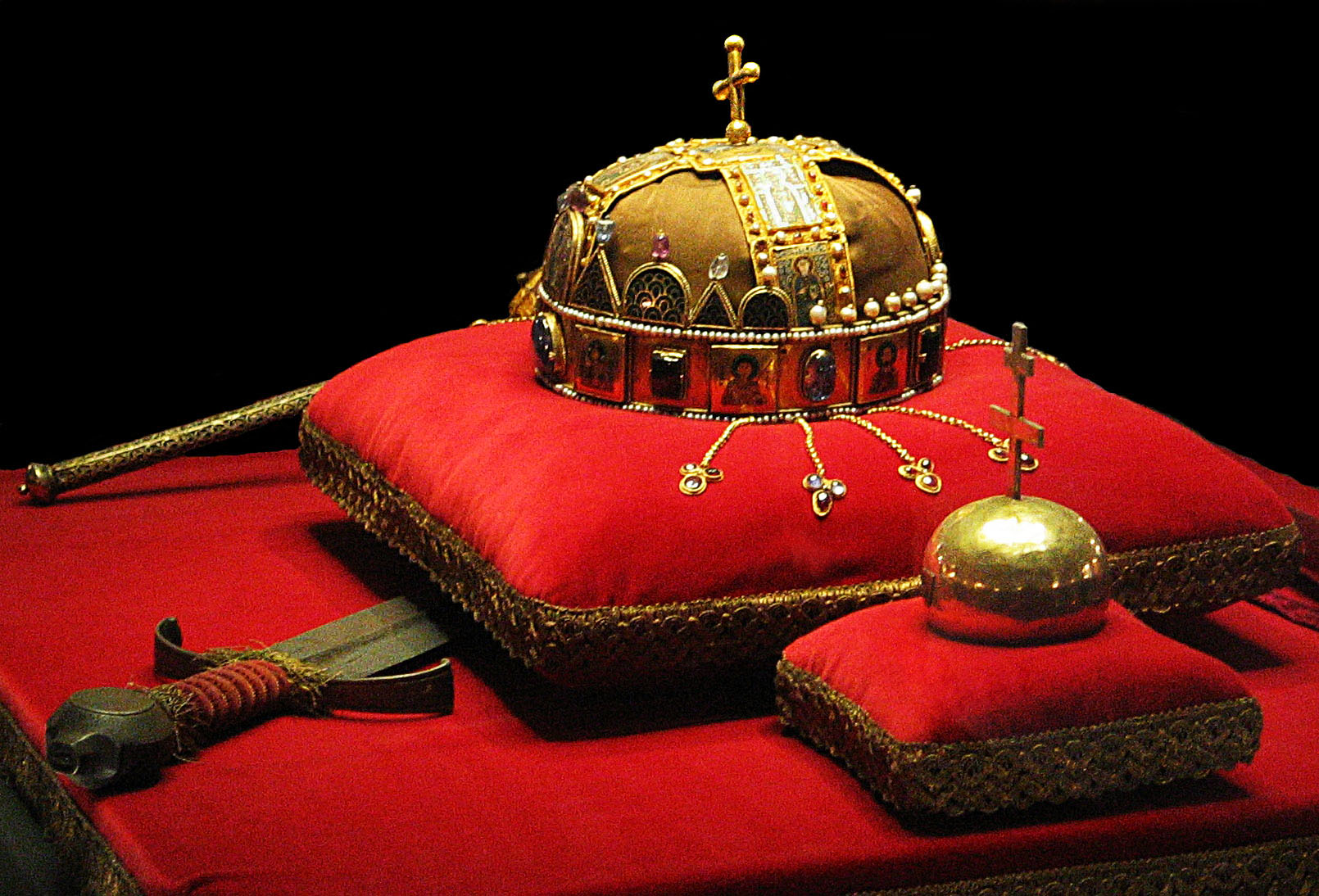
The Crown, Sword, Sceptre and Globus Cruciger of Hungary, in the Hungarian Parliament Building

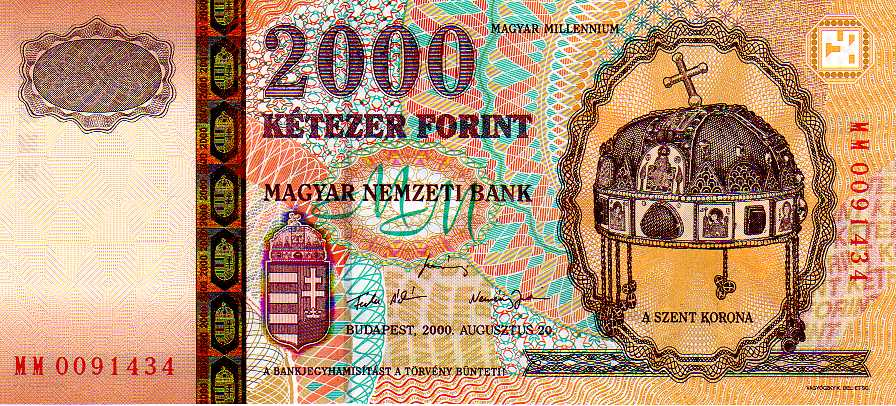
The Holy Crown on the commemorative 2000 HUF banknote, issued in 2000, the millennium anniversary of the coronation of King Saint Stephen

Uniquely in Europe, most of the medieval ensemble of coronation regalia has survived. On 1 January 2000, the Holy Crown of Hungary was moved to the Hungarian Parliament Building from the Hungarian National Museum. The sceptre, orb and the coronation sword were also moved to the Parliament.

The very large coronation mantle remains in a glass inert gas vault at the National Museum due to its delicate, faint condition. Unlike the crown and accompanying insignia, the originally red coloured mantle is considered to date back to Stephen I, and was made circa 1030. Old records describe the robe as handiwork of the queen and her sisters and the mantle's middle back bears the king's only known portrait (which shows his crown was not the currently existing one). A circular inscription sewn in Latin identifies the coat as a bishop's chasuble.

The sceptre is considered the artistically most valuable piece of the Hungarian royal inventory. It contains a solid rock crystal ball decorated with engraved lions, a rare product of the 10th-century Fatimid caliphate. Its handle contains a wooden rod surrounded by very fine wrought silver ornaments.

The orb is unusual in having a patriarchal cross instead of a simple cross, as on the crown.

The ceremonial straight sword kept in the Holy Crown collection is a 14th-century Italian product. However, what is said to be an original coronation sword of Stephen I has been in Prague's St. Vitus Cathedral since 1368.

A lance claimed to have belonged to King Stephen I, and seen in the Mantle portrait, was reportedly obtained by the Holy Roman Emperor circa 1100.

== See also ==
- Hungarian Crown
- Crown jewels
- Holy Crown Society
