= Egilbert (bishop of Freising) =

German bishop from 1005 to 1035

Egilbert was bishop of Freising in Germany from 1005 to 1035. He was the tutor of Henry, Duke of Bavaria—the future Henry III, Holy Roman Emperor—between 1029 and 1033. On behalf of the duke, Egilbert negotiated the peace with the Kingdom of Hungary in 1031, after Emperor Conrad II's failed invasion occurred in the previous year.

== Sources ==
- Weinfurter, Stefan (1999). The Salian Century: Main Currents in an Age of Transition. The Middle Ages. Translated by Bowlus, Barbara M. University of Pennsylvania Press. ISBN 0-8122-3508-8.
- Wolfram, Herwig (2006). Conrad II, 990–1039: Emperor of Three Kingdoms. Translated by Kaiser, Denise A. The Pennsylvania State University Press. ISBN 0-271-02738-X.
