= Legenda Hartviciana =

Official hagiography of St. Stephen

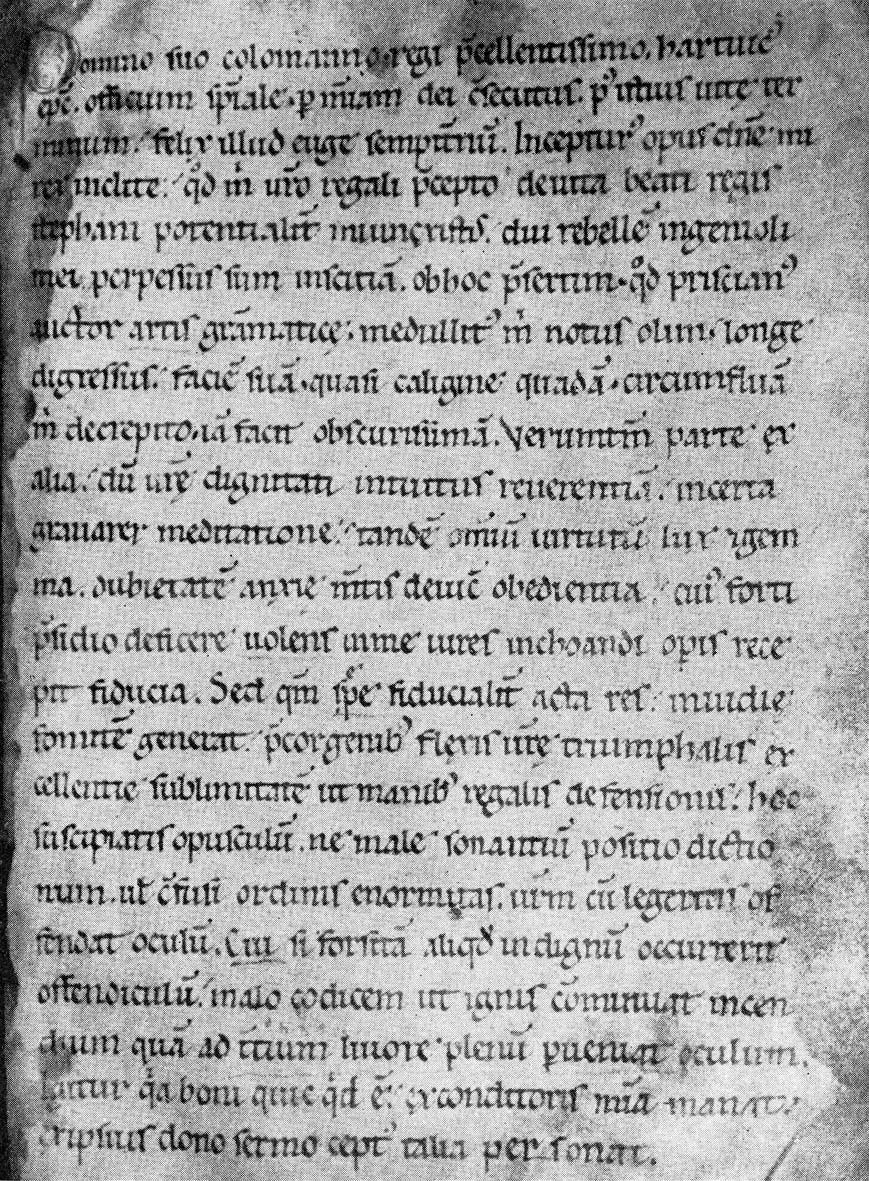
The first page of the earliest version of the Legenda Hartviciana preserved in a 12th-century codex kept in Frankfurt until 1814

The Legenda Hartviciana or Vita Hartviciana, also anglicized as the Life of King Stephen of Hungary by Hartvic (Hungarian: Hartvik-féle Szent István-legenda), is the official hagiography of St. Stephen, the first King of Hungary. It was compiled by Hartvik, the bishop of Győr during the reign of Coloman the Book-lover at the turn of the 11th and 12th centuries, based on the holy king's two earlier hagiographies (Legenda maior and Legenda minor). Beside the veneration of Stephen I, the work served the actual political purposes of Coloman against the Holy See. Pope Innocent III sanctioned the Legenda Hartviciana as the official hagiography of Stephen I of Hungary in 1201.

== Sources ==
=== Primary sources ===
- "Hartvic, Life of King Stephen of Hungary" (Translated by Nora Berend) (2001). In Head, Thomas. Medieval Hagiography: An Anthology. Routledge. pp. 378–398. ISBN 0-415-93753-1.

=== Secondary sources ===
- Csákó, Judit (2013). "Quelques remarques à propos de la tradition textuelle de la Chronique hungaro–polonaise: La relation de la chronique à la Légende de Hartvic [Some Remarks on the Textual Tradition of the Hungarian–Polish Chronicle: The Relation of the Chronicle to the Legend of Hartvic]". Specimina nova. Pars prima, Sectio mediaevalis: dissertationes historicae collectae per Cathedra Historiae Medii Aevi Modernorumque Temporum Universitatis Quinqueecclesiensis (in French). 7. University of Pécs: 125–146. ISSN 1588-8002.
- Gerics, József (1981). "A Hartvik-legenda mintáiról és forrásairól [On the Models and Sources of the Vita Hartviciana Sancti Stephani regis Hungariae]". Magyar Könyvszemle (in Hungarian). 97 (3): 175–188. ISSN 0025-0171.
- Gerics, József; Ladányi, Erzsébet (2004). "A Hartvik legenda keletkezési körülményeiről [About the Circumstances of the Origin of the Legenda Hartviciana]". Magyar Könyvszemle (in Hungarian). 120 (4): 317–324. ISSN 0025-0171.
- Kristó, Gyula (1990). "A nagyobbik és a Hartvik-féle István legenda szövegkapcsolatához [To the Text Relationship of the Legenda Maior and the Legenda Hartviciana]". Acta Universitatis Szegediensis de Attila József nominatae. Acta Historica (in Hungarian). 90. MTA-SZTE-MOL Magyar Medievisztikai Kutatócsoport: 43–62. ISSN 0324-6965.
- Pražák, Richard (1985). "The Legends of King Stephen". Hungarian Studies. 1 (2). Akadémiai Kiadó: 163–178.
- Teiszler, Éva (2013). "A Hartvik-legenda XIV. századi oklevelekben fennmaradt változatai [Variants of the Legenda Hartviciana Preserved in 14th-Century Charters]". In Kovács, Szilvia; Révész, Éva (eds.). Műhelyszemináriumi dolgozatok I. (in Hungarian). SZTE BTK Történelemtudományi Doktori Iskola. pp. 131–144. ISBN 978-963-306-187-9.
- Thoroczkay, Gábor (2003). "A Hartvik-legenda a XIX–XX. századi történetírásban [Hartvik's Legends in the 19–20th Century Historiography]". Fons (in Hungarian). 10 (1). Szentpétery Imre Történettudományi Alapítvány: 21–64. ISSN 1217-8020.
- Thoroczkay, Gábor (2005). "Még egyszer a Hartvik-féle Szent István-legenda datálásáról [Once Again about the Dating of Hartvik's Saint Stephen Legend]". Magyar Könyvszemle (in Hungarian). 121 (2): 213–218. ISSN 0025-0171.
- Thoroczkay, Gábor (2009). "Megjegyzések a Hartvik-féle Szent István-legenda datálásának kérdéséhez [Comments to the Question of the Date of Hartvic's Life of King Stephen of Hungary]". In Thoroczkay, Gábor (ed.). Írások az Árpád-korról. Történeti és historiográfiai tanulmányok [Papers on Árpád Age. Historical and Historiographical Studies] (in Hungarian). L'Harmattan Kiadó. pp. 67–87. ISBN 978-963-236-165-9.
- Tóth, Zoltán (1942). A Hartvik-legenda kritikájához [A Critical Analysis of the Legenda Hartviciana] (in Hungarian). Ranschburg Gusztáv Könyvkereskedése.
