= Hungarian crown jewels =

Regalia of the monarch of Hungary

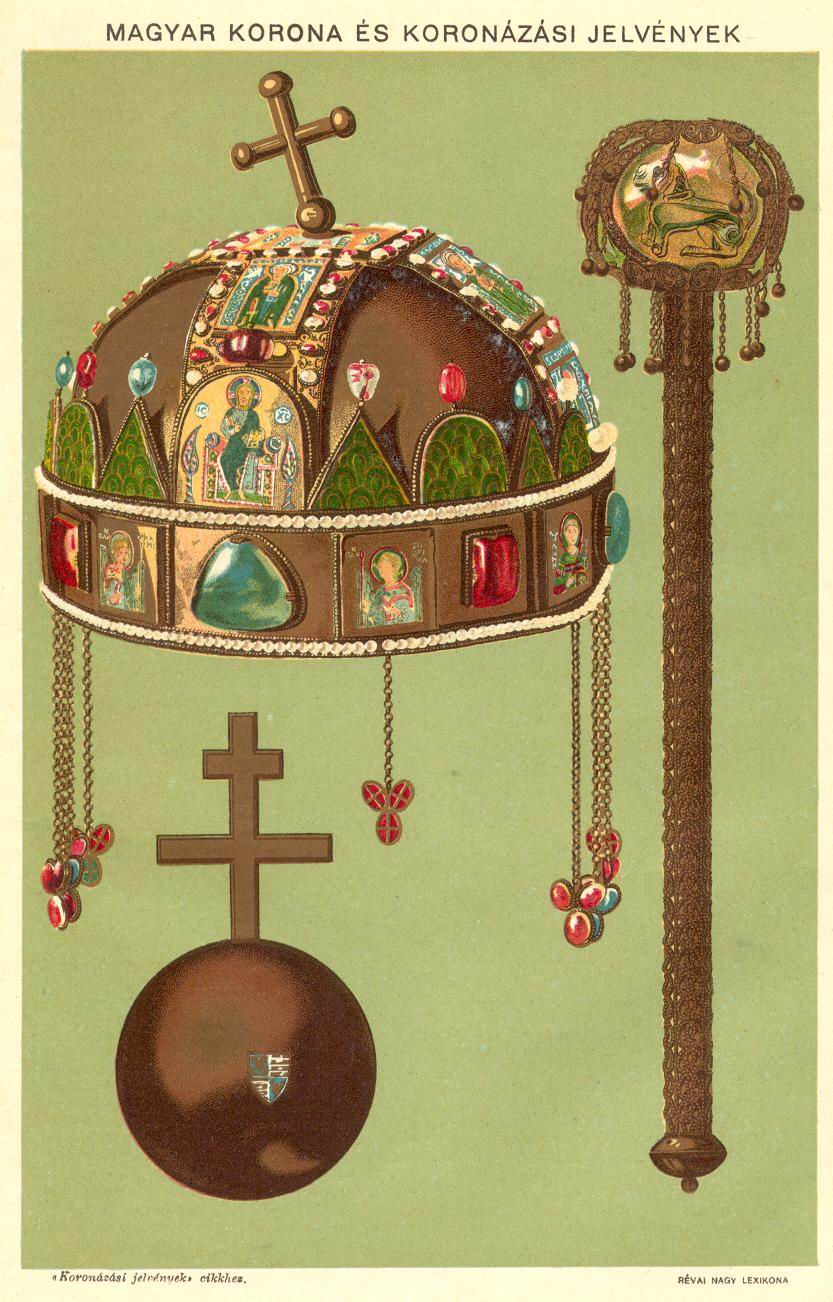
Holy Crown, Imperial Orb and Scepter

The Hungarian Crown Jewels were the regalia of the Apostolic Monarch of Hungary throughout the kingdom's more than 900-year history and are partly of early medieval origin.

== Description ==
The crown jewels include:

- The Holy Crown, also known as the St. Stephen's Crown. It is the most famous part of the Hungarian Crown Jewels and is considered a symbol of Hungarian imperial unity. The original crown was sent in the year 1000 by Pope Sylvester II to King Stephen I of Hungary, who had recently converted to Christianity, for his coronation, but was probably lost around 1074. The current crown was then made in two phases between the 11th and 13th centuries. From 1267 onwards , the Hungarian monarch took his oath of allegiance on this crown. The last to be crowned with it was King Charles IV (Hungarian: IV Károly; also Charles I of Austria) in 1916. In Hungary's turbulent history, the crown was stolen several times, kept safe from enemies, or buried, which also explains why the crown is somewhat damaged and the cross is crooked. In 1945 the crown came to the United States and was not returned to Hungary until 1978 by Jimmy Carter. Since 2000, it has been kept, along with the orb and sceptre, in the dome of the Hungarian Parliament building in Budapest. It is included in the coat of arms of Hungary.
- The Imperial Orb. It consists of gilded metal plates and a double cross (Patriarchal Cross). Based on the coat of arms depicted on it, its origin can be dated to the beginning of the 14th century, more precisely to the reign of King Charles I (I. Károly) or Louis I (I. Lajos).
- The royal scepter. With its distinctive shape, it is one of the oldest of its kind and arguably the most valuable piece of the Hungarian Crown Jewels. It dates from the 11th century and consists of a thin, gilded silver handle with a 7 cm diameter crystal ball mounted on it, with motifs inlaid on three sides.
- The Coronation Sword. Although it is attributed to King Stephen I, it probably comes from Northern Italy and was made in the 15th century. The sword is 89 cm long, its blade 6.5 cm wide. The original sword of Stephen I came to Bohemia after the death of King Béla IV, where it has been part of the inventory of St. Vitus Cathedral in Prague since 1387.
- The coronation mantle. It was originally a liturgical vestment and is made of rosette-shaped Byzantine silk. According to an inscription, it was made for King Stephen I and his wife Gisela of Bavaria, who donated the mantle to the Basilica of Székesfehérvár in 1031.

== Gallery ==
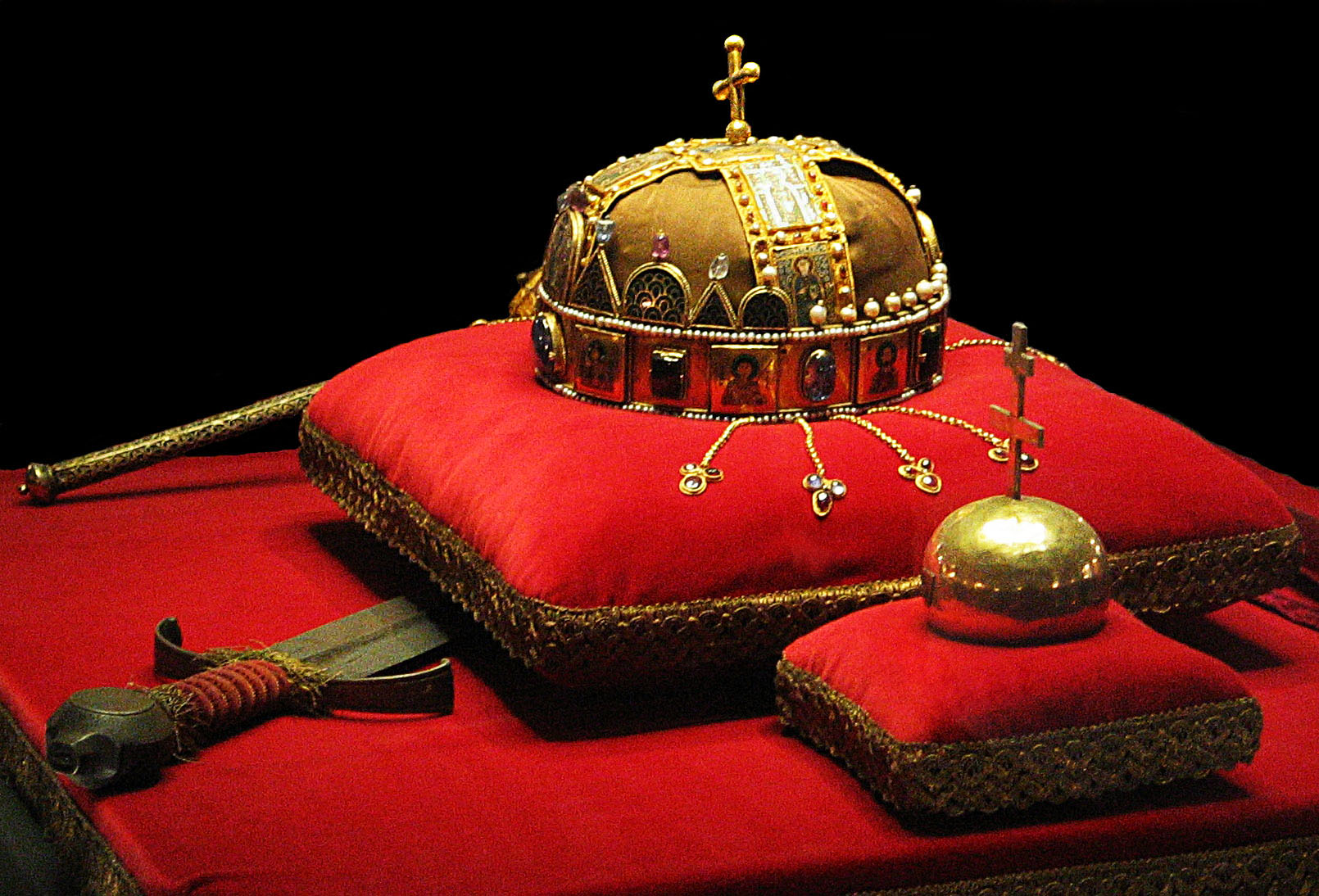
Crown, orb, sword and scepter in the Hungarian Parliament building in Budapest

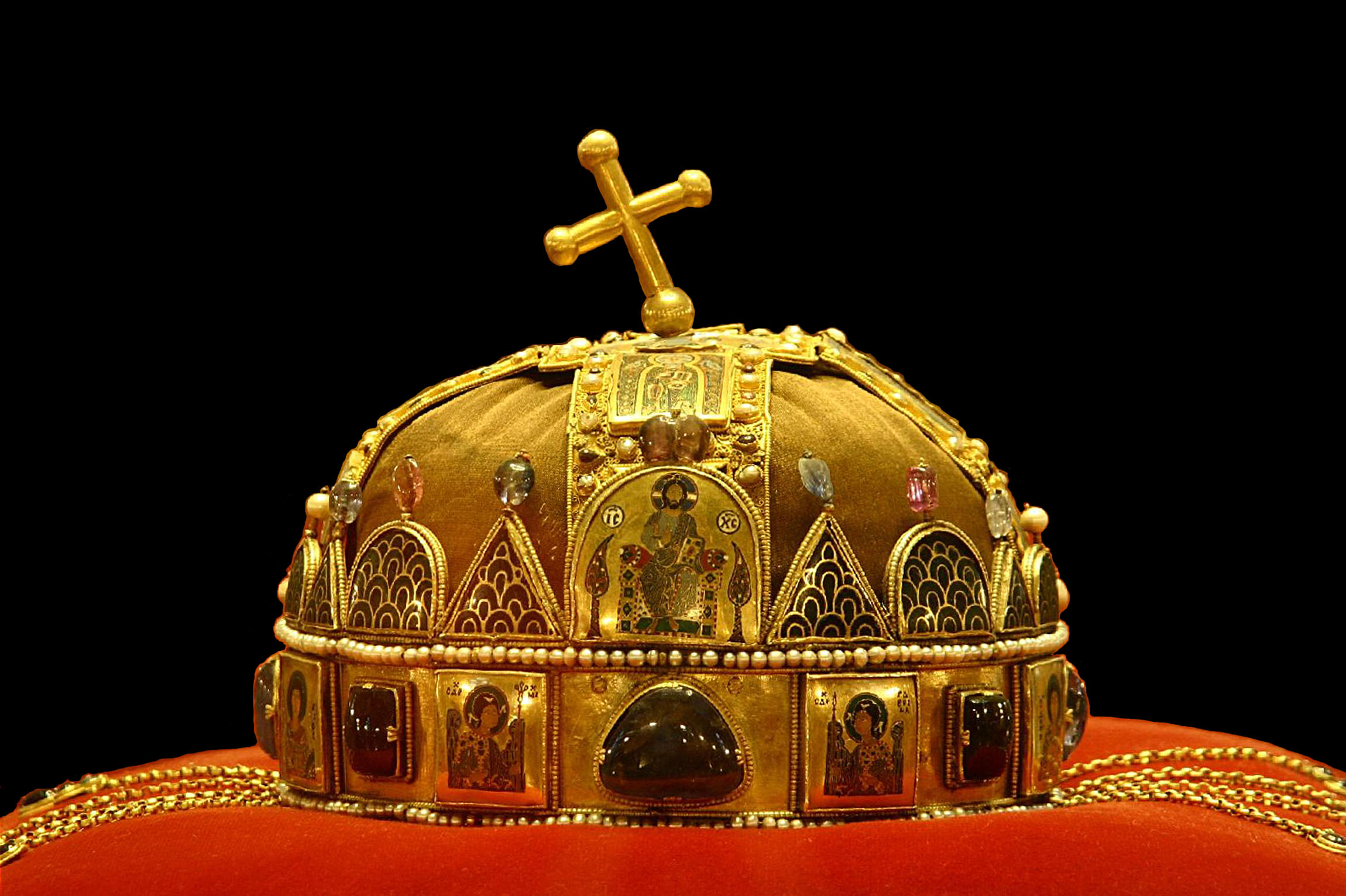
The Holy Crown

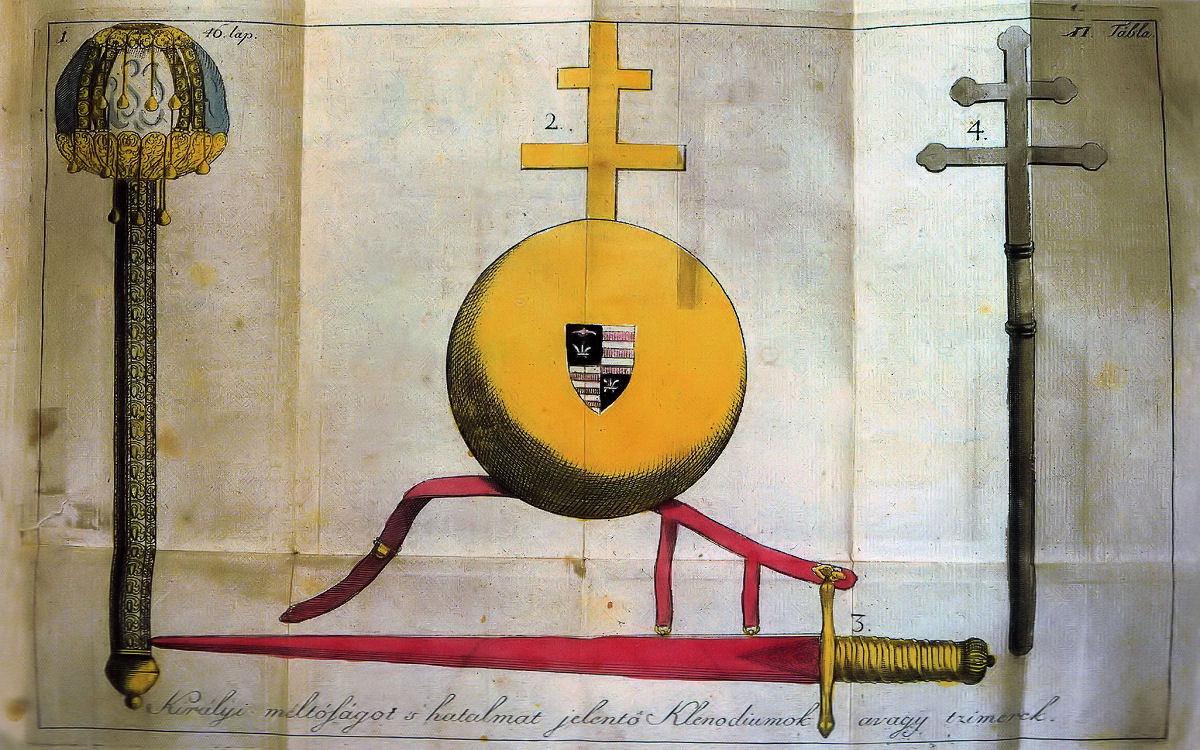
Imperial orb and scepter (drawing by Sámuel Decsy 1792)

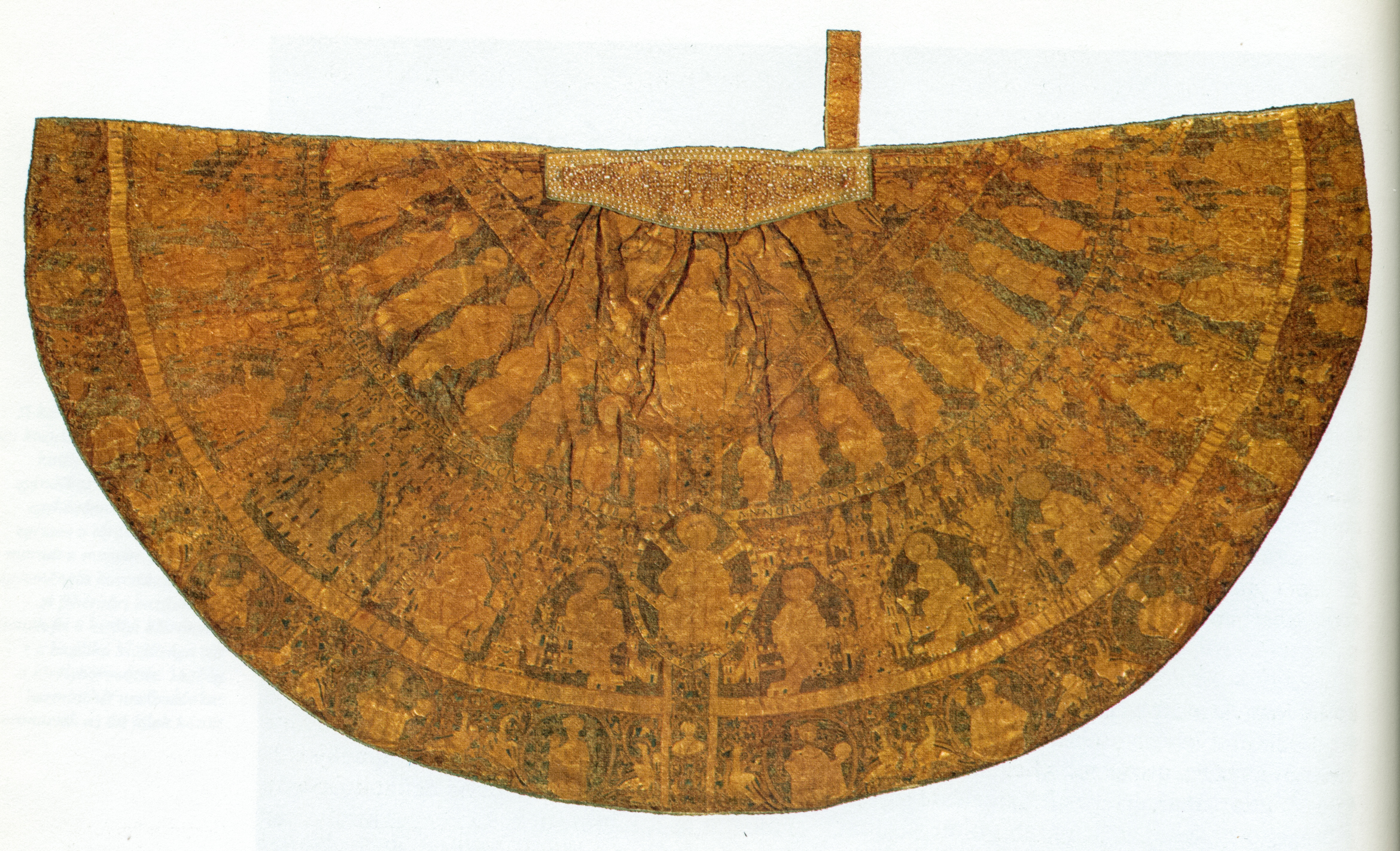
The coronation mantle is exhibited in the Hungarian National Museum

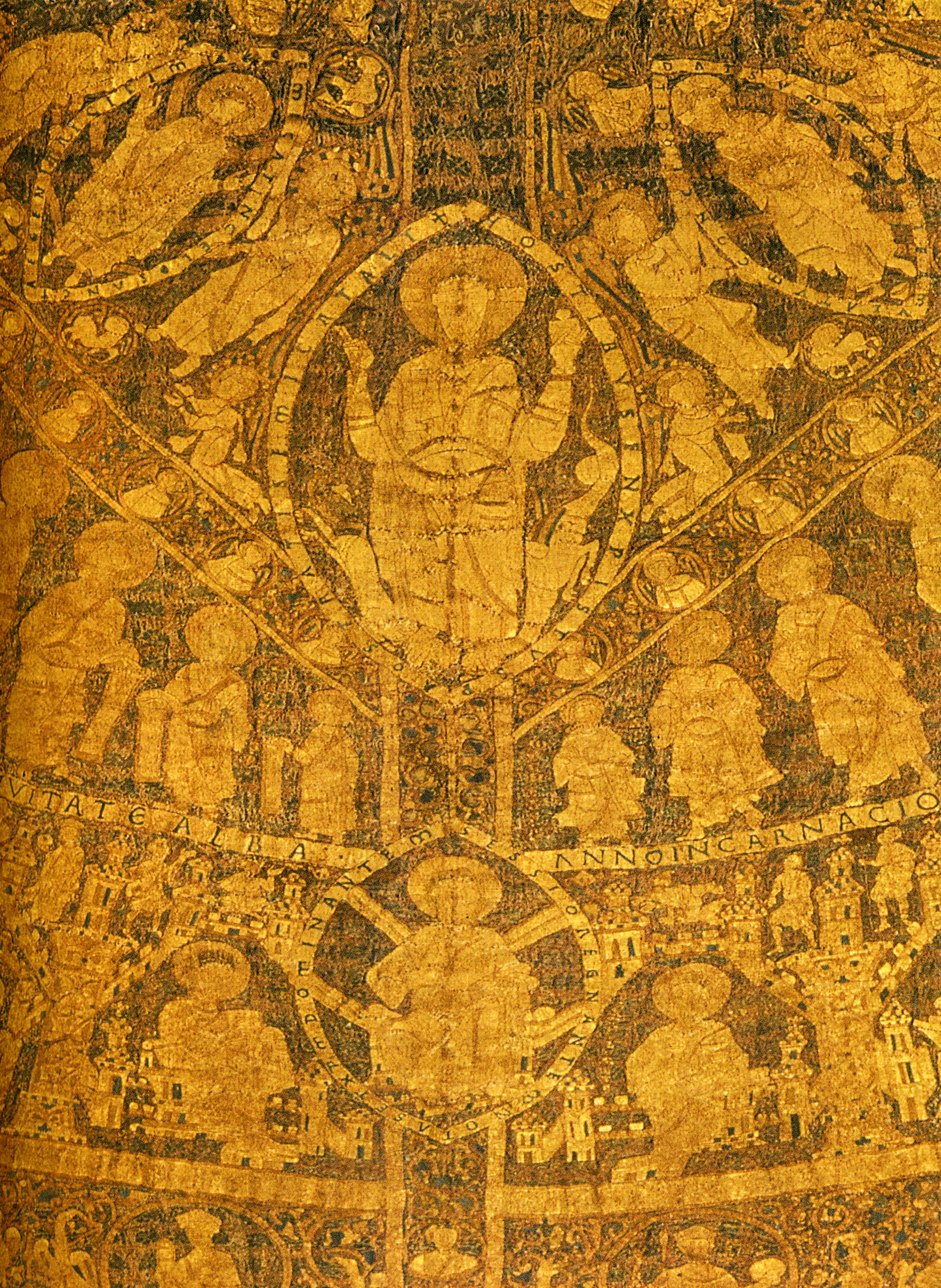
Coronation mantle (detail)
