= Sozomeno da Pistoia =

Italian humanist (1387–1458)

- Born: 1387; Pistoia, Tuscany, Italy
- Died: 1458 (aged 70–71); Pistoia, Tuscany, Italy
- Occupations: Teacher; priest; canon lawyer
- Movement: Humanism

Zomino da Pistoia (1387 – 1458), often referred to by the Hellenized version of his name, Sozomeno, was an Italian teacher, priest, and early humanist. Born in Pistoia, he was educated there before receiving a scholarship, which he used to study canon law in Padua and Florence. He learned Greek through self-education and occasional lessons from the scholar Guarino da Verona, thereafter preferring the Hellenized version of his name, Sozomeno. Then, he made a career out of teaching grammar, rhetoric, and poetry; he served also as a priest and canon lawyer. He taught both in his hometown and in Florence, where he was the Florentine Studio's master of rhetoric and poetry. Generally, he worked as a private tutor; among his pupils were the sons of his fellow humanists Palla Strozzi, Matteo Palmieri, and Leonardo Dati.

Sozomeno was an early humanist and wrote numerous commentaries on classical Latin works such as those by Ovid, Cicero, Seneca, Juvenal, and Horace. One of the first scribes to use humanist minuscule, he made copies of a number of classical and humanist works. In addition, he began but had never finished a historical text entitled Chronicon universale. He was an attendee of the Council of Constance.

During his life, Sozomeno amassed a large collection of manuscripts and copies of ancient texts, with his library containing 110 works by 1460. Before his death in 1458, he bequeathed his collection to the city of Pistoia, where he spent the final 25 or so years of his life, with the intent that the works would be made available to the public. According to the Italian literature professor Anna Pegoretti, this was "the very first trace of a public library in Italy". In 2008, a research project aiming to locate Sozomeno's collection was launched; by 2017, researchers had found 83 of his works dispersed across Europe.
