= Kralj =

Kralj is a South Slavic surname and title. It literally means "king" and, according to Petar Skok, is derived from Charles the Great (Karolus) in the same sense as Tsar is to Caesar.

In Slovenia, it is the 14th most common surname: it is present throughout the country, but it is especially common in central and southern Slovenia. In Croatia, it is the 49th most common surname, also present throughout the country, but most numerous in central Croatia. It is one of the most common surnames in two counties of Croatia.

It is also present in Serbia, e.g. the well known actor Petar Kralj, a name which during the Communist rule in Serbia caused stir when read according to the Austrian-Hungarian bureaucratic manner—inherited throughout Central Europe—of listing surnames before personal names in schools, the army, hospitals etc. because it sounds like King Peter of Yugoslavia.

As a surname, it may refer to:

- Darko Kralj (Croatian Paralympic athlete)
- Elvira Kralj (Slovenian actress)
- Goran Kralj (American singer and songwriter)
- Ivica Kralj (Serbian footballer)
- Ladislav Kralj-Međimurec (Croatian painter and engraver)
- Petar Kralj (Serbian actor)
- Tone Kralj (Slovenian painter)
