= Life of Saint Stephen, King of Hungary =

King Saint Stephen

The longer version of the Life of Saint Stephen, King of Hungary (Latin: Legenda maior S. Stephani regis) is one of the three hagiographies of Saint Stephen, who was crowned the first King of Hungary in 1000 or 1001. It was written between 1077 and 1083, before King Stephen I's canonization.

== King Saint Stephen ==
Stephen was born in the late 960s or in the 970s. He was the only son of Géza, Grand Prince of the Hungarians, and his wife, Sarolt. His original (pagan) name was Vajk, but he was still a child when he was baptized.

He was canonized in Székesfehérvár on 20 August 1083.

== Manuscripts and editions ==
Four manuscripts preserved the text. However, the text of the legend is unfinished because its four original copies break off at the same point. The same manuscripts also contain the shorter version of King Saint Stephen's Life.

== Sources ==
The legend explicitly refers to King Stephen's laws in the ninth chapter, proving that its author knew the king's decrees. In chapter 15, the author of the legend also mentioned and quoted the Admonitions that he attributed to the saintly king. The writer also knew the Lives of the Holy Hermits Zoerard the Confessor and Benedict the Martyr which was written around 1064 by Maurus, Bishop of Pécs.

== Text ==
The legend was written before King Saint Stephen's canonization.

== Sources ==
- Kristó, Gyula (1994). "I. (Szent) István [(Saint) Stephen I]". In Kristó, Gyula; Engel, Pál; Makk, Ferenc (eds.). Korai magyar történeti lexikon (9–14. század) [Encyclopedia of the Early Hungarian History (9th–14th centuries)] (in Hungarian). Akadémiai Kiadó. pp. 291–292. ISBN 963-05-6722-9.
- Macartney, C. A. (1953). The Medieval Hungarian Historians: A Critical & Analytical Guide. Cambridge University Press. ISBN 978-0-521-08051-4.
- Pražák, Richard (1985). "The Legends of King Stephens". Hungarian Studies. 1 (2). Akadémiai Kiadó: 163–178.
