= List of Hungarian chronicles =

This is a list of Hungarian chronicles and related gestas and legends which treat early and medieval Hungarian history. The original source of all extant Hungarian chronicles was the lost Gesta Ungarorum, which was written in the 11th century.

The 14th-century Hungarian chronicle composition, which itself was produced by the compilation of several older gestas and chronicles made at different times, It narrates history from biblical times.

The manuscripts were compared to the Buda Chronicle and the Illuminated Chronicle from the perspective of the kinship of texts; thus, a group of other Hungarian chronicles were named after the Buda Chronicle: the so-called Buda Chronicle family. And another group of other Hungarian chronicles were named after the Illuminated Chronicle: the so-called Illuminated Chronicle family, which preserved more extensive passages of text with several interpolations. The 14th-century Acephalus Codex, the 15th-century Sambucus Codex, the Vatican Codex, and the aforementioned Dubnic Chronicle made in 1479 belong to the Buda Chronicle family.

== List of Hungarian chronicles ==
Date	Image	Name	Author	Language	Description
11th century		Ancient Gesta			The earliest Hungarian chronicle, its text was expanded and rewritten several times in the 12th–14th centuries.
1080		Greater Legend of Saint Stephen		Latin	
1083		Lesser Legend of Saint Stephen		Latin	
11th century		Life of King Stephen of Hungary by Hartvik	Bishop Hartvik	Latin	
1100s		Gesta Ladislai regis		Latin	
1200s		Gesta Hungarorum; Latin for "The Deeds of the Hungarians"	Anonymus	Latin	The principal subject of the chronicle is the Hungarian conquest of the Carpathian Basin at the end of the 9th century, and it writes of the origin of the Hungarians, identifying the Hungarians' ancestors with the ancient Scythians and Huns.
1203		Annales Posonienses; Latin for "Annals of Pozsony"			Early medieval annals written in the Kingdom of Hungary. The annals contain short records of events occurring between 997 and 1203.
1220s–1230s		Hungarian–Polish Chronicle original title Cronica Ungarorum juncta et mixta cum cronicis Polonorum, et vita sancti Stephani; Latin for "Chronicle of the Hungarians Attached to and Mixed with Chronicles of the Poles, and the Life of Saint Stephen"		Latin	
Around 1243–1244		Carmen miserabile original title Carmen miserabile super destructione regni Hungariae per Tartaros; Latin for "Sad Song for the Destruction of the Kingdom of Hungary by the Tartars"	Master Roger	Latin	It was preserved in an appendix of the 15th-century Thuróczy Chronicle.
Around 1271		Gesta Stephani V	Magister Ákos		
Around 1282–1285		Gesta Hunnorum et Hungarorum; Latin for "Deeds of the Huns and Hungarians"	Simon of Kéza	Latin	
1333–1334		Minorite Chronicle of Buda		Latin	
14th century		14th-century Hungarian chronicle composition			
1330		Anjou Legendarium		Latin	The medieval legendarium of more than 140 pages contains images and scenes of the life of Jesus, Hungarian bishop Saint Gerard, Prince Saint Emeric of Hungary, King Saint Ladislaus I of Hungary, and of many other legendary Christians.
1334		Zágráb Chronicle			
1352–1353		Mügeln Chronicle	Heinrich von Mügeln	German	
1350s–1360s		Acephalus Codex (Buda Chronicle family)		Latin	
1358		Illuminated Chronicle (Illuminated Chronicle family)	Mark of Kalt	Latin	A medieval illustrated chronicle from the Kingdom of Hungary. It represents the artistic style of the royal court of King Louis I of Hungary. The 147 pictures of the chronicle represent a large source of information on medieval Hungarian history.
1361		Chronicon Rithmicum	Heinrich von Mügeln		
1374		Várad Chronicle			
14th century		Long Life of Saint Gerard			
14th century		Chronicon de Ludovico rege	John of Küküllő	Latin	
14th century		Anonymus Minorita Chronica		Latin	
14th century		Munich Chronicle			
14th century		Kaprina Codex			
1431		Csepreg Codex (Illuminated Chronicle family)			
1460		Drági compendium			
1462		Teleki Codex (Illuminated Chronicle family)		Latin, Hungarian	
1473		Buda Chronicle original title Chronica Hungarorum; Latin for "Chronicle of the Hungarians"	András Hess	Latin	The first book ever printed in Hungary. This book is the first example, that the printing history of a country begin with the publication of the history of a people.
1473		Béldi Codex (Illuminated Chronicle family)		Latin	
1479		Dubnic Chronicle original title Chronica de gestis Hungarorum; Latin for "Chronicle of the Deeds of the Hungarians" (Buda Chronicle family)			
15th century		Knauz Chronicle			
15th century		Szepesszombat Chronicle		German	
		Chronicon Posoniense			
15th century		Vatican Codex		Latin	
15th century		Sambucus Codex (Buda Chronicle family)		Latin	
1488		Thuróczy Chronicle original title Chronica Hungarorum; Latin for "Chronicle of the Hungarians" (Illuminated Chronicle family)	Johannes Thuróczy	Latin	The chronicle describes the history of Hungarians from the earliest times to 1487. The chronicle contains hand-colored woodcuts depicting 41 Hungarian kings and leaders. The Augsburg edition of the chronicle is the first known print made with gold paint.
1490		Epitome rerum Hungaricarum; Latin for "A Brief Summary of the History of the Hungarians"	Pietro Ranzano	Latin	The chronicle is the first Hungarian historical work with a humanist spirit.
1497		Rerum Hungaricarum decades Latin for "Decades of Hungarian History"	Antonio Bonfini	Latin	Until the late 18th century, this work served as a primary source for Hungarian history in European academic circles.
1510		Legend of Saint Margaret		Hungarian	
1527		Érdy Codex		Hungarian	The codex is the largest collection of Hungarian legends, and greatest volume of Hungarian language in history.
1534		Der Hungern Chronica original title Der Hungern Chronica, inhaltend wie sie anfengklich ins Land kommen sind, mit Anzeygung aller irer König, vnd was sie namhafftigs gethon haben. Angefangen von irem ersten König Athila, vn[d] volfüret biss auff König Ludwig, so im 1526. Jar bey Mohatz vom Türcken vmbekommen ist Old German for "The Chronicle of the Hungarians, Which Includes the History of Their Conquest, Presents All Their Kings and What Remarkable Things They Accomplished. From Their First King, Attila, to King Louis, Who Met His Death at Mohács in 1526 by the Turks"	Hans Hauge zum Freistein	German	
1543/1566		Tarih-i Üngürüs Ottoman Turkish for "The History of the Hungarians"	Mahmud Tercüman	Ottoman Turkish	Mahmud Tercüman translated it from a Hungarian chronicle found after the Siege of Székesfehérvár in 1543.
1559		Székely Chronicle original title Chronica ez vilagnak jeles dolgairol Hungarian for "Chronicle About the Famous Events of the World"	István Székely	Hungarian	
1575		Heltai Chronicle original title Chronica az magyaroknac dolgairol: mint iöttek ki a nagy Scythiábol Pannoniaban, Es mint foglaltac magoknac az orſzagot: Es mint birtác aßt Herczegröl Herczegre: Es Kiralyrol Kiralyra, nagy ſok tuſakodaſockal es ſzamtalan ſoc viadallyockal Old Hungarian for "Chronicle About the Deeds of the Hungarians: How They Came Out From Scythia to Pannonia, and How They Conquered the Country for Themselves: And How They Ruled It From for Prince to Prince, and From King to King, With Many Great Battles and Numerous Fights"	Gáspár Heltai	Hungarian	
1664		Nádasdy Mausoleum original title Mausoleum potentissimorum ac gloriosissimorum Regni Apostolici Regum et primorum militantis Ungariae Ducum; Latin for "The Mausoleum of the Most Powerful and Glorious Apostolic Kingdom and the Kings and Military Leaders of Hungary"	Count Ferenc Nádasdy	Latin, German	The chronicle contains 60 full-page images of Hungarian kings and leaders.
1740		Macar Tarihi Ottoman Turkish for "Hungarian History"		Ottoman Turkish	
