= Tarih-i Üngürüs =

16th-century historical chronicle about the history of Hungary

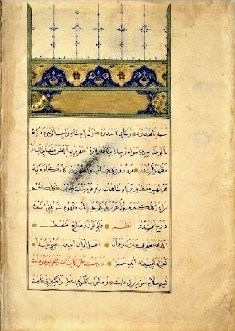
- Front page of the Tarih-i Üngürüs
- Author: Mahmud Tercüman
- Language: Ottoman Turkish
- Subjects: History of the Hungarians
- Genre: Chronicle
- Published: 1543/1566
- Publication place: Ottoman Empire
- Media type: Manuscript
- Pages: 210

The Tarih-i Üngürüs (Ottoman Turkish: تاريخ انكروس, romanized: Târîḫ-i Üngürûs, lit. 'The History of the Hungarians') is a 16th-century Ottoman Turkish chronicle treating the history of the Hungarians. Its author Mahmud Tercüman translated it from a Latin chronicle found after the siege of Székesfehérvár in 1543. According to the scientific point of view, this work was a late 15th-century chronicle, Johannes de Thurocz's Chronica Hungarorum. Since it provides different information on Hungarian prehistory compared to the Hungarian chronicles on several points, there is also a fringe theory according to which the author found and translated the lost Urgesta or "ancient gesta", the earliest chronicle of the Hungarians.

== Manuscript ==
Hungarian Turkologist and orientalist Ármin Vámbéry discovered the manuscript during one of his journeys to the Ottoman Empire and brought it to Hungary in the 1850s. Vámbéry donated the manuscript to the library of the Hungarian Academy of Sciences (MTA) in 1860, where the 210-page document received the pressmark Török F. 57 and is kept in the library's oriental collection.

The codex, definitely an autograph, was written in sülüs script, a classical style of the Turkish calligraphy. Its title was recorded in later handwriting in the front page. The manuscript also contains a subtitle İskendernâme ('Book of Alexander the Great'). Both title entries bear witness to European-style ductus and can perhaps be attributed to Vámbéry. There is a sign that someone tried to remove the subtitle by scratching it out. According to a note under the titles, the manuscript was once possessed by a certain Muhammed Amin Abu l'Is'ad Tusturzade. Another note records that the codex became a property of Vámbéry in the mid-19th century.

After the study of German–Hungarian linguist Josef Budenz in 1861, for almost a century the Tarih-i Üngürüs fell out of the focus of historiography. Emma Léderer referred to Budenz's study in 1952, drawing attention to the unpublished and unedited chronicle. In the next decades, from 1961, György Hazai published some philological studies on the subject with the intention of a future full translation and annotation of Mahmud's work. Meanwhile, the researches of Josef Matuz (1975) and Ernst Dieter Petritsch (1985) clarified the career arc of Mahmud Tercüman. In the 1980s, István Borzsák determined the work's connection with the Alexander the Great tradition.

Representatives of the non-mainstream alternate historiography claimed that the Hungarian Academy of Sciences (MTA) deliberately prevented the manuscript from being researchable and processable over the decades. Emigrant activist Gyula Geönczeöl claimed that he heard about the Tarih-i Üngürüs first from Roman Catholic priest András Zakar in 1971. Zakar acquired the manuscript and sent to Turkologist József Blaskovics, who lived in Prague. According to Geönczeöl, orientalist Lajos Ligeti, then a vice president of MTA, tried to dissuade him from publishing the manuscript. Although the manuscript was translated by Blaskovics and published by Magvető in 1982, but Endre K. Grandpierre claimed this was done in a deliberately small number of copies, moreover, the original text was falsified or shortened at several points. In emigration, Geönczeöl also published the text in 1988 in Cleveland and in 1996. György Hazai worked for decades on the critical edition, which was published in 1996 and then in 2009. He explained the long work with his multifaceted busyness.

== Author ==
Mahmud Tercüman ("Mahmud the Interpreter") was a court official of Suleiman the Magnificent. Austrian historian Ernst Dietrich Petritsch discovered that Mahmud was born as Sebold von Pibrach in 1510 as the son of Jakob von Pibrach, a Jewish merchant in Vienna. Hungarian–German historian Josef Matuz argued that he was of Bavarian origin and served as a page in the Hungarian royal court. He was taken prisoner of war in the Battle of Mohács in 1526. His talent and language skills (Latin, German, Turkish) allowed him to rise in society of the Ottoman Empire (he bore the honorific titles agha then bey). In the following decades, he stood out for his diplomatic services in the court of Suleiman. His native language was German (Vámbéry still claimed that Mahmud was of Hungarian ethnicity). Mahmud kept his Austrian and German connections. For instance, he ordered books from Vienna in 1573, including the Theatrum Orbis Terrarum.

Mahmud was a skilled diplomat since 1541. He was employed as an interpreter at least since 1550. He served as chief interpreter of the Sublime Porte from 1573 until his death. He performed diplomatic missions in the same period: he delivered a firman of the Sultan to the Transylvanian Saxons in 1550, to call them to obedience to John Sigismund Zápolya. He led Ottoman legations to Poland (1553), Hungary (1554), France (1559) and Venice (1570). During the Ottoman–Venetian War over Cyprus, he was arrested and imprisoned in Verona. He was freed after the peace concluded in March 1573. He returned to Istanbul in July 1573. He was sent to Vienna in December 1574 in order to extend the peace with the Habsburg Empire by eight years. Mahmud Tercüman died on 3 April 1575 in Prague, during a diplomatic mission. His body was transferred to Esztergom thereafter.

== Sources ==
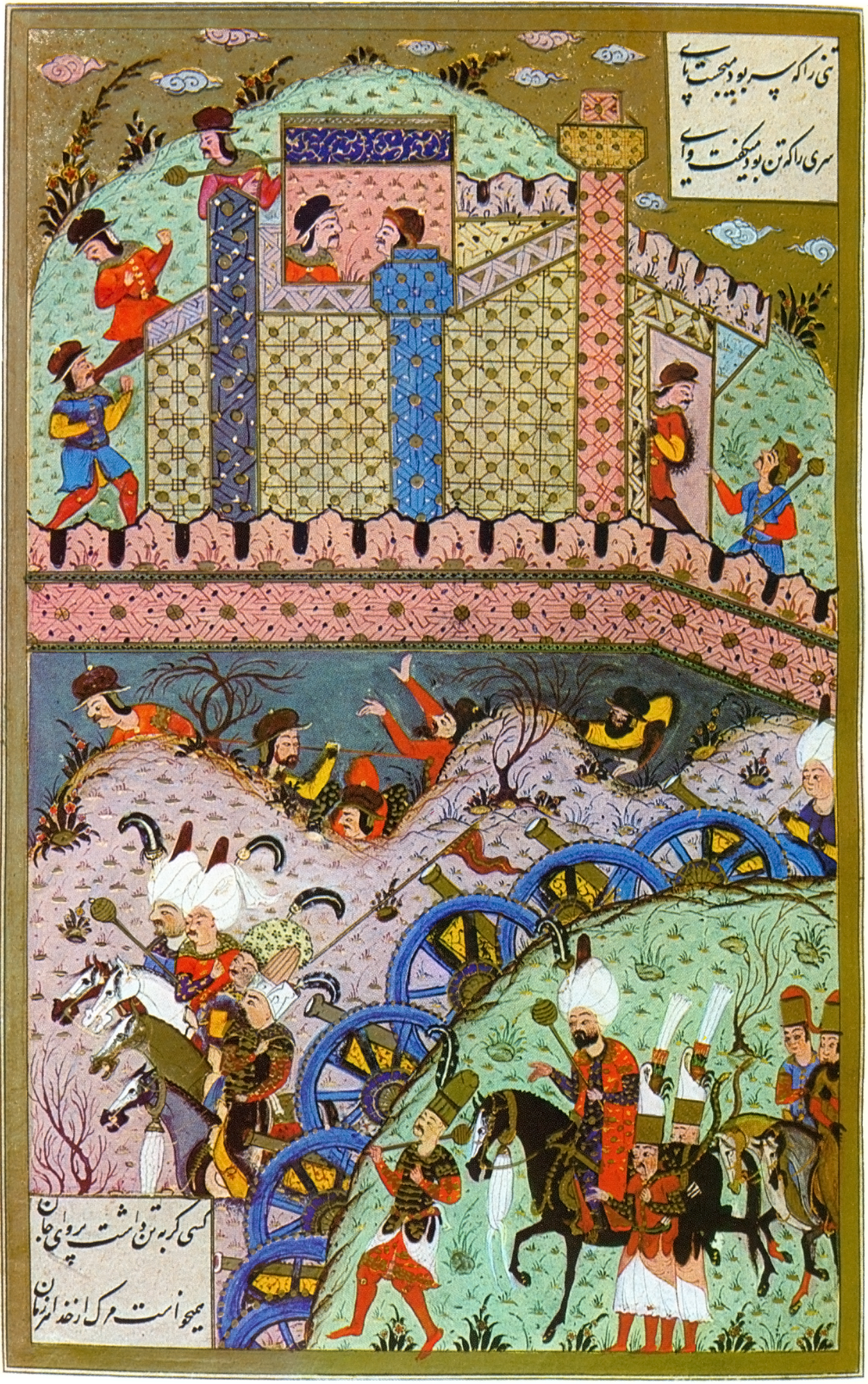
Suleiman arriving at the siege of Székesfehérvár in 1543, depicted by an Ottoman miniature (Topkapı Palace)

In the first pages of his chronicle, Mahmud narrates that during the 1543 Ottoman campaign, Székesfehérvár ("Ustulni Belġırad") was captured among other important Hungarian cities, where a Latin-language book was found, which told the history of Hungary ("Üngürüs province") since the beginnings. The chronicle listed the Hungarian kings, their fights, reign and successions, in addition to the name history of Buda ("Budin"). Therefore, Mahmud Tercüman decided to translate the book and recommended it to the attention of Suleiman. Consequently, Mahmud wrote his chronicle sometime between 1543 and 1566 (Suleiman's death), most likely in the 1550s or early 1560s.

Several doubts have arisen regarding the authenticity of Mahmud's narration. Josef Budenz was the first scholar, who analyzed the text in 1861. He considered the chronicle as a "precious literary memory", whose historical value, however, is doubtful. According to him, Mahmud made many mistakes during his translation, misunderstood expressions and parts of the text. Budenz claimed that Mahmud's Latin book, the main source, was a "lousy historical work". Budenz expressed doubt about the single source, since the story of Alexander the Great has no tradition in the Hungarian chronicle literature. István Borzsák identified this source with the world chronicle of Justin. According to József Blaskovics, the author may actually have utilized several works. He definitely utilized Western sources for the chapter of Alexander the Great. In many cases Mahmud talks about the sources he uses in the singular and then in the plural. One of the sources was presumably an old chronicle, which contains several legends of the Hungarian prehistory (for instance, Hunor and Magor). Since the history of the 10th century (between Árpád and Stephen I) is completely missing from the Tarih-i Üngürüs, Blaskovics considered here the narration of the end of the original chronicle, and the subsequent events already belong to another source. Blaskovics argued that Mahmud's work is not a mere translation, but a fictional treatment of a compilation of historical texts. Blaskovics defined the genre of the chronicle as halk destanları (a kind of folk epic), which are basically written in prose with numerous verses, which Mahmud himself spent on the model of vernacular folk songs. The genre is characterized by the appearance of an outstanding wise man in different parts of the text, which can also be found in the Tarih-i Üngürüs (the wise man gives advices to Hunor and Magor, Saint Stephen and even Alexander the Great).

Turkologist György Hazai stated that the chronicle's language is a typical example of the Middle Ottoman Turkish period. Hazai argued that the style of the text allowed the conclusion that the manuscript was written by two people, consequently Mahmud's work was assisted by a scribe. Regarding the Hungarian history, the Tarih-i Üngürüs follows the sequence of events in accordance with the Illuminated Chronicle (Note: The Illuminated Chronicle contains two Hungarian and a Latin marginal notes in Arabic writing in three places, after they were written down by an Ottoman reader. The Hungarian note in the front page ("Turóds János krónikája") refers to the Chronica Hungarorum as a reminder for himself. Some scholars, e.g. Ferenc Zsinka and Kornél Szovák, identified this person with Mahmud Tercüman. Others, e.g. Pál Ács considered another Ottoman interpreter Balázs Somlyai (or Murad) as the writer of notes.) and Johannes de Thurocz's Chronica Hungarorum. It is plausible that Mahmud Tercüman used the latter book. The posopographic data of the Hungarian kings shows a high degree of correspondence between the Tarih-i Üngürüs and the Chronica Hungarorum. From the reign of Louis I of Hungary, the Tarih-i Üngürüs becomes very concise. Hazai considered that the author had to approach the issue of Ottoman–Hungarian wars with caution, thus he used a high degree of compression and omission. László Veszprémy emphasized that Mahmud took over the Carmen miserabile (an account of the 1241 Mongol invasion of Hungary) in its entirety, which confirms that the author utilized the Chronica Hungarorum, since the text of the Carmen miserabile was preserved by this aforementioned chronicle. However, Mahmud supplemented his information with other sources too, including the Gesta Hungarorum by Anonymus regarding the Hungarian conquest of the Carpathian Basin.

== Motivations ==
According to Mahmud's own words, he translated the Latin chronicle because he intended to properly inform his ruler Suleiman, who was constantly at war in Hungary, about the origin and history of the Hungarians. In addition, he hoped for the sultan's reward for his efforts. György Hazai argued that Mahmud's work was a compilation of multi-threaded chronicles that served a specific political-ideological goal, namely the propagation of Suleiman's western conquests. Mahmud presented Alexander the Great and Attila as examples of the greatest conquerors comparing them to Suleiman. István Borzsák argued that the chronicler tried to emphasize that Suleiman is clearly the rightful heir to the power of Alexander the Great and, due to historical continuity, legally owns the territories of the former Eastern Roman Empire (then Byzantium). The presentation of Attila's campaigns also marks the claim of the Ottoman Empire to the entire Mediterranean Sea and the Italian Peninsula. Therefore, Hazai argued that Mahmud compiled his work in the 1540s, after Suleiman made unsuccessful attempts to capture Vienna.

Balázs Sudár analyzed the Ottoman intellectual occupation of Hungary in order to show how the acquisition of territories went hand in hand with the acquisition of the past by rewriting it. Among others, the Tarih-i Üngürüs also served this purpose. Mahmud's chronicle presents the fictional elements and anecdotes of the life of Alexander the Great, who, accordingly, marched into Pannonia and thus the Ottoman rightfully possesses Hungary too.

== The Urgesta theory ==
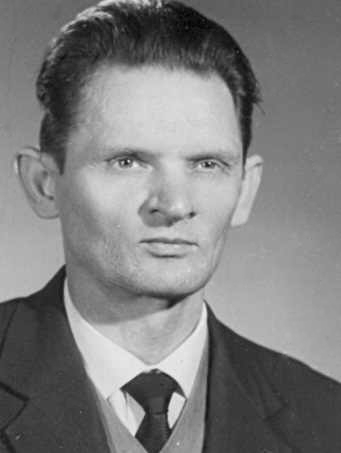
Endre K. Grandpierre (1916–2003)

Hungarian essayist Endre K. Grandpierre first published an article about the Tarih-i Üngürüs as a new historical source for the Hungarian prehistory previously thought to be lost in 1979, comparing the different variations of the Hunor and Magor legend. Grandpierre claimed that Mahmud found the lost original ancient gesta or Urgesta of the Hungarians. He argued that the Tarih-i Üngürüs extended the stay of the Hungarian people in the Pannonian Basin until biblical times (the Genesis flood), thus the Hungarians are the only descendants of the Scythians. Examining the chronicle text, Grandpierre drafted altogether eight Hungarian (=Scythian, later Hun) conquests ("returns") of the Carpathian Basin over thousands of years. He claimed that the original Urgesta was initially a compilation of traditional Hungarian folk (regös) songs and Mahmud's translation preserved the contours of this national heroic epic lasted from the legendary Nimrod throughout the history of the Huns until Árpád's (re-)conquest of the Carpathian Basin, proving the identification between the Huns and the Hungarians (in this context, the Huns also ceconquested their homeland in 375). Grandpierre claimed that the original Urgesta was written in Old Hungarian script long time before the Christianization of Hungary. Grandpierre argued it was compiled around 907, because Mahmus's work completely missed the 10th century. This Urgesta was translated into Latin and continued sometime in the 11th century, after the reign of Stephen I.

Tamás Hölbling considered that Mahmud Tercüman did not utilize the Gesta Hungarorum, since his chronicle is much more detailed about the series of events of the Hungarian conquest of the Carpathian Basin, but omitted some relevant chapters from Anonymus' work (e.g. the Turul legend and various etymologies). Hölbling considered that Mahmud could have used the same ancient chronicle from which Anonymus drew. Hölbling argued that the Tarih-i Üngürüs, beside the Gesta Hungarorum, is the only chronicle which refers to the blood oath, but in completely different context. Regarding the details of the 890s conquest, Hölbling claimed that Mahmud's work contains very old written traditions, and by no means can it be a copy of the later chronicles. In addition, Hölbling argued about the details of the sequence of events of the "Hunnic reconquest", which is much more abundant than in the other chronicles. Thus, the historian argued (agreeing with Sándor Domanovszky's opinion) that Simon of Kéza only extracted this part in his own work and was not its creator. The history of Buda is also presented in a much more detailed and logical manner.

=== Criticism ===
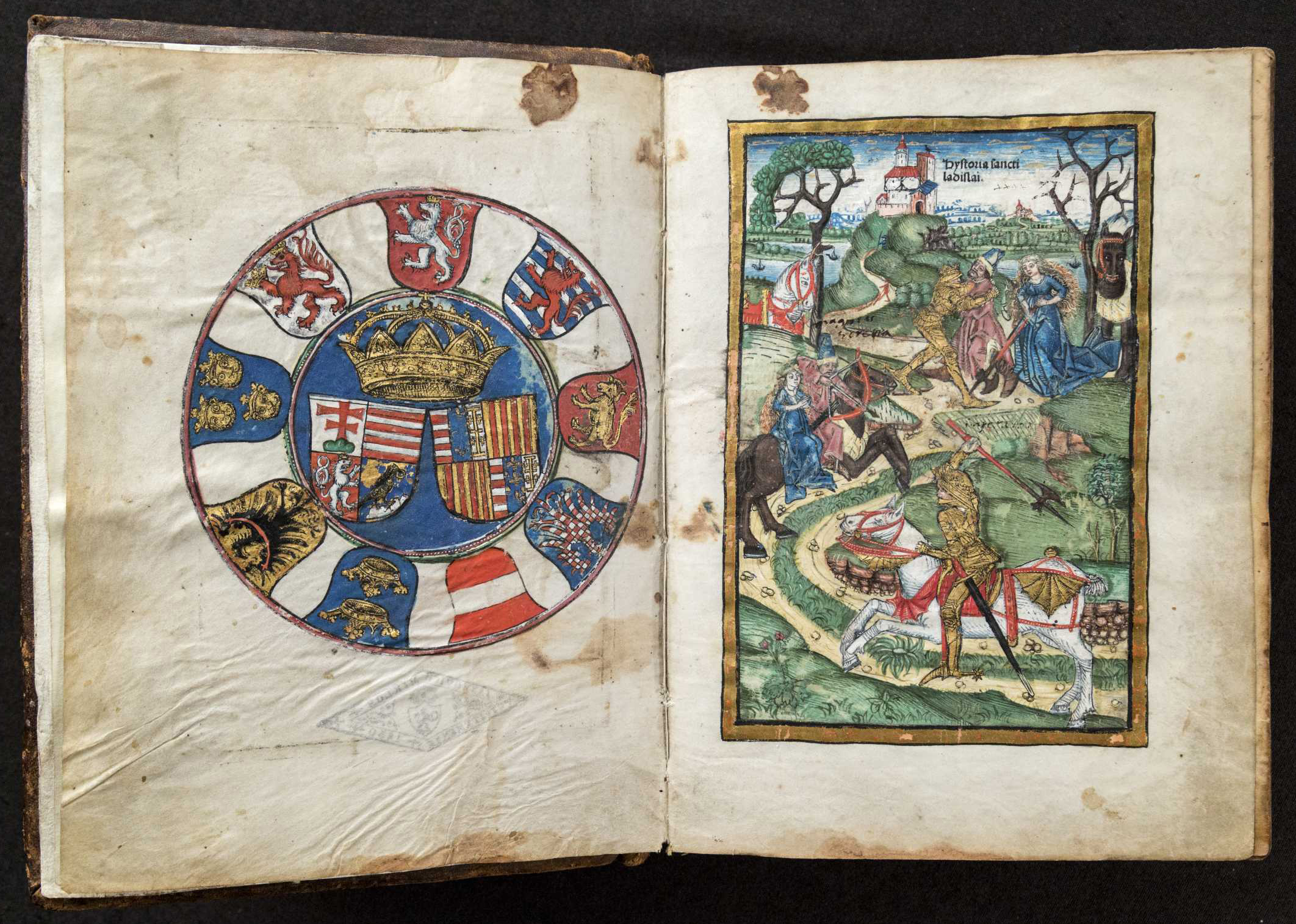
Front page of the 1488 edition of Chronica Hungarorum, which plausibly was the primary source for the Tarih-i Üngürüs

István Borzsák argued, apart from the literary historical aspect, the Tarih-i Üngürüs "does not have any particular importance as a source work, and the recently rediscovered manuscript does not increase knowledge about Hungarian prehistory". Borzsák considered the chronicle should be regarded as a work of fiction, whose purpose was to justify Suleiman's policy. György Hazai emphasized that approximately half of the work tells the story of the centuries before the Hungarian conquest (895). However, these parts "essentially have nothing to do with the factual prehistory of the Hungarians". The presentation of the Hungarians' history was not a goal but a means for the chronicler Mahmud, who transferred the factual material he collected into an authorial concept completely independent of the original chronicle background. Mahmud made arbitrary changes, expansions, omissions. Hazai stated that the Tarih-i Üngürüs "should essentially be eliminated from the list of reliable sources".

Balázs Sudár analyzed that – excluding the texts from Carmen miserabile and Justin's chronicle – 95 percent of the factual material in the Tarih-i Üngürüs shows a match with factual material in the late 15th-century Chronica Hungarorum. Possibly, Mahmud owned a 1488 printed version of it, which contains Carmen miserabile too. The text of the Chronica Hungarorum was expanded by Mahmud in accordance with the traditions of Ottoman chroniclers, mostly for aesthetic, literary and political reasons. Sudár argued the Tarih-i Üngürüs has no historical source value but an important piece of the Ottoman–Hungarian cultural history. Sudár considered that, after separating the figures of speeches of the 16th-century Ottoman prose writing style, the Tarih-i Üngürüs does not contain new nor unique information about Hungarian prehistory. A smaller part of the deviations is the result of translation errors or misunderstandings. Sudár highlighted that Mahmud's knowledge of Latin and his knowledge of Hungarian history were incomplete. Nevertheless, the Tarih-i Üngürüs is a typical court chronicle written for the Ottoman elite (see, for instance, its verse inserts) for political and personal purposes, refusing the statements made by Budenz (a "simple, primitive text") or Blaskovics ("collection of folk songs") before that.

== Comparison of the content with another Hungarian chronicles ==
- The Tarih-i Üngürüs derives Hunor and Magor from Nimrod and his wife Ankisa.
- In the chronicle, the presence of Hungarians (Huns according to the chronicle) is much earlier in the Carpathian Basin than other Hungarian chronicles. The Huns who moved to Pannonia generations before Attila found a people with the same language.
- In the chronicle, the Székelys are Huns and living in Transylvania.
- In the chronicle, Árpád is the descendant of Attila through Csaba.
- In the chronicle, Svatopluk is not Slavic, but German, and was not related to Árpád, but to Attila.

== See also ==
- List of Hungarian chronicles
- Macar Tarihi

== Sources ==
- Blaskovics, József (1982). A magyarok története. Tarih-i Üngürüsz – Madzsar Tarihi [The History of the Hungarians. Tarih-i Üngürüs – Macar Tarihi] (in Hungarian). Magyar Hírmondó, Magvető Könyvkiadó. ISBN 963-271-719-8.
- Grandpierre K., Endre; Grandpierre, Attila; Blaskovics, József (2017). Tárih-i Üngürüsz – A magyarok ősgesztája [Tarih-i Üngürüs – The Ancient Gesta of the Hungarians] (in Hungarian). Angyali Menedék Kiadó. ISBN 978-615-5647-33-8.
- Hazai, György (2009). Nagy Szülejmán udvari emberének magyar krónikája (A Tarih-i Ungurus és kritikája) [The Hungarian Chronicle of Suleiman the Magnificent's Court Historian: The Tarih-i Üngürüs and its Critics] (in Hungarian). Lilium Aurum. ISBN 978-80-8062-395-1.
- Sudár, Balázs (2012). "Az oszmánok és Magyarország mentális meghódítása [The Ottomans and the mental occupation of Hungary]". In Ács, Pál; Székely, Júlia (eds.). Identitás és kultúra a török hódoltság korában. Budapest: Balassi Kiadó. pp. 40–49. ISBN 978-86-7743-139-6.
- Veszprémy, László (2019). Történetírás és történetírók az Árpád-kori Magyarországon (XI–XIII. század közepe) [History Writing and Historians in Hungary during the Reign of the Árpád Dynasty (Eleventh–Mid Thirteenth Century] (in Hungarian). Line Design. ISBN 978-963-480-004-0.
