= Johannes de Thurocz =

Hungarian historian and author

Latin: magister ("judge") Johannes de Thurocz
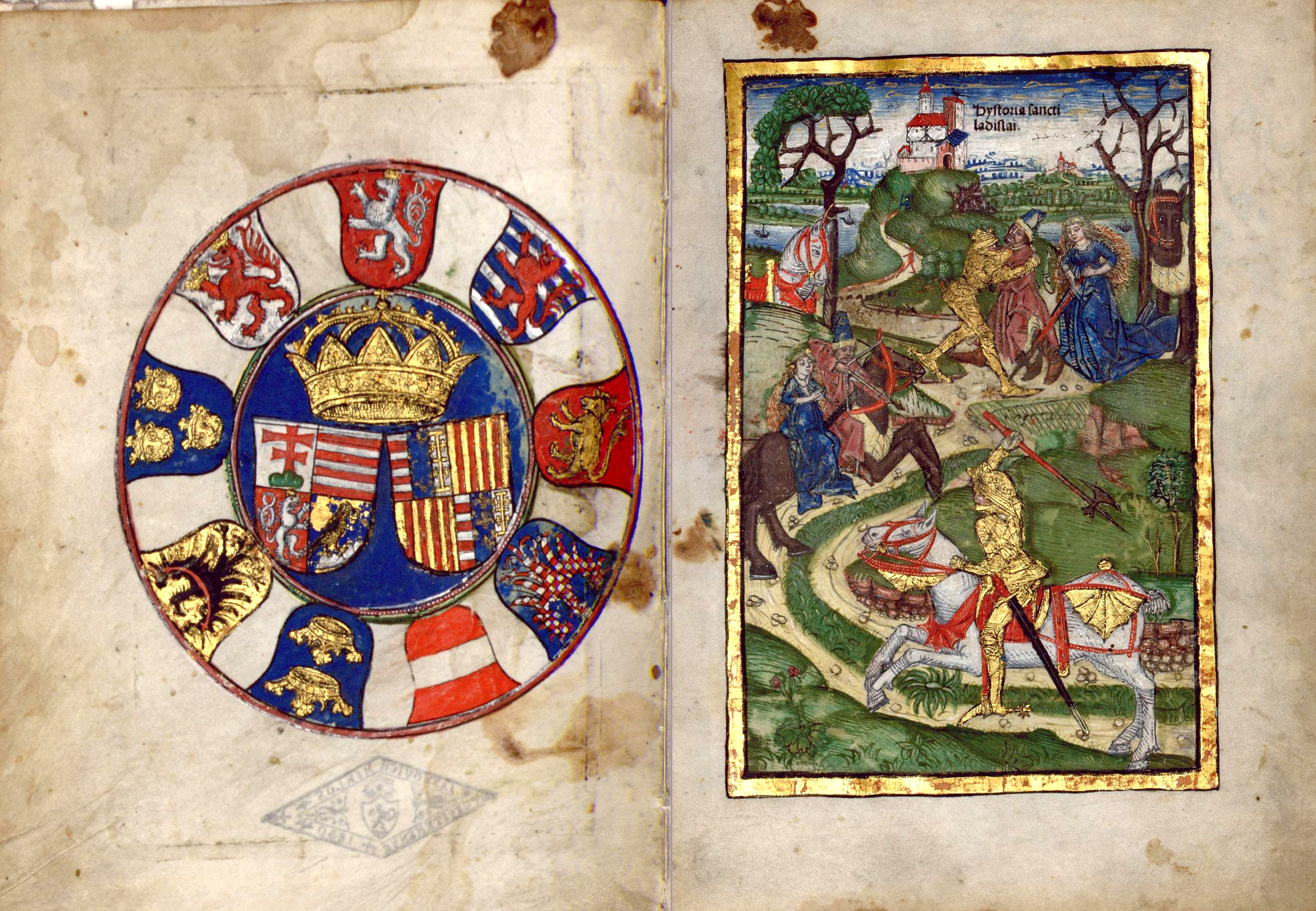
- The first page of Thuroczy's chronicle
- Born: c. 1435
- Died: 1488 or 1489
- Education: Premonstratensian monastery in Ipolyság
- Occupation: Historian
- Writing career
- Language: Latin
- Years active: 1486 – 1488
- Notable work: Chronica Hungarorum

Johannes de Thurocz (Hungarian: Thuróczi János; Slovak: Ján z Turca or Ján de Turocz, German: Johannes de Thurocz, variant contemporary spelling: de Thwrocz) (c. 1435 – 1488 or 1489), was a Hungarian historian and the author of the Latin Chronica Hungarorum ("Chronicle of the Hungarians"), the most extensive 15th-century work on Hungary, and the first chronicle of Hungary written by a layman.

== Life ==
Thurocz's parents came from Turóc County (formerly also spelled as Thurocz), Upper Hungary (now Turiec region, Slovakia) where they were members of a yeoman family recorded since the first half of the 13th century (the village of Nádasér now Nedožery-Brezany). Johannes' uncle Andreas received a property at Pýr as a donation from King Sigismund of Luxembourg, and Johannes' father Peter inherited this estate.

Thurocz was educated in a Premonstratensian monastery in Ipolyság (now Šahy, Slovakia), where he studied Latin and law. In 1465 he appeared in Buda, as a prosecutor of the Premonstratensian monastery of Ipolyság. From 1467 to 1475 he served as a notary of the judge royal Ladislaus Pálóci, from 1476 to 1486 as the main notary of the judge royal Stephen Báthory at the royal court, and from 1486 to 1488 as a head notary and judge of the royal personnel clerk Thomas Drági. No evidence of any university studies has been preserved, and it is possible that the title Latin: "magister" in front of his name was merely a polite title for an official or civil servant.

== Chronicle ==
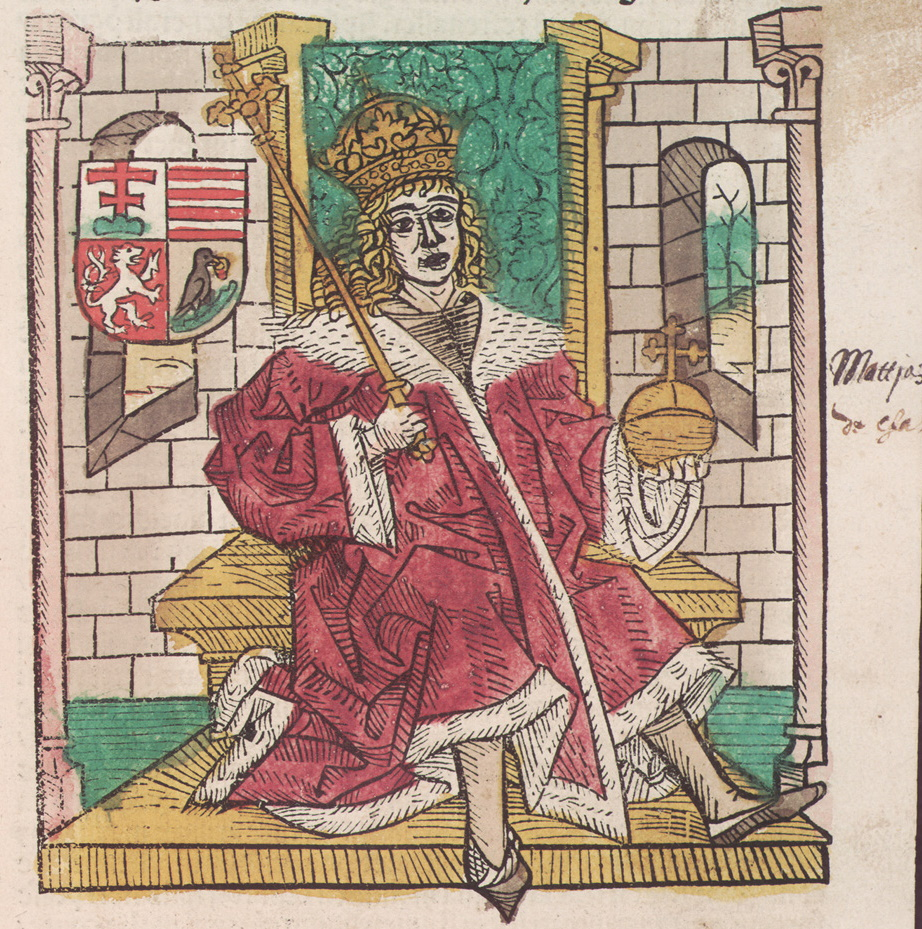
Matthias Corvinus as depicted in Chronica Hungarorum by Johannes de Thurocz

Thurocz's chronicle was written in three main parts:

- The first part is Thurocz's interpretation of a poem by Lorenzo de Monacis of Venice. It deals with the rule of King Charles II of Hungary, and was probably written on the initiative of Thurocz's superior Stephen of Haserhag (the general notary of the Royal court), or perhaps that of the country judge Thomas Drági. Physically, this part is attached to part c) below.
- Thurocz wrote the second part was written in 1486 and describes the deeds of Hungarian kings up to Louis the Great. This part in turn consists of three sub-sections:

1. the so-called Hunnish chronicle based on old Hungarian chronicles (Chronicon Pictum, Buda Chronicle) and preserved manuscripts, in which Thurocz attempts to correct the errors of his predecessors;
2. an interpretation of the history of the Hungarian Kingdom from 895 (arrival of the Magyars) until the rule of King Charles I of Hungary (1307 – 42);
3. a history of part of the reign of Louis I of Hungary (reigned 1342 – 82), which arose through incorporation of a chronicle written by John of Küküllő.

- The third part describes events from the death of King Charles II the Small (died 1386) until the conquest of Vienna and Wiener Neustadt by King Matthias Corvinus in August 1487; this can be considered Thurocz's own original work, and was mostly written in early 1487. It was inspired by the famous historico-geographical lexicon Cosmographia by Aeneas Silvius Piccolomini and was based largely on existing diplomatic documents and letters. However, information from the Cosmographia was selected somewhat one-sidedly and haphazardly.

According to his own words in the work's dedication, Thurocz had no ambitions as an historian. In fact, his chronicle contains many errors and omits a number of significant events. Besides more reliable sources, the work relies extensively on oral tradition, folk songs and anecdotes, and contains many references to "miraculous" events and wonders.

Destiny and fortune play a significant role in history as seen by Thurocz. Like many of his contemporaries he was convinced of the close relationship between human fortune, historical events and the motion of celestial bodies.

Thurocz sought an explanation of a number of events in the moral imperative. He gave much attention to describing the inner feelings of historical characters, but had an evident tendency to idealize the Hungarian heroes Attila and Matthias Corvinus, while downplaying the significance of Hungary's queens.

== Early editions ==
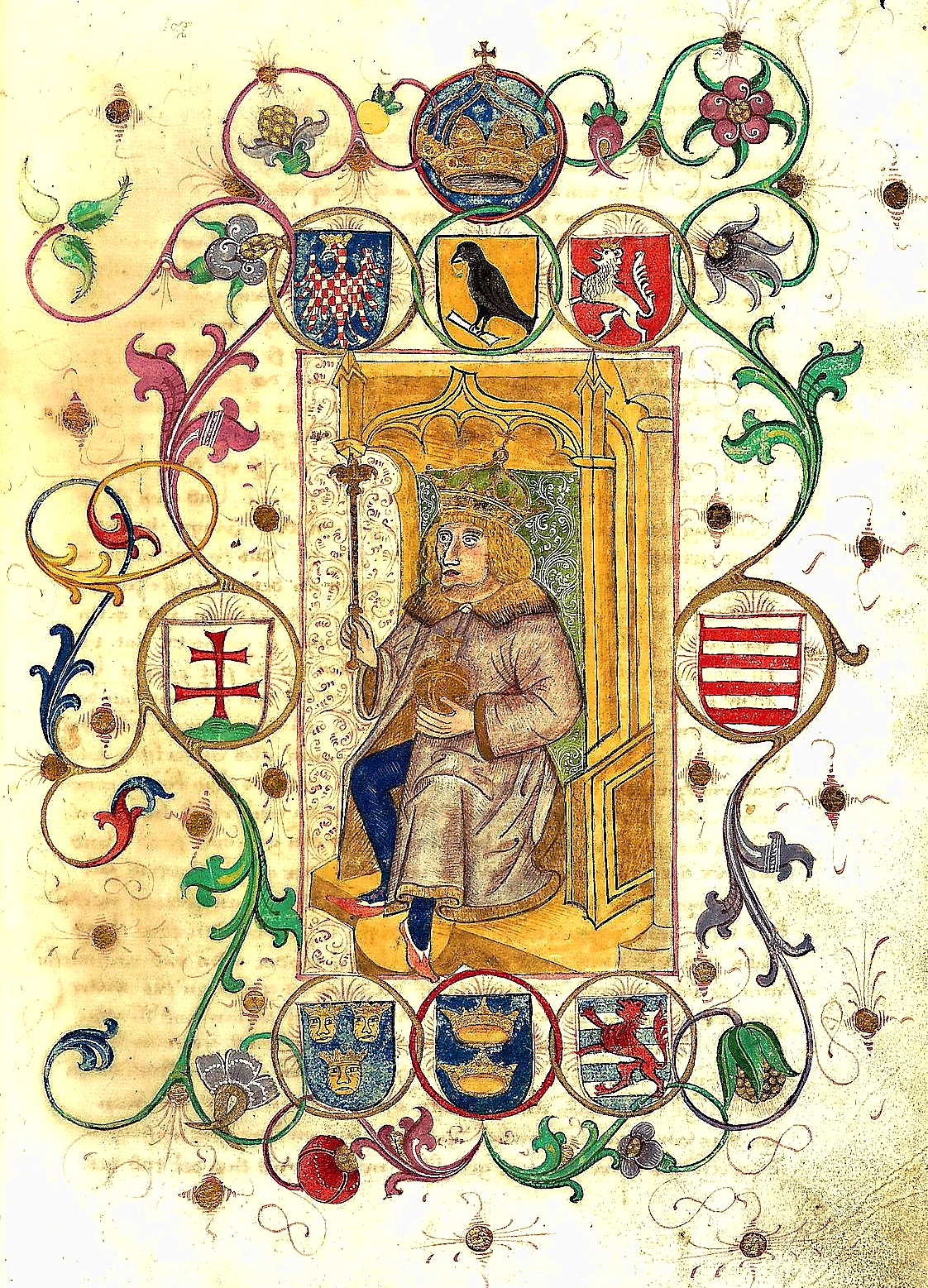
Heraldry of Corvinus as depicted in the 1490 German manuscript

The first editions of Chronica Hungarorum were published in 1488 in Brno, (Moravia) and Augsburg. Further editions followed over the following centuries in Frankfurt, Vienna, Nagyszombat and Buda.

Extant early editions include:

- Illuminations the hand coloured woodcut illustrations (55), the initial letters Inc C 75, accession number F 1450/76 Slovak National Library at Matica slovenská in Martin, Slovakia, the second edition, Augsburgian, 2. version (variant)
- Bucharest, National Library of Romania, Inc. I 41 Datare sigura: 03/07/1488 III Non. Jun. 1488
- The Brno edition, published 20 March 1488, printed by Couradus Stahel and Matthias Preinlein. One copy is preserved at the Biblioteca Mănăstirii Brâncoveanu in Romania; a second at Graz University Library, Austria; and a third in Braşov, Romania (Parohia evanghelică C. A. Biserica Neagră 1251/2).
- The Augsburg Augusta Vindelicorum edition, dated 3 June 1488. Publisher Erhard Ratdolt for Theobald Feger, a citizen of Buda.
- German 1490 manuscript: one copy at Heidelberg (Cod. Pal. germ. 156); another at Cambridge, Massachusetts, Houghton Library, (Ms. Ger. 43 [formerly Nikolsburg, Fürstl. Dietrichsteinsche Bibl., Cod. II 138]).

== See also ==
- Sources of early Hungarian history
- Chronica Hungarorum
