= Macar Tarihi =

18th-century Turkish chronicle about the history of Hungary

- Language: Ottoman Turkish
- Subjects: History of the Hungarians
- Genre: Chronicle
- Published: 1740
- Publication place: Ottoman Empire
- Media type: Manuscript
- Pages: 39

The Macar Tarihi ('Hungarian History') is a small Ottoman Turkish chronicle about the history of the Hungarians, written in 1740. The manuscript is a source of the history of Transylvania during the Ottoman–Habsburg wars and the Great Turkish War.

== Manuscript ==
The 39-page manuscript was preserved in a codex (3386/5, pages 63–101) kept in the library of the Nuruosmaniye Mosque, Istanbul. It was discovered by Turkish scholar Cengiz Orhonlu, who wrote a brief summary about it in 1975. The text was translated into Hungarian and annotated by Turkologist József Blaskovics in 1982.

== Author ==
By analyzing the text, Blaskovics attempted to identify the author. Since Hungarian orthography is almost always impeccable with regard to personal and place names, while German names are distorted, Blaskovics identified the author to be of Hungarian ethnicity. Transylvanian events appear in much more detail, consequently he originated from this region. He used Latin-language sources for his work too (several personal names appear in Latin form), demonstrating his high education. The theological connections of the tendencies of the Reformation appear at several points, thus the author perhaps was a Transylvanian Protestant, who converted to Islam and became a faithful Ottoman Turk.

Blaskovics considered that the author belonged to those Kuruc emigrants who found shelter in the empire, alongside princes Emeric Thököly or Francis II Rákóczi. Others identified him with Ibrahim Muteferrika, who was the first Muslim to run a printing press with movable Arabic type.

== Content ==
In the introduction, the author outlines the purpose of writing the work. He says that he intends to present the history of the Hungarians from the ancient times, since they left behind the "Great Asian Wasteland" (i.e. Pontic–Caspian steppe). According to the chronicle, the Hungarian conquest of the Carpathian Basin occurred in two waves, in 371 and 744. The manuscript identifies the Huns and Avars with Hungarians and claims the Hungarians to be "of Tatar origin" (i.e. close relatives of the Ottomans). The author refuses to identify them as "Turks", in contrast to other chronicles. Thereafter, the work lists the events of Hungarian history in an annalistic way, and is little more than a compilation of brief records. From the mid-16th century to 1740, it is more verbose.

The author's loyalty to the Ottoman Empire is frequently appearing in the text. Géza and Saint Stephen are described as "evil kings" who forced the Hungarians to the "Nazarene religion", who are now living in ignorance (i.e. pagans) to the "true faith" (i.e. Islam). According to the author, the Hungarians lived poverty thereafter, while the glorious Ottoman Empire was a prosperous state. His narration contains many mistakes about the list of kings of Hungary. In addition, he miscalculates the differences between the Islamic and Christian calendars several times, and knows the names and regnal numbers of many kings incorrectly (for instance, he does not distinguish between the names Ladislaus and Vladislaus).

The author has extensive knowledge of the Transylvanian Saxons and expresses great sympathy towards them. According to him, the Saxons already settled in Transylvania before the reign of Attila and afterward a smaller part of them surrendered to the Hungarian conquerors. The author states that most of the towns and castles in the region were built by the Saxons. He presents a "confusing" story about the Slovaks where they arrived to the Carpathian Basin alongside Attila, but later completely perished in the Avar Wars.

In addition to the historical events, the author pays special attention to the natural disasters that afflict Transylvania (for instance, fires in Kolozsvár in 1655, 1697 and 1724, earthquake, fire, plague and earthquake in Brassó in 1684, 1689, 1718 and 1738, respectively, plague in Szeben in 1718 and rinderpest in entire Hungary and Transylvania in 1678 and 1709). The text also talks about comets appearing in the sky (1680, 1737). The chronicle ends with the famine wave of 1740.

The text also contains some world history events (e.g. a certain priest Seyarius's invention of rifles and cannons in 1380, the invention of book printing in Mainz in 1452 and the discovery of the Americas by Christopher Columbus in 1492). At the end of the text, the author attached an appendix, which contains geographical, sociohistorical and administrative reference about Hungary. Here, the text describes the present situation, the Germans' "violent and oppressive rule" in Hungary.

== See also ==
- Tarih-i Üngürüs

== Sources ==
- Blaskovics, József (1982). A magyarok története. Tarih-i Üngürüsz – Madzsar Tarihi [The History of the Hungarians. Tarih-i Üngürüs – Macar Tarihi] (in Hungarian). Magyar Hírmondó, Magvető Könyvkiadó. ISBN 963-271-719-8.
