= András Hess =

András Hess (Latin: Andreas Hess; fl. 1470–1473) was a printer of German origin who established the first printing press in the Kingdom of Hungary. Working in Buda under the patronage of Archbishop János Vitéz and Provost László Karai, Hess printed the Chronica Hungarorum (Buda Chronicle), completed on 5 June 1473, the eve of Pentecost. This work, written in Latin, is regarded as the first book ever printed in Hungary and marks the beginning of Hungarian printing history.

== Life ==
He used the Latinized form of his name, Andreas Hess, which appears in the dedication of the Chronica Hungarorum (also known as the Buda Chronicle), as well as in the closing lines of the work, the colophon: “Finita Bude anno Domini MCCCCLXXIII in vigilia penthecostes: per Andrea Hess”, meaning “Completed in Buda in the year of Our Lord 1473, on the eve of Pentecost, by Andreas Hess.” With this final sentence of the Buda Chronicle, the history of printing in Hungary begins. According to József Fitz, Hess’s original surname may have been “Huss,” which he possibly changed upon arriving at the court of King Matthias Corvinus. This idea is explored in János Fodor’s historical novel. Research by Gedeon Borsa and Zoltánné Soltész indicates that János Vitéz, Archbishop of Esztergom, commissioned László Karai, provost of Buda and vice-chancellor to King Matthias, to invite Hess from Lauer’s printing house in Rome to Buda in the late spring of 1471 (or, according to some sources, 1472). Fitz and Soltész note that in February 1472 Hess was still in Rome, as evidenced by the fact that Lauer was still using the type matrices later employed in the Chronica. With the support of 2,000 silver florins, Hess established in 1472 the first—and at that time only—printing press in Hungary, preceding most European countries in this regard. After 1473, the press ceased operation, and no further traces of it have been found. Some researchers attribute this to Hess’s death.

== Printed works ==
=== A page from the Chronica Hungarorum ===
Published on 5 June 1473, the Chronica Hungarorum (Buda Chronicle) was printed in Latin on 67 pages, using rounded Antiqua type, on thick white paper probably of South German origin. The work is based on a 14th-century chronicle compilation and presents Hungarian history in two parts, from the earliest times up to the reign of King Matthias Corvinus. The first part was created by merging several earlier historical texts, while the second covers the period from the death of King Louis I of Hungary to Matthias’s Moldavian campaign in 1468, where the chronicle ends. The final section is the work of an unknown author. The work became known as the Chronicon Budense (Buda Chronicle) following the naming convention introduced by Sándor Domanovszky. Because it belongs to the same textual tradition, its content largely overlaps with that of János Thuróczy’s chronicle, published in 1488. The first dedication was probably intended for János Vitéz, Archbishop of Esztergom. However, due to the unfavorable political circumstances, Hess was forced to dedicate the work to another patron—László Karai, the provost of Buda—who had provided him with lodging in the Buda Castle area, now known as Hess András Square. The Chronica Hungarorum is considered a typographical rarity. In Hungary, copies are preserved at the National Széchényi Library and the Library of Eötvös Loránd University. Eight additional copies are held in foreign collections—in Paris, Prague, Saint Petersburg, Rome, Leipzig, Kraków, Vienna, and New Jersey. More handwritten copies of the printed work have survived, among them one that belonged to the renowned German polymath Hartmann Schedel.

=== De legendis poetis ===
According to Zoltánné Soltész, the last work printed by Hess’s press was the undated Magni Basilii de legendis poetis (“On the Reading of Poets”). The edition contains two works: De legendis poetis by Basil the Great, a widely read text published several times in the Renaissance, and Apologia Socratis (“The Apology of Socrates”) by Xenophon. Both were translated from Greek into Latin by the Italian humanist Leonardo Bruni. Basil the Great addresses his reader as a friend, urging the cultivation of lasting spiritual values over worldly goods. He illustrates his argument with everyday examples—the work of bees, the practice of musicians and athletes—showing that all progress is achieved step by step. Young readers, he argues, should likewise acquire enduring values through the works of ancient authors. “Xenophon sought to depict the historical and human figure of his master, applying Socrates’s ideas and principles to practical life. He followed this method in his brief work on the philosopher’s trial and death, showing through Socrates’s own words the heroism with which he accepted his sentence.” Based on available evidence, Hess was the first to publish this work, implying that he may have received the manuscript in Buda. The paper used for this edition came from the same mill as that of the Chronica Hungarorum, though the watermarks differ. Unusually for the time, the colophon bears only Hess’s initials: “Sic finis libelli Basilii est per A. H. Bude” (“Here ends the book of Basil, by A. H. in Buda”). Moreover, this colophon does not appear at the end of the book but after the first treatise, on the recto of the fifteenth leaf, as space allowed only there. “The print consists of two quires—two gatherings of ten leaves each—with 24 lines per page. The final (fortieth) page was so tightly set that the compositor had to compress the words and make frequent use of abbreviations.” Today, only two printed copies are known to survive: one in Vienna and one in Eichstätt.

== The Printing Press ==
“It seems that the first printing press in Hungary operated with a single press, and the most complex task, the typesetting, was carried out by Hess himself. Earlier theories assumed three presses and about a dozen assistants. Although there has been debate over whether the Buda printer cast his type locally or brought it from Rome, it is most likely that Hess traveled to Buda in the spring of 1471 carrying his half-hundredweight set of type rather than matrices, since worn types could easily have been replaced using the latter.” According to Gedeon Borsa, it was common practice for newly independent printers not to receive matrices but only a supply of type. József Fitz estimated Hess’s type set at twenty-one capital letters, twenty-five lowercase letters, four ligatures, twenty-six abbreviation marks, and four punctuation marks. “One often-debated question concerns the pace at which the Chronica was printed. If we accept Borsa’s argument that the work must have been started before the death of János Vitéz (to whom the original dedication was addressed), Hess would have had roughly ten months to complete it, assuming his arrival in Buda in the spring of 1472. Yet this raises the question of why Hess wrote in the dedication that he had long been without work, when this period could have lasted only from April to July—no more than four months, likely even less.” It is therefore more probable that he began his work in 1471, printing about seven or eight pages per month. Aladár Ballagi believed that the printing press was ultimately destroyed by some natural disaster.

Today a square is named after him in Budapest.
