= Buda Chronicle =

1473 Hungarian historical chronicle

Chronica Hungarorum – Buda Chronicle
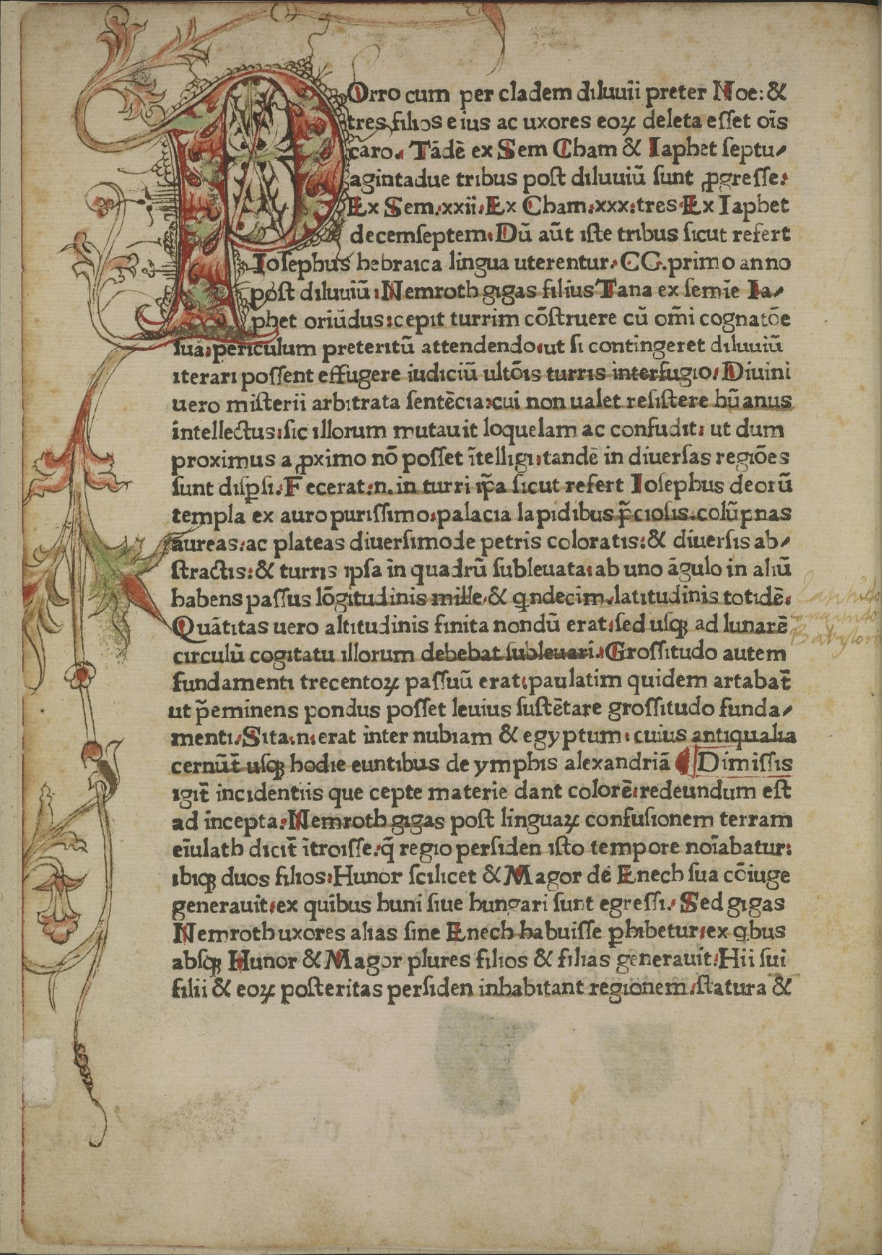
- Chronica Hungarorum by András Hess from 1473, better known as the "Buda Chronicle". This edition is stored today in the Princeton University Library in United States, which is one from the original editions.
- Author: András Hess
- Original title: Chronica Hungarorum
- Language: Latin
- Subjects: History of the Hungarians
- Genre: Chronicle
- Published: 1473
- Publication place: Kingdom of Hungary
- Media type: Print
- Pages: 133

The Buda Chronicle (Hungarian: Budai krónika) is a 15th-century chronicle treating the early and medieval Hungarian history. While its original name is Chronica Hungarorum (Latin for "Chronicle of the Hungarians"; Hungarian: A magyarok krónikája), the chronicle is better known as the "Buda Chronicle" since the 19th century. Its text is eponymous part of the so-called Buda Chronicle family. The Buda Chronicle was printed in the capital of the Kingdom of Hungary in Buda by András Hess in 1473, becoming the first book printed in Hungary. With printing, the Buda Chronicle was not forgotten for centuries long as its predecessor Hungarian medieval chronicles, which were in manuscript codices, however the content of the Buda Chronicle soon became obsolete due to the more extensive Hungarian history of the Thuróczy Chronicle, which was published in 1488, which also bears the same title "Chronica Hungarorum".

== History ==
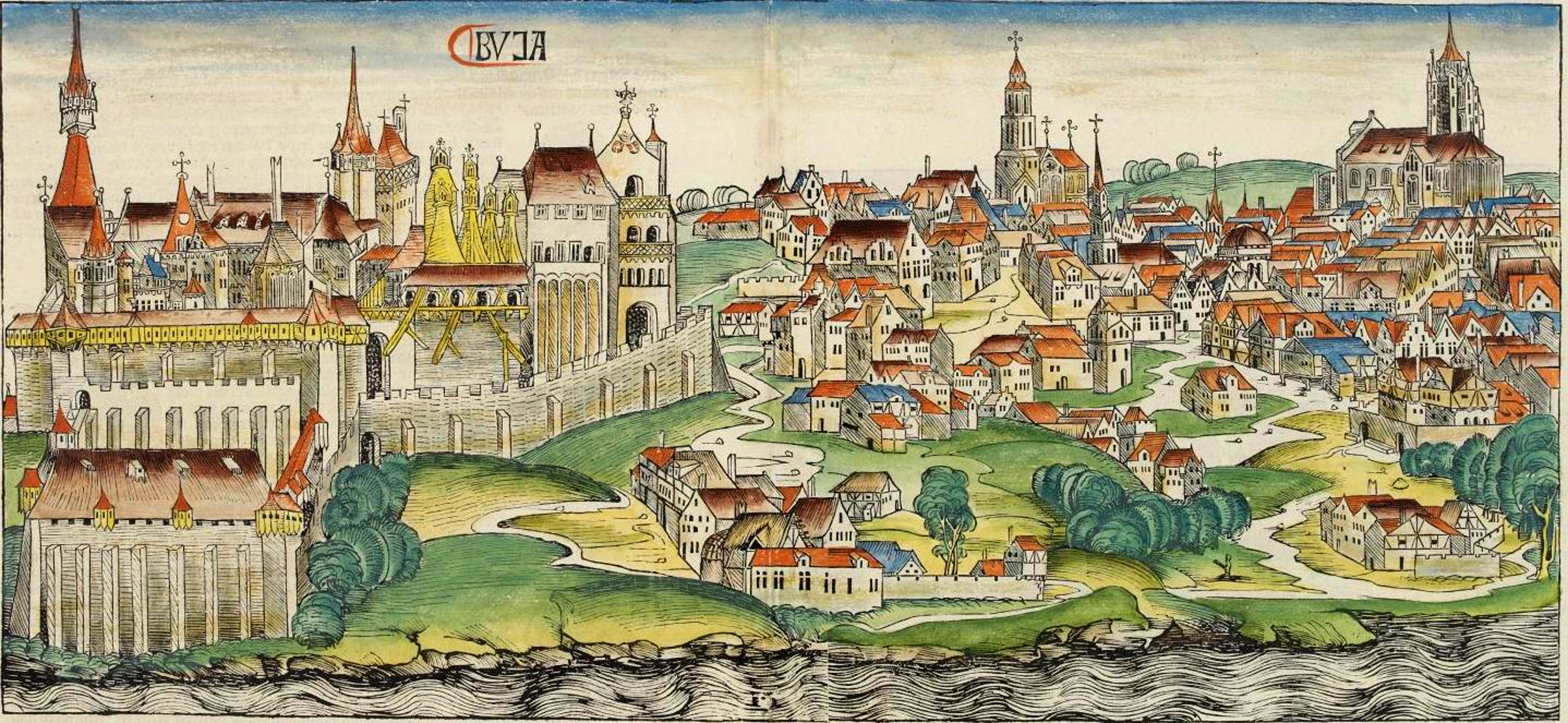
Buda, the capital of the Kingdom of Hungary as depicted in the Nuremberg Chronicle in 1493

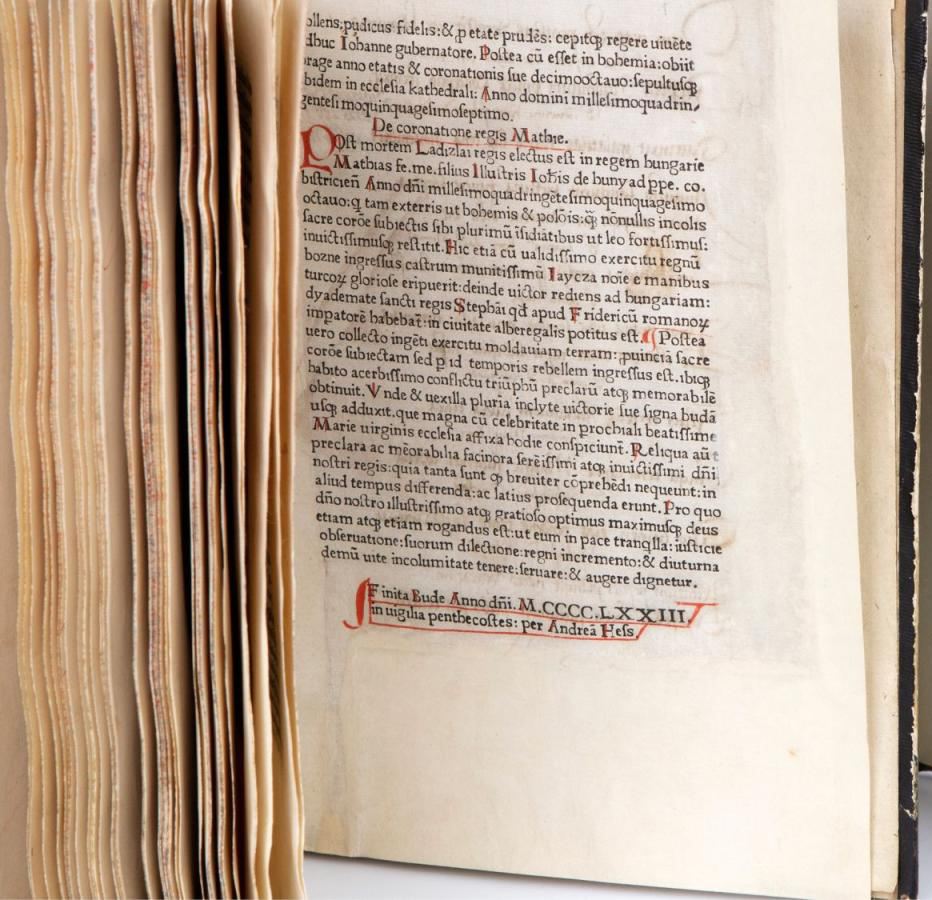
Colophon of the Buda Chronicle: "Finita Bude anno Domini MCCCCLXXIII in vigilia penthecostes: per Andream Hess" ("Finished in Buda in the year of the Lord 1473 on the eve of Pentecost by András Hess.") This original edition is stored today in the National Széchényi Library in Hungary.

The Buda Chronicle was published on the eve of Pentecost, 5 June 1473. It was produced by András Hess in Buda, and this is the first incunabulum ever printed in Hungary. Thus, the year 1473 is considered the beginning of Hungarian book printing. The Chronica Hungarorum from the Hess printing house is about the history of the Hungarians, which is unique, because the history of book printing in other European countries does not begin with the publication of the history of the nation, (only Rodrigo Sánchez de Arévalo's Compendiosa historia Hispanica precedes it as printed national historical work in 1470, but this was printed in Rome by Ulrich Han). The Hungarian book printing preceded England, Spain, and Austria. At the end of the 1470s, 66 printing houses could operate in whole Europe, two of which were in the Kingdom of Hungary: in the Hungarian capital Buda and in Pozsony (now Bratislava). With printing, the Buda Chronicle avoided the fate of its predecessor chronicles (for instance, Gesta Hungarorum, Gesta Hunnorum et Hungarorum, Chronicon Pictum), which were in manuscript codices and were forgotten for many centuries until they were discovered by historians of the later centuries.

I took on a huge job that required many days, namely the printing of the Chronicle of Pannonia, a job that I believe is kind and heartwarming to all Hungarians.

— András Hess: Chronica Hungarorum

== Content ==
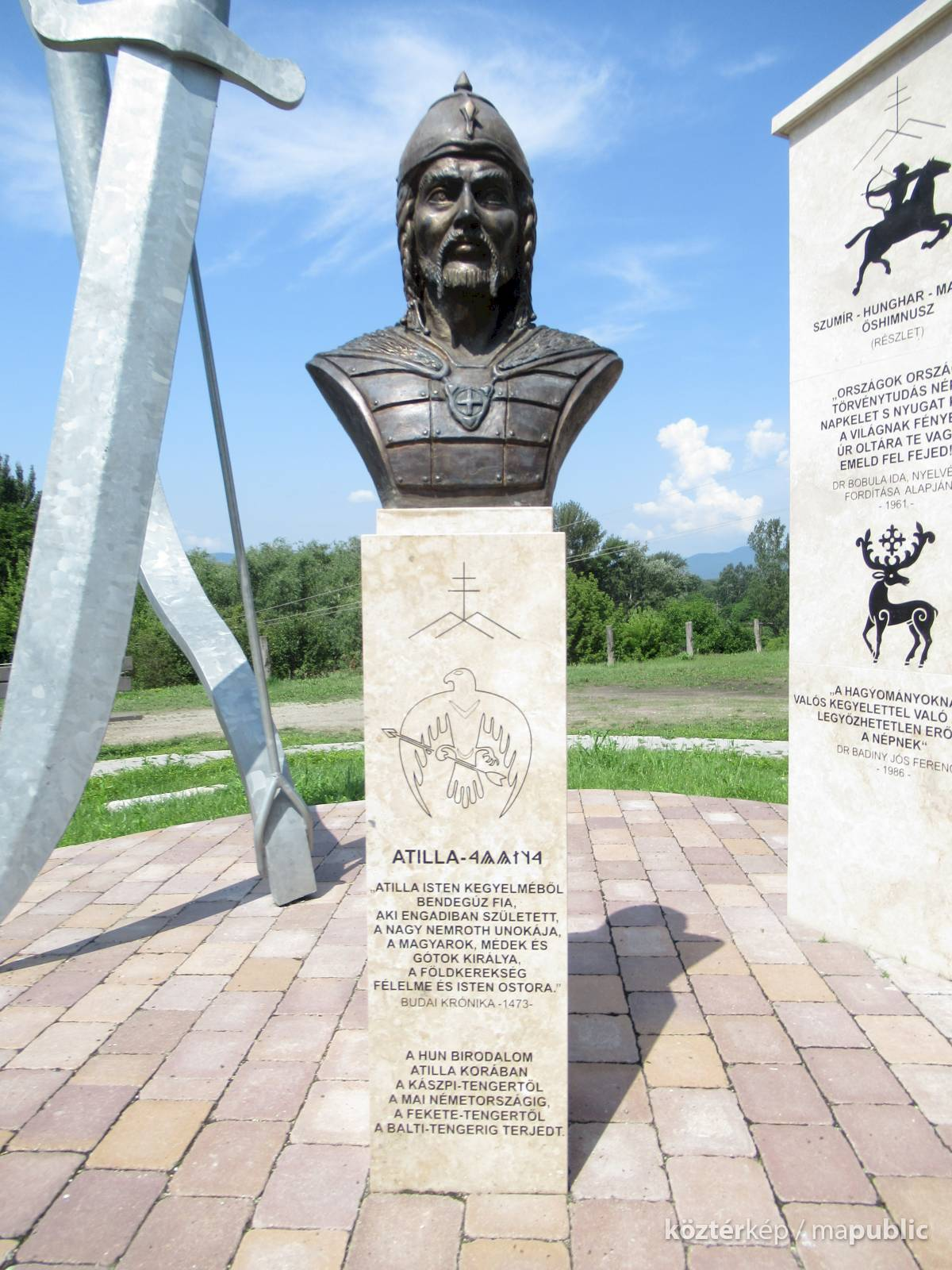
Attila statue (Dunakeszi, Hungary) "Attila son of Bendegúz by the grace of God, who was raised in Engaddi, grandson of the great Nimrod, King of Hungarians, Medes and Goths, the Terror of the World, the Scourge of God." — Buda Chronicle, 1473

The Chronica Hungarorum (Chronicle of the Hungarians) tells the history of Hungarians subdividing into 246 chapters in 133 printed pages, starting from the Hun-Hungarian origin until the reign of King Matthias of Hungary up to 1468. The Buda Chronicle was created by merging several historical works. The first part of the chronicle is a text variant of the 14th-century Hungarian chronicle composition that tells the history of the Hungarians from the earliest times to 1334. The second part contains the last times of the reign of King Charles I of Hungary, the events of the period between 1335 and 1342. The third part contains the history of King Louis the Great. The fourth part contains the period between 1382 and 1468, which also describes the events related to the contemporary reign of King Matthias of Hungary.

=== First part (–1334) ===
The first part of the Buda Chronicle is a text variant of the 14th-century Hungarian chronicle composition, which itself was produced by the compilation of several older gestas and chronicles made at different times. It narrates history from biblical times. The basic premise of the Hungarian medieval chronicle tradition that the Huns, i.e. the Hungarians coming out twice from Scythia, the guiding principle was the Hun-Hungarian continuity. The 14th-century Hungarian chronicle composition included the history of the Huns and the history of the Hungarians from the Hungarian conquest of the Carpathian Basin to the year 1334 of the reign of King Charles I of Hungary. The Buda Chronicle preserved the most detailed narration on the assassination of Ladislaus IV of Hungary (1290).

=== Second part (1335–1342) ===
The second part of the chronicle contains the last regnal years of King Charles I of Hungary. Hess used a version of the 14th-century Hungarian chronicle from the era of King Charles I up to 1342, which contains many differences compared to both the Acephalus Codex and the Sambucus Codex. The part about the last years, death and burial of King Charles I can only be read in the Buda Chronicle. Originally, this part was recorded by a contemporary eyewitness of the events. In addition to the detailed prose narration, the text also contains a 15-line leonine verse about Charles' death.

=== Third part (1342–1382) ===
The third part of the Buda Chronicle contains the Chronicle of John of Küküllő, which is about the history of King Louis I of Hungary until 1382. Hess does not mention John of Küküllő, the name of the author, omitting its prologue. Hess (or the text editor) revised the first half of the first chapter significantly, but after that he is faithful to John's chronicle. The editor completely omitted the 5th and 14th chapters of the aforementioned work, while other sections were slightly modified.

=== Fourth part (1382–1468) ===
The last fourth part of the chronicle is only four pages, the editor has condensed the events of the recent past and of his own time, it tells the story of eight decades from the death of King Louis I in 1382 to the end of the Moldavian campaign of King Matthias Corvinus in 1468. The editor of this part is unknown, this is the only original content of the chronicle, which was compiled either by Hess himself or by a chancellery employee. This section until 1458 is nothing more than a chronological data series of the monarchs with their times of reign, family relations, places of deaths and burials, which is annalistic in character. Historian Gyula Kristó argued the fourth part of the work, compared to a 15th century chronicle, is "antiquated" and "flat" in its text, manner of narration and perception. The chronicle says that "In Queen Mary, the branch of the holy kings of Hungary in both sexes became extinct". Kristó considered that this indicated the success of the Capetian House of Anjou's effort to present their own dynasty as a close and direct continuation of the Árpáds.

In this part, the content has a big disproportion: despite that King Albert of Habsburg (1437–1439) reigned for barely 2 years, he received almost as much content as King Sigismund of Luxemburg (1387–1437), who reigned for 50 years. The author sympathized with Regent John Hunyadi, whose person receives as much surface in the narrative as the kings. King Matthias Corvinus, Hunyadi's son, is only mentioned in a short chapter at the end of the chronicle: about his election as king in 1458, the recapture of Jajca from the Ottomans in Bosnia in 1463, the recovery of the Holy Crown of Hungary from Frederick III, Holy Roman Emperor in 1464, and the return of King Matthias from his Moldavian campaign in 1468, which ended in a victory for Matthias according to the chronicle. The story of the Buda Chronicle ends suddenly at 1468, the Hungarian history of the last four years (1469–1473) is missing, possibly in order to avoid discussing politically sensitive developments (e.g. John Vitéz's failed conspiracy against the monarch and the invasion of King Casimir IV of Poland in 1471, the captivity and death of John Vitéz in 1472). Nevertheless, Matthias is called as "brave and invincible lion" by the chronicle. The fourth part confirms that this text was written in Buda: for instance, it narrates that Matthias placed his victory badges and flags after the Moldavian campaign in the Church of the Assumption in Buda, "where they can still be seen today". The Hess printing house was not far from the Church of the Assumption (better known as Matthias Church), and the editor of the Buda Chronicle might have been Ladislaus Karai, who lived nearby in Buda.

== Prints ==
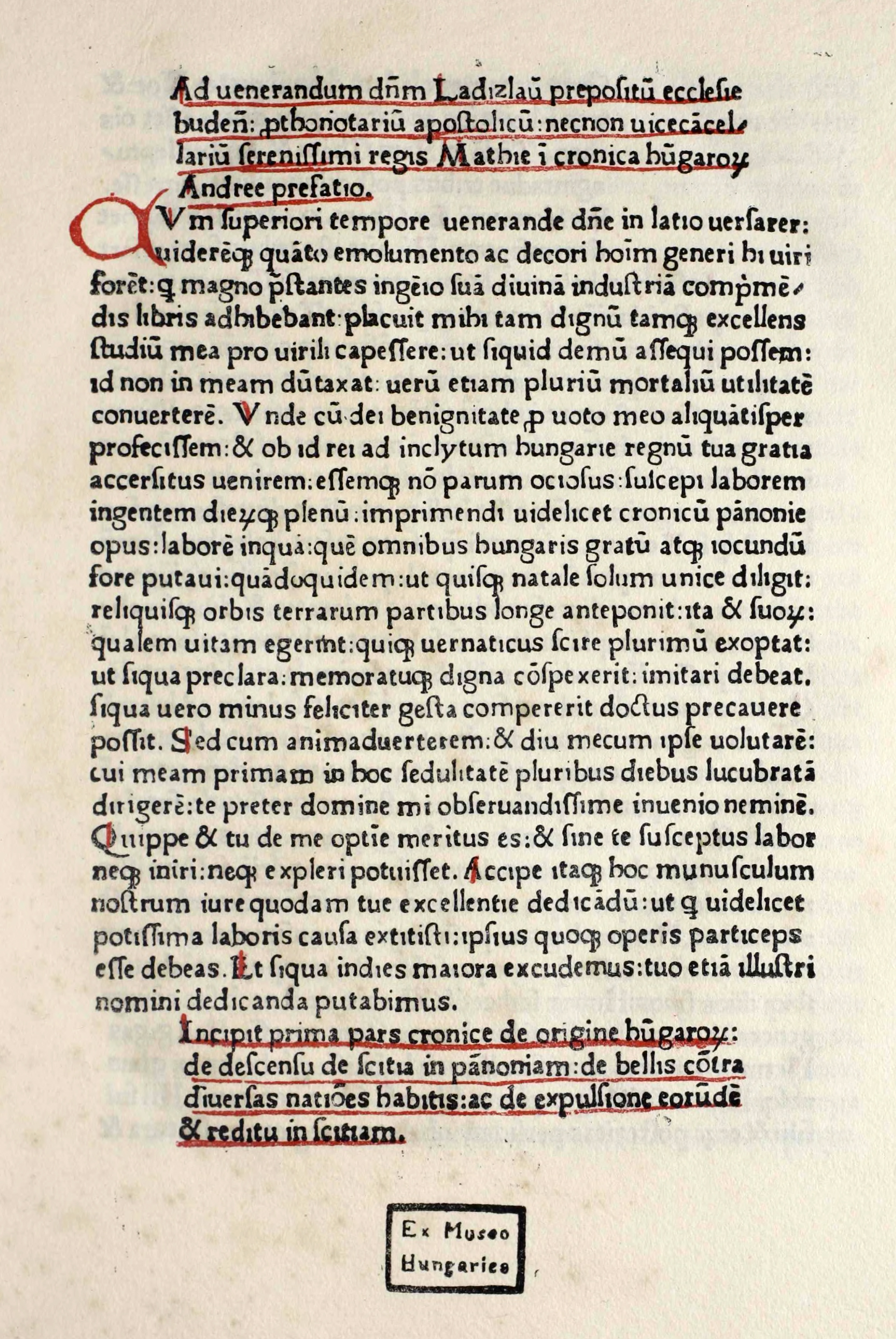
The chronicle's dedication to Chief Justice Ladislaus Karai, the preface of that original edition which stored in the National Széchényi Library in Hungary.

Hess dedicated his chronicle to Ladislaus Karai, chief justice of the court, who had invited him to Hungary and supported his publishing house financially, providing accommodation and workshop to Hess. Initially, Archbishop John Vitéz, who by then had fallen from favor and died, is also cited as patron of the printing. According to assumptions, Hess would have originally dedicated the work to Vitéz, but due to the changing political situation, he was forced to modify this. Due to the smaller font size, it is plausible that this part of dedication was completed last beside the colophon.

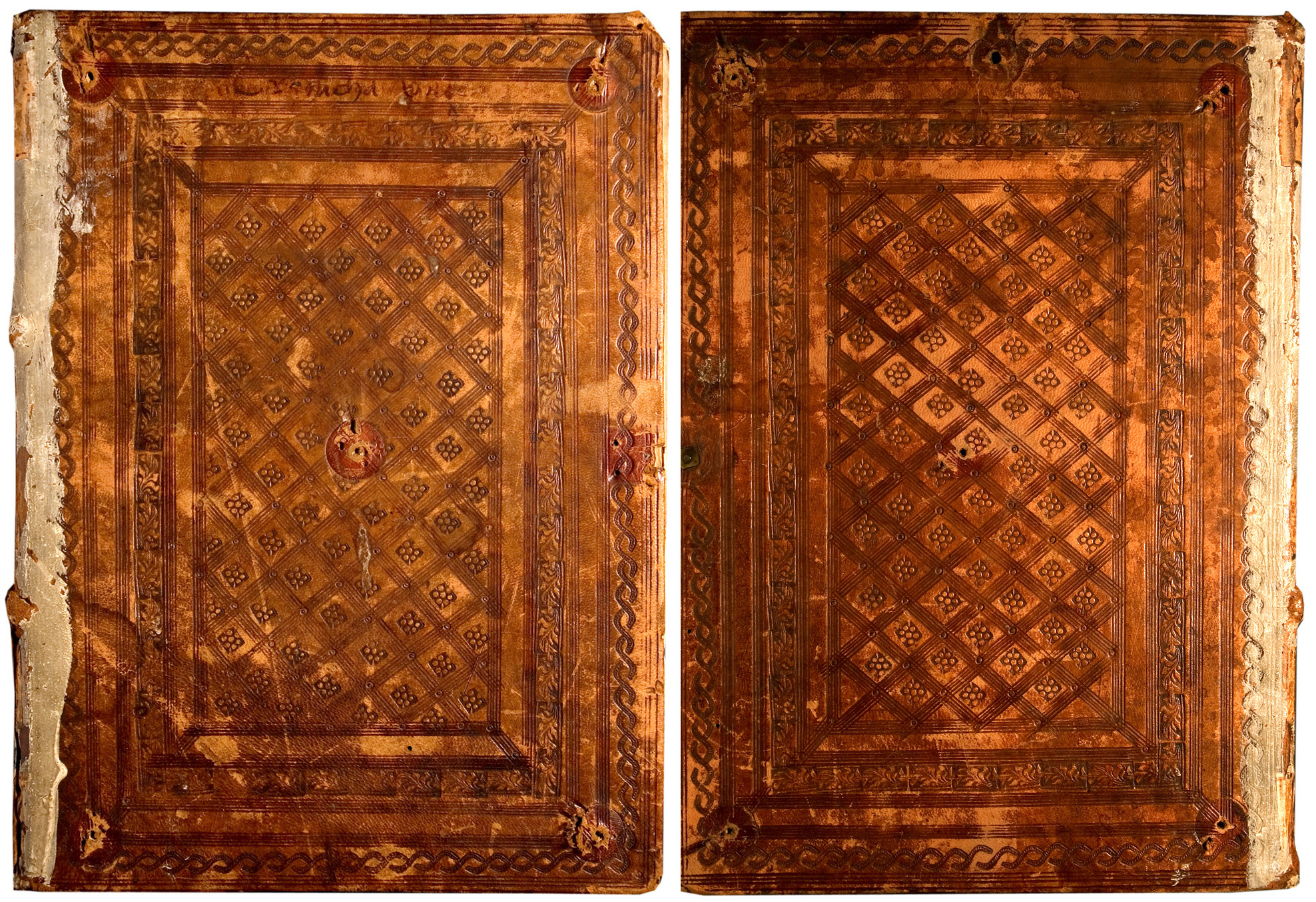
Original decorative binding of the chronicle from the Hess printing house in Buda, which edition is stored today in the National Library of the Czech Republic in Prague.

In 1473, the production cost of the Buda Chronicle was about 100 gold coins, and the price of the paper was about half amount of the cost. At that time, it was possible to buy a house in the field below the Buda Castle for 100 gold coins. The purchase price of the more decorative edition of the chronicle was 2 gold coins, the less decorative one was 1 gold coin. At that time, 1 gold coin was equal to 100 denarius, which was the monthly wage of a day laborer. High priests and educated, high-ranked officials of the royal court, and lower-ranked clerks were the buyers of the chronicle. Philologist János Horváth Jr. noted that Hess' Chronica Hungarorum contains "quite a lot of typos".

About 240–250 copies were printed, with 10 surviving to modern day, not least because they were sent abroad before the Battle of Mohács in 1526. Only two copies remained in the original decorative binding from the bookbinding workshop in Buda. Currently, two of the surviving printed copies are in Hungary: in the National Széchényi Library and in the Eötvös Loránd University Library. The other surviving printed copies are in the Polish National Museum in Kraków, in the University Library in Leipzig, in the France National Library in Paris, in the Charles University Library in Prague, in the Scheide Library in Princeton, in the National Academy of Lincei Library and Corsiniana in Rome, in the Russian National Library in Saint Petersburg, and in the Austrian National Library in Vienna. The book stored in Princeton is the most recently discovered original print, the chronicle was sold at an auction for 420,000 West German marks in 1990.

At the end of the printed chronicle text, the edition which stored in the National Széchényi Library also contains handwritten leonine verses from three authors about dates of birth and death of Hungarian monarchs, some historical events in accordance with the perpetual calendar Cisiojanus. The last verse refers to the sack of Várad (today Oradea, Romania) by the Ottomans in February 1474.

== Legacy ==
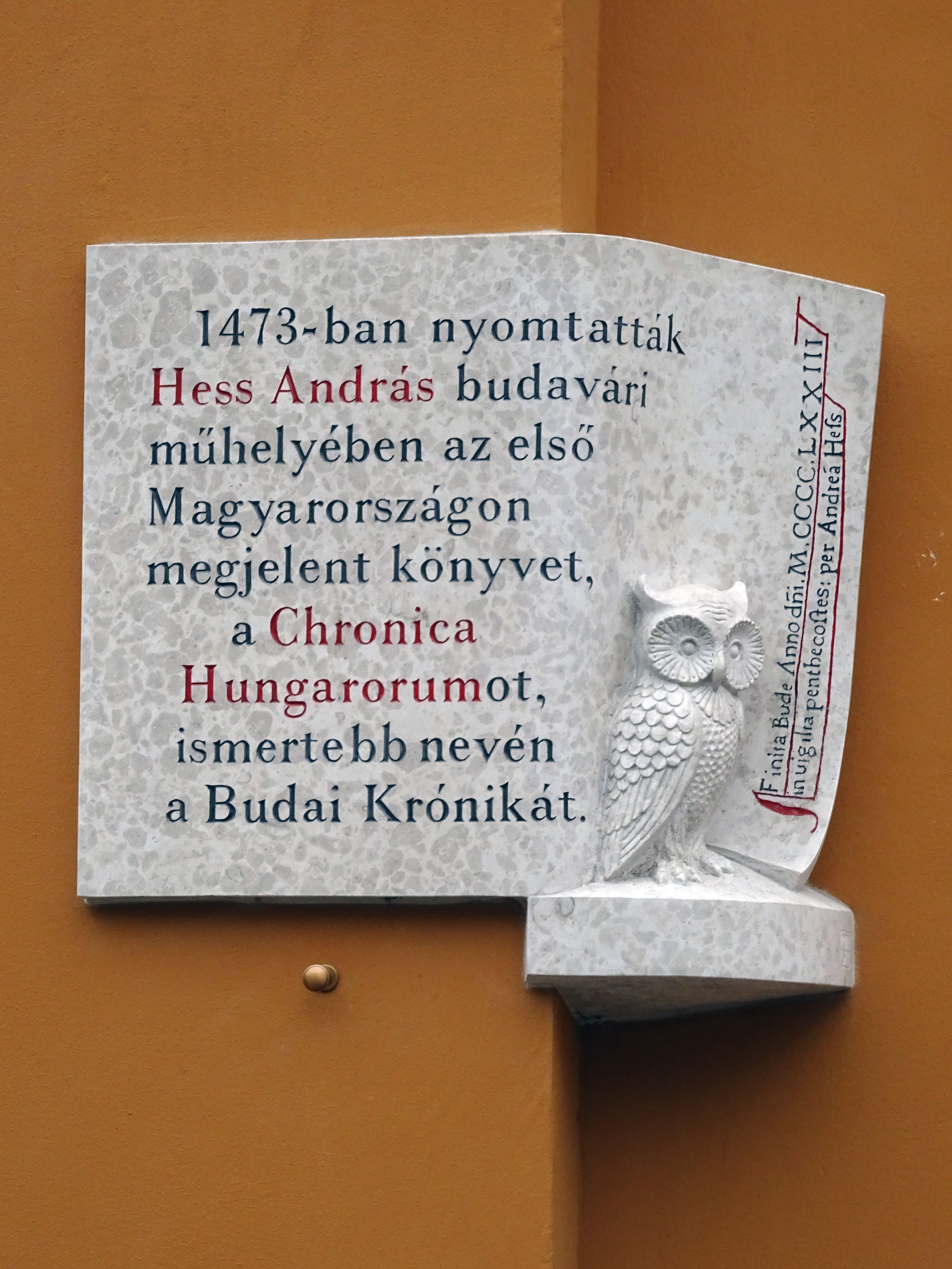
András Hess plaque on the place of the Hess printing house in Budapest ( Tibor Rieger , 2016)

The Buda Chronicle was the main source for the creation of the manuscript Dubnic Chronicle in 1479, which took over the text of the second part (1335–1342) regarding the death and burial of Charles I, in addition to the last events of his reign too. The Thuróczy Chronicle also pasted this section. An earlier draft of the Buda Chronicle was utilized by the author of the Chronicon Posoniense too.

The content of the Buda Chronicle soon became obsolete due to the more extensive summary of Hungarian history of the Thuróczy Chronicle, which was printed and published in 1488, which also bears the same title "Chronica Hungarorum". There is also an argument that King Matthias preferred ornate, illustrated and representative codices in comparison to printed books that are simple in appearance, like the Buda Chronicle, which accelerated the development of its neglect. Following John Vitéz's political fall, this project lost its only true patron.

Several handwritten copies of the Buda Chronicle are known from the Middle Ages (the first known is Johannes Menestarffer's from 1481) to the 18th century. Since the 15th century, the Chronica Hungarorum by Hess was first republished in 1838 by academician József Podhraczky as Chronicon Budense in Latin, since that time the historiographical name of the chronicle is "Buda Chronicle". By the re-release, the chronicle became easily accessible to everyone, while important other chronicle manuscripts still had to be discovered in the hidden corners of libraries. Those manuscripts that became known later were compared to the Buda Chronicle and the Illuminated Chronicle from the perspective of the kinship of texts, thus a group of other Hungarian chronicles were named after the Buda Chronicle: the so-called Buda Chronicle family. And another group of other Hungarian chronicles were named after the Illuminated Chronicle: the so-called Illuminated Chronicle family, which preserved more extensive passages of text with several interpolations. The 14th-century Acephalus Codex, the 15th-century Sambucus Codex, Vatican Codex and the aforementioned Dubnic Chronicle made in 1479 belongs to the Buda Chronicle family.

A facsimile edition of the Buda Chronicle was published in 1900 by Gusztáv Ranschburg, an introductory study was provided by historian Bishop Vilmos Fraknói. At the 500th anniversary of the chronicle, the first complete Hungarian translation was published in 1973 by Magyar Helikon. On the occasion of the 550th anniversary of the publication event, the National Széchény Library published a new facsimile edition of the chronicle in 2023. This most complete edition includes the reprints and the Hungarian translation and study.

== See also ==
- List of Hungarian chronicles
- Gesta Hungarorum
- Gesta Hunnorum et Hungarorum
- Chronicon Pictum
- Chronica Hungarorum – Thuróczy Chronicle
- Epitome rerum Hungarorum
- Nádasdy Mausoleum
