= Nedožery-Brezany =

- Municipality
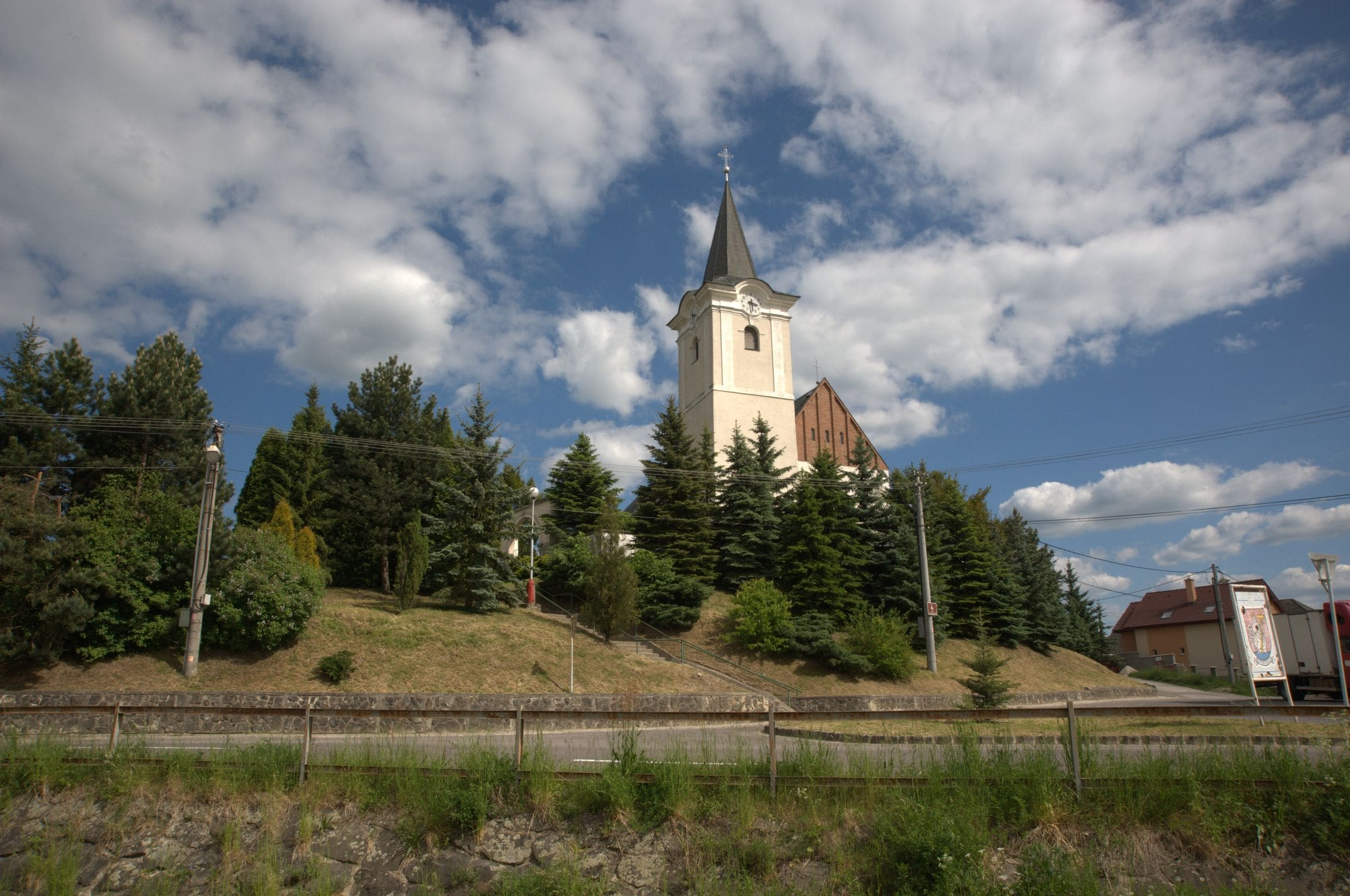

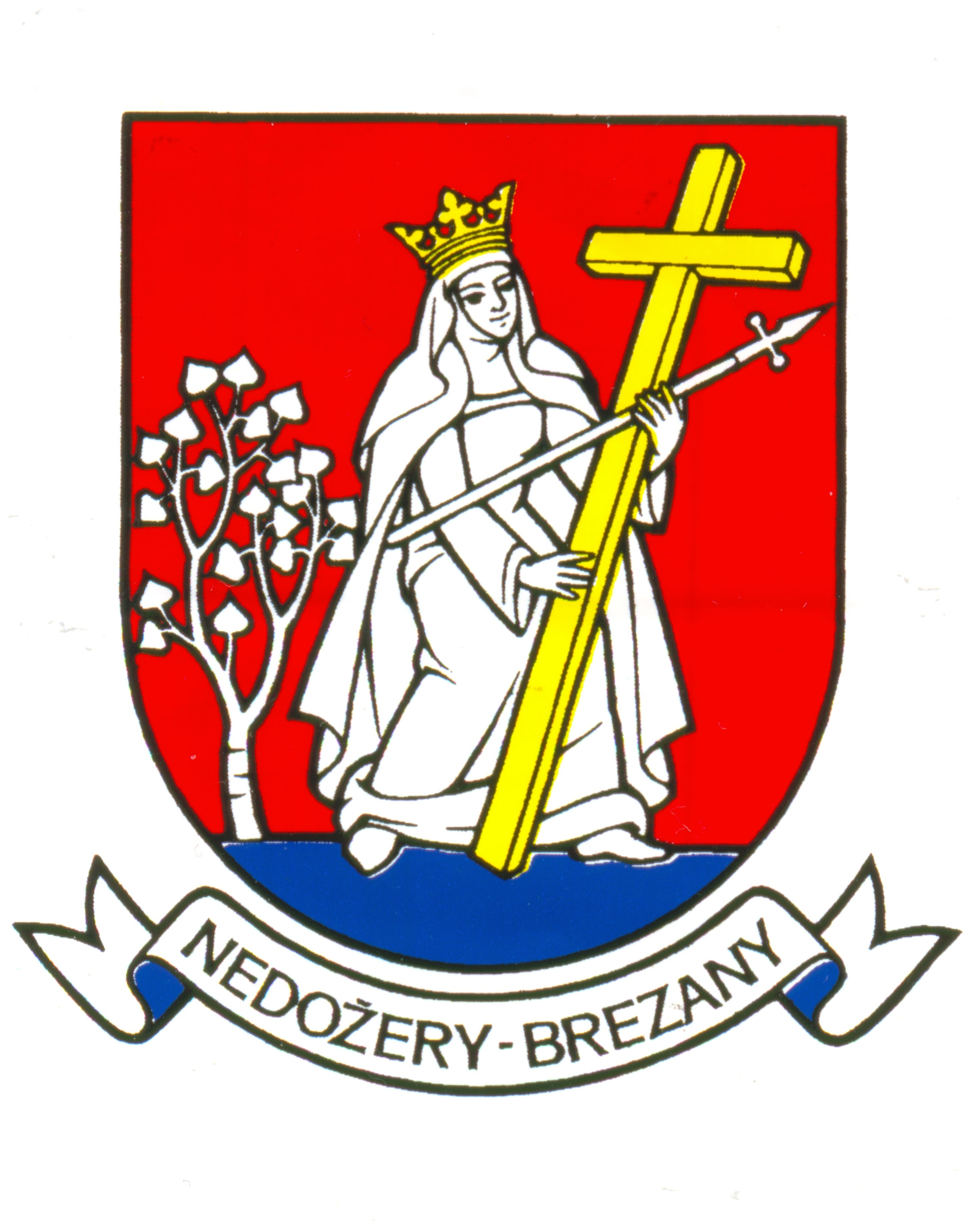
- Flag Coat of arms

- Location of Nedožery-Brezany in the Trenčín Region Location of Nedožery-Brezany in Slovakia
- Coordinates: 48.82°N 18.64°E
- Country: Slovakia
- Region: Trenčín Region
- District: Prievidza District
- First mentioned: 1429

Area
  - Total: 24.16 km^{2} (9.33 sq mi)
- Elevation: 296 m (971 ft)

Population (2025)
  - Total: 2,063
- Time zone: UTC+1 (CET)
  - Summer (DST): UTC+2 (CEST)
- Postal code: 972 12
- Area code: +421 46
- Vehicle registration plate (until 2022): PD
- Website: www.nedozery-brezany.sk

Nedožery-Brezany (Hungarian: Nádasérberzseny) is a village and municipality in Prievidza District in the Trenčín Region of western Slovakia.

== History ==
The town was founded in 1964 following the unification of two existing municipalities Nedožery and Brezany. In historical records the village Nedožery was first mentioned in 1429. Brezany was mentioned in 1430.

== Geography ==
The municipality lies at an altitude of 296 metres (971 ft) and covers an area of 24.16 km^{2} (9.33 sq mi) (2025).

== Population ==
Population statistic (10 years)
Year	1995	2005	2015	2025
Count	1839	1968	2116	2063
Difference		+7.01%	+7.52%	−2.50%

Population statistic
Year	2024	2025
Count	2054	2063
Difference		+0.43%

It has a population of 2063 people (31 December 2025).

=== Ethnicity ===
Census 2021 (1+ %)
Ethnicity	Number	Fraction
Slovak	2033	96.57%
Not found out	61	2.89%
Total	2105	

In year 2021 was 2105 people by ethnicity 2033 as Slovak, 61 as Not found out, 11 as Russian, 11 as Other, 7 as German, 6 as Czech, 4 as Romani, 3 as Rusyn, 3 as Hungarian, 2 as Polish, 2 as English, 1 as Irish, 1 as Vietnamese, 1 as Italian and 1 as Moravian.

Note on population: The difference values of population numbers in the table "Population statistic" and in the sections "Ethnicity" & "Religion" is caused by the use of various statistical methods.

=== Religion ===
Census 2021 (1+ %)
Religion	Number	Fraction
Roman Catholic Church	1226	58.24%
None	717	34.06%
Not found out	63	2.99%
Total	2105	

In year 2021 was 2105 people by religion 1226 from Roman Catholic Church, 717 from None, 63 from Not found out, 19 from Christian Congregations in Slovakia, 18 from Evangelical Church, 17 from Greek Catholic Church, 10 from Other and not ascertained christian church, 8 from Other, 7 from Eastern Orthodox Church, 6 from Jehovah's Witnesses, 6 from Ad hoc movements, 3 from Buddhism, 2 from Calvinist Church, 1 from Paganism and natural spirituality, 1 from Islam and 1 from Hinduism.
