= Siege of Székesfehérvár (1543) =

1543 Ottoman siege

- Part of the Habsburg–Ottoman war of 1540–1547
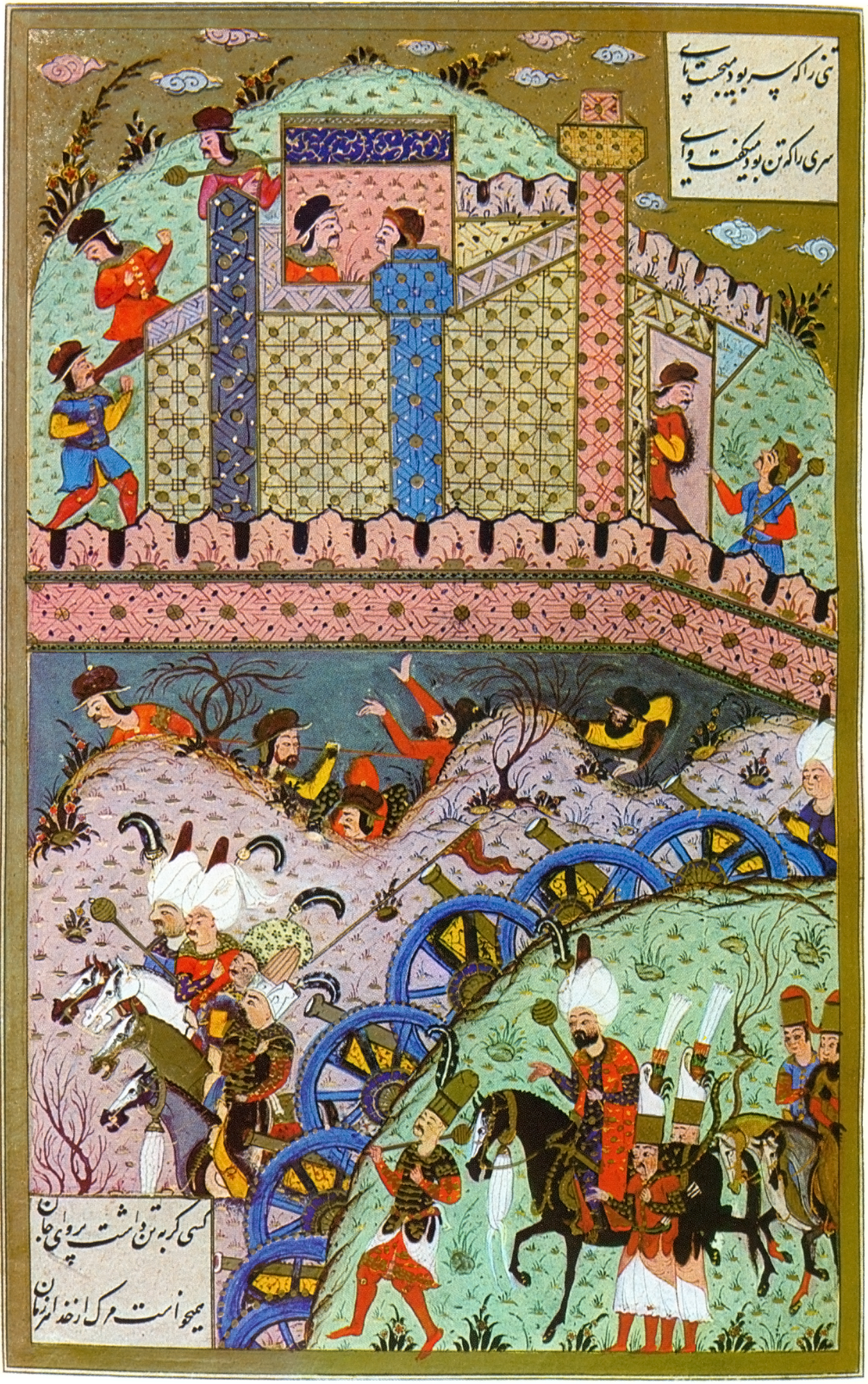
- Suleiman arriving at the siege of Székesfehérvár in 1543
Date	22 August – 3 September 1543
Location	Székesfehérvár, Hungary
Result	Ottoman victory
Territorial changes	Ottomans capture Székesfehérvár

Belligerents
Holy Roman Empire	Ottoman Empire

Commanders and leaders
Varkocs György †	Suleiman the Magnificent

Strength
6,000+	Unknown

The siege of Székesfehérvár started in the month of August in 1543 when the Ottomans laid siege to the fortress.

Székesfehérvár was a key fortification in the frontier area extending in the western foreground of Budin. In 1543 the garrison numbered 6,000 troops. On 22 August 1543 the Ottomans laid siege to the castle from three directions. On September 2 the Ottomans started a general attack against the fortress, they captured the outer castle. The next day the defenders in the inner castle surrendered to the Ottomans. It was turned into a sanjak of the province of Budin.

== Background ==
Székesfehérvár, the city where Hungarian kings were crowned, was a key fortification in the frontier area extending in the western foreground of Budin (Buda). During the civil war that broke out after the death of King Lajos (Louis), at the Battle of Mohács, in 1526, Székesfehérvár joined the side of János Zápolya and remained loyal until Zápolya's death on July 22, 1540. Afterwards, the city defected and joined the side of Ferdinand I of Habsburg. By 1543, the garrison of the important city numbered about 6,000 troops under the command of Habsburg captain György Varkocs.

== Sultan Suleiman's campaign ==
In 1543, Sultan Suleiman went on a major campaign into Hungary: his goal was to take two ancient cities: Székesfehérvár and Esztergom. From Edirne, he marched to Belgrade, then into Slavonia, where he took Valpovo, crossed the Drava River and during his march north, he took Siklós, Pécs, Máré, Szászvár, and Sióagárd. The Sultan continued his march north and, on July 26, besieged Esztergom, which he took on August 7. On August 8, Suleiman entered the castle and had the basilica inside the castle converted into a mosque. Ottoman forces left Esztergom on August 16, and marched south.

== Siege of Székesfehérvár ==
On August 20, 1543, the Ottoman army arrived at Székesfehérvár. By August 22, the city was besieged on three sides and, during the following week, battles were fought in the fields outside the city. While the Ottoman army besieged the city, Tatar raiders plundered and burned the region around the city. While the soldiers stood strong, later in the siege the civilian residents, fearing they might incur the wrath of the Ottomans for a lengthy siege, began to ask for surrender.

On September 2, the Ottomans started a general attack against the fortress. György Varkocs and his men launched a counter-attack against the siege army but were forced to retreat. Ottoman Chronicler Sinân Çavuş recorded that when Varkocs and his men returned to the gate, the leaders of the wealthy citizens inside the inner castle closed the gate. Varkocs' men shouted: “Open the gate quickly, because things have turned bad for us!” The civilians blocked the gate from within, raised the bridge, and answered the stranded soldiers: “The Türk is not scary; why are you afraid of the Türk? Go, fight with him and kill them all!” Surrounded, György Varkocs and his soldiers died a heroic death in front of the Budai gate bridge and the Ottomans captured the outer castle.

The following morning, on September 3, The residents in the inner castle surrendered to the Ottomans. Though the people of the city were given the right to leave safely with their possessions, residents that were responsible for the defection to the Habsburgs were executed for their betrayal. Also contrary to the terms of the surrender, Ulama Hân Beğ [tr], the sanjakbey (governor) of Bosnia, took many beautiful young men from Székesfehérvár and the castle of Tata as captives.

== Afterwards ==
On September 16, the Sultan's army left Székesfehérvár and arrived in Buda on September 21. From Buda, Suleyman marched to Varadin, then to Belgrade, and returned to Istanbul on November 16. The city of Székesfehérvár and region was made into a sanjak belonging to the eyalet (province) of Budin (Buda). On June 19, 1547, the Treaty of Istanbul was signed between the Archduchy of Austria and the Ottoman Empire. With the agreement, which included the Holy Roman Empire, Ferdinand and Charles V agreed to ensure that eastern Hungary was under the control of the Ottoman Empire and to give the Ottoman Empire 30,000 gold florins annually for western and northern Hungary held by the Habsburg Dynasty.
