= Fadhil =

Fadhil is a masculine given name and surname of Arabic origin. Notable people with the name include:

== Given name ==
- Fadhil Abdul-Majid (born 1935), Iraqi footballer
- Fadhil Assultani (born 1948), Iraqi poet and editor
- Fadhil Al Azzawi (born 1940), Iraqi poet and writer
- Fadhil Barrak (1942–1992), Iraqi intelligence officer
- Fadhil Barwari (1966–2018), Iraqi Army commander
- Fadhil Chalabi (1929–2019), Iraqi economist
- Fadhil Hashim (born 1983), Malaysian footballer
- Fadhil Idris (born 1996), Malaysian footballer
- Fadhil Abbas al-Ka'bi (born 1955), Iraqi author
- Fadhil al-Manasif, Saudi photographer and activist
- Fadhil al-Milani (1944-2024), Iraqi-Iranian academic, author, and community leader
- Fadhil Noh (born 1989), Singaporean footballer
- Fadhil Omer, Iraqi Kurdistan politician
- Fadhil Rassoul (1947–1989), Iraqi-Austrian academic
- Fadhil Salim (born 1983), Singaporean goalkeeper
- Fadhil Zonis (born 1997), Malaysian track cyclist

== Surname ==
- Abdullah Fadhil (1872–1958), British adventurer and businessman
- Mustafa Mohamed Fadhil (born 1976), Kenyan-Egyptian terrorist
- Syed Fadhil (born 1981), Singaporean footballer

== See also ==
- Fazl
