= List of military conflicts involving Hungary (1527–1700) =

This is a list of military conflicts in which Hungarian armed forces participated in or took place on the historical territory of Hungary.

By timeline:

- List of military conflicts involving Hungary (800–1300)
- List of military conflicts involving Hungary (1301–1526)
- List of military conflicts involving Hungary (1527–1700)
- List of military conflicts involving Hungary (1701–1900)
- List of military conflicts involving Hungary (1901–2000)
- List of military conflicts involving Hungary (2001–)

For major wars, see:

- List of wars involving Hungary

The list includes the name, date, Hungarian allies and enemies, and the result of each conflict, using the following legend:

Victory
Defeat
Result of civil or internal conflict
Treaty or peace without a clear result, status quo ante bellum, an unknown or indecisive result
Ongoing conflict

== Wars between 1526 and 1699 ==
Date	Conflict	Allies	Enemies	Result
1526–1538	Hungarian Civil War: Hungarian campaign of 1527–1528; German tidings of the campaign of Ferdinand I, in Hungary, 1527	Kingdom of Hungary; Habsburg monarchy	Ottoman Empire; Eastern Hungarian Kingdom	Inconclusive: Treaty of Nagyvárad; Hungary officially split into two parts; Ottomans gain influence in Eastern Hungary
1526–1527	Jovan Nenad uprising	Eastern Hungarian Kingdom	Serbs of Vojvodina	Hungarian victory
1532	Siege of Kőszeg / Güns Siege of Güns (Edward Schön)	Kingdom of Hungary; Kingdom of Croatia	Ottoman Empire	Hungarian victory: Captain Jurisics Miklós defended the small border fort of Kőszeg with only 700–800 men (46 soldiers, 700 peasants) with no cannons and few guns, preventing the advance of the 120,000–140,000 strong Turkish army towards Vienna.
1532	Battle of Leobersdorf Balkan Slavic Akindžije in Central Hungary, 16th century	Habsburg monarchy Kingdom of Hungary	Ottoman Empire; Moldavia	Habsburg victory: Kazim Bey's Ottoman army was completely destroyed.
1540–1547	Habsburg–Ottoman war	Kingdom of Hungary; Habsburg monarchy	Ottoman Empire; Eastern Hungarian Kingdom	Ottoman victory: Buda, Pest, Esztergom and most of central Hungary under Ottoman control; Szapolyai reduced to Eastern Hungary; Vienna forced to pay tribute
1543	Siege of Esztergom Siege of Esztergom, (painting by Sebastian Vrancks)	Kingdom of Hungary Habsburg monarchy	Ottoman Empire Kingdom of France	Ottoman victory: The city was captured by the Ottomans, led by Sultan Suleiman the Magnificent after two weeks.
1550–1558	Habsburg–Ottoman war	Kingdom of Hungary Habsburg monarchy	Ottoman Empire	Ottoman victory: Ottomans capture Temesvár, Szolnok, Veszprém, and Nógrád; Ottoman attack on Eger repelled by Hungarian defenders
1552	Siege of Eger The Women of Eger (painting by Bertalan Székely, 1867)	Kingdom of Hungary	Ottoman Empire	Hungarian victory
1562	First Székely uprising	Eastern Hungarian Kingdom	Székelys	Eastern Hungarian victory
1564–1565	Hungarian war of succession John Sigismund pays homage to the Ottoman Sultan Suleiman the Magnificent at Zemun on 29 June 1566.	Royal Hungary; Habsburg monarchy	Eastern Hungarian Kingdom; Zápolya family	Habsburg victory; Treaty of Szatmár (13 March 1565): John Sigismund Zápolya renounced his title of king of Hungary in favour of Maximilian II of Habsburg; He was recognised as prince of Transylvania under the Habsburg kings of Hungary; He agreed to marry Maximilian's sister Joanna.
1565–1568	Habsburg–Ottoman war	Kingdom of Hungary; Kingdom of Croatia	Ottoman Empire; Eastern Hungarian Kingdom	Ottoman victory: Ottomans capture Szigetvár; Death of Suleiman the Magnificent; Treaty of Adrianople
1566	Siege of Szigetvár Miklós IV Zrínyi's charge from the fortress of Szigetvár (painting by Johann Peter Krafft, 1825)	Kingdom of Hungary; Kingdom of Croatia	Ottoman Empire; Eastern Hungarian Kingdom	Ottoman victory: Suleiman the Magnificent dies in his tent before the final assault.; The whole Hungarian-Croatian army (2300–3000) is killed, Miklós IV Zrínyi is killed in the final battle.; Miklós IV Zrínyi ordered a fuse be lit to the powder magazine. After cutting down the last of the defenders the Ottoman Army entered the remains of Szigetvár and fell into the trap. 3,000 Turks perished in the explosion.; 20,000–30,000 Ottomans were killed.; Ottomans captured Szigetvár fortress and it became part of Budin Eyalet.
1575	Bekes uprising and the second Székely uprising	Principality of Transylvania	Kingdom of Hungary Székelys	Transylvanian victory
1575–1577	Danzig rebellion	Polish–Lithuanian Commonwealth; Principality of Transylvania	City of Gdańsk	Victory: The rebellion of the city of Danzig was a revolt from December 1575 to December 1577 of the city against the outcome of the 1576 Polish–Lithuanian royal election. The Polish throne was contested by Stephen Báthory and the Holy Roman Emperor Maximillian II.
1577–1583	Livonian campaign of Stephen Báthory	Polish–Lithuanian Commonwealth; Principality of Transylvania	Tsardom of Russia	Victory
1588	Battle of Szikszó	Kingdom of Hungary	Ottoman Empire	Hungarian victory
1593–1606	Fifteen Years' war Allegory of the Turkish war – The declaration of war before Constantinople	Kingdom of Hungary; Habsburg monarchy Principality of Transylvania Wallachia Moldavia	Ottoman Empire	Inconclusive: Peace of Zsitvatorok
1596	Third Székely uprising	Principality of Transylvania	Székelys	Transylvanian victory: Bloody Carnival
1595	Battle of Călugăreni Battle of Călugăreni by Theodor Aman	Wallachia; Principality of Transylvania	Ottoman Empire	Wallachian victory
1595	Battle of Giurgiu / Gyurgyevó Sinan Pasha crosses the Danube in 1595	Principality of Transylvania; Wallachia	Ottoman Empire	Hungarian victory
1596	Siege of Eger Siege of Eger in 1596 (Abraham Ortelius, 16th century)	Kingdom of Hungary; Habsburg monarchy	Ottoman Empire	Ottoman victory, Ottomans capture Eger
1604–1606	Bocskai's War of Independence Hungarian Prince of Transilvania Stephen Bocskay and his hajdú warriors	Habsburg monarchy	Hajduk Principality of Transylvania	Hungarian victory: Treaty of Vienna in 1606.; All constitutional and religious rights and privileges were granted to the Hungarians in both the Principality of Transylvania and Royal Hungary.; Stephen Bocskai was recognized as the Prince of Transylvania, and guaranteed the right of Transylvanians to elect their own independent princes in the future.; Preservation of an independent Transylvania, a potential base for the unification of Hungary.
1610–1611	Transylvanian Civil War	Principality of Transylvania Ottoman Empire	Wallachia Moldavia Transylvanian Saxons Kingdom of Hungary	Transylvanian (Báthory) victory
1612–1613	Ottoman–Transylvanian war	Principality of Transylvania (Báthorys) Habsburg monarchy: Kingdom of Hungary	Ottoman Empire Wallachia Moldavia	Ottoman victory: Gábor Báthory is replaced by Gábor Bethlen
1618–1648	Thirty Years' War	Habsburg Monarchy Spanish Empire Bavaria Catholic League	Principality of Transylvania Kingdom of Bohemia Swedish Empire France	Inconclusive
1632	Peasants revolt, led by Péter Császár (in Transylvania and in the Royal Hungary)	Principality of Transylvania Habsburg monarchy: Kingdom of Hungary	Peasants	Revolt crushed
1636	Transylvania Civil War	Principality of Transylvania: House of Rákóczi	Ottoman Empire: House of Bethlen	Transylvanian (Rákóczi) Victory
1652	Battle of Vezekény	Kingdom of Hungary	Ottoman Empire	Hungarian victory
1656–1657	Transylvanian military campaign against Poland	Swedish Empire; Principality of Transylvania	Poland–Lithuania	Polish-Tatar Victory
1657–1662	Ottoman–Transylvanian war	Principality of Transylvania	Ottoman Empire	Ottoman victory: Ottomans capture Nagyvárad
1663–1664	Austro-Turkish War	Habsburg monarchy: Kingdom of Hungary	Ottoman Empire	Ottoman victory: Peace of Vasvár
1663	Battle of Vízvár	Habsburg monarchy: Kingdom of Hungary	Ottoman Empire	Hungarian victory
1664	Siege of Léva Siege of Léva (17th century)	Habsburg monarchy: Kingdom of Hungary	Ottoman Empire	Habsburg – Hungarian victory: The victory was strategically important, it isolated Upper Hungary from any further Turkish incursions. But eventually even after the victory in the Battle of Saint Gotthard, Emperor Leopold I – to the outrage of Hungarian nobility – signed the unfavorable Peace of Vasvár.
1664	Battle of Saint Gotthard Battle of Saint Gotthard (17th century)	Habsburg monarchy: Kingdom of Hungary	Ottoman Empire	League victory
1678–1685	Thököly Uprising Arrest of Imre Thököly in 1685	Habsburg monarchy: Kingdom of Hungary	Principality of Upper Hungary	Habsburg victory
1683–1699	Great Turkish War	Habsburg monarchy: Kingdom of Hungary; Holy Roman Empire: Margraviate of Brandenburg; Electorate of Bavaria; Duchy of Lorraine; Electorate of Saxony	Ottoman Empire	Holy League victory
1686	Siege of Buda The recapture of Buda Castle in 1686 (painting by Gyula Benczúr, 1896)	Habsburg monarchy: Kingdom of Hungary; Holy Roman Empire: Margraviate of Brandenburg; Electorate of Bavaria; Duchy of Lorraine; Electorate of Saxony	Ottoman Empire	Holy League victory: As a consequence of the recapture of Buda from the Turks, as well as the victory in the Battle of Mohács (1687), the Hungarian parliament recognized at Pressburg in 1687 that the inheritance of the Hungarian crown had passed to the Habsburgs.
1697	Hegyalja uprising	Habsburg monarchy: Kingdom of Hungary	Kuruc	Habsburg victory: Rebellion crushed

== Sources ==
- Barta, Gábor; Granasztói, György (1981). "A három részre szakadt ország és a török kiűzése (1526–1605)". In Benda, Kálmán; Péter, Katalin (eds.). Magyarország történeti kronológiája, II: 1526–1848 [Historical Chronology of Hungary, Volume I: 1526–1848] (in Hungarian). Akadémiai Kiadó. pp. 361–430. ISBN 963-05-2662-X.
- (Appendix) Kokkonen, Andrej; Sundell, Anders (September 2017), Online supplementary appendix for "The King is Dead: Political Succession and War in Europe, 1000–1799" (PDF), Gothenburg: University of Gothenburg
