= List of military conflicts involving Hungary (2001–present) =

This is a list of military conflicts in which Hungarian armed forces participated in or took place on the historical territory of Hungary in the 21st century.

By timeline:

- List of military conflicts involving Hungary (800–1300)
- List of military conflicts involving Hungary (1301–1526)
- List of military conflicts involving Hungary (1527–1700)
- List of military conflicts involving Hungary (1701–1900)
- List of military conflicts involving Hungary (1901–2000)
- List of military conflicts involving Hungary (2001–)

For major wars, see:

- List of wars involving Hungary

The list includes the name, date, Hungarian allies and enemies, and the result of each conflict, using the following legend:

Victory
Defeat
Result of civil or internal conflict
Treaty or peace without a clear result, status quo ante bellum, an unknown or indecisive result
Ongoing conflict

== Wars in the 21st century ==
Conflict		Belligerents		Result	
Date	Name	Allies	Enemies	Outcome	Losses
March 2003 – 2009	Iraq War	MNF–I: United States; United Kingdom; Australia (2003–2009); Poland (2003–2008); Albania (2004–2008); Armenia (2005–2008); Azerbaijan (2004–2008); Bosnia and Herzegovina (2005–2008); Bulgaria (2004–2008); Czech Republic (2004–2008); Denmark (2004–2007); Dominican Republic (2004–2004); El Salvador(2004–2009); Estonia (2005–2009); Georgia (2004–2008); Honduras (2004–2004); Hungary (2004–2005); Iceland (2004-Unknown); Italy (2004–2006); Japan (2004–2008); Kazakhstan (2004–2008); Latvia (2004–2008); Lithuania (2004–2007); Macedonia (2004–2008); Moldova (2004–2008); Mongolia (2004–2008); Netherlands (2004–2005); New Zealand (2004–2004); Nicaragua (2004–2004); Norway (2004–2006); Philippines (2004–2004); Portugal (2004–2005); Romania(2004–2009); Singapore (2004–2008); Slovakia (2004–2007); South Korea (2004–2008); Spain (2004–2004); Thailand (2004–2004); Tonga (2004–2008); Ukraine (2004–2008); Iraqi National Congress; New Iraqi government: Iraqi Armed Forces; Awakening Council; Iraqi Kurdistan: Peshmerga	Ba'athist Iraq; Ansar al-Islam Supreme Command for Jihad and Liberation; Army of the Men of the Naqshbandi Order Sunni insurgents: Islamic State of Iraq; Islamic Army of Iraq; Ansar al-Sunnah; Shia insurgents: Mahdi Army; Special Groups; Asa'ib Ahl al-Haq; Others; For fighting between insurgent groups, see Civil war in Iraq (2006–07).	Victory: Invasion and occupation of Iraq; Overthrow of Ba'ath Party government and execution of Saddam Hussein; Iraqi insurgency, emergence of al-Qaeda in Iraq, and civil war; Subsequent depletion of al-Qaeda in Iraq, improvements in public security, Iraqi insurgency persists; Establishment of democratic elections and formation of new Shia led government; U.S.–Iraq Status of Forces Agreement; Escalation of sectarian insurgency after U.S. withdrawal and spillover with the Syrian Civil War; Resurgence of Islamic State of Iraq, the successor of al-Qaeda in Iraq,	1 soldier killed 12 wounded.
7 October 2001 – 30 August 2021	War in Afghanistan	ISAF; RS	Taliban; Al-Qaeda	Taliban Victory / US-allied defeat: United States invasion of Afghanistan (2001); Destruction of al-Qaeda and Taliban militant training camps (2001); Fall of the Taliban government (2001) and Establishment of the Islamic Republic of Afghanistan; Start of Taliban insurgency; Osama bin Laden killed by DEVGRU operators in Abbottabad, Pakistan in May 2011; "Afghanization" of Afghan conflict. Withdrawal of most US troops by 2014; End of Operation Enduring Freedom; start of 2015 phase of war, and Operation Freedom's Sentinel. End of US and ISAF led combat mission; beginning of NATO-led training and assistance mission.; Doha Agreement and progressive withdrawal of remaining US troops after 2020; Renewed Taliban offensive in 2021; Taliban forces capture Kabul on 15 August 2021 and overthrow the U.S.-backed Islamic Republic of Afghanistan; Re-establishment of the Taliban-run Islamic Emirate of Afghanistan; Panjshir Province held out against the Taliban for 3 weeks after Kabul was conquered but ended up also being conquered by the Taliban	7 soldiers killed 14 wounded.
