= List of military conflicts involving Hungary (1301–1526) =

This is a list of military conflicts in which Hungarian armed forces participated in or took place on the historical territory of Hungary.

By timeline:

- List of military conflicts involving Hungary (800–1300)
- List of military conflicts involving Hungary (1301–1526)
- List of military conflicts involving Hungary (1527–1700)
- List of military conflicts involving Hungary (1701–1900)
- List of military conflicts involving Hungary (1901–2000)
- List of military conflicts involving Hungary (2001–)

For major wars, see:

- List of wars involving Hungary

The list includes the name, date, Hungarian allies and enemies, and the result of each conflict, using the following legend:

Victory
Defeat
Result of civil or internal conflict
Treaty or peace without a clear result, status quo ante bellum, an unknown or indecisive result
Ongoing conflict

== Wars between 1301 and 1526 ==
Date	Conflict	Allies	Enemies	Result
1301–1308	Árpád war of succession, after the extinction of the Árpád dynasty	Charles Robert of Anjou; Duchy of Austria; Matthew III Csák's army László Kán's army	Kingdom of Bohemia; Duchy of Bavaria; Kőszegi Hungarian noble family	Angevin victory: Charles Robert of Anjou became Hungarian king
1310–1321	King Charles I's wars for the centralized power against the Hungarian aristocracy: Battle of Rozgony	Kingdom of Hungary; Order of Saint John; Zipser Saxons	Matthew III Csák; Aba dynasty Borsa family Apor family Kőszegi family	Royal victory: Centralization of the Hungarian Kingdom
1312	Battle of Rozgony Battle of Rozgony (Chronicon Pictum, 1358)	Kingdom of Hungary; Order of Saint John; Zipser Saxons	Aba dynasty Matthew III Csák	Decisive victory for King Charles I, weakening of the magnates
1319	Belgrade and Banate of Mačva	Charles I of Hungary	Kingdom of Serbia (medieval), Stefan Milutin	Victory for Charles I
1322–1337	Hungarian – Austrian War, restoration of the western borders, defeat of Austria, Kőszegi and Babonić families	Kingdom of Hungary	Duchy of Austria; Holy Roman Empire; Kőszegi family Babonić Croatian noble family	Hungarian victory
1321–1324	Hungarian–Serbian War	Kingdom of Hungary; Bosnia; Stephen Vladislav II of Syrmia	Kingdom of Serbia (medieval)	Hungarian defeat
1330	Battle of Posada Battle of Posada (Chronicon Pictum, 1358)	Kingdom of Hungary	Wallachia	Hungarian defeat: The Wallachian army led by Basarab, formed of cavalry, peasants and foot archers, ambushed and defeated the 30,000-strong Hungarian army, in a mountainous region
1344	King Louis the Great's invasion and occupation of Wallachia and Moldavia	Kingdom of Hungary	Wallachia; Moldavia	Hungarian victory, Wallachia and Moldavia became vassal states of King Louis the Great
1345–1358	Hungarian – Venetian War, Venice had to pay annual tribute to Louis. Venetians also had to raise the Angevin flag on Piazza San Marco.	Kingdom of Hungary	Republic of Venice	Decisive Hungarian victory Treaty of Zadar
1345	The campaign of King Louis I against the rebellious Croatian nobles The campaign of King Louis I against the rebellious Croatian nobles (Chronica Hungarorum, 1488)	Kingdom of Hungary	Croatian nobles	Hungarian victory
1345	Hungary's war with the Golden Horde	Kingdom of Hungary	Golden Horde	Hungarian victory: The Golden Horde was pushed back behind the Dniester River, the Golden Horde's control of the lands between the Eastern Carpathians and the Black Sea weakened; The establishment of Moldavia in 1346 as a Hungarian vassal state.
1347–1349, 1350–1352	Hungarian-Naples Wars The battle of Voivode Stephen Lackfi against Louis of Taranto around Naples (Chronica Hungarorum, 1488)	Kingdom of Hungary	Kingdom of Naples	First campaign: temporary Hungarian victory Second campaign: status quo ante bellum
1348	Battle of Capua	Kingdom of Hungary	Kingdom of Naples	Hungarian victory, occupation of the kingdom
1356–1359	Crusade against Francesco Ordelaffi	Pope Innocent VI Kingdom of Hungary	Francesco II Ordelaffi	Victory
1360–1369	Louis I's balcanic wars (against Serbia, Bulgaria, Wallachia and Bosnia)	Kingdom of Hungary	Serbian Empire Second Bulgarian Empire; Bosnia; Wallachia	Temporary Hungarian victories
1366–1367	Hungarian – Ottoman War	Kingdom of Hungary; Duchy of Savoya; Padua; Republic of Venice; Kingdom of France; Byzantine Empire	Ottoman Empire; Second Bulgarian Empire	Christian victory
1369	Wallachian campaign	Kingdom of Hungary	Wallachia	Hungarian victory
1372–1381	War of Chioggia, Hungary defeated the Venetians in several times, and finally expelled Venetians from Dalmatia, however Genoa, Padoa and Austria lost the War. The war resulted in the Treaty of Turin (1381)	Kingdom of Hungary Padua; Republic of Genoa; Duchy of Austria	Republic of Venice; Milan; Ottoman Empire; Kingdom of Cyprus	Hungarian victory, Venice had to pay annual tribute to King of Hungary
1375–1377	Hungarian–Ottoman War Victory of Louis the Great of Hungary against the Ottomans in Bulgaria (St. Lambert's Abbey, 1420)	Kingdom of Hungary Kingdom of Poland	Ottoman Empire; Second Bulgarian Empire	Hungarian victory
1377	Hungarian – Lithuanian war	Kingdom of Hungary	Grand Duchy of Lithuania	Hungarian victory, Louis I enters Vilnius
1384–1394	Civil war between a part of the Hungarian nobility and Mary, Queen of Hungary and Sigismund king	Kingdom of Hungary	Horváti family Kingdom of Naples	Sigismund's victory
1394–1395	Wallachian campaign	Kingdom of Hungary	Wallachia	Wallachia became a Hungarian vassal, Mircea I the Great accepted the lordship of King Sigismund without any fight.
1394–1395	Moldavian campaign	Kingdom of Hungary	Moldavia	Hungarian victory: Moldavia became a Hungarian vassal.; King Sigismund of Hungary occupied Suceava the capital of Stephen I of Moldavia.
1396	Battle of Nicopolis Battle of Nicopolis (painting by Sébastien Mamerot, 1472–1475)	Kingdom of Hungary; Holy Roman Empire; Kingdom of France; Knights Hospitaller; Duchy of Burgundy; Duchy of Savoy; Wallachia; Lands of the Bohemian Crown; Kingdom of Poland; Kingdom of Croatia; Swiss Confederacy; Kingdom of England; Republic of Venice; Republic of Genoa; Crown of Castile; Crown of Aragon; Kingdom of Navarre; Second Bulgarian Empire; Teutonic Order; Byzantine Empire	Ottoman Empire; Moravian Serbia	Crusader defeat: King Sigismund of Hungary had experience fighting with the Ottomans, but the French knights refused his battle plan. The French knights rushed to the Ottoman lines, while the other allies stayed with the Hungarian forces under King Sigismund, this caused confusion and divided the strength of the Crusader army.; Ottomans defeat Crusades and no new Anti-Ottoman alliance is formed till the 1440s.; Ottomans maintain pressure on Constantinople, tightened control over the Balkans, and became a greater threat to central Europe.; Collapse of Second Bulgarian Empire.
1407–1408	Bosnian campaign: Battle of Dobor	Kingdom of Hungary	Kingdom of Bosnia	Hungarian victory: King Sigismund achieved a decisive victory over Tvrtko II of Bosnia, 126 members of Bosnian nobility were massacred.; King Sigismund founded the Order of the Dragon as a celebration of the reoccupation of Bosnia and Dalmatia when he married Barbara of Cilli.
1411–1433	Hungarian – Venetian War	Kingdom of Hungary; Milan	Republic of Venice	Dalmatia became part of Venice
1412	Battle of Motta	Kingdom of Hungary	Republic of Venice	Venetian victory
1415–1419	Hungarian – Ottoman War	Kingdom of Hungary	Ottoman Empire	Stalemate
1419–1434	Hussite Wars Battle of King Sigismund and the Hussites (miniature by Eberhard Windeck, 1440–50)	Holy Roman Empire; Kingdom of Hungary Moderate Hussites (since 1423)	Hussites (mostly united until 1434) Radical Hussites (since 1434)	Victory of the moderate Hussites and Catholics over the radical Hussites.: Compromise between moderate Hussites and the Catholic Church; both join forces to fight the radical Hussites; The moderate Hussites are recognized by the Catholic Church and allowed to practice their own rite; The radical Hussites are defeated, and their rites forbidden; Sigismund of Luxembourg becomes King of Bohemia; The Basel Compacts, signed by Emperor Sigismund and Catholic and Hussite representatives, effectively end the Hussite Wars
1420–1432	War of the South Danube	Kingdom of Hungary; Wallachia; Grand Duchy of Lithuania	Ottoman Empire	Armistice
1420	Battle of Vítkov Hill	Holy Roman Empire; Kingdom of Hungary	Hussites	Hussite victory
1420	Battle of Vyšehrad	Holy Roman Empire; Kingdom of Hungary	Hussites	Hussite victory
1421	Battle of Kutná Hora	Holy Roman Empire; Kingdom of Hungary	Hussites	Hussite victory
1421	Battle of Nebovidy	Holy Roman Empire; Kingdom of Hungary	Hussites	Hussite victory
1422	Battle of Německý Brod	Holy Roman Empire; Kingdom of Hungary	Hussites	Hussite victory
1428	Siege of Golubac	Kingdom of Hungary	Ottoman Empire	Ottoman victory
1430	Battle of Trnava	Holy Roman Empire; Kingdom of Hungary	Hussites	Hussite victory
1431	Battle of Ilava	Kingdom of Hungary	Orphans	Hungarian-Royalists victory
1437	Raid on Kruševac	Kingdom of Hungary	Ottoman Empire	Hungarian victory
1437	Transylvanian peasant revolt of Budai Nagy Antal	Transylvanian aristocracy	Transylvanian peasants	Defeat of the rebels: Establishment of Unio Trium Nationum.
1437	Battle of Smederevo	Kingdom of Hungary	Ottoman Empire	Hungarian victory: Ali Bey suffered a defeat from the Hungarians in the summer of 1437 near Smederevo while the Hungarians were returning from their raid on Kruševac.
1438	Transylvanian campaign	Kingdom of Hungary	Ottoman Empire	Ottoman victory
1437–1442	Hungarian–Ottoman War	Kingdom of Hungary	Ottoman Empire	Hungarian victory
1440	Siege of Belgrade	Kingdom of Hungary	Ottoman Empire	Hungarian victory
1440–1442	Hungarian Civil War (1440–1442)	Supporters of King Vladislaus I; John Hunyadi; Nicholas Újlaki	Supporters of Elizabeth of Luxembourg and King Ladislaus V; Ulrich Cillei	Peace agreement, Vladislaus is accepted as Hungarian king: John Hunyadi and Nicholas Újlaki annihilated the troops of Vladislaus opponents at Bátaszék at the beginning of 1441. Their victory effectively put an end to the civil war.; The grateful king appointed Hunyadi and Újlaki joint Voivodes of Transylvania and Counts of the Székelys. Hunyadi was appointed as head of several southern counties of the Kingdom of Hungary, he assumed responsibility for the defense of the frontiers.
1441	Battle of Smederevo The battle of John Hunyadi in 1441 (Chronica Hungarorum, 1488)	Kingdom of Hungary	Ottoman Empire	Hungarian victory: Hunyadi began to make raids on the Ottoman countryside in Serbia and he defeated Ishak Bey, the commander of Smederovo.
1442	Battle of the Iron Gate (Szeben by older historiography) John Hunyadi is fighting with the Turks (lithography by József Marastoni, 19th century)	Kingdom of Hungary	Ottoman Empire	Hungarian victory: John Hunyadi marked his third victory over the Ottomans after the relief of Smederevo (1437) and the defeat of Ishak Beg midway between Semendria and Belgrade (1441).; When John Hunyadi defeated Mezid Bey and the raiding Ottoman army in the south part of the Kingdom of Hungary in Transylvania, Hunyadi chased the Ottomans beyond the Hungarian borders and the Hungarian army penetrated Wallachia at the Red Tower Pass, Hunyadi forced Voivode Vlad II Dracul to became again a Hungarian vassal. Later continuing his campaign, Hunyadi also forced the Moldavian voivodes Ilie and Stephen II, who until that time had recognized the authority of the Polish king, to renew their loyalty to the Hungarian king.
1442	Battle of the Ialomița (Iron Gate by older historiography) The battle of John Hunyad at the Iron Gate (Chronica Hungarorum, 1488)	Kingdom of Hungary	Ottoman Empire	Hungarian victory: According to contemporary sources, Ottoman army had 80,000 people, Hungarian army had 15,000 men. John Hunyadi defeated a large Ottoman army of Beylerbey Şehabeddin, the Provincial Governor of Rumelia.; This was the first time that a European army defeated such a large Ottoman force, composed not only of raiders, but of the provincial cavalry led by their own sanjak beys (governors) and accompanied by the formidable janissaries.; Hunyadi gained a huge booty. He put lots of treasures and weapons on a wagon that ten horses could hardly pull and sent it to King Vladislaus I of Hungary to Buda.
1443–1444	Long campaign The Long Campaign of John Hunyad against the Ottomans (Chronica Hungarorum, 1488)	Kingdom of Hungary	Ottoman Empire	Hungarian victory: Peace of Szeged
1443	Battle of Nish	Kingdom of Hungary; Kingdom of Poland; Serbian Despotate; Wallachia; Moldavia	Ottoman Empire	Crusader Victory
1443	Battle of Zlatitsa	Kingdom of Hungary; Kingdom of Poland; Serbian Despotate; Papal States	Ottoman Empire	Stalemate
1444	Battle of Kunovica John Hunyadi, Regent-Governor of the Kingdom of Hungary and General of Hungarian army (17th century)	Kingdom of Hungary; Kingdom of Poland; Serbian Despotate	Ottoman Empire	Crusader Victory
1444	Battle of Varna King Władysław III of Poland / Vladislaus I of Hungary in the Battle of Varna (painting by Jan Matejko, 1879)	Kingdom of Hungary; Kingdom of Poland; Kingdom of Croatia; Grand Duchy of Lithuania; Crown of Bohemia; Wallachia; Bulgarian rebels Kingdom of Bosnia; Papal States; Teutonic Knights	Ottoman Empire	Crusader defeat: Vladislaus I of Hungary, the young king, ignoring Hunyadi's advice, rushed 500 of his Polish knights against the Ottoman center. They attempted to overrun the Janissary infantry and take Murad II prisoner, and almost succeeded, but in front of Murad's tent Vladislaus's horse either fell, and the king was slain.; Murad's casualties at Varna were so heavy, it was not until three days later that he realized he was victorious.; The Ottoman victory in Varna, followed by the Ottoman victory in the Second Battle of Kosovo in 1448, deterred the European states from sending any substantial military assistance to the Byzantines during the Ottoman Siege of Constantinople in 1453.
1447	Wallachian campaign	Kingdom of Hungary	Wallachia; Ottoman Empire	Hungarian victory: John Hunyadi deprived Vlad II Dracul from the Wallachian throne, because Vlad II Dracul captured Hunyadi after the Battle of Varna.; Hunyadi placed Vladislav II on the throne of Wallachia.; Hunyadi also drove a small Ottoman army out of Wallachia.
1448	Second Battle of Kosovo / Rigómező An akinji is dragging an incapacitated Hungarian knight (Süleymanname, 16th century)	Kingdom of Hungary; Wallachia	Ottoman Empire; Wallachia (Switched to the Ottoman side on the third day of the battle)	Ottoman victory
1454	Battle of Kruševac	Kingdom of Hungary Serbian Despotate	Ottoman Empire	Hungarian victory: The Ottoman Sultan, Mehmed II invaded Serbia in May 1454 and laid siege to Smederevo, thus violating the truce of November 1451 between his empire and Hungary. John Hunyadi decided to intervene and started to assemble his armies at Belgrade, forcing the Sultan to lift the siege and leave Serbia in August. However, an Ottoman force of 32,000 strong continued to pillage Serbia up until Hunyadi routed them at Kruševac on 29 September.; He made a raid against the Ottoman Empire and destroyed Vidin before returning to Belgrade.
1456	Siege of Belgrade / Nándorfehérvár The self-sacrifice of Titusz Dugovics (painting by Sándor Wagner, 1853)	Kingdom of Hungary	Ottoman Empire	Hungarian victory: The Siege of Belgrade was a major issue for the entire Europe, especially after the fall of Constantinople in 1453. The fall of the fortress city of Belgrade would have opened the gates of Europe to the Turks and that would have certainly changed the history of the world.; The Battle of Belgrade deserves to be remembered. Hungarians played a key role in the defense of Europe against the invasion of the Turks in the 15th century.; Pope Callixtus III ordered the bells of every European church to be rung every day at noon, as a call for believers to pray for the defenders of the city. But because in many European countries the news of victory arrived before the Pope's order for prayer, the ringing of the church bells was believed to be in celebration of the victory. Therefore, the significance of the church bells ringing is now the commemoration of Hunyadi's victory against the Turks.; Plague broke out in the camp, from which John Hunyadi himself died three weeks later.
1458	Ottoman–Wallachian War	Wallachia Hungarian mercenaries	Ottoman Empire	Wallachian victory: Vlad the Impaler reportedly defeated an Ottoman force led by Mahmud Pasha. His 5,000-strong army, including Hungarian mercenaries, ambushed the Ottoman troops near the Danube, killing half of their reported 18,000 soldiers.
1458–1459	Matthias I's war with Ján Jiskra	Kingdom of Hungary	Jiskra's soldiers	Royal victory
1458–1465	War in Bosnia	Kingdom of Hungary	Ottoman Empire	Partial Bosnian territory occupied by the Ottoman Empire.
1460	Battle of Pozazin	Troops of Michael Szilágyi	Ottoman raiding army of Ali Bey Mihaloğlu	Ottoman victory: The Ottomans lured the small advancing army of Michael Szilágyi into a trap at Pozazin. Michael Szilágyi was being captured by Ali Bey Mihaloğlu. Michael Szilágyi was transferred to Constantinople, he was decapitated by the orders of the Sultan.
1464	Siege of Jajce	Kingdom of Hungary	Ottoman Empire	Hungarian victory
1465–1471	Hussite uprising in North-Hungary	Kingdom of Hungary	Czech hussite rebels	Hungarian victory
1467	Hungarian - Moldavian war: Battle of Baia / Moldvabánya	Kingdom of Hungary	Moldavia	Both side claimed victory
1468–1478	Bohemian War (1468–1478)	Kingdom of Hungary	Kingdom of Bohemia	Treaty of Olmütz, Matthias became king of Bohemia
1471	Hungarian – Polish war. King Matthias I forced King Casimir IV to withdraw from Hungary	Kingdom of Hungary	Kingdom of Poland	Hungarian victory
1471–1476	Matthias's intervention in the Moldovian – Ottoman War	Kingdom of Hungary; Moldavia	Ottoman Empire	After initial Hungarian-moldavian victories Hungary stopped the advocating of Moldavia, so Stephen III moldavian ruler became vasal of the Ottoman Empire.
1474	Siege of Wrocław / Breslau / Boroszló	Kingdom of Hungary	Kingdom of Poland; Kingdom of Bohemia	Between 1469 and 1490, Wrocław was part of the Kingdom of Hungary. In 1474, the city was besieged by combined Polish–Czech forces. Kings Casimir IV of Poland, his son Vladislaus II of Bohemia, and Matthias Corvinus of Hungary met in the nearby village, and a ceasefire was signed according to which the city remained under Hungarian rule.
1475	Battle of Vaslui	Moldavia Kingdom of Hungary; Kingdom of Poland	Ottoman Empire; Wallachia	Moldavian–Hungarian–Polish victory
1476	Siege of Šabac / Szabács	Kingdom of Hungary	Ottoman Empire	King Matthias besieged and seized Šabac, an important Ottoman border fort
1479	Battle of Breadfield / Kenyérmező Battle of Breadfield (Colorized lithography from Eduard Gurk after Ion Osolsobie, 19th century)	Kingdom of Hungary	Ottoman Empire; Wallachia	Hungarian victory: Hungary defeats the highly outnumbered Ottoman army in Transylvania. Ottoman casualties were extremely high. The battle was the most significant victory for the Hungarians against the raiding Ottomans, and as a result, the Ottoman Turks did not attack southern Hungary and Transylvania for many years thereafter.
1480–1481	Battle of Otranto	Kingdom of Hungary; Kingdom of Naples; Crown of Aragon; Kingdom of Sicily; Papal States	Ottoman Empire	Christian victory
1482–1488	Austrian – Hungarian War	Kingdom of Hungary	Holy Roman Empire	Decisive Hungarian victory: At the end of the campaign, Hungary controlled all of Upper Austria as well, which remained under the control of King Matthias until his death, in 1490.
1482	Siege of Hainburg	Kingdom of Hungary	Holy Roman Empire	Holy Roman Empire victory: First siege
1482	Siege of Hainburg	Kingdom of Hungary	Holy Roman Empire	Hungarian victory: Second siege
1484	Battle of Leitzersdorf	Kingdom of Hungary	Holy Roman Empire	Hungarian victory
1485	Siege of Vienna / Bécs The triumphant Matthias (painting by Gyula Benczúr, 1919)	Kingdom of Hungary	Holy Roman Empire	Hungarian victory: The Black Army captures Vienna. The city is then merged into Hungary from 1485 to 1490. where Matthias moved his royal court.
1486	Siege of Retz	Kingdom of Hungary	Holy Roman Empire	Hungarian victory
1486–1487	Siege of Wiener Neustadt / Bécsújhely	Kingdom of Hungary	Holy Roman Empire	Hungarian victory: City surrenders; Austria ceded the western lands of Lower Austria, Styria and Carinthia to the Kingdom of Hungary.
1490–1491	War of the Hungarian Succession	Kingdom of Hungary; Kingdom of Bohemia	Kingdom of Poland	Treaty
1490	Battle of Bonefield	The supporters of John Corvinus	The supporters of Beatrice of Naples	The supporters of Beatrice of Naples, Stephen Báthory and Paul Kinizsi defeated John Corvinus.
1491–1495	Hungarian – Ottoman war	Kingdom of Hungary	Ottoman Empire	Stalemate
1492–1493	The Black Army's uprising	Kingdom of Hungary	Black Army	Destruction of the Black Army
1497	Battle of the Cosmin Forest	Moldavia Kingdom of Hungary	Kingdom of Poland	Moldavian victory
1499–1504	Hungarian – Ottoman war	Kingdom of Hungary	Ottoman Empire	Stalemate
1512–1520	Hungarian – Ottoman war	Kingdom of Hungary	Ottoman Empire	Successful defensive operations against the Ottomans
1514	Peasants revolt, led by György Dózsa The execution of György Dózsa (Stephanus Taurinus: Stauromachia, id est, Cruciatorum servile bellum, 1519)	Kingdom of Hungary	Peasants	Revolt suppressed: Royal power declined in favour of the magnates, who used their power to curtail the peasants' freedom. Gyorgy led a revolt but was eventually caught, tortured, and executed and became known as a martyr or a dangerous criminal.
1520–1526	Hungarian-Ottoman War	Kingdom of Hungary	Ottoman Empire	Hungarian defeat
1523	Battle of Szávaszentdemeter	Kingdom of Hungary	Ottoman Empire	Hungarian victory
1526	Battle of Mohács Discovering the Body of King Louis II of Hungary (painting by Bertalan Székely, 1860)	Kingdom of Hungary	Ottoman Empire	Hungarian defeat: Decisive downward turning point in Hungarian history.; Destruction of the Kingdom of Hungary as an independent and powerful European nation.; The territory of Hungary was split into two parts in 1529 and into three parts in 1541.; Around two hundred years of constant warfare with and between two empires, Habsburg and Ottoman, turned Hungary into a perpetual battlefield. The countryside was regularly ravaged by armies moving back and forth devastating the population.

== Sources ==
- Babinger, Franz (1978). Mehmed the Conqueror and His Time. Princeton University Press. ISBN 0-691-09900-6.
- Engel, Pál (2001). The Realm of St Stephen: A History of Medieval Hungary, 895–1526. I.B. Tauris Publishers. ISBN 1-86064-061-3.
- Jefferson, John (2012). The Holy Wars of King Wladislas and Sultan Murad: The Ottoman-Christian Conflict from 1438–1444. Leiden: Brill Publishers. ISBN 978-90-04-21904-5.
- Mureşanu, Camil (2001). John Hunyadi: Defender of Christendom. The Center for Romanian Studies. ISBN 973-9432-18-2.
- Teke, Zsuzsa (1980). Hunyadi János és kora [John Hunyadi and his Times] (in Hungarian). Gondolat. ISBN 963-280-951-3.
