= List of military conflicts involving Hungary (800–1300) =

This is a list of military conflicts in which Hungarian armed forces participated in or took place on the historical territory of Hungary.

By timeline:

- List of military conflicts involving Hungary (800–1300)
- List of military conflicts involving Hungary (1301–1526)
- List of military conflicts involving Hungary (1527–1700)
- List of military conflicts involving Hungary (1701–1900)
- List of military conflicts involving Hungary (1901–2000)
- List of military conflicts involving Hungary (2001–)

For major wars, see:

- List of wars involving Hungary

The list includes the name, date, Hungarian allies and enemies, and the result of each conflict, using the following legend:

Victory
Defeat
Result of civil or internal conflict
Treaty or peace without a clear result, status quo ante bellum, an unknown or indecisive result
Ongoing conflict

== Wars under the Árpád dynasty's rule ==
Date	Conflict	Allies	Enemies	Result
~800–970	Hungarian invasions of Europe Hungarian invasions of Europe in the 9–10th century	Hungarian Tribes	Kingdom of Italy; East Francia; West Francia; Middle Francia; Great Moravia; Byzantine Empire; Al-Andalus; First Bulgarian Empire; Principality of Serbia	More than a century of raids and decisive wars: Between 899 and 970, according to contemporary sources, the researchers count 47 (38 to West and 9 to East) raids in different parts of Europe. From these campaigns only 8 were unsuccessful and the others ended with success.; Many tributes were paid to the Hungarians.; Many times the rulers of Europe hired the Hungarian warriors against each other.; The most significant result of the Battle of Pressburg is that the Hungarians secured their lands in 907, prevented a future German invasion, the Germans did not attack Hungarian land until 1030.; The Hungarians also used a preemptive war against the Germans and the German unification.; A Hungarian army was defeated in German land at the Battle of Lechfeld in 955. Seven years later Otto I was rewarded for stopping the Hungarians and he was crowned Emperor by Pope John XII in 962 and the Holy Roman Empire (962–1806) was established.; The Hungarian military presence stabilized the Hungarian state in the Carpathian Basin.
811	Battle of Pliska The Battle of Pliska (Manasses Chronicle, 12th century)	First Bulgarian Empire; Hungarian Tribes; Avar mercenaries	Byzantine Empire	Decisive Bulgarian victory: The Hungarians were in alliance with Krum of Bulgaria against Emperor Nikephoros.
~830	Hungarian – Khazar War	Hungarian Tribes	Khazars	Hungarian victory
862–895	Hungarian conquest of the Carpathian Basin Hungarian conquest of the Carpathian Basin (painting by Mihály Munkácsy, 1893)	Hungarian Tribes	East Francia; Great Moravia; First Bulgarian Empire	Hungarian conquest of the Carpathian Basin: Foundation of Grand Principality of Hungary in the Carpathian Basin.
894–896	Byzantine–Bulgarian war of 894–896	Byzantine Empire; Magyars	Bulgarian Empire; Pechenegs	Bulgarian victory: Bulgaria's status as most favoured nation restored; Eastern Roman Empire pays annual tax tribute to Bulgaria; Bulgaria's status as most dominant Eastern European nation retained; Bulgarian territorial gains in Thrace Magyars forced to migrate westwards and settle in Pannonia
895	Campaign of Kiev The Hungarians at Kiev (painting by Pál Vágó, 1885)	Hungarian Tribes	Kievan Rus'	Hungarian victory
899	Battle of Brenta Hungarian mounted archer shooting a knight who chases him (fresco in Basilica of Aquileia, 12th century)	Principality of Hungary	Kingdom of Italy	Hungarian victory: Almost all the army of Berengar I of Italy was annihilated.; The Hungarian invasion resulted in the burning of many cities, like Feltre, Vercelli, Modena and monasteries like the monastery in Nonantola and attacking even Venice.; Berengar I of Italy accepts to pay tribute. He started to pay to the Hungarian tribute regularly, and until his death in 924, and in exchange the Hungarians helped him against every enemies that he had. The Hungarians became Berengar's friends.; The returning Hungarian army had a role also in the conquering of Pannonia, as part of the Hungarian conquest of the Carpathian Basin, from the Bavarians by the Hungarians in late 900.
901	Carinthian campaign: Battle of Laibach	Principality of Hungary	East Francia; Duchy of Carinthia	Hungarian victory: Both sides suffered a heavy casualties at the Battle of Laibach, Duke Eberhard and Duke Gottfried died.; After the battle, Hungarian raid to Carinthia, Carniola, Styria.
907	Battle of Pressburg / Pozsony: Battle of Ennsburg; Battle of Regensburg; Battle of Lengenfeld; Battle of Pressburg (painting by Peter Johann Nepomuk Geiger, 1850)	Principality of Hungary	East Francia; Duchy of Bavaria	Decisive Hungarian victory: After the Battle of Pressburg the victorious Hungarians defeated other Bavarian armies at Ennsburg, Regensburg, Lengenfeld.; The most significant result of the Battle of Pressburg is that the Hungarians secured the lands they gained during the Hungarian conquest of the Carpathian Basin, and prevented a future German invasion, the Germans did not attack Hungary until 1030.; This battle is considered one of the most significant battles in the history of Hungary. The Hungarian victory forced the new Bavarian prince, Luitpold's son, Arnulf to conclude a peace treaty, the prince recognized the loss of Pannonia and Ostmark, pushing Hungary's borders deep in Bavarian territory, the river Enns became borderline, paid tribute, and agreed to let the Hungarian armies, which went to war against Germany or other countries in Western Europe, to pass through the duchies lands.; The establishment of the future Kingdom of Hungary.
908	Battle of Eisenach Hungarian horse archers, a detail of the Arrival of the Hungarians (Feszty Panorama) (painting by Árpád Feszty, 1894)	Principality of Hungary	East Francia	Hungarian victory: A crushing victory by a Hungarian army over an East Frankish army composed of troops from Franconia, Saxony, and Thuringia.; After this victory the Hungarian campaigns against the German duchies continued until 910, the battles of Augsburg and Rednitz, ended with disastrous German defeats, after which the German king Louis the Child concluded peace with the Principality of Hungary, accepting to pay tribute to the latter, and recognizing the Hungarian territorial gains during the war.
910	Battle of Lechfeld / Augsburg	Principality of Hungary	East Francia; Swabia	Hungarian victory: On 12 June 910, it was an important victory by a Hungarian army over the combined forces of East Francia and Swabia under the nominal command of Louis the Child.; After the battle, the victorius Hungarians broke into Franconia for the first time, where they won another victory on 22 June in the Battle of Rednitz.
910	Battle of Rednitz	Principality of Hungary	East Francia; Duchy of Franconia; Duchy of Lotharingia; Duchy of Bavaria	Hungarian victory: 10 days after the battle Battle of Lechfeld, on 22 June 910, the same Hungarian army entered Franconia, and defeated a united army of the duchies of Franconia, Lotharingia and Bavaria in the Battle of Rednitz.; The Bavarian, Frankish, Swabian and Saxonian duchies became taxpayers of the Hungarians. As consequence of this victory, in the next year, Hungarian attacks launched from the Carpathian Basin crossed the Rhine for the first time in 911.
917	Battle of Achelous The Bulgarian victory at Anchelous (13th century)	First Bulgarian Empire Principality of Hungary; Pechenegs	Byzantine Empire	Bulgarian victory: Hungarian troops are helping Simeon I of Bulgaria to defeat the Byzantines in the great Battle of Acheloos.
919	Battle of Püchen	Principality of Hungary	East Francia	Hungarian victory
925	Battle of Drava River	Principality of Hungary	Duchy of Croatia	Croatian victory
933	Battle of Merseburg / Riade Henry the Fowler fights against the Hungarians, (Sächsische Weltchronik, 1270)	Principality of Hungary	East Francia	German victory
934	Battle of W.l.n.d.r Hungarian warriors in Bulgaria (Chronicon Pictum, 1358)	Principality of Hungary; Pechenegs; Muslim auxiliary troops	Byzantine Empire; First Bulgarian Empire; Muslims converted to Christianity	Decisive Hungarian – Pecheneg victory
942	Battle of Fraxinet	Principality of Hungary	Muslims	Hungarian victory
942	Hungarian raid in Spain	Principality of Hungary	Caliphate of Córdoba: Upper March of Al-Andalus; Catalan Counties	Hungarian victory
955	Battle of Lechfeld / Augsburg Miniature of the story of Lehel's Horn (Chronicon Pictum, 1358)	Principality of Hungary	Kingdom of Germany; Duchy of Saxony; Duchy of Thuringia; Duchy of Bavaria; Duchy of Swabia; Duchy of Bohemia	Hungarian defeat: Despite the German victory, the German losses were heavy, among them many nobles: Conrad, Duke of Lorraine, etc.; Bulcsú, Lehel, and Sur are hanged in Regensburg.; Upon destruction of the Hungarian forces, the German army proclaimed Otto I father of the fatherland and emperor. In 962, on the strength of this, Otto I went to Rome and had himself crowned Holy Roman Emperor by Pope John XII.; End of the Hungarian invasions towards the West.
960	Battle of Drina (Its existence is questionable)	Principality of Hungary	Principality of Serbia	Serbian victory: Hungarian leader named Kisa was defeated by Časlav, the Prince of Serbia.
960	Battle of Syrmia (Its existence is questionable) Illustration of Časlav being thrown into the Sava by the Hungarians (19th century)	Principality of Hungary	Principality of Serbia	Hungarian victory: A Hungarian army defeated Časlav, the Prince of Serbia by avenge of the widow of Kisa.
970	Battle of Arcadiopolis	Principality of Hungary; Kievan Rus'; First Bulgarian Empire; Pechenegs	Byzantine Empire	Byzantine victory: End of the Hungarian invasions of Europe.
984	Hungarian – German border conflict at Melk Leopold the Illustrious fighting the Hungarians and defending Melk (Babenberger Stammbaum, 1489–1492)	Principality of Hungary	Margraviate of Austria	Hungarian defeat: The Hungarians supported Henry II, Duke of Bavaria against Otto II, Holy Roman Emperor, thus the Hungarians raided several times the territories of Piligrim, Bishop of Passau from the fortress of Melk.; Leopold I, Margrave of Austria launched a counter-attack and besieged and occupied Melk, which forced Géza, Grand Prince of Hungary to withdraw Hungarian forces from the territories west of the Vienna Woods and Khalenberg.; Later, Géza, Grand Prince of Hungary renounced the lands west of the river Leitha in his peace treaty of 996 with Henry IV of Bavaria. The river Leitha became the historic border between the Kingdom of Hungary and the Holy Roman Empire.
997	Koppány's revolt The execution of Koppány (Chronicon Pictum, 1358)	Principality of Hungary; Holy Roman Empire	Koppány's Army	Koppány's defeat
1002	King Stephen I's military campaign against Gyula of Transylvania King Saint Stephen of Hungary captures his uncle Gyula, the ruler of Transylvania (Chronicon Pictum, 1358)	Hungarian Royal Army	Gyula III of Transylvania	Successful campaign of King Saint Stephen of Hungary: "Gyula" meant the second highest title in Hungarian tribal confederation. Gyula's ancestor was among the seven chieftains of the conquering Hungarians, who finally settled in Transylvania. Gyula's family ruled Transylvania in Gyulafehérvár (Alba Iulia). Gyula II was baptised in Constantinople around 952.; After the coronation King Stephen I asserted his claim to rule all lands dominated by Hungarian lords.; King Stephen I personally led his army against his maternal uncle, and Gyula III surrendered without a fight, Gyula III and his family was captured.; Transylvania was incorporated with the Kingdom of Hungary.; The establishment of the Roman Catholic Diocese of Transylvania in 1009.
1008 (?), 1029 (?)	King Stephen I's military campaign against Ajtony, a tribal leader in the Banat	Kingdom of Hungary	Ajtony's Army	Successful campaign, Ajtony's defeat
1017–1018	Hungarian – Polish war	Kingdom of Hungary	Duchy of Poland	Stalemate
~1018	Pecheneg attack against Hungary	Kingdom of Hungary	Pecheneg tribes	Hungarian victory
1018	Hungarian – Bulgarian War King Saint Stephen of Hungary defeats Kean "Duke of the Bulgarians and Slavs" (Chronicon Pictum, 1358)	Kingdom of Hungary; Byzantine Empire	First Bulgarian Empire	Hungarian – Byzantine victory
1018	The intervention of Boleslaw the Brave, Duke of Poland in the Kievan succession crisis: Battle of the River Bug	Duchy of Poland; Kingdom of Hungary; Holy Roman Empire; Pechenegs	Kievan Rus'	Temporary victory for Sviatopolk and Bolesław, Polish sack of Kiev
1030–1031	German–Hungarian War	Kingdom of Hungary	Holy Roman Empire	Hungarian victory: Military campaign of Emperor Conrad II's against Hungary; The Holy Roman Empire fails to subjugate Hungary; The Hungarians occupied Vienna.; Hungary is granted the lands between the rivers Leitha and Fischa
1041	Uprising against King Peter Orseolo King Peter is driven away by Samuel Aba (Chronicon Pictum, 1358)	Hungarian Army	Hungarian nobles	Suppression of King Peter
1042–1043	German – Hungarian wars	Kingdom of Hungary	Holy Roman Empire	Hungarian defeat
1044	Henry III's military campaign against Hungary: Battle of Ménfő; Battle of Ménfő, on the right side of the picture Emperor Henry III gives thanks for victory, on the left a soldier executes King Samuel Aba (Chronicon Pictum, 1358)	The army of King Samuel Aba	Holy Roman Empire; Peter Orseolo and his allies	Defeat of Samuel Aba, restoration of Peter
1046	War between King Peter and Prince Andrew The blinding of King Peter, Prince Andrew takes the Hungarian crown (Chronicon Pictum, 1358)	King Peter's army Holy Roman Empire	Prince Andrew's army Kievan Rus'	Hungarian victory
1046	Vata pagan uprising Pagans slaughtering priests and the martyrdom of Bishop Gerard of Csanád (Anjou Legendarium, 1330)	King Peter, later King Andrew I	Paganic rebels	Prince Andrew's victory: During this rebellion, Vata gained power over a group of rebels who wished to abolish Christian rule and revert to paganism.; Bishop Gerard of Csanád invited Vazul's exiled sons to the country.; Prince Andrew and Levente returned to Hungary from their exile and quickly gained popular support for the throne, especially among the pagan populace, despite the fact that Andrew was Christian (Levente had remained pagan). On their return, a rebellion began, which Andrew and Levente initially supported. The princes accepted the claims of the rebels in exchange for fighting against King Peter.; King Peter decided to flee from Hungary and take refuge in Austria. Andrew's envoys tricked the king before he reached the frontier. King Peter fled to a fortified manor at Zámoly, but his opponents captured him. King Peter was blinded, which caused his death.; The pagans slaughtered priests and Bishop Gerard of Csanád.; Prince Andrew pronounced himself king.; King Andrew soon broke with his pagan supporters, restored Christianity and declared pagan rites illegal.
1051–1052: 1051	Emperor Henry III's military campaigns against Hungary: Battle of Vértes	Kingdom of Hungary	Holy Roman Empire; Duchy of Bohemia	Hungarian victory
1052	Siege of Pozsony The destruction of Emperor Henry III ships at the Castle of Pozsony (Chronicon Pictum, 1358)	Kingdom of Hungary	Holy Roman Empire	Hungarian victory: German Emperor Henry III undertook a fifth campaign against the Kingdom of Hungary, and besieged Pozsony without success, as the Hungarians sank his supply ships on the Danube river.
1056–1058	German – Hungarian border war	Kingdom of Hungary	Holy Roman Empire	Stalemate, treaty of Marchfeld
1060	Civil war between King Andrew I and his brother, Prince Béla: Battle of Moson	King Andrew I's army Holy Roman Empire	Prince Béla's army Kingdom of Poland	Prince Béla's victory
1061	Second paganic uprising	Hungarian army	Paganic rebels	Uprising suppressed
1063	German invasion of Hungary	Kingdom of Hungary	Holy Roman Empire	Hungarian defeat
1067	Croatian campaign	Kingdom of Hungary	Duchy of Carinthia	Hungarian victory: King Solomon of Hungary and Prince Géza of Hungary helped to his brother-in-law to Demetrius Zvonimir of Croatia to recapture Dalmatia from the Carinthians.
1068	Hungarian – Bohemian war	Kingdom of Hungary	Holy Roman Empire; Duchy of Bohemia	King Solomon of Hungary occupies Bohemia
1068	Pecheneg attack against Hungary: Battle of Kerlés / Cserhalom; Saint Ladislaus is fighting a duel with a Cuman warrior who kidnapped a girl (Chronicon Pictum, 1358)	Kingdom of Hungary	Pechenegs; Ouzes	Hungarian victory
1071–1072	Hungarian – Byzantine war: Siege of Belgrade; King Solomon and Prince Géza receive gifts from the locals at Niš (Chronicon Pictum, 1358)	Kingdom of Hungary	Byzantine Empire; Pechenegs	Hungarian victory: Pecheneg troops pillaged Syrmia in 1071. The king and the duke suspected that the soldiers of the Byzantine garrison at Belgrade incited the marauders against Hungary, they decided to attack the fortress.; The Hungarian army crossed the river Sava, although the Byzantines used Greek fire against their boats. The Hungarians defeated the Pechenegs who helped the Byzantines to relief the siege. Finally the Hungarians took Belgrade after a siege of three months.; King Solomon and Prince Géza marched along the valley of the river Great Morava as far as Niš. The Hungarians seized the Byzantine city without any resistance.
1074	Battle of Kemej Battle of Kemej (Chronicon Pictum, 1358)	King Solomon's army	Prince Géza's army	Internal conflict between Solomon, King of Hungary and his cousin Duke Géza, took place on 26 February 1074 near Kemej in present-day Heves County. As a result of a betrayal, Géza was defeated, but he managed to flee from the advancing and overwhelming royal army.
1074	Civil war between King Solomon and his cousins Géza and Ladislaus: Battle of Mogyoród; Battle of Mogyoród (Chronicon Pictum, 1358)	King Solomon's army Holy Roman Empire; Duchy of Bohemia	Prince Géza's army Prince Ladislaus's army Prince Otto's army	Prince Géza and Ladislaus defeat the armies of King Solomon and Emperor Henry IV. King Solomon was dethroned.
1075	Henry IV's military campaign against Hungary The Escape of King Solomon (Chronicon Pictum, 1358)	Kingdom of Hungary	Holy Roman Empire Solomon's army	Hungarian victory
The Campaigns of King Ladislaus I (1079–1095)
1079	Henry IV's military campaign against King Saint Ladislaus	Kingdom of Hungary	Holy Roman Empire	Hungarian victory
1085	Cuman attack against Hungary King Saint Ladislaus, the knight-king (fresco in the church of Székelyderzs, 1419)	Kingdom of Hungary	Cuman tribes Solomon's army	Hungarian victory: King Saint Ladislaus planned to make peace and an agreement with Solomon, the former king of Hungary, but Solomon soon began conspiring against Ladislaus, and Ladislaus imprisoned him.; The first five Hungarian saints, including the first king of Hungary, Stephen I, and Stephen's son, Emeric, were canonized during Ladislaus's reign. Ladislaus released Solomon at the time of the ceremony. After his release, Solomon made a final effort to regain his crown. He persuaded a Cuman chieftain, Kutesk, to invade Hungary. Solomon promised Kutesk, that he would give him the right of possession over the province of Transylvania and would take his daughter as wife. King Ladislaus defeated the invaders.; At the head of a large contingent Solomon joined a huge army of Cumans and Pechenegs who invaded the Byzantine Empire in 1087. The Byzantines routed the invaders, Solomon seems to have died fighting in the battlefield.
1091	Hungarian occupation of Croatia King Saint Ladislaus of Hungary crosses the river Drava to conquer Croatia (painting by Bertalan Székely, 19th century)	Kingdom of Hungary	Kingdom of Croatia	Hungarian victory: King Demetrius Zvonimir of Croatia was a member of the House of Trpimirović, he married Helen of Hungary from the Árpád dynasty in 1063. Helen was a Hungarian princess, daughter of King Béla I of Hungary, and sister to King Ladislaus I of Hungary. There was no living male member of the House of Trpimirović in 1091, civil war broke out in Croatia.; The widow of King Zvonimir, Helen tried to keep her power in Croatia during the succession crisis. Several Dalmatian cities and Croatian nobles around Helen asked King Ladislaus I to help Helen and offered him the Croatian throne, which was seen as rightfully his by inheritance rights.; In 1091 Ladislaus I crossed the Drava river and conquered the entire province of Slavonia without encountering opposition, Ladislaus I had success in his campaign, yet he wasn't able to establish his control over entire Croatia.; Ladislaus I appointed his nephew Prince Álmos to administer the controlled area of Croatia, established the Diocese of Zagreb as a symbol of his new authority and went back to Hungary.; Petar Snačić rose up against the Hungarian rule between 1093 and 1097.
1091	Cuman attack against Hungary Saint Ladislaus is chasing and fighting a duel with a Cuman warrior (Chronica Hungarorum, 1488)	Kingdom of Hungary	Cuman tribes	Hungarian victory: The Cumans invaded and plundered Hungary leading by chieftain Kapolcs, they broke first in Transylvania, then the territory between the Danube and Tisza rivers. The Cumans tried to leave Hungary with their huge booty and prisoners, but King Ladislaus I reached and defeated them near the Temes river.; King Ladislaus I offered the Christianity for the Cuman survivors, the majority of them accepted, thus the king settled them in Jászság, in the Kingdom of Hungary.
1091	Battle near Severin / Szörényvár against the Cumans	Kingdom of Hungary	Cuman tribes	Hungarian victory: The rumor of the losing battle reached the Cuman camp, the Cumans threatened King Ladislaus I with revenge and demanded to free the Cuman prisoners.; King Ladislaus I marched to the Hungarian border to prevent the next invasion. The two army clashed near Severin / Szörényvár, the Hungarian army was victorious, King Ladislaus killed Ákos, the Cuman chieftain.
1092	Ruthenian campaign by King Saint Ladislaus The Ruthenians pledge allegiance to King Saint Ladislaus (Chronicon Pictum, 1358)	Kingdom of Hungary	Kievan Rus'	Hungarian victory: King Ladislaus I blamed the Ruthenians for the invasion of the Cumans, he stated the Cumans were incited by them. In retaliation, Ladislaus I invaded the neighboring Rus' principalities, forcing the Ruthenians to ask "for mercy" and to promise "that they would be faithful to him in all things".
1094	King Ladislaus I's intervention in a Polish conflict Siege of Kraków (Chronicon Pictum, 1358)	Kingdom of Hungary	Kingdom of Poland	Hungarian victory: Władysław I Herman, Duke of Poland was a cousin of King Ladislaus I of Hungary. King Ladislaus I's intervented in a conflict between Władysław I Herman, Duke of Poland, and the duke's illegitimate son, Zbigniew.; King Ladislaus I marched to Poland and captured Herman's younger son, Boleslaus.; The Hungarian troops captured Kraków during Ladislaus' campaign.; At Ladislaus' demand, Władysław I Herman declared Zbigniew his legitimate son.
The Campaigns of King Coloman (1095–1116)
1095	Campaign in Apulia	Kingdom of Hungary; Republic of Venice	Principality of Taranto	Hungarian victory: When King Coloman of Hungary seized Croatia, Vitale I Michiel, Doge of Venice asked an ally against the Normans who threatened the Dalmatian cities. A huge Hungarian army was transported to Apulia by the Venetian navy, they defeated the Normans, the Hungarians captured Brindisi and Monopoli, thus the Normans was retreated from Dalmatia. The Hungarian army plundered the land and retreated after three months leaving the cities in the hand of the Venetians.
1096	King Coloman's defensive operations against the different armies of the crusaders King Coloman's meeting with Godfrey of Bouillon (13th century)	Kingdom of Hungary	French and German crusaders	Hungarian victories: The first group of crusaders was led by Walter Sans Avoir with 150,000 troops. King Coloman received them in a friendly way and allowed them into the kingdom. They proceeded through Hungary without any major conflicts, the only incident occurred near the Hungarian–Byzantine border at Zimony.; The next group was headed by Peter the Hermit with 40,000 troops. King Coloman permitted them to enter Hungary only after Peter pledged that he would prevent them from pillaging the countryside, but Peter could not keep his promise, the crusaders plundered and raped locals. They reached Zimony, where they learned of the story of the previous conflict. The crusaders besieged and took the town, where they massacred many thousand Hungarians. They only withdrew when Coloman's troops approached them.; The third band of crusaders was led by Folkmar with 12,000 men reached Nyitra and when they saw the richness of the countryside they began plundering the region. These were soon routed by the local Hungarians.; A fourth army that came to Moson was led by Gottschalk with 15,000 men. They camped near Pannonhalma, to seize food and wine, the crusaders made frequent pillaging raids against the nearby settlements. King Coloman attacked and massacred the majority of them. The crusader mob of Gottschalk fled with 3,000 men from Hungary.; Following these incidents, King Coloman forbade the crusaders who arrived under the leadership of Count Emicho with 200,000 men to enter Hungary. The crusaders besieged Moson, their catapults destroyed the walls in two places, enabling them to storm into the fortress. King Coloman defended the fortress. After six weeks the morale of the crusader mob began to fail, which inspired the Hungarians, a panic broke out among the attackers that enabled the garrison to carry out a sortie and rout them, and most of the mob was slaughtered or drowned in the river.; The first crusader army organized by the Holy See was led by Godfrey of Bouillon with 80,000 troops. King Coloman agreed to meet with Godfrey in Sopron. The king allowed the crusaders to march through his kingdom but stipulated that Godfrey's younger brother Baldwin and his family should stay with him as hostages. The crusaders passed through Hungary peacefully along the right bank of the Danube, King Coloman and his army followed them on the left bank. He only released his hostages after all the crusaders had crossed the river Sava. The uneventful march of the main crusader army across Hungary established Coloman's good reputation throughout Europe.
1096	Occupation of Biograd na Moru / Tengerfehérvár	Kingdom of Hungary	Kingdom of Croatia	Hungarian occupation of Biograd na Moru: During the campaign of Apulia, an agreement was made with the Doge of Venice, that part of Dalmatia up to Zadar / Zára would remain in the possession of Venice, King Coloman of Hungary occupied the part further south.
1097	Battle of Gvozd Mountain Death of the Last Croatian King (painting by Oton Iveković, 1894)	Kingdom of Hungary	Kingdom of Croatia	Decisive Hungarian victory: Petar Snačić was elected king by Croatian feudal lords in 1093. Petar's seat of power was based in Knin. Petar Snačić's rose up against the Hungarian rule between 1093 and 1097.; King Ladislaus I of Hungary died in 1095, leaving his nephew King Coloman of Hungary to continue the Croatian campaign. Coloman, as was the case with Ladislaus I before him, wasn't seen as a conqueror but rather as a pretender to the Croatian throne.; Coloman assembled a large army to press his claim on the throne and in 1097 defeated King Petar's troops in the Battle of Gvozd Mountain, who was killed in battle.; King Coloman was crowned in Biograd na Moru in 1102 and the title now claimed by Coloman was "King of Hungary, Dalmatia, and Croatia".; King Coloman created a personal union between the kingdoms of Hungary and Croatia (1102–1918).
1099	King Coloman's war against the Kievan Rus'	Kingdom of Hungary	David Igorevich's army Cuman tribes	Hungarian defeat: Grand Prince Sviatopolk II of Kiev sent his son Iaroslav – who was the husband of one of Coloman's nieces – to Hungary to seek assistance against the princes of the westernmost regions of Kievan Rus' in 1099.; This was a favorable opportunity for the intervention, like King Ladislaus I of Hungary, King Coloman of Hungary was very angry with Vasylko of Terebovlia and Volodar of Przemyśl, because they always let Cuman troops through their principalities that raided the northern parts of Hungary for the purpose of robbery, which were always joined also Russians.; King Coloman and his army crossed the Carpathian Mountains and laid siege to Przemyśl, the seat of Volodar, one of the rebellious princes. David Igorevich, one of Volodar's allies, persuaded the Cumans to attack the Hungarians. The Cumans used Cuman namely old Hungarian warfare, in the ensuing battle, the Hungarian army was defeated. The Chronicon Pictum says that "The bloodshed there was so great that the Hungarians rarely suffered such a great defeat."
1105	Siege of Zara and occupation of Dalmatia	Kingdom of Hungary	Dalmatian cities Republic of Venice	Hungarian victory
1107	Campaign in Apulia	Kingdom of Hungary; Byzantine Empire; Republic of Venice	Principality of Taranto	Hungarian victory: Bohemond I, Prince of Taranto and Antioch attacked the Byzantine Empire with a huge Norman army from Southern Italy. Alexios I Komnenos defended his country at the east side of the Adriatic Sea, meantime he asked Hungarian and Venetian aid. The Venetian navy transported the Hungarian army to Apulia and the Hungarians devastated the land of Bohemond I and they captured Brindisi and Monopoli. In the beginning of the next year the Hungarians went home and left the cities in the hand of the Venetians like during the campaign of 1095.; Treaty of Devol.
1108	Hungarian war with the Holy Roman Empire	Kingdom of Hungary	Holy Roman Empire; Duchy of Bohemia	Hungarian victory
1115–1119	Hungarian – Venetian wars	Kingdom of Hungary	Republic of Venice	Hungarian defeat
1123	Stephen II's intervention in the Kievan Rus' internal conflict	Kingdom of Hungary Iaroslav from Vladimir	Kievan Rus'	Hungarian retreat
1124–1125	Hungarian – Venetian war	Kingdom of Hungary	Republic of Venice	Hungarian defeat
1127–1129	Byzantine-Hungarian War (1127–29)	Kingdom of Hungary; Grand Principality of Serbia	Byzantine Empire	Stalemate, peace agreement
1132	Hungarian – Polish war	Kingdom of Hungary; Duchy of Austria	Kingdom of Poland	Hungarian victory
1136–1137	Béla II's balcanic campaigns (against Venice and the Byzantine Empire)	Kingdom of Hungary	Byzantine Empire; Republic of Venice	Hungarian victory
1146	Battle of the Fischa The Battle of the Fischa (Chronica Hungarorum, 1488)	Kingdom of Hungary	Duchy of Bavaria; Duchy of Austria	Hungarian victory
1149–1152	Géza II's intervention in the conflict between the Principality of Halych and Kievan Rus'	Kingdom of Hungary; Kievan Rus'	Principality of Halych	Peace agreement
1149–1155	Hungarian – Byzantine wars	Kingdom of Hungary; Grand Principality of Serbia	Byzantine Empire	Ceasefire
1154	Siege of Braničevo	Kingdom of Hungary; Cumans	Byzantine Empire	Abandoned siege, Hungarian retreat
1162–1165	Hungarian civil war between Stephen III and his uncles Ladislaus and Stephen	Kingdom of Hungary; Holy Roman Empire	Ladislaus and Stephen's army Byzantine Empire	Stephen III's victory
1167	Battle of Sirmium	Kingdom of Hungary; Banate of Bosnia	Byzantine Empire; Serbian Grand Principality	Decisive Byzantine victory, Hungary lost Dalmatia
1168	Hungarian – Bohemian war	Kingdom of Hungary	Holy Roman Empire; Duchy of Bohemia	Hungarian victory
1176	Battle of Myriokephalon	Byzantine Empire; Kingdom of Hungary; Principality of Antioch; Grand Principality of Serbia	Sultanate of Rum	Seljuk victory: Military balance maintained.; The Hungarian auxiliary troops were commanded by Palatine Ampud, and Leustach Rátót, Voivode of Transylvania sent by King Béla III of Hungary to fight along the Byzantines against the Seljuks.
1180–1185	Hungarian – Byzantine war	Kingdom of Hungary Grand Principality of Serbia (1183–1185)	Byzantine Empire	Hungarian victory, Hungary reoccupied Dalmatia
1188–1189	King Béla III's military campaign against Halych	Kingdom of Hungary	Principality of Halych	Hungarian victory, occupation of Halych
1190	Battle of Iconium	Holy Roman Empire; Kingdom of Hungary	Sultanate of Rum	Crusader victory: Main Seljuk army routed.; Sultanate of Rum's capital city sacked.; Géza, Prince of Hungary, the younger brother of King Béla III joined by a contingent of 2,000 men to Frederick Barbarossa to participate in the Third Crusade.; About 5,000 Imperials and Hungarians under Duke Frederick joined the Siege of Acre in October.
1192–1193	Attack of the Hungarian King Bela III on the Grand Principality of Serbia	Kingdom of Hungary	Grand Principality of Serbia Byzantine Empire	Defeat: Hungarian invasion of the Grand Principality of Serbia prompted the intervention of Isaac II Angelos against the invaders; Retreat of the Hungarian army; Stefan Nemanja preserves his throne and state
1198	Attack of Andrew II of Hungary on Hum	Kingdom of Hungary	Grand Principality of Serbia	Inconclusive: Duke Andrew II of Hungary invades Hum, then part of the Grand Principality of Serbia, occupies a part of it temporarily, but then loses it; Hum remains a part of the Grand Principality of Serbia
1197–1203	Brothers' quarrel, civil war between King Emeric and his brother Andrew Emeric captures his rebellious younger brother Andrew (painting by Mór Than, 1857)	Emeric's army	Andrew's army	1197 (Andrew's victory); 1199 (Emeric's victory); 1203 (Emeric's victory)
1201–1205	Emeric's balcanic wars	Kingdom of Hungary	Second Bulgarian Empire; Grand Principality of Serbia Bosnia	Hungarian victories
1202	Siege of Zara The crusaders conquering the City of Zara in 1202 (painting by Andrea Vicentino, 16th century)	Kingdom of Hungary; Kingdom of Croatia	Soldiers of the Fourth Crusade; Republic of Venice	Hungarian defeat: Venetians and Crusaders sacked the city
1213–1214, 1219, 1233–1234	King Andrew II's military campaigns against Halych	Kingdom of Hungary	Principality of Halych	Hungarian defeat
1217–1218	King Andrew II's participation in the Fifth Crusade: Battle of Bethsaida; King Andrew II at the head of his crusader army (Chronicon Pictum, 1358)	Kingdom of Hungary; Duchy of Austria; Latin Empire of Constantinople	Ayyubids	Hungarian victories on the battlefields. Muslim forces retreated to their fortresses and towns.
1225	King Andrew II expels the Teutonic Knights from Transylvania, the order had to move to Poland	Kingdom of Hungary	Teutonic Knights	Hungarian victory
1237–1241	Bosnian Crusade The Hungarian successes were followed by quick Hungarian retreat because of the Mongol invasion of Hungary	Coloman of Galicia-Lodomeria	"Heretics" within the Banate of Bosnia	Stalemate after the quick Hungarian retreat due to the Mongol attacks
1241	Battle of Mohi	Kingdom of Hungary	Mongols	Hungarian defeat
1241–1242	First Mongol invasion of Hungary	Kingdom of Hungary	Mongols	Mongol victory at the Battle of Mohi. Mongols retreated within a year from Hungary due to the local Hungarian withstand. Both sides suffered a heavy casualties.
1242	Siege of Esztergom	Kingdom of Hungary	Mongols	Hungarian victory
1242	Battle of Grobnik Field	Kingdom of Hungary; Kingdom of Croatia	Mongols	Hungarian – Croatian victory
1242	King Béla IV's punishing campaign against Frederick II, Duke of Austria	Kingdom of Hungary	Duchy of Austria	Hungarian victory
1243	Siege of Zara	Kingdom of Hungary	Republic of Venice	Hungarian defeat
1246	Battle of the Leitha River	Kingdom of Hungary	Duchy of Austria	Hungarian defeat
1250–1278	Hungarian – Bohemian wars	Kingdom of Hungary; Holy Roman Empire	Kingdom of Bohemia; Duchy of Austria	Bohemian defeat
1259	Battle of Pelagonia	Empire of Nicaea; Cuman cavalry Hungarian mounted archers Turkish cavalry Serbian horsemen German knights	Despotate of Epirus; Principality of Achaea; Duchy of Athens; Duchy of the Archipelago; Triarchy of Negroponte; Kingdom of Sicily	Decisive Nicaean victory
1260	Battle of Kressenbrunn The Battle of Kressenbrunn (Chronica Hungarorum, 1488)	Kingdom of Hungary; Kingdom of Croatia; Kingdom of Poland; Principality of Halych	Kingdom of Bohemia Margraviate of Moravia; Duchy of Austria; Duchy of Styria; Duchy of Silesia; Duchy of Carinthia	Bohemian victory
1261–1262	Occupation of Konstantin Tih's Bulgarian Empire by King Béla IV.	Kingdom of Hungary	Second Bulgarian Empire	Hungarian victory
1264–1265	Internal conflict between King Béla IV and his son, Stephen: Battle of Isaszeg	King Béla IV's army	Duke Stephen's army	Stephen's victory, he got eastern Hungary as a duchy
1268	Mačva War Béla IV 's army captures Stefan Uroš I. Their conflict was solved with dynastic marriage.	Béla IV of Hungary	Kingdom of Serbia (medieval), Stefan Uroš I	Hungarian victory
1272–1279	Feudal anarchy	King Ladislaus IV; Csák noble family	Kőszegi noble family Gutkeled noble family	Royal victory
1277	Stefan Dragutin – Stefan Uroš I conflict	Stefan Dragutin; Kingdom of Hungary	Kingdom of Serbia (medieval) Stefan Uroš I	Hungarian victory
1277	Hungary's war with Litovoi in Cumania	Kingdom of Hungary	Litovoi's army	Hungarian victory
1278	Battle on the Marchfeld, at Dürnkrut and Jedenspeigen Battle on the Marchfeld (painting by Anton Petter, 1858)	Kingdom of Hungary; Duchy of Austria; Kingdom of Germany; Burgraviate of Nuremberg	Czech lands Duchy of Głogów; Duchy of Lower Bavaria; Duchy of Silesia	Decisive Hungarian – German victory: Death of Ottokar II of Bohemia.; Rudolph I of Habsburg got the Austrian throne.; Decisive event for the history of Central Europe for the following centuries. The battle marked the beginning of the ascendancy of the House of Habsburg in Austria and Central Europe.
1282	Cumanic uprising: Battle of Lake Hód	Kingdom of Hungary	Cumanic tribes	Hungarian victory
1285–1286	Second Mongol invasion of Hungary Mongols in Hungary in 1285 (Chronicon Pictum, 1358)	Kingdom of Hungary	Golden Horde	Decisive Hungarian victory
1287–1288	Third Mongol invasion of Poland	Kingdom of Poland; Kingdom of Hungary	Golden Horde; Kingdom of Galicia–Volhynia	Polish – Hungarian victory
1288	Battle of Stary Sącz	Kingdom of Poland; Kingdom of Hungary	Golden Horde	Polish – Hungarian victory
1291	German – Hungarian war	Kingdom of Hungary	Holy Roman Empire	Hungarian victory
1290–1301	Croato–Hungarian war of succession after the death of king Ladislaus IV of Hungary and Croatia	Árpád dynasty Šubić family	House of Anjou; Kőszegi family	Indecisive: Árpáds were winning militarily, but Andrew III's death in 1301 extinguished the Árpád dynasty and triggered the Árpád war of succession in Hungary (1301–1308); Paul I Šubić of Bribir became de facto independent ruler of Croatia
1298	Battle of Göllheim	Duchy of Austria; Kingdom of Bohemia; Kingdom of Hungary	County of Nassau; Electoral Palatinate	Habsburg victory

== Sources ==
- Bowlus, Charles R. (2016). The Battle of Lechfeld and its Aftermath, August 955: The End of the Age of Migrations in the Latin West. London: Routledge. doi:10.4324/9781315241142. ISBN 978-1-351-89417-3. OCLC 965444179.
- Fine, John V. A. (1994). The Late Medieval Balkans: A Critical Survey from the Late Twelfth Century to the Ottoman Conquest. The University of Michigan Press. ISBN 0-472-08260-4.
- Madgearu, Alexandru (2017). The Asanids: The Political and Military History of the Second Bulgarian Empire, 1185–1280. BRILL. ISBN 978-9-004-32501-2.
- Nagy, Kálmán (2007). A honfoglalás korának hadtörténete [Military History of the Age of the Hungarian Conquest] (in Hungarian). Budapest: Heraldika Kiadó.
