= List of military conflicts involving Hungary (1901–2000) =

This is a list of military conflicts in which Hungarian armed forces participated in or took place on the historical territory of Hungary from 1901 to 2000.

By timeline:

- List of military conflicts involving Hungary (800–1300)
- List of military conflicts involving Hungary (1301–1526)
- List of military conflicts involving Hungary (1527–1700)
- List of military conflicts involving Hungary (1701–1900)
- List of military conflicts involving Hungary (1901–2000)
- List of military conflicts involving Hungary (2001–)

For major wars, see:

- List of wars involving Hungary

The list includes the name, date, Hungarian allies and enemies, and the result of each conflict, using the following legend:

Victory
Defeat
Result of civil or internal conflict
Treaty or peace without a clear result, status quo ante bellum, an unknown or indecisive result
Ongoing conflict

== Wars in the 20th century ==
Conflict		Belligerents		Result
Date	Name	Allies	Enemies	Outcome
28 July 1914 – 11 November 1918	World War I Austro-Hungarian mountain corps in Tyrol	Central Powers; Austria-Hungary; German Empire; Ottoman Empire; Bulgaria	Allied Powers; France; British Empire; Russian Empire (1914–17) Kingdom of Serbia; Kingdom of Montenegro; Belgium; Japan; Italy (from 1915); Portugal (from 1916); Romania (from 1916); Greece (from 1917) (Thailand) Siam (from 1917) Co-belligerents; Hejaz (from 1916); United States (from 1917); Brazil (from 1917)	Defeat: Collapse of the Austro-Hungarian Empire and creation of the First Hungarian Republic; Beginning of Revolutions and interventions in Hungary (1918–1920); Treaty of Trianon; Loss of two-thirds of pre-war Hungarian territory
December 1918 – June 1919	Hungarian–Czechoslovak War Hungarian Red Army in Kassa, 1919.	First Hungarian Republic Hungarian Soviet Republic Slovak Soviet Republic	Czechoslovakia	Military Victory Political Defeat: Hungarian advance into Czechoslovakia, then withdraw after negotiations; Creation and dissolution of the Slovak Soviet Republic
13 November 1918 – 3 August 1919	Hungarian–Romanian War Romanian cavalry march through Budapest, 1919.	Hungarian Soviet Republic	Romania	Defeat: Collapse of the Hungarian Soviet Republic; Romanian occupation of Hungary proceeds
6 May 1919	Bruck an der Leitha raid	Hungarian Soviet Republic German-Austria	Antibolsevista Comité	ABC raid defeated
2-6 June 1919	Hungarian invasion of Prekmurje	Hungarian Soviet Republic	Republic of Prekmurje	Victory: Soviet rule restored in Prekmurje
24 June 1919	Ludovika Uprising	Hungarian Soviet Republic	White Hungarians	Rebellion crushed
3 August – 13 October 1921	Uprising in West Hungary Hungarian Freecorps in Burgenland, 1921.	Austria; Hungary (disarmament of the rebels in 1921)	Rongyos Gárda; Lajtabánság; Bosnian and Albanian Muslim volunteers	Victory: Referendum called; Sopron and its area remained in Hungary
20 - 23 October 1921	Charles IV's second attempt Charles IV and Queen Zita in Sopron during the March on Budapest.	Hungary	Habsburg Royalists	Charles' restoration fails; Habsburgs dethroned
15 – 18 March 1939	Hungarian invasion of Carpatho-Ukraine Hungarian gendarme stands in front of a LT-35 tank destroyed near Fanchykovo.	Hungary	Carpatho-Ukraine	Victory: Occupation and annexation of Carpatho-Ukraine
23 – 31 March 1939	Slovak-Hungarian War Hungarian and Slovak servicemen – gendarmes, soldiers, Hlinka Guard, 1939.	Hungary	Slovakia	Victory: Annexation of a border strip between eastern Slovakia and Carpathian Ruthenia
1 September 1939 – 2 September 1945 Hungary entered: 27 June 1941 Hungary exited: 11 May 1945	World War II Hungarian Arrow Cross militia and a German Tiger II tank in Budapest, October 1944 Hungarian Toldi I tank used during the 1941 invasion of the Soviet Union	Axis powers (Nazi Germany) Germany; Italy (1940–43); Empire of Japan Affiliate states Romania (1941–44); Hungary (from 1941); Bulgaria (1941–44); Thailand (1942–45) Client States Slovakia; Croatia Government of National Salvation Manchukuo; Mengjiang; Albania Co-belligerents Finland (1941–44) Iraq (1941) Vichy France (1940–44) Active neutrality Soviet Union (1939–41) Spain (1941–44) Argentina (1939–44	Allied Powers; Soviet Union (from June 1941); United States (from December 1941); United Kingdom; China; France (1939–40, 1944–45) In exile for part of the war Poland; Norway; Netherlands; Belgium; Free France (1940–44); Luxembourg; Greece; Czechoslovakia Other important belligerents Canada; India; Australia; New Zealand; South Africa; Yugoslavia; Ethiopia; Brazil; Mexico; Colombia; Cuba; Philippines; Mongolia Co-belligerents Italy (1943–1945) Romania (1944–1945); Finland (1944–1945); Bulgaria (1944–1945)	Defeat: Soviet occupation of Hungary; Paris Peace Treaties, 1947; First Vienna Award annulled (Czechoslovakia re-gained some of the territories lost to Hungary in 1938); Second Vienna Award annulled (Romania re-gained of Northern Transylvania, lost to Hungary in 1940); Hungarian withdrawal and loss of annexed territories to Yugoslavia; Soviet annexation of Carpathian Ruthenia (fully became part of again Hungary in 1939); Sovietization of Hungary; installation of a communist puppet regime
23 October – 10 November 1956	Hungarian Revolution of 1956 The flag, with a hole where the communist coat of arms had been cut out, became the symbol of the revolution.	Hungarian revolutionaries	Soviet Union (Hungarian People's Republic) People's Republic of Hungary	Defeat: Revolution crushed by Soviet troops; Re-imposition of Soviet-backed puppet regime until 1989; Soviet military presence in Hungary until 1991
20 – 21 August 1968	Warsaw Pact invasion of Czechoslovakia Soviet tanks with invasion stripes in Czechoslovakia, 1968	Warsaw Pact; Soviet Union; Bulgaria; Poland (Hungary) Hungary supported by East Germany	Czechoslovakia	Victory: Prague Spring crushed; Moscow Protocol; Soviet military presence in Czechoslovakia until 1991
