= Saad Ghaffoori =

Sa'ad al-Obaidi Ghaffoori
- أبو عبد
- Born: 1973 (age 51–52); Baghdad
- Other names: Abu Abed
- Known for: Sunni Awakening "Baghdad Awakening" - opposing al-Qaeda in Iraq

Saad al Obaidi Ghaffoori (Arabic: أبو عبد; born 1973) is a Sunni Awakening leader from Ameriyah in Baghdad.

== Early life ==
Sa'ad was born in Baghdad in 1973 and worked as a military officer.

== Iraq War ==
Following the 2003 invasion of Iraq, Abu Abed turned against al-Qaeda due to the often indiscriminate use of violence used by the terrorists, as well as the fact that Al-Qaeda terrorized Sunni citizens. Abu Abed was extremely good at routing out terrorists and al-Qaeda members from their strongholds. The U.S. Army began to employ his services, from the Knights of the Two Rivers (Forsain al Rafadain) which included thousands of Sons of Iraq and Sahwa loyalists, in order to counter the terrorist organizations operating in Baghdad. His courage earned the respect and accolades of American soldiers.

His rapidly growing popularity on both the Sunni and the Shi'ia street was perceived as a political threat to the predominantly-Shi'ia government in Baghdad, as well as entrenched Sunni politicians. Once al-Qaeda was no longer deemed a threat to the Maliki government, Abu Abed was forced into exile. Abu Abed is wanted by the Maliki government as well as al-Qaeda/ISIS operatives.

== See also ==
- Al-Qaeda in Iraq
- Sons of Iraq
