= List of military conflicts involving Hungary (1701–1900) =

This is a list of military conflicts in which Hungarian armed forces participated in or took place on the historical territory of Hungary.

By timeline:

- List of military conflicts involving Hungary (800–1300)
- List of military conflicts involving Hungary (1301–1526)
- List of military conflicts involving Hungary (1527–1700)
- List of military conflicts involving Hungary (1701–1900)
- List of military conflicts involving Hungary (1901–2000)
- List of military conflicts involving Hungary (2001–)

For major wars, see:

- List of wars involving Hungary

The list includes the name, date, Hungarian allies and enemies, and the result of each conflict, using the following legend:

Victory
Defeat
Result of civil or internal conflict
Treaty or peace without a clear result, status quo ante bellum, an unknown or indecisive result
Ongoing conflict

== Wars between 1700 and 1900 ==
Conflict		Belligerents		Result
Date	Name	Allies	Enemies	Outcome
15 June 1703 – 1 May 1711	Rákóczi's War for Independence Kuruc prepare to attack traveling coach and riders, c. 1705.	Kingdom of Hungary: Kuruc; Principality of Transylvania Kingdom of France Sympathetic minority peoples and mercenaries	Holy Roman Empire: Austria; Prussia; Margraviate of Baden; Serbs from the Military Frontier; Transylvanian Saxons; Kingdom of Croatia; Royalists; (Denmark) Danish Auxiliary Corps Mercenaries	Defeat: Crushing of rebellion
January 1716 – 21 July 1718	Austro-Turkish War (1716–1718) The Battle of Petrovaradin, 1716.	Habsburg Monarchy: Royal Hungarian regiments	Ottoman Empire: Kuruc renegades	Treaty of Passarowitz
1735 – 1 September 1739	Russo-Austro-Turkish War	Russian Empire Habsburg Monarchy	Ottoman Empire	Victory: Treaty of Niš; Treaty of Belgrade
16 December 1740 – 18 October 1748	War of the Austrian Succession Battle of Fontenoy, 1745	Habsburg Monarchy: Kingdom of Hungary; Great Britain (Province of Hanover) Hanover Dutch Republic Saxony (1743–45) Savoy-Sardinia (1742–48) Russia (1741–43, 1748)	France Prussia (1740–42, 1744–45) Spain Bavaria (1741–45) Saxony (1741–42) Savoy-Sardinia (1741–42) (Kingdom of Naples) Naples Genoa (1745–48) Sweden (1741–43)	Treaty of Aix-la-Chapelle; Maria Theresa retains the Austrian, Bohemian and Hungarian thrones; Francis of Lorraine, Maria Theresa's husband, confirmed as Holy Roman Emperor
17 May 1756 – 15 February 1763	Seven Years' War	France (Habsburg monarchy) Holy Roman Empire: Austria; Kingdom of Hungary; Saxony; Russia (until 1762); Spain (from 1762); Sweden (1757–62); Mughal Empire (from 1757); Abenaki Confederacy	Great Britain Prussia; Portugal (from 1762) (Province of Hanover) Hanover; Brunswick-Wolfenbüttel; Hesse-Kassel; Schaumburg-Lippe; Iroquois Confederacy	Status Quo Ante Bellum: Treaty of Saint Petersburg (1762); Treaty of Hamburg (1762); Treaty of Paris (1763); Treaty of Hubertusburg (1763)
31 October – 14 December 1784	Revolt of Horea, Cloșca and Crișan	Habsburg Monarchy: Kingdom of Hungary	Transylvanian Romanian rebels	Victory
20 April 1792 – 18 October 1797	War of the First Coalition	Holy Roman Empire: Habsburg monarchy; Prussia (until 1795); Great Britain (Kingdom of France) Army of Condé; Spain (until 1795); Dutch Republic (until 1795); Portugal; Sardinia (until 1796)	Kingdom of France (until 1792) (French First Republic) French Republic (from 1792) Spain (from 1796) Batavian Republic (from 1795) (Kingdom of Italy (Napoleonic)) Sister republics Polish Legions (from 1797)	Defeat: Peace of Basel; Peace of Campo Formio
December 1798 – 25 March 1802	War of the Second Coalition	Holy Roman Empire: Habsburg Monarchy; Hungary; Great Britain (until 1801); United Kingdom (from 1801); Russia (until 1799); Portugal; Naples; Grand Duchy of Tuscany (Sovereign Military Order of Malta) Order of Saint John (1798); Ottoman Empire (Kingdom of France) French Royalists	France; Spain; Polish Legions; Batavian Republic Helvetic Republic (Kingdom of Italy (Napoleonic)) Cisalpine Republic (Kingdom of Italy (Napoleonic)) Roman Republic (until 1799)	Defeat: Treaty of Lunéville
April 1805 – 21 July 1806	War of the Third Coalition	Holy Roman Empire: Austria; Hungary; Russian Empire; United Kingdom; Kingdom of Naples (Kingdom of the Two Sicilies) Kingdom of Sicily; Sweden	France: Spain; Electorate of Bavaria; Napoleonic Italy; Batavian Republic; Württemberg; (Kingdom of Italy (Napoleonic)) Etruria	Defeat: Treaty of Pressburg; Consolidation of the French Empire; Creation of the Confederation of the Rhine; Dissolution of the Holy Roman Empire; Formation of the Fourth Coalition a few months later
10 April – 14 October 1809	War of the Fifth Coalition Napoleon at the Battle of Wagram, 1809	Austria Hungary Tyrol (Note: In rebellion against Bavaria) United Kingdom Spain (Kingdom of the Two Sicilies) Sicily Sardinia Black Brunswickers	France Confederation of the Rhine: Bavaria; Saxony; Württemberg; Westphalia; Italy Polish Legions Naples Switzerland (Netherlands) Holland	Defeat: Treaty of Schönbrunn
24 June – 14 December 1812	French invasion of Russia	France Duchy of Warsaw (Kingdom of Italy (Napoleonic)) Kingdom of Italy Naples Confederation of the Rhine: Baden; Bavaria; Berg; Saxony; Westphalia; (Switzerland) Swiss Confederation Napoleonic Spain Austria; Prussia; Denmark–Norway	Russian Empire	The Habsburg Monarchy joins the Coalition: Beginning of the War of the Sixth Coalition
3 March 1813 – 30 May 1814	War of the Sixth Coalition Battle of Leipzig	Austria; Prussia United Kingdom; Sweden; Russia; Spain; Portugal (Kingdom of the Two Sicilies) Sicily; Sardinia	France Napoleonic Italy Kingdom of Naples Duchy of Warsaw	Victory: Treaty of Paris; Treaty of Fontainebleau; Bourbon Restoration, exile of Napoleon Bonaparte; Congress of Vienna
20 March – 8 July 1815	War of the Seventh Coalition	Austria; Prussia; United Kingdom; Russia (Province of Hanover) Hanover Nassau; Brunswick; Sweden; United Netherlands; Spain; Portugal; Sardinia (Kingdom of the Two Sicilies) Sicily; Tuscany; Switzerland (Kingdom of France) French Royalists	France (Kingdom of the Two Sicilies) Naples	Victory: Treaty of Paris
July – August 1831	Cholera Riots	Hungarian peasants	Austrian Empire	Defeat
15 March 1848 – 4 October 1849	Hungarian Revolution of 1848 Artist Mihály Zichy's painting of Sándor Petőfi recites the National Poem to a crowd on 15 March 1848.	Kingdom of Hungary (1848–49) Hungarian State (1849) Allied peoples and legions	Austrian Empire Russian Empire Allied peoples and legions	Defeat: Revolution suppressed by Austrian, Russian, and allied forces; Reincorporation of Hungary into the Austrian Empire
19 September 1848 – 21 November 1849	Slovak Uprising of 1848–49	Kingdom of Hungary (1848–49) Hungarian State (1849)	Slovak National Council Austrian Empire	Indecisive settlement
29 April – 11 July 1859	Second Italian War of Independence Napoleon III at the Battle of Solferino, 1859	Austrian Empire; Habsburg Tuscany	France Sardinia supported by United Provinces of Central Italy	Defeat: Sardinia annexed Lombardy from Austria; Sardinia occupied and later annexed Habsburg-ruled Tuscany and Emilia; France gains Savoy and Nice from Sardinia
14 June – 26 July 1866	Austro-Prussian War Battle of Königgrätz, by Georg Bleibtreu. Oil on canvas, 1869.	Austrian Empire and allied German states	Prussia and allied German states Italy	Defeat: Prussia annexes parts of Bavaria, Hanover, Hesse-Kassel, parts of Hesse-Darmstadt, Holstein, Schleswig, Nassau, and Frankfurt; Italy annexes Venetia and part of Friuli; Dissolution of the German Confederation; Formation of the North German Confederation; Exclusion of Austria from Germany; Formation of Austria-Hungary
October 1869 – 11 January 1870	Krivošije Uprising	Austria-Hungary	Krivošije rebels	Stalemate: Most rebel demands met
29 July – 20 October 1878	Occupation of Bosnia	Austria-Hungary	Bosnia Vilayet tacit support Ottoman Empire	Victory: Bosnia placed under Austro-Hungarian occupation as a condominium; Pacification of local resistance
2 November 1899 – 7 September 1901	Boxer Rebellion The Siege of the International Legations in Peking, 1900	Eight-Nation Alliance United Kingdom Japan Russia France Germany United States Austria-Hungary Italy	China Yihetuan	Victory: Boxer Protocol signed
