= Operation Augurs of Prosperity =

2008 military operation in Iraq

- Part of the Iraq War, Post-invasion Iraq
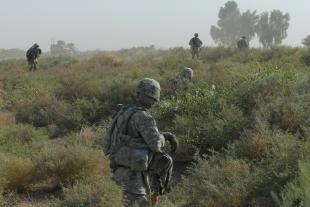
- Soldiers from the 2nd Squadron, 3rd ACR, provide security during Operation Sabre Pursuit in eastern Diyala.
Date	29 July 2008 – 11 August 2008 (first phase)
Location	Diyala, Iraq
Result	U.S.-Iraqi Victory

Belligerents
United States; Iraq	Islamic State of Iraq; Other Iraqi Insurgents

Commanders and leaders
(United States) Maj. Gen. Mark Hertling	Basem al Safaah (POW)

Strength
(Iraq) 50,000 Iraqi soldiers and police (United States) 3,000 U.S. soldiers	Unknown

Casualties and losses
51 security forces killed 7 Sons of Iraq killed	15 killed, 800 captured
- At least 70 civilians killed

Operation Augurs of Prosperity (Arabic: Bashaer al-Kheir) was an Iraqi operation against insurgents in Diyala, north-east of Baghdad. The operation was launched on 29 July 2008 by elements of at least three Iraqi Army divisions, with four U.S. armored cavalry squadrons from the 3rd Armored Cavalry Regiment and the 2nd Stryker Cavalry Regiment in support. The U.S. led operation was designated Operation Iron Pursuit and consisted of three sub-operations: Sabre Pursuit, Eagle Pursuit and Bastogne Pursuit.

According to the Iraqi Ministry of Defence, the first phase of the operation was concluded on 11 August. Major-General Mohammed al-Askari reported that the Iraqi security forces had achieved half of the goals set for the operation. Al-Askari reported that 800 suspects had been arrested, including 42 Islamic State of Iraq leaders.

== Background ==
In January 2008, U.S. forces throughout Iraq launched Operation Phantom Phoenix, a corps-level operation with a significant focus on Diyala. Despite a decrease in violence, partly attributable to Awakening Councils, groups formed by Sunni sheiks and supported by American forces, attacks remained at high levels. Many of these attacks were directed at the leaders of these groups.

Insurgents retained strongholds in the western desert regions of Diyala, in the foothills of the Hamrin mountains and around Lake Hamrin. These locations were a fall-back position for Islamic State of Iraq and other insurgent groups and were targeted by U.S. special operations forces in the months leading up to the operation.

== The operation ==
On 29 July, the Diyala Operational Command imposed a curfew throughout the province, restricting all unofficial vehicle movement, and a number of checkpoints were set up in the capital, Baqubah.

Iraqi forces conducted a number of house searches in Baqubah and Khan Bani Saad, 15 miles south of Baqubah.

On 31 July, Iraqi forces captured Abu Anas al-Baghdadi, Islamic State of Iraq's media expert in the country, as well as four members of the Mujahideen Shura Council during a raid in western Diyala. Iraqi security forces lifted the curfew throughout the province.

On 2 August, the U.S. 3rd Armored Cavalry Regiment handed over responsibility for security in Balad Ruz, in the east of the province, to Iraqi security forces from the 18th brigade, 5th Iraqi Army Division, indicating that the region appears to have been cleared.

By 5 August, Iraqi forces had captured a number of key Islamic State of Iraq leaders, including Qussai Ali Khalaf, the head of Islamic State of Iraq in Diyala; Adnan Gumer Mohammed, Basem al Safaah and Antisar Khudair, a woman suspected of recruiting female suicide bombers. According to U.S. forces, insurgents appeared to be fleeing from Diyala westwards towards Salah-ad-Din as Iraqi forces pushed up the Uzaym River valley. U.S. forces from the 1st Brigade, 101st Airborne Division, set up blocking positions in Salah-ad-Din to catch these insurgents. It also conducted a number of air assaults into known Islamic State of Iraq rear areas.

== Aftermath ==
On 25 August, the insurgents struck back when a suicide bomber attacked a police recruiting station killing 35 recruits in Jalawla.

== See also ==
- Diyala campaign
