= Sons of Iraq =

Iraqi military group in Al Anbar (2005–2013)

- Flag of the Iraq Awakening Conference
- Leaders: Sheik Abdul Sattar Buzaigh al-Rishawi (assassinated) (executed); Sheikh Ali Hatem Ali Sulaiman; Sheikh Abdul-Jabbar Abu Risha; Sheikhs of Al-Bu Nimr; Sheiks of Al-Bu Issa; Saad Ghaffoori (a.k.a. Abu Abed); Abu Azzam al Tamimi (executed); Adel al-Mashhadani (killed in January 2014) (executed)
- Dates active: 2005–2013
- Groups: Albu Risha; Al-Jaghayfa; Al-Jabbour; Albu Fahd; Albu Nimr; Albu Isa; Albu Dhiyab; Albu Ali; Albu Fraj
- Active regions: Iraq
- Ideology: Islamic democracy Iraqi nationalism
- Size: 51,900 (estimated in January 2011); 30,000 (June 6, 2012)

The Sons of Iraq (Arabic: أبناء العراق Abnāʼ al-ʻIrāq), also known as al-Sahwah (Arabic: الصحوة, lit. 'the awakening'), were a coalition in the Al Anbar governorate in Iraq between Sunni tribal leaders as well as former Saddam-era Iraqi military officers that united in 2005 against Al-Qaeda in Iraq. A moderate group, they received extensive funding from the US. The group's creation was spearheaded by US General David Petraeus to defeat AQI in Al Anbar by providing hundreds of millions of dollars in subsidies to tribal leaders and fighters.

After arriving into power, Iraqi Prime Minister Nouri al-Maliki relied on sectarian policies to consolidate his power. Maliki denounced the Sons of Iraq as a national threat, actively dismantling them and refusing to integrate them into Iraqi security services. Sunnis formerly serving with the group were faced with options including becoming unemployed or joining the Islamic State. This turn of events is considered a key factor that contributed to the failure of Iraq to stabilize, ultimately leading to the War in Iraq (2013–17).

== Other names ==
The Sons of Iraq were also known by numerous names:

- Anbar's Salvation (Arabic: إنقاذ الأنبار Inqādh al-Anbār) or Anbar Salvation Council (Arabic: مجلس إنقاذ الأنبار majlis inqadh al-Anbār). In Arabic the council is known as Sahawa Al Anbar (Arabic: صحوة الأنبار), abbreviated SAA when referred to by the US Army. The council has become a model for awakening movements across Iraq, though the Iraqi Defense Ministry has said that it plans to disband the Awakening groups due to concerns about their origins and future intent.
- National Council for the Salvation of Iraq (Arabic: المجلس الوطني لإنقاذ العراق al-Majlis al-Waṭanī li-Inqādh al-ʻIrāq)
- Sunni Salvation movement (Arabic: حركة الإنقاذ السني Ḥarakat al-Inqādh al-Sunnī)
- National Council for the Awakening of Iraq (Arabic: المجلس الوطني لصحوة العراق al-Majlis al-Waṭanī li-Ṣaḥwat al-ʻIrāq)
- Sunni Awakening movement (Arabic: حركة الصحوة السنية Ḥarakat al-Ṣaḥwah al-Sunnīyah)

Awakening movements in Iraq are also referred to as:

- "Mercenaries" (Maliki aide, al-Qa'eda)
- U.S. military/Government of Iraq:
  - "Concerned Local Citizens" – CLC
  - "Sons of Iraq" – SOIZ
  - "Very Worried Iraqis"
  - "Critical Infrastructure Security" – CIS
  - "Abna Al-Iraq" – AAI
- "Sahwa" militia
- "Former Sunni insurgents" – CFR Senior Fellow Steven Simon

== Overview ==
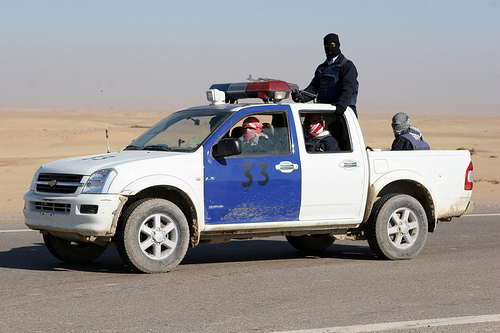
Iraqi police affiliated with the Sons of Iraq in Ramadi

The movement started among Sunni tribes in Al Anbar governorate in 2005 to become an ad hoc armed force across the country in less than a year.

The Awakening fighters in Iraq were credited by many independent analysts with reducing levels of violence in the areas in which they operated; however, the rapid growth of the groups, whose salaries were initially paid for completely by the US military, also led to concerns about allegations of some members' past activities fighting against coalition forces and concerns of infiltration by al-Qaeda. Iraqi Prime Minister Nouri al-Maliki warned that the US-armed 'concerned local citizens' were an armed Sunni opposition in the making, and argued that such groups should be under the command of the Iraqi Army or police.

In 2009, Iraqi Defense Ministry disbanded the Sunni Awakening groups so they would not become a separate military force. Later that year, some Awakening groups threatened to set the streets ablaze and "start a tribal war" after not doing well in elections.

== Anbar Awakening ==
In 2005, the Albu Mahals, a tribe that smuggled foreign fighters and material across the Syria–Iraq border, was being forced out of their territory by the Al Salmani tribe allied with al-Qaeda in Iraq. The tribe proposed an alliance with the local USMC Battalion under the command of LtCol Dale Alford in November 2005, after being forcibly displaced from their traditional base in Al-Qa'im, and began receiving weapons and training. From August to December 2006, the al-Anbar governorate of Iraq was occupied by Al Qaeda (AQI). Much of the stronghold of AQI was in Ramadi, the capital of the al-Anbar governorate. The sheikhs and officials were Sunni by sect, so they initially cooperated with AQI to counterbalance the Shiite government and the Shiite insurgents. But later, the terrorism which AQI promoted was not in line with the Sheik's interests. They then joined forces with the US troops in the area, the Iraqi Police and the Provisional Army. They strengthened the city council and dubbed their movement the "awakening". The US and the Iraqi people later gained control of Fallujah and Ramadi. This movement was one of the shining symbols of counterinsurgency policy—rhetoric of the New Way surge policy which George W. Bush outlined in his State of the Union address marked this as the ideal of counterinsurgency. The six points which Bush outlined were met; the people were united to save their city and the US forces gained support of both the officials and citizens.

Despite warnings from some portions of United States intelligence community, Sheik Abdul Sattar Buzaigh al-Rishawi was assassinated along with two bodyguards, by a roadside bomb planted near his home in Ramadi, in September 2007. His brother, Ahmed Abu Risha, took over as leader, but so far has been unable to unite the various awakening militias.

In October 2008, the Iraqi government took over from the American military the responsibility for paying 54,000 members of the Awakening councils. Many of the Awakening fighters put little trust in the Iraqi government to help employ them. "I consider the transfer an act of betrayal by the U.S. Army," said one Awakening member in response to the transfer.

== Founding ==
Sheik Abdul Sattar Buzaigh al-Rishawi was a Sunni leader in the Al-Anbar governorate leading a growing movement of Sunni tribesmen who have turned against al-Qaida-linked insurgents. Al-Rishawi, whose father and three brothers were killed by al-Qaida assassins, said insurgents were "killing innocent people, anyone suspected of opposing them. They brought us nothing but destruction and we finally said, enough is enough."

Al-Rishawi founded the Anbar Salvation Council in September 2006 with dozens of Sunni tribes. Many of the new newly friendly leaders are believed to have at least tacitly supported the insurgency in the past, though al-Rishawi said he never did. His movement, also known as the Anbar Awakening, now counts 41 tribes or sub-tribes from Anbar, though al-Rishawi acknowledges that some groups in the governorate have yet to join. It's unclear how many that is, or much support the movement really has. On September 13, 2007, al-Rishawi was killed along with two of his bodyguards by a roadside bomb near his home in Ramadi, Anbar, Iraq.

== Work in Iraq ==
The groups were paid by the American military and the Iraqi government to lay down their arms against coalition forces, patrol neighborhoods, and to fight against other Sunni insurgents. The US military says the groups helped it target al-Qaeda in Iraq more precisely and avoid collateral damage. The Washington Post writes the awakening groups caused al-Qaeda in Iraq to soften its tactics in an effort to regain public support.

Fighting against the Americans in the earlier phases of the war, elements of this group have since allied themselves with the U.S. to rid their country of foreign extremist composing mainly of al-Qaeda in Iraq. It has been reported that they have received cars, guns, and ammunition by the Iraqi and U.S. forces to counter the radical Islamists in Al-Anbar governorate.

Al-Qaeda in Iraq condemned the groups for fighting insurgents and for standing by the "filthy crusaders". Some members of the awakening groups were reportedly former insurgents, and some awakening members have been killed by former awakening members in suicide bombings. Sheiks who worked with the awakening movement also frequently faced killings which originated from outside the movement.

The Government Accountability Office, the audit arm of the United States Congress, warned that the groups had still "not reconciled with the Iraqi government" and that the potential remained for further infiltration by insurgents. That report received wide criticism for its lack of factual data and its reliance upon "Green Zone" analysis.

== Disbanding ==
The Iraqi Defense Ministry had planned to disband the Awakening groups so they do not become a separate military force. "We completely, absolutely reject the Awakening becoming a third military organization," Iraqi Defense Minister Abdul-Qadir al-Obaidi said. Al-Obaidi said the groups also would not be allowed to have any infrastructure, such as a headquarters building, that would give them long-term legitimacy.

The Iraqi government pledged to absorb about a quarter of the men into the state military and security services, and to provide vocational training to the rest of the members of the Awakening groups. The Iraqi Interior Ministry agreed to hire about 7,000 men on temporary contracts and planned to hire an additional 3,000; however, the ministry hasn't specified the contract length or specific positions for the men to fill. Deborah D. Avant, director of international studies at the University of California-Irvine, said there are ominous similarities between the awakening councils and armed groups in past conflicts that were used for short-term military gains but ended up being roadblocks for state building.

According to Ramzy Mardini, an Iraq expert at the Jamestown Foundation, "the rise of the Awakening councils may risk reigniting the Jaysh al-Mahdi". On February 22, 2008, Muqtada al-Sadr announced that he will extend his ceasefire on his Jaysh al-Mahdi militia. But according to Mardini, the uncertainty facing the Sunni tribal Awakening movement's status may cut that ceasefire short. Mardini suggests that if the movement's demands are not satisfied by Iraq's Shia-dominated central government, the U.S. 'surge' strategy is at risk for failing, "even to the point of reverting back to pre-surge status". Subsequent results of the US-UK 2007 "Iraqi Surge" seem to have disproved Mardini's speculation. Those Awakening Council demands include that Awakening fighters be incorporated into Iraq's security forces, having permanent positions and payrolls.

In August 2008, Iraqi Prime Minister Nouri Al-Maliki offered 3,000 of the 100,000 Sons of Iraq members jobs in Diyala governorate in hopes that it would lead to information about militants in the area. Other members of the paramilitary were used in the Diyala Campaign.

In March 2009, the leader of the Sunni tribal-based Awakening Movement in Fadhil, Baghdad, was arrested on allegations of murder, extortion and "violating the Constitution". Adel al-Mashhadani was accused of being the Fadhil leader of the banned Baath Party's military wing. His arrest sparked a two-day gunbattle between Awakening members and Shia-dominated government security forces. In November 2009 he was convicted and sentenced to death for murder and kidnapping.

By June 6, 2012, about 70,000 members of the group had been integrated into the Iraqi Security Forces or given civilian jobs, with 30,000 continuing to maintain checkpoints and being paid a salary by the government of around $300 per month. On January 29, 2013, Iraqi Shia-appointed officials said they would raise the salaries of Awakening Council fighters, the latest bid to appease Sunni anti-government rallies that erupted in December, 2012. Some 41,000 Awakening Council fighters are to receive 500,000 Iraqi dinars ($415) a month, up from 300,000 dinars ($250).

On January 21, 2013, the Iraqi Shia-dominated government, announced the execution of 26 men convicted of "terrorism", including Adel Mashhadani, who was arrested in March 2009 and sentenced to death in November of that year for killing a young girl in a revenge attack.

== Governorate elections in 2009 ==
Several political parties formed out of the Awakening movements contested the 2009 Iraqi governorate elections. The Iraq Awakening and Independents National Alliance list won the largest number of seats in Anbar Governorate.

== Islamic State reprisals ==
Following the 2010 re-election of Nouri al-Maliki, the Islamic State began a campaign of assassination of Sunni tribal leaders and the remnants of the Awakening movement in Iraq's Al-Anbar governorate. The drive-by shootings and point-blank assassinations were documented in an Islamic State video called "The Clanging of the Swords." Between 2009 and 2013, 1,345 Awakening members were killed. In one town, Jurf al-Sakhar, south of Baghdad, 46 Awakening members were killed in 27 incidents.

== Members ==
- Sheikh Ahmed Abu Risha was the head in 2007.

=== Assassinated members ===
- Abdul Sattar Buzaigh al-Rishawi – former leader of the Anbar Salvation Council
- Fasal al Gaood – former governor of Al Anbar

== See also ==
- 2005 in Iraq
- 2006 in Iraq
- 2007 in Iraq
- 2008 in Iraq
- Abdul Sattar Abu Risha
- Al-Qaeda in Iraq
- Iraqi civil war (2006–2008)
- Iraq War troop surge of 2007
- Saad Ghaffoori
- Ma'awisley, similar phenomenon in Somalia during the Somali civil war.
