= Albu Nimr =

Sunni Arab tribe

Albu Nimr البو نمر
- Ethnicity: Arab
- Location: Upper Euphrates river basin (mainly central Anbar, but also present in Mosul, Saladin & Baghdad)
- Population: 500,000
- Language: Arabic, Iraqi Arabic
- Religion: Sunni Islam

Albu Nimr or al-Bu Nimr (Arabic: البو نمر or البونمر) is a Sunni Arab tribe (عشيرة ashirah) of some 500,000 people living in Ramadi in Al Anbar Governorate of Iraq. It is part of the larger Dulaim tribe.

In the years after 2007, Albu Nimr was part of the Sahwa militia that fought al-Qaeda in Iraq. In 2014, it was one of the Sunni Arab tribes that fiercely opposed the Islamic State.

== Mass killings of members of Albu Nimr ==
Locations of mass killings

ISIL declared that the Albu Nimr tribesmen had lost loyalty to Islam by joining the Iraqi army.

At the end of October 2014, there were reports that fighters of the Islamic State massacred Albu Nimr tribesmen. The bodies of some 200 of them were found in a ditch used as a mass grave near Hīt, while at least 48 and possible more than 60 tribesmen were publicly executed inside the city. The Human Rights Ministry of Iraq said at the beginning of November 2014 that the number of Albu Nimr tribe members killed was 322.

=== Hīt city ===
Radio Free Europe/Radio Liberty reported on November 10, 2014, that according to tribal sources the Islamic State had carried out another mass killing of over 70 members of Albu Nimr tribesmen near Hīt. Another 300 were missing. Tribal leaders said that more than 630 members of the Albu Nimr tribe were killed in the prior two weeks.

Another 16 members of the Albu Nimr tribe were executed by the Islamic State in Tharthar area, north of Ramadi, according to reports on November 13, 2014.

On December 17, 2014, it was reported by Turkish media, that the Islamic State had executed at least 150 women from the Albu Nimr tribe in Falluja for refusing to marry militants of the Islamic State. Some of the women were reported to be pregnant.

Seventy Albu Nimr members were shot dead by the Islamic State in the village of Khanizir, in Anbar Governorate, on the night of October 4, 2015. According to tribesman Sheikh Naeem al-Gaoud, they were killed "because they had relatives serving in the Iraqi security forces". He also stated that "the men targeted on Sunday had fled to Khanizir with their families from the homes in the al-Furat district of Ramadi after IS captured Anbar's provincial capital last May".

== See also ==
- Al-Shaitat
