= Battle of Vízvár =

Part of the Austro-Turkish War (1663–1664)

- Part of the Austro-Turkish War (1663–1664)
Date	10 October 1663
Location	Vízvár (near Keszegfalva), Csallóköz
Result	Hungarian victory

Belligerents
(Habsburg monarchy) Habsburg Monarchy: Kingdom of Hungary	Ottoman Empire

Commanders and leaders
Miklós Zrínyi	(Ottoman Empire) Unknown

Strength
15,000 men	Unknown

Casualties and losses
12 casualties	600 killed, 20 POWs, many horses, camels, and weapons captured.

The Battle of Vízvár was an engagement that took place on October 10, at Vízvár in Csallóköz in Lower Hungary. The 15,000-strong united Christian army (joined by two German regiments) ambushed and defeated the Turkish rearguard. 600 Turks were killed in the battle, while the Hungarians suffered only 12 casualties.
