= Fadhil Omer =

Provincial Council Chairman (PCC) of Dahuk
- Appointed by: Dahuk Provincial Council (PC)

Personal details
- Party: Kurdistan Democratic Party (KDP)

Fadhil Omer is the Kurdish former Provincial Council Chairman (PCC) of Iraq's Duhok Governorate in Kurdistan Region.
