= Fadhil Barrak =

Iraqi intelligence officer & spymaster

Major General Fadhil Barrak
- فاضل البراك

Head of the Iraqi Intelligence Service
- In office 1983–1989
- Preceded by: Hussein Kamel al-Majid
- Succeeded by: Sabawi Ibrahim al-Tikriti

Personal details
- Born: Fadhil Barrak Hussein al-Nasiri; 1942 Tikrit, Kingdom of Iraq
- Died: c. 1992 Iraq
- Party: Arab Socialist Ba'ath Party - Iraq Region
- Education: Institute of Oriental Studies of the Soviet Academy of Sciences
- Occupation: Intelligence officer writer

Military service
- Allegiance: Iraq
- Branch/service: Iraqi Intelligence Service
- Years of service: 1968–1989
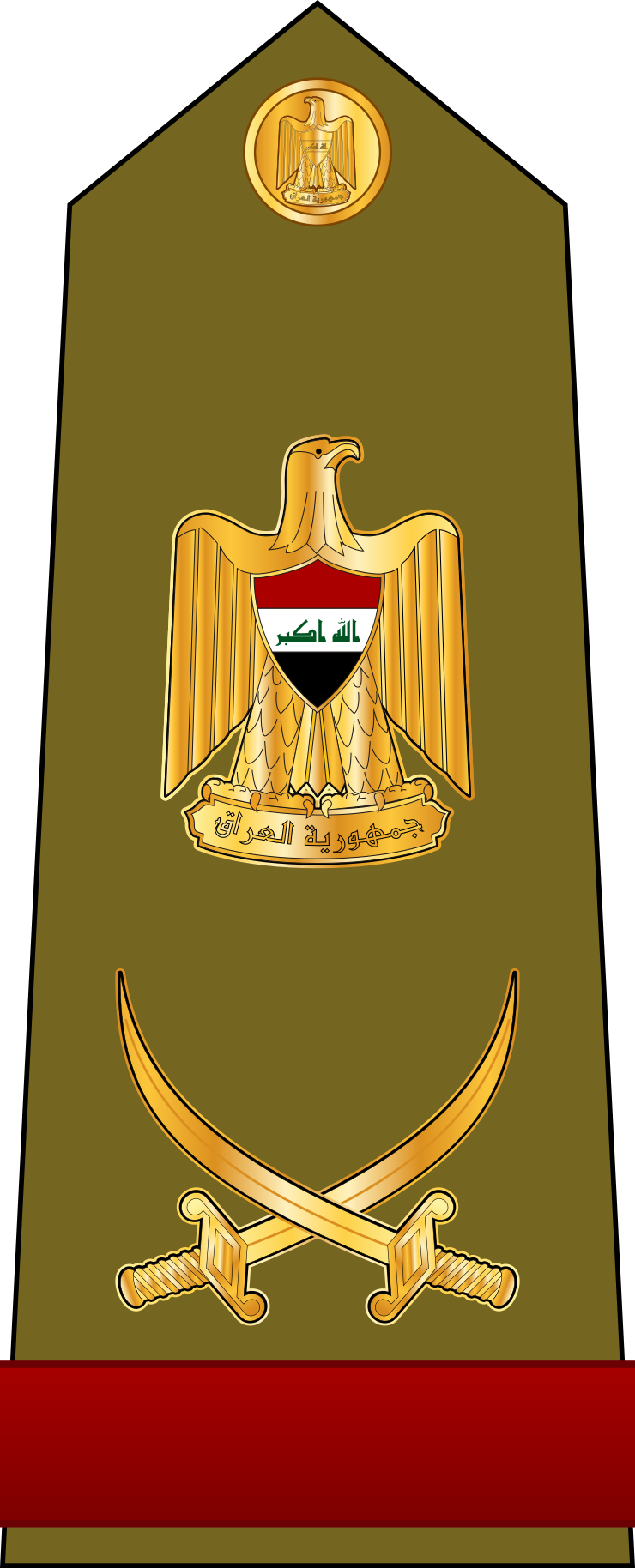
- Rank: Major General

Fadhil Barrak Hussein al-Nasiri (Arabic: فاضل براك حسين الناصري, 1942–1992) was an Iraqi writer, researcher, and intelligence officer who served as head of the Iraqi Intelligence Service from 1984 to 1989.

== Early life and education ==
Fadhil Barrak was born in Tikrit in 1942. He belonged to the Albu Nasser tribe, specifically the Al-Bikat clan of the Albu Musa Faraj branch. He completed his studies in Samarra and joined the Ba'ath Party in 1958.

In 1962, he enrolled in the Military College as part of Class 41 and became a member of the party's military organization within the institution. Following Abdul Salam Arif's seizure of power on 18 November 1963, his class was transferred to civilian positions due to its Ba'athist composition.

== Career ==
=== Early intelligence work (1968–1970) ===
Al-Barrak played a role in the 1968 Ba'athist coup, and following its success, he served as a security officer at the Presidential Palace. According to Salah Omar al-Ali, al-Barrak uncovered a coup attempt known as the Daoud Abdul Salam al-Darakzali plot in 1969.

He was subsequently transferred to serve as an aide to President Ahmed Hassan al-Bakr and later became commander of the radio station's security force, during which time he uncovered another plot referred to as the Abdul Ghani al-Rawi plot.

=== Service in Europe (1970–1976) ===
In 1970, al-Barrak was transferred to the Soviet Union as assistant military attaché, with responsibility for Ba'ath Party organizations in Eastern Europe and as a coordinator between intelligence agencies.

During this period, he reportedly persuaded Khalil al-Jaza'iri, secretary of the Iraqi Communist Party's organization in the Soviet Union, to defect.

Al-Barrak earned a doctorate from the Institute of Oriental Studies of the Soviet Academy of Sciences. His dissertation was titled The Role of the Iraqi Army in the National Defense Government and the War with Britain in 1941.

=== Director of General Security and Intelligence (1976–1989) ===
In 1976, al-Barrak was transferred to Baghdad as Director of General Security, where he worked to build and develop the directorate.

In 1983, Barzan Ibrahim al-Tikriti was removed from the intelligence service and in late 1983, al-Barrak was appointed Director of Intelligence.

During his tenure, the Intelligence Service's operational methodology was formalized. The Information Processing System and the Source Management System were implemented, and the responsibilities of leadership positions were more clearly defined.

Al-Barrak was elected to the Regional Command of the Ba'ath Party but declined due to his duties as Director of Intelligence. He instead remained a member of the Reserve Command and of the party's Military Bureau.

=== Later career (1989–1991) ===
In 1989, al-Barrak was transferred from the Intelligence Service to the Presidential Office as Head of the Political Department and Adviser to the President.

Following the Iraqi invasion of Kuwait, Abdul Malik al-Yassin stated in a television interview that a committee was formed by order of Saddam Hussein, headed by al-Barrak and al-Yassin and including several university professors, to provide an assessment of the Kuwait crisis and American threats against Iraq. The committee reportedly recommended withdrawal, but Saddam rejected the recommendation and dissolved the committee.

Al-Barrak retired in 1991.

== Regional and international activities ==
According to Mohamed Hassanein Heikal, al-Barrak met in Madrid with Robert Gates, who allegedly encouraged Iraq to attack post-revolutionary Iran in exchange for a promise to permit Iraq to occupy Kuwait. Presidential Secretary Abdul-Jabbar Mohsen also claimed that such a meeting took place, which became known as the "Secret Madrid Conference".

Before the invasion of Kuwait in 1990, al-Barrak visited London and the United States. He reportedly opposed the Iran–Iraq War, believing it could have been avoided through a peaceful settlement.

Al-Barrak was also tasked with restoring relations with Libya and reportedly succeeded in doing so. During the Lebanese Civil War, he maintained ties with Samir Geagea and President Amin Gemayel, as well as with Palestinian leaders including Yasser Arafat and Abu Iyad.

== Relationship with Muhammad Baqir al-Sadr ==
Following the Iranian Revolution in 1979, al-Barrak reportedly sought to restore relations between Muhammad Baqir al-Sadr and the Iraqi authorities.

Muhammad Reza al-Nu'mani, a companion of al-Sadr, stated in a television interview that al-Barrak met al-Sadr in Najaf and asked for his cooperation regarding communications with the authorities.

== Death ==
The circumstances of al-Barrak's death are disputed. One account states that he was executed in 1992 on charges of treason. Intelligence officials and other figures have claimed that his execution stemmed from a dispute with the president's brothers and his opposition to the occupation of Kuwait.

Khalil Ibrahim stated that he reviewed al-Barrak's case file and found no evidence of espionage, asserting that the execution resulted from personal differences.

== See also ==
- Iraqi Intelligence Service
