= Fadhil Assultani =

Iraqi poet and journalist

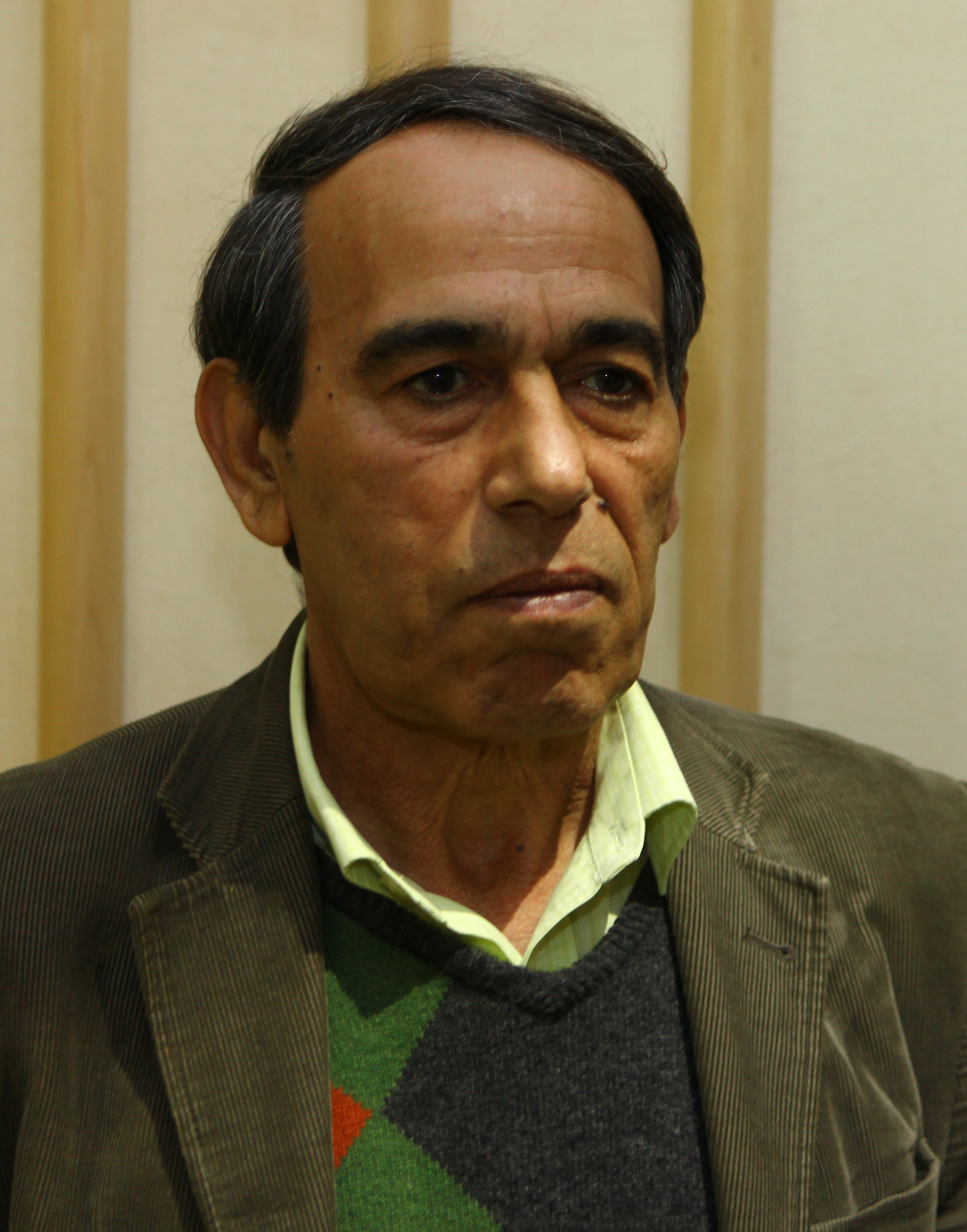
Assultani in 2011

Fadhil Assultani is an Iraqi poet, translator and journalist. He has lived in London since 1994, and works as an editor of cultural department at the daily London- based newspaper Asharqalawsat. He has published several books of poetry and translation. Some of his poems were translated into Germany, Spanish, Kurdish, Persian and English.

== Biography ==
Assultani has a B.A. in English Language, College of Arts, University of Baghdad, and MA in Modern and Contemporary Literature, Birkbeck College, University of London. His latest book in English is Philip Larkin An Outsider Poet: Transcendence of Solitude, Sex and the Ordinary.

His translations from English into Arabic include:

- Short Stories by William Trevor
- The Bluest Eye, by Tony Morrison
- The Wings and Other Poems, by Miroslav Holub
- Fifty Years of British Poetry (1950–2000), an anthology of British poetry including fifty-six British poets among them: Dylan Thomas, Louis MacNeice, Lawrence Durrell, Norman MacCaig, Hugh MacDiarmid, R. S. Thomas, Ted Hughes, Fillip Larkin, Charles Tomlinson, Seamus Heaney, Thom Gunn, Douglas Dunn, Michael Hamburger, Kathleen Raine, Andrew Motion, Brian Patten, Carol Ann Duffy, Catherine Fisher and others.
