= Fadhil al-Manasif =

Saudi human rights activist/photographer

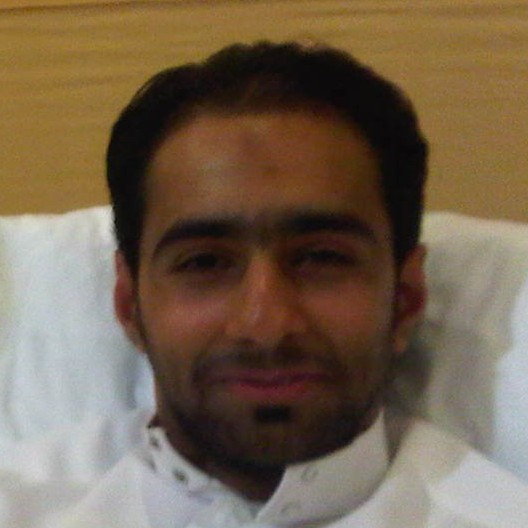
- Fadhil al-Manasif
- Occupation: Photographer

Fadhil al-Manasif is a photographer and member of the Saudi human rights organization Adala Center for Human Rights. Authorities arrested him in April 2009 along with 20 others for participating in protests and again in May 2011 for disseminating information to human rights groups and international media outlets covering street protests in the Eastern Province. In April 2014 the Specialized Criminal Court sentenced al-Manasif to 15 years in prison, imposed a 15-year ban on foreign travel, and fined him 100,000 Riyals (around $US 26,660), on charges including “breaking allegiance with the ruler,” “being in contact with foreign news agencies to exaggerate news and harm the reputation of Saudi Arabia and its people,” and communicating with international human rights organizations. The punishment was later reduced to 14 years on appeal.

According to Eman al-Nafjan, writing in 2014, Saudi Arabia's the new counterterrorism law, ostensibly targeting terrorists, was being used to target anyone not agreeing with the Saudi regime. One example was Fadhil al-Manasif, who was prosecuted under the same law for having "gone against the government, disturbed public order, undermined society security and state stability and incited sectarianism". The "proof" was that he had written on a napkin: “Amid the turmoil surrounding us we have to look for points of convergence and find words of unity for the sake of our country and its security. Calls for development, change and reform are charged with incitement and people are imprisoned for it. But with patience they will be an option that cannot be avoided.”
