= Bertalan Székely =

Hungarian painter (1835–1910)

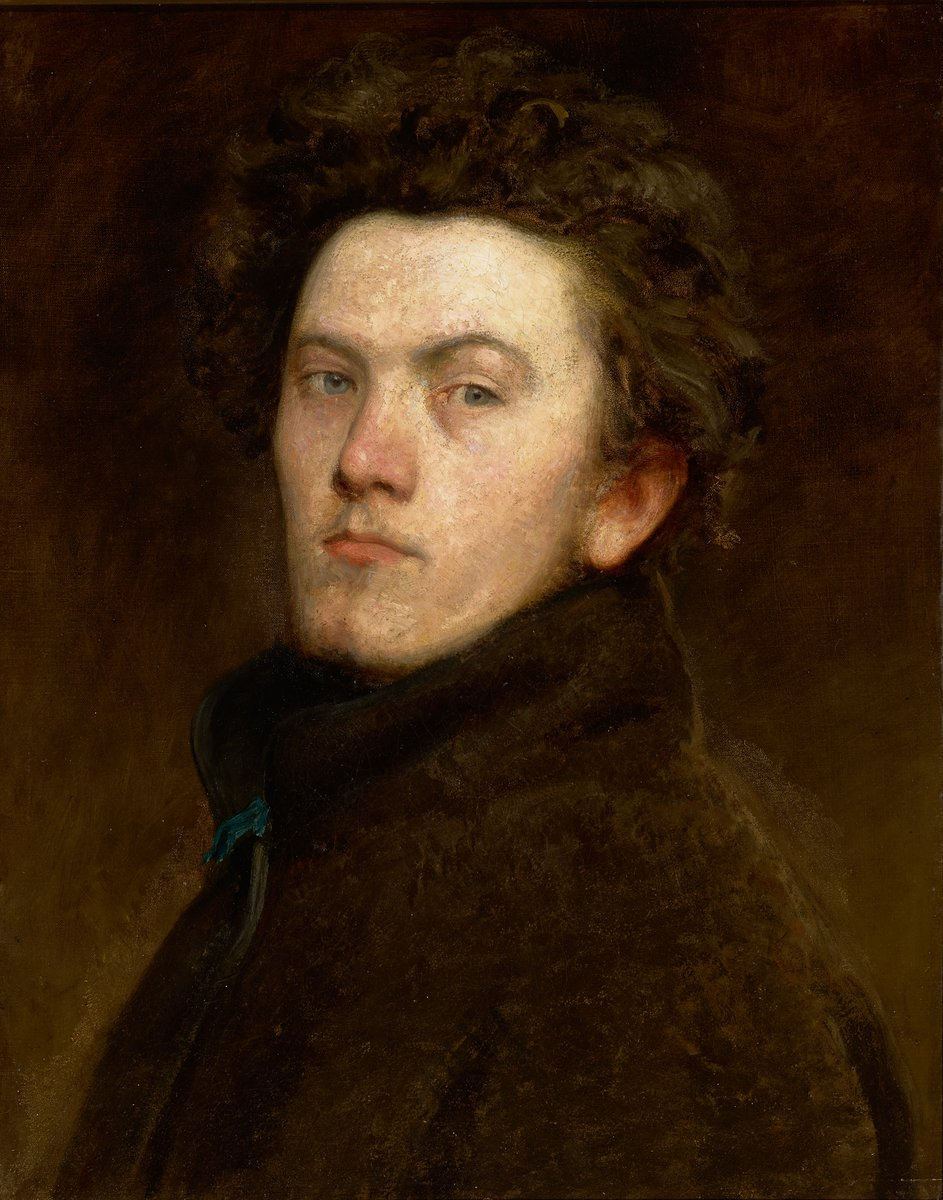
Self-portrait (1860)

Bertalan Székely (8 May 1835, Kolozsvár, Transylvania, Kingdom of Hungary (now Cluj-Napoca, Romania) – 21 August 1910, Budapest, Transleithania, Austria-Hungary) was a Hungarian history and portrait painter who worked in the Romantic and Academic styles.

== Biography ==
Born into a family that was originally part of the Transylvanian nobility, his father was a court clerk. Although his family wanted him to become an engineer, he studied at the Academy of Fine Arts, Vienna from 1851 to 1855, under Johann Nepomuk Geiger and Carl Rahl. He then returned to his hometown where, for the next three years, he worked as an art teacher. After a year of employment with Count Aichelburg in Marschendorf, he married and moved to Munich, where he studied with Karl von Piloty. It was there that he first developed his interest in history painting. In 1862, he settled in Pest.

The following year, he won a contest with his painting "The Escape of Emperor Charles VII" and used the prize money to finance a trip to the Netherlands and Paris, returning in 1864. He became one of the first teachers hired at the new "Hungarian Royal Drawing School" (now the Hungarian University of Fine Arts) in 1871 and served as its Director from 1902 to 1905, when he took over the master classes.

From the 1860s through the 1880s, he mostly painted portraits and female figures, then turned to landscapes. He also created decorative murals in the Matthias Church, Budapest Opera House and the City Hall in Kecskemét. Later, he became interested in the movement studies made by Edweard Muybridge and Étienne-Jules Marey and conducted some of his own.

== Selected paintings ==
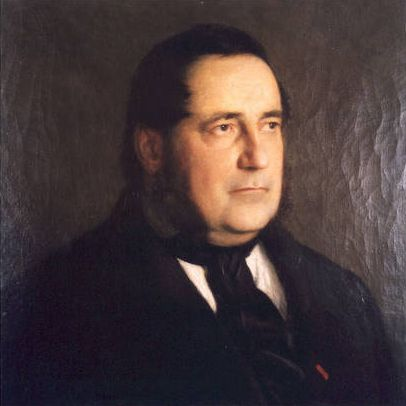
Portrait of Adalbert Stifter (1863)

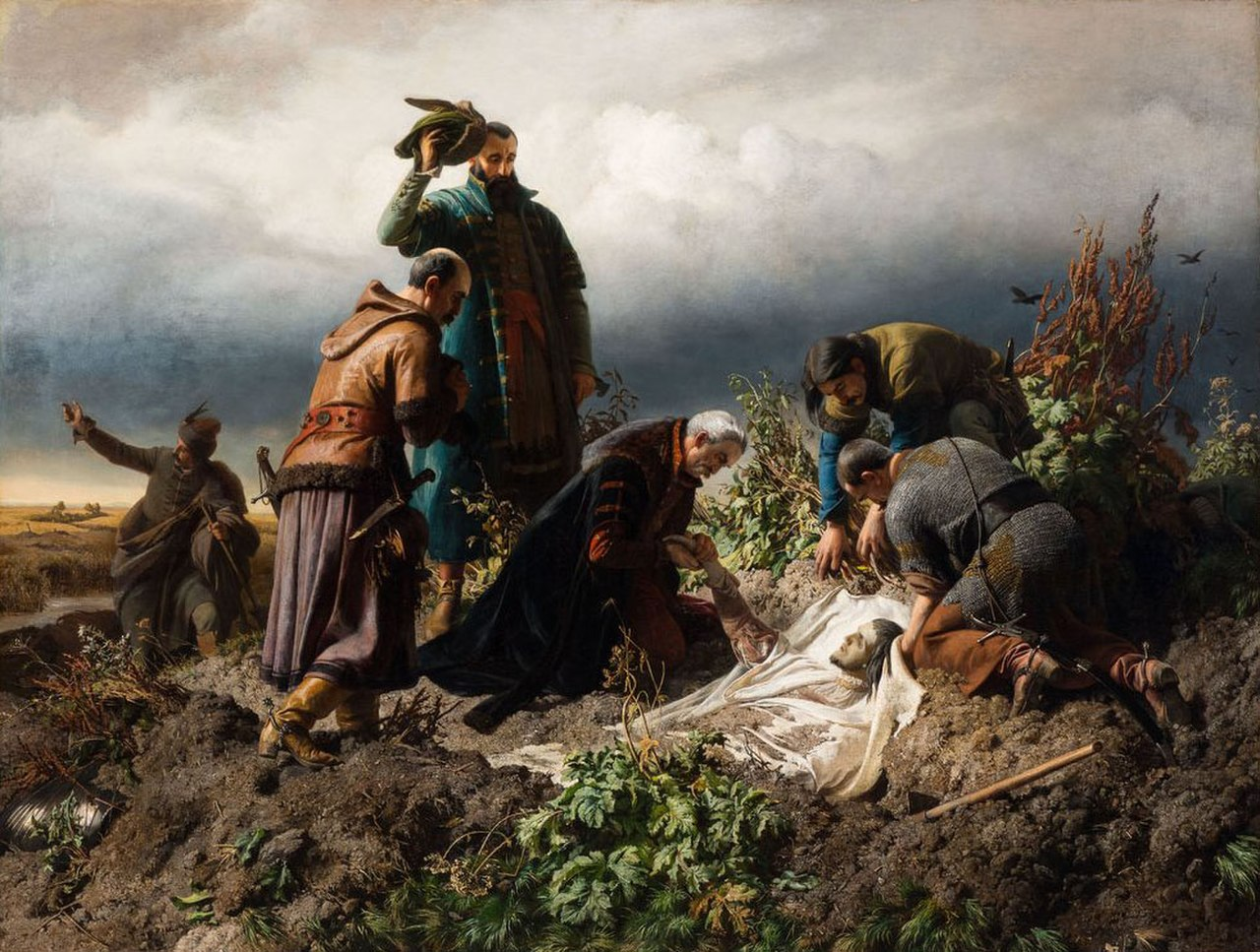
Discovering the Body of
King Louis II (1860)

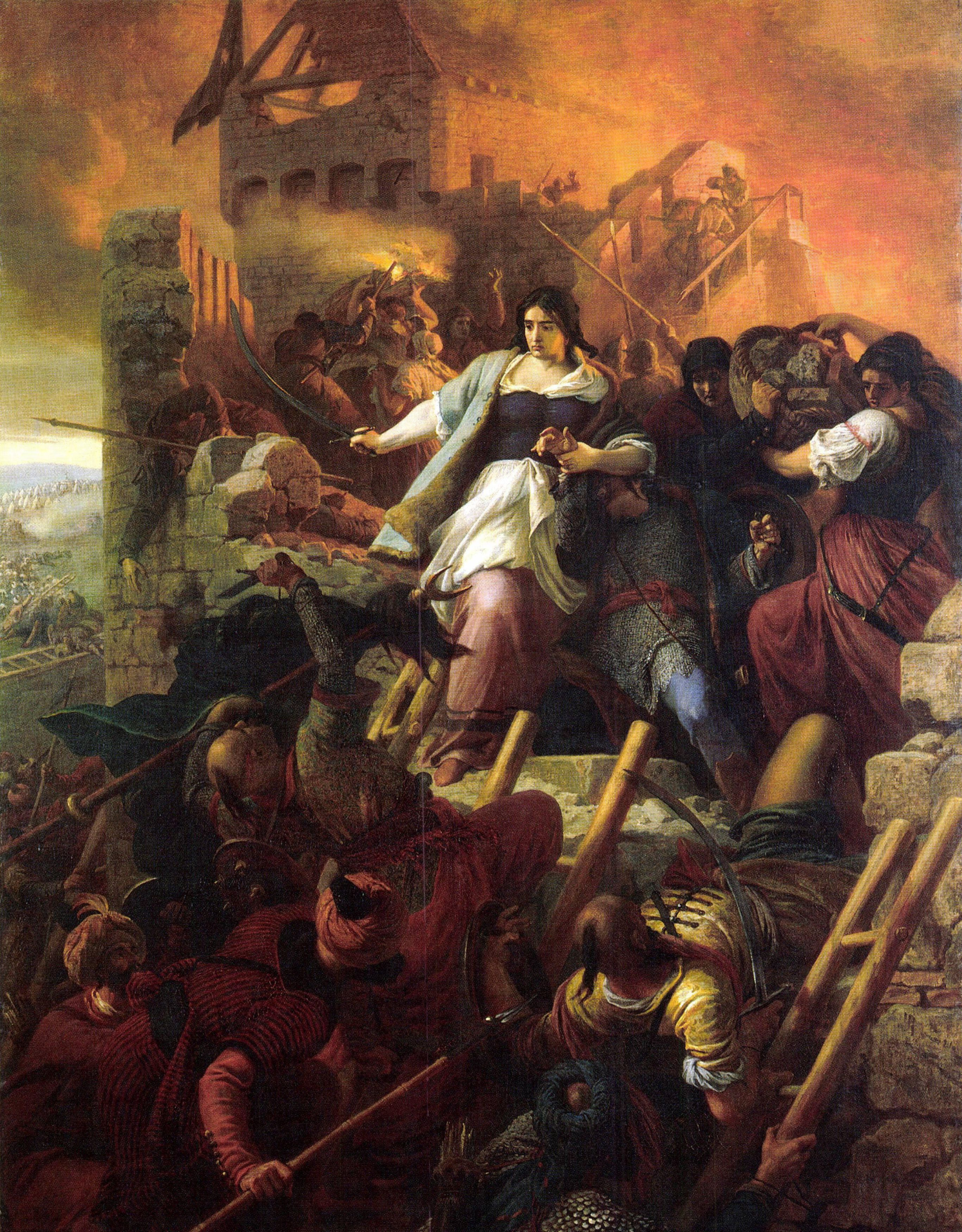
The Women of Eger (1867)

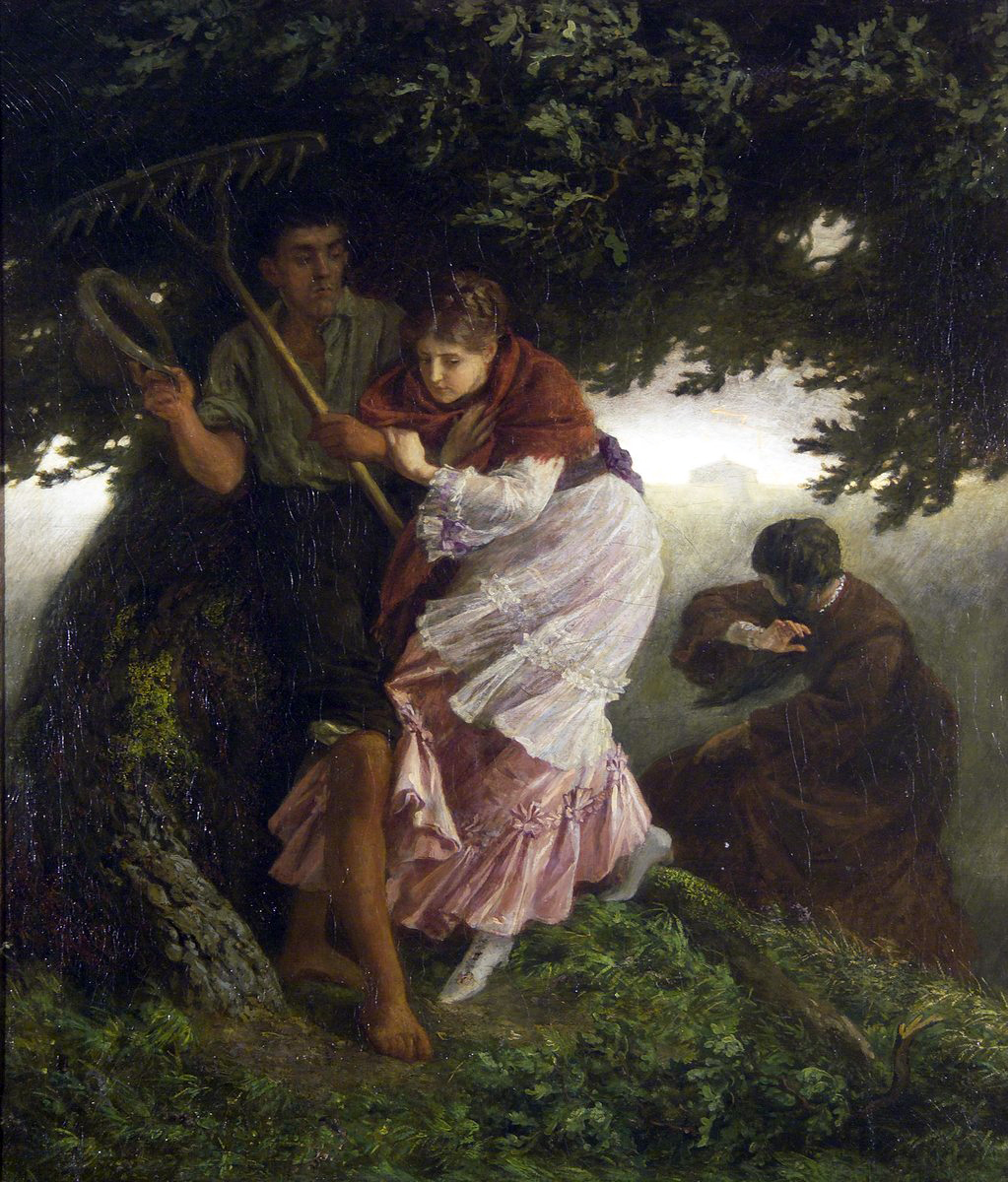
Thunderstorm (1875)

== Writings ==
- Székely Bertalan válogatott művészeti írásai (selected writings on art), introduction by László Maksay, Képzőművészeti Alap Kiadóvállalata, Budapest, 1962
