= Siculicidium =

1764 massacre

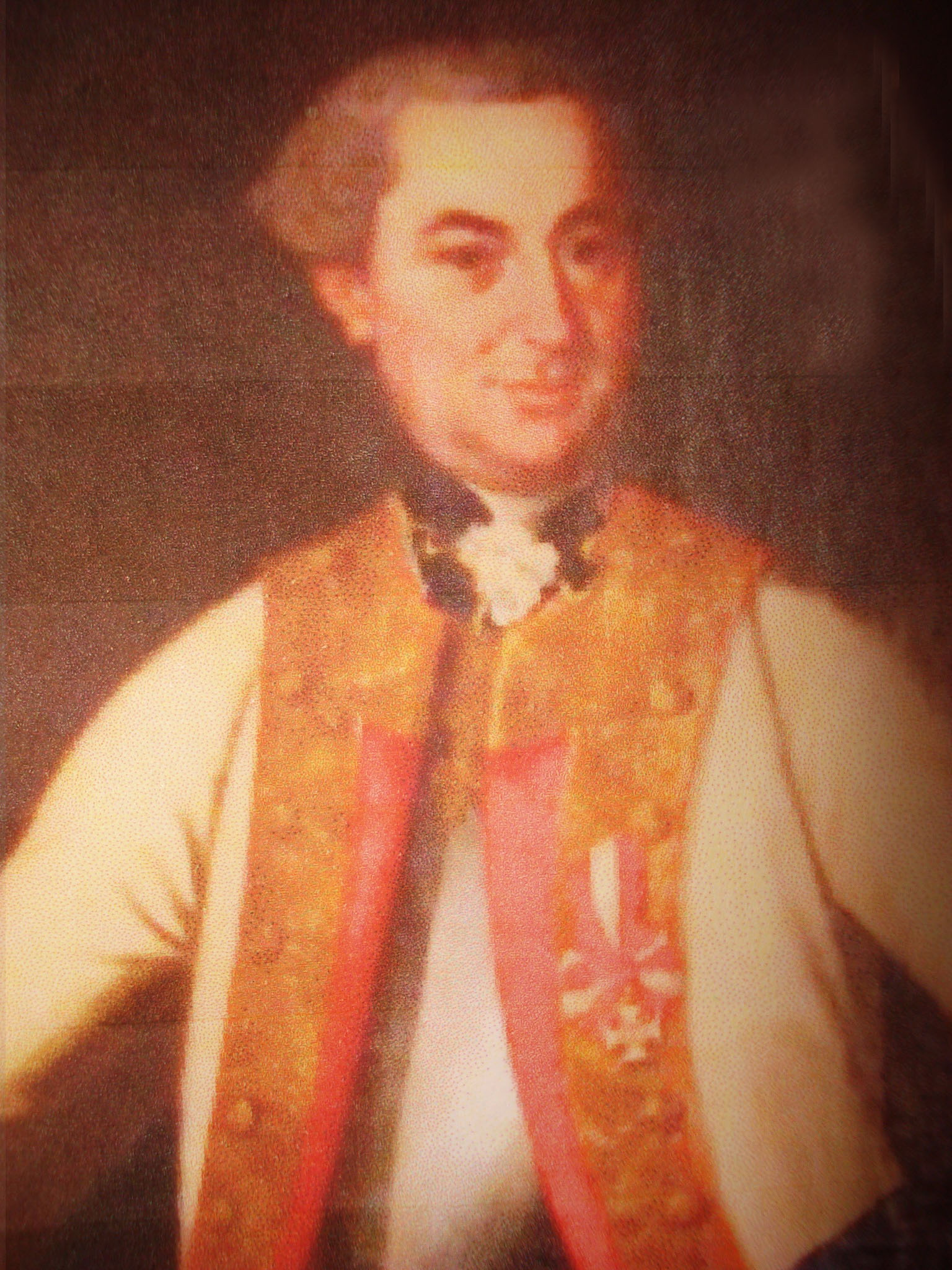
Habsburg army in Siculeni was commanded by general Joseph von Siskovich

The Massacre at Madéfalva took place at Csík-Mádéfalva, Grand Principality of Transylvania (today Siculeni in Romania). In Latin Siculicidium "murder of Székelys" was a mass murder committed against Székelys by the Habsburg army in 1764, under Maria Theresa.

== History ==
In 1763, the Court of Vienna entrusted general Adolf Nikolaus von Buccow to set up three Székely and two Romanian regiments to patrol the borders. However, the Székelys were unwilling to give up their hundred-year tradition of soldiering and their privileges. Thus, they resisted the forced military draft and organized a revolt against it. Maria Theresa appointed a new general, Joseph von Siskovics, who commanded his soldiers to attack Csík-Madéfalva (present-day Siculeni), where the Székely leaders were supposed to meet in a council. It was under the darkness of the snowy night of January 7, 1764 that the Habsburg soldiers entered the village and massacred about 400 unsuspecting people, including women and children.

== Consequences ==
The following days, the Székely leaders were captured and impeached, while thousands of terrified Székelys started to migrate to Moldavia, where they took refuge in the villages of the Csángómagyars who had been living there for centuries. In 1774, the Habsburg soldiers took control of an area of Moldavia that would eventually be named Bukovina and – after the intervention of Count András Hadik – they pardoned the Székelys there and settled them down. There, the Székelys founded settlements of their own. The five villages of the Székelys of Bukovina were: Istensegíts ("God help us!", now Ţibeni, 1776), Fogadjisten ("Accept God's will!", now Iacobești), Józseffalva (now Vornicenii Mari, 1785), Hadikfalva (now Dornești) and Andrásfalva (Măneuţi, 1786).

== Commemorations ==
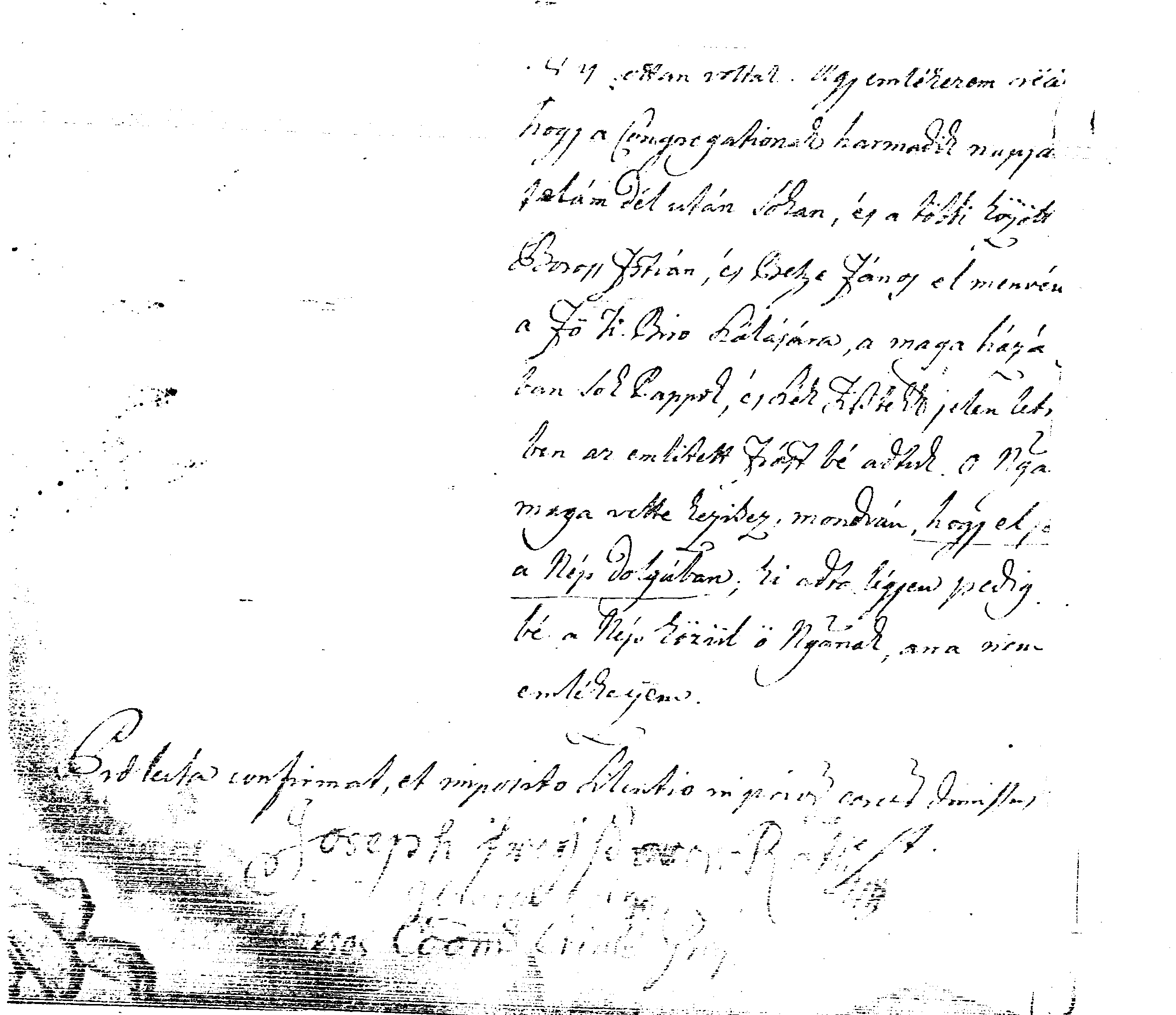
Original prosecution document with Roth Joseph signature

The chronogram of SICVLICIDIVM.

The events remained vivid in the Székely collective memory: in 1905, an obelisk was erected at Madéfalva, on its top carrying a Turul-bird with the wings spread. At the bottom of the stone-pyramid there is a plate with the word SICVLICIDIVM on it (adding up the values of the letters as Roman numerals, the result is exactly the year of the massacre).

Since the Székelys of Bukovina came into existence as a consequence of the events of January 7, 1764, they celebrate this day as the community's birthday.

== See also ==
- History of the Székely people
