= Székelys of Bukovina =

Hungarian ethnic community

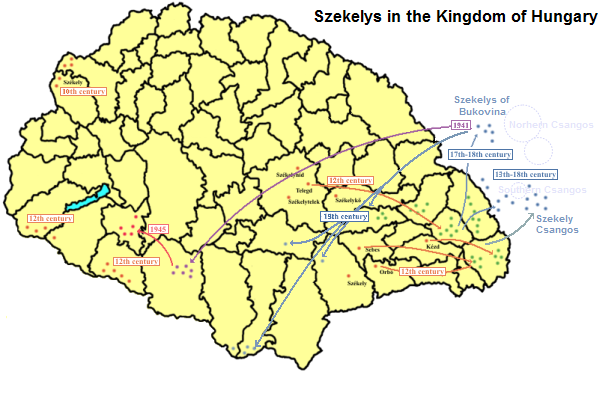
Migrations of the Székelys

The Székelys of Bukovina are a small Hungarian ethnic community with a complex history. They live today in three countries: in the Tolna and Baranya counties of Hungary; in Hunedoara County, Transylvania and Suceava County, Bukovina, both in Romania; and in the Serbian province of Vojvodina.

== Origins ==
Some Székely groups migrated from Transylvania to the province of Bukovina in the second half of the 18th century and established new villages, where they retained their distinctive culture and folk traditions into the 20th century. The migration was a reaction to the organization by the Habsburg monarchy of the Székely Frontier Zone, which jeopardized certain of the Székelys' ancient privileges and rights. The Székelys protested specifically against the forced military conscription at a gathering at Madéfalva (today Siculeni), which was forcibly dispersed by the Austrian General Josef Siskovics on 7 January 1764, in what came to be known as the Siculicidium or Massacre of the Székelys. More than 400 Székelys died. Thereafter about 1,000 Székelys migrated to Bukovina, then part of Moldavia and still under the suzerainty of the Ottoman Empire.

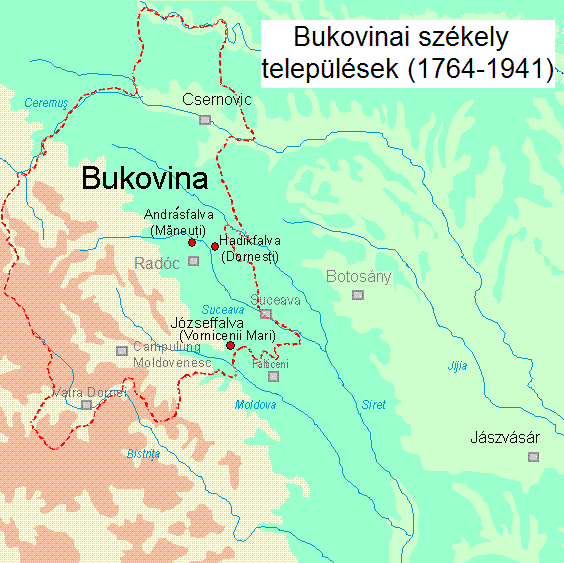
Székely villages in Bukovina

The occupation of northern Bukovina by Austria in 1774 brought a further wave of Székely immigration: another 100 families settled in the still sparsely populated territory in 1776, followed by a further 200 in 1784 and 1786, with assistance from Emperor Joseph II of Austria and Count András Hadik, governor of Transylvania. The new Bukovina Székely villages were named Istensegíts ("God help us", now Ţibeni), Fogadjisten ("God, welcome us!", now Iacobeşti), Józseffalva (now Vornicenii Mari), Hadikfalva (now Dornești) and Andrásfalva (now Măneuţi).

=== Cultural tradition ===
The Székelys of Bukovina maintained an archaic Hungarian folklore because of their isolation.

== Overpopulation ==
The population of the Bukovina Székelys tripled during the 19th century, reaching 9,887 in 1880 and about 16,000 by the end of the 1930s. This caused an acute shortage of farmland and a sharp fall in standards of living. Many Bukovina Székelys left the villages temporarily or permanently, some with official assistance. The Hungarian government settled 4,000 of these impoverished Székelys along the Lower Danube in the new villages of Hertelendyfalva, Sándoregyháza and Székelykeve in 1883, in a part of the Banat that was annexed by Yugoslavia in 1918 (nowadays belonging to Serbia). Other Székely families emigrated in that period to Canada, United States, Brazil, or cities in southern Transylvania.

== Resettlements ==
Bukovina became part of Romania under the 1920 Treaty of Trianon, and the impoverished Székelys soon found themselves oppressed culturally as well as economically, with no teaching in or of Hungarian in their schools. There was a general expectation of assistance from the "mother country" and increasing urgency after the Second Vienna Award of 1940 had caused widespread anti-Hungarian feeling in Bukovina. Hungary's 1941 invasion of Bačka (Bácska) in northwestern Serbia was followed quickly by the expulsion of postwar Serbian settlers and other measures of forced Magyarization, including resettlement of the Bukovina Székelys to the region. The whole community of 13,200 people left Romania under a treaty concluded between Hungary and Romania, by which the Bukovina Székelys lost their Romanian citizenship and almost all their possessions, receiving the confiscated possessions of displaced Serbs in Bačka and some charitable assistance in exchange. They were not resettled in their original village communities as they had expected, but spread about in small groups among 14 villages and hamlets. Those from Andrásfalva, for example, belonged to the Reformed Church, while the others were Roman Catholics.

The resettlement was short-lived. The tide of war turned and Hungary hurriedly evacuated Bačka on 8 October 1944. Most of the Bukovina Székelys managed to flee to Transdanubia before the vengeful Yugoslav partisan forces arrived, but again, they lost all of their property. Most were resettled in 1945–46 in the homes of expelled Germans (Danube Swabians) in villages in the Völgység district of Tolna and adjacent counties. Tensions between them and the residual German population have eased over the decades. The Székelys of Tolna remain proud of their history and folk customs.

== See also ==
- Székelys
- Bukovina
- Székelykeve

== Sources ==
- Andrásfalvy Bertalan: A bukovinai székelyek kultúrájáról (The culture of the Bukovina Székelys). In: Népi kultúra népi társadalom (Folk culture, folk society). A MTA Néprajzi Kutató Csoportjának yearbook, ed. Gyula Ortutay (Budapest: Akadémiai Kiadó, 1973), pp. 7–23.
- Enikő A. Sajti: Hungarians in the Voivodina 1918–1947 (Boulder, CO/Highland Lakes, NJ: Social Science Monographs/Atlantic Research and Publications, 2003), pp. 250–297 passim.
- Sebestyén Ádám: A bukovinai andrásfalvi székelyek élete és története Madéfalvától napjainkig (Life and history of the Bukovina Székelys of Andrásfalva from Madéfalva to the present day) (Szekszárd: Tolna Megyei Tanács VB. Művelődésügyi Osztálya, 1972).
- Sebestyén Ádám: A bukovinai székelység tegnap és ma (The Bukovina Székelys past and present). Szekszárd: Tolna Megyei Könyvtár, 1989.
