= Ilie Ivanciuc =

Romania international rugby union player

- Born: Ilie Ștefan Ivanciuc; 26 July 1971 (age 55) Moara, Romania
- Height: 179 cm (5 ft 10 in)
- Weight: 81 kg (179 lb)

Rugby union career
- Position: Fly-half
Senior career
Years	Team	Apps	(Points)
- CSM Suceava
International career
Years	Team	Apps	(Points)
1991–1995	Romania	6	(9)
Coaching career
- Years: Team
- 2016–2022: Modena Rugby Club
- 2022-: Rugby Carpi A.S.D.

Ilie Ștefan Ivanciuc (born 26 July 1971 in Moara) is a Romanian former rugby union player who played as a fly-half.

He is currently the coach of Italian club Rugby Carpi A.S.D.

== Club career ==
During his career Ivanciuc played for Romanian club Bucovina Suceava. and abroad in Italy for Viterbo and Modena.

== International career ==
Ivanciuc gathered 6 caps for Romania, from his debut in 1991 to his last game in 1995. He scored 2 penalties and 1 drop-goal during his international career, 9 points on aggregate. He was a member of his national side for the 2nd and 3rd Rugby World Cups in 1991 and 1995 and played 4 group matches and scored a penalty against Springboks in Pool A match held in Cape Town, on 30 May 1995 and a drop-goal against Wallabies on 3 June 1995 in the same pool.
