= Moara, Suceava =

Moara
- Commune
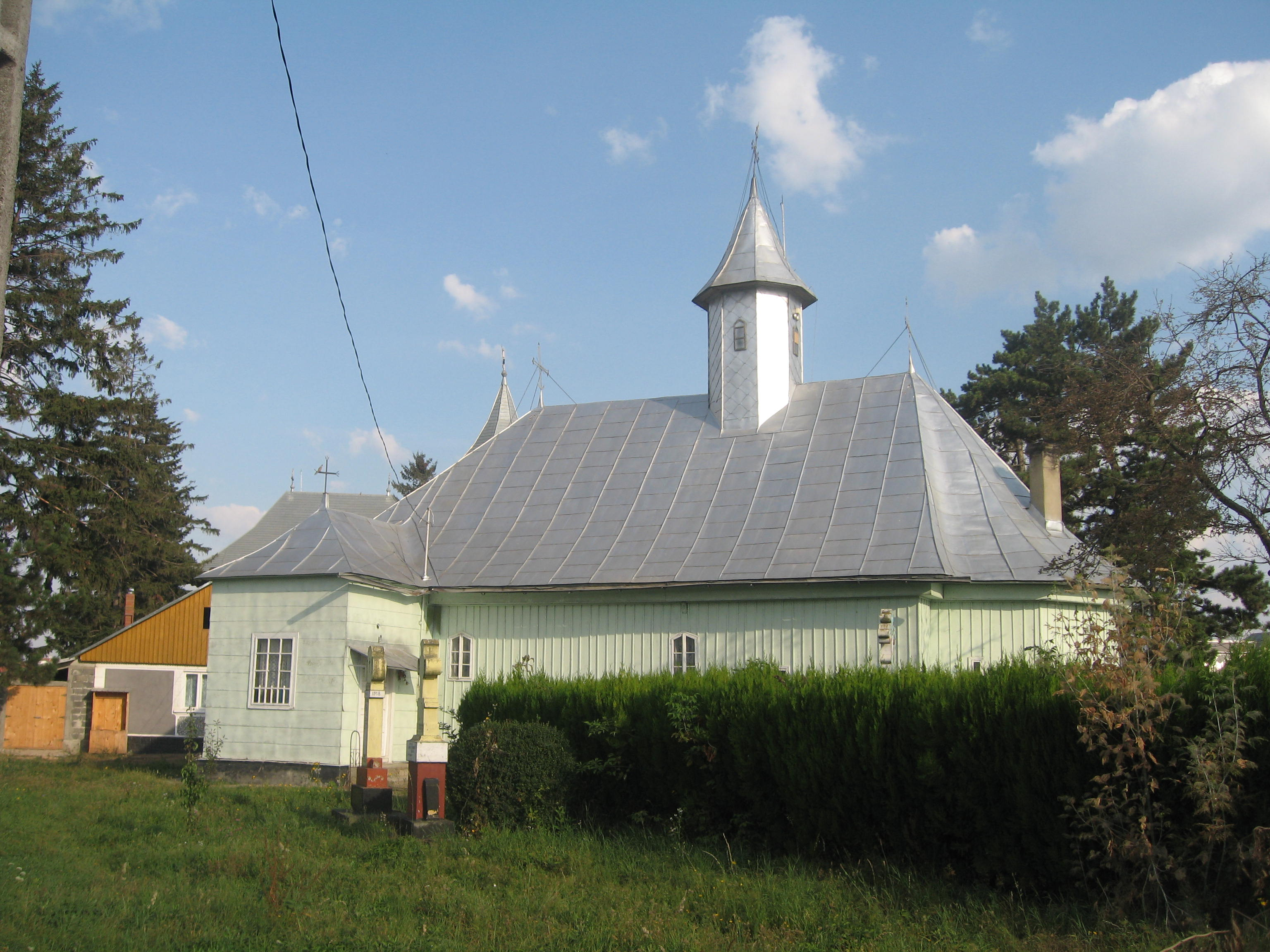
- Wooden Orthodox church in Moara

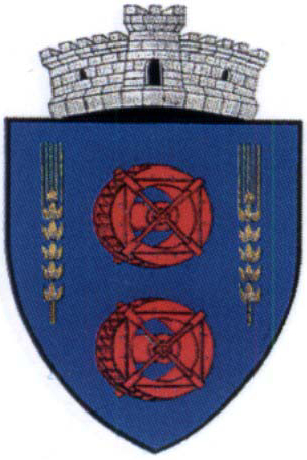
- Coat of arms

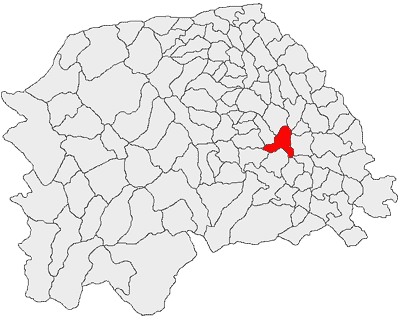
- Location in Suceava County

- Location in Romania
- Coordinates: 47°36′N 26°14′E
- Country: Romania
- County: Suceava

Government
  - Mayor (2024–2028): Eduard Dziminschi (PNL)
- Area: 46.86 km^{2} (18.09 sq mi)
- Elevation: 350 m (1,150 ft)
- Population (2021-12-01): 5,932
  - Density: 126.6/km^{2} (327.9/sq mi)
- Time zone: UTC+02:00 (EET)
  - Summer (DST): UTC+03:00 (EEST)
- Postal code: 727377
- Area code: +(40) 230
- Vehicle reg.: SV
- Website: www.comunamoara.ro

Moara is a commune located in Suceava County, Bukovina, northeastern Romania. It is composed of eight villages, namely: Bulai (Polish: Bulaja) Frumoasa, Groapa Vlădichii, Liteni, Moara Carp, Moara Nica (the commune centre), Vornicenii Mari (Hungarian: Józseffalva, German: Joseffalva or Josefalva), and Vornicenii Mici.

From 1785 to 1941, Vornicenii Mari village was inhabited by the Székelys of Bukovina.

== Administration and local politics ==
=== Communal council ===
The commune's current local council has the following political composition, according to the results of the 2020 Romanian local elections:

Party	Seats	Current Council
National Liberal Party (PNL)	12	
PRO Romania (PRO)	2	
Social Democratic Party (PSD)	1	

== Natives ==
- Ilie Ivanciuc (born 1971), former rugby union player
