= Siculeni =

Siculeni Madéfalva
- Commune
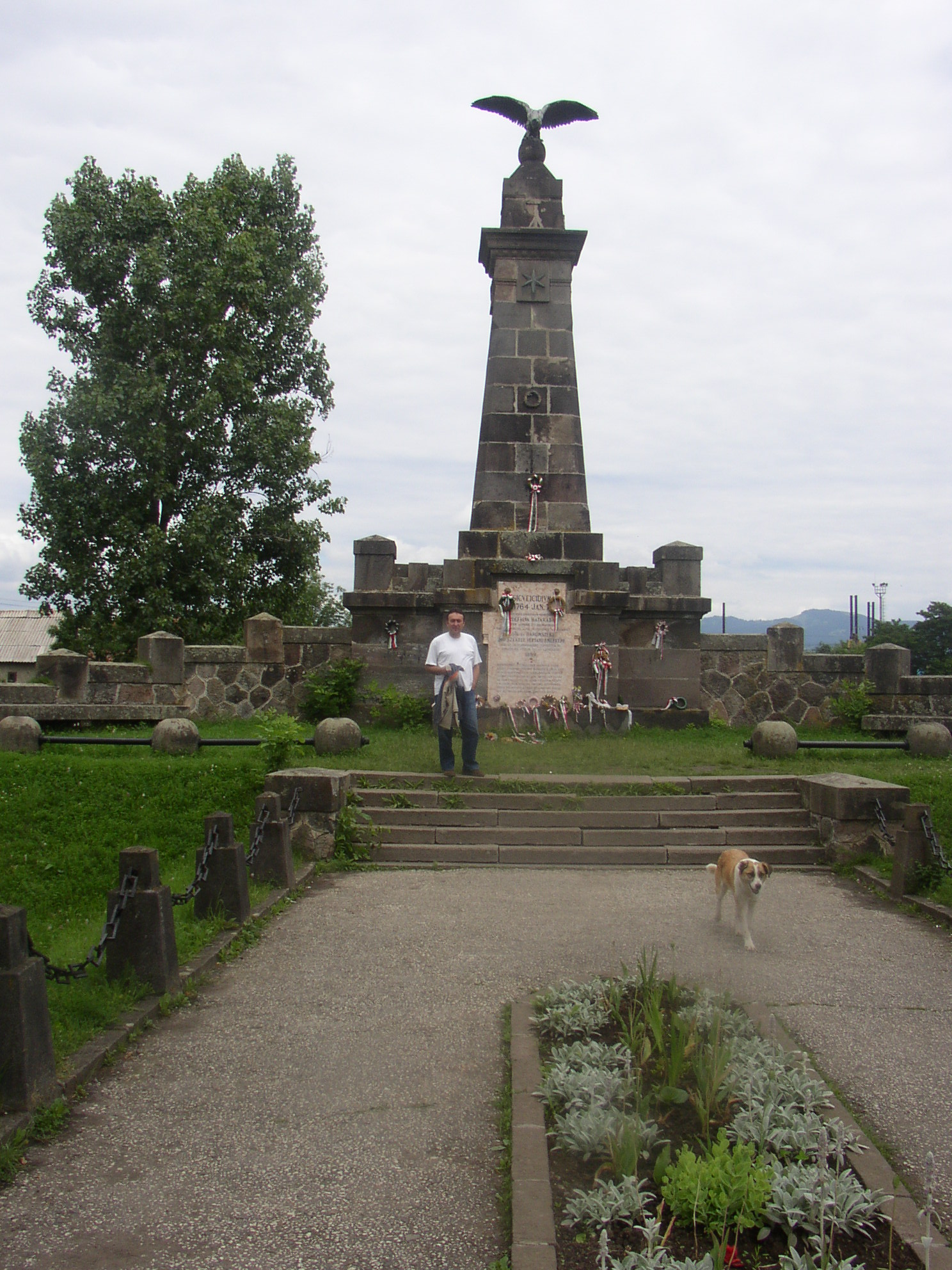
- Memorial of the Siculicidium

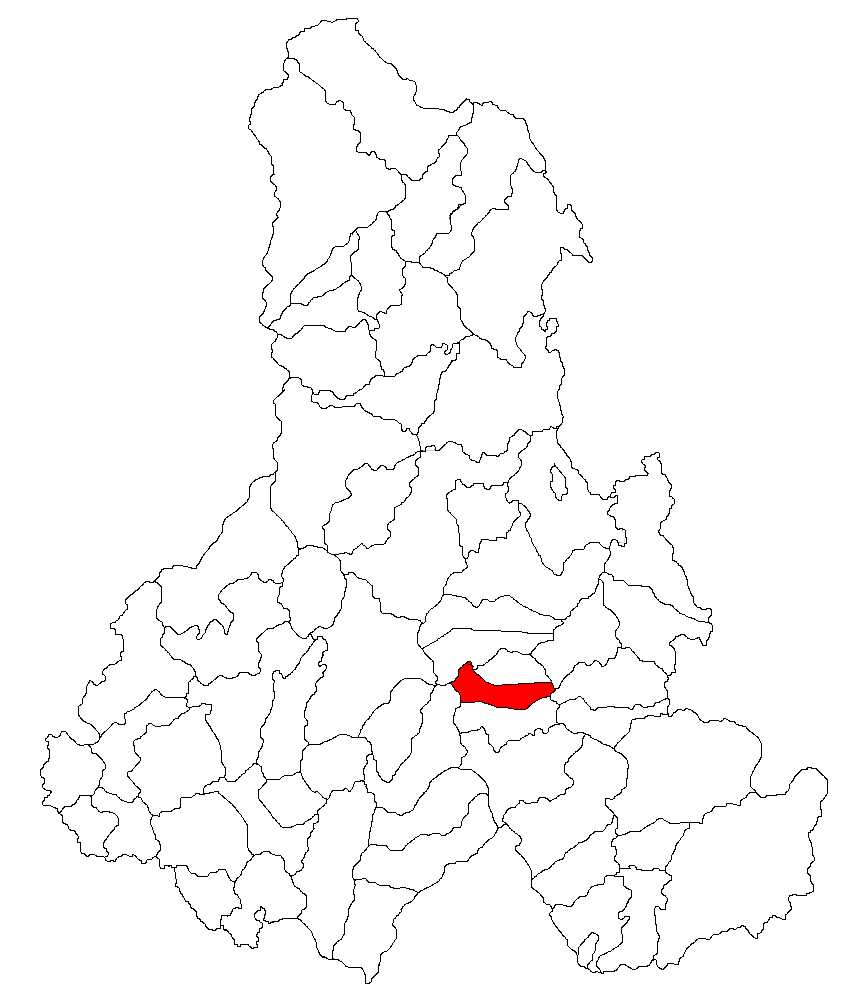
- Location in Harghita County

- Location in Romania
- Coordinates: 46°25′N 25°45′E
- Country: Romania
- County: Harghita

Government
  - Mayor (2020–2024): Csaba Szentes (UDMR)
- Area: 39.39 km^{2} (15.21 sq mi)
- Elevation: 699 m (2,293 ft)
- Population (2021-12-01): 2,511
  - Density: 63.75/km^{2} (165.1/sq mi)
- Time zone: UTC+02:00 (EET)
  - Summer (DST): UTC+03:00 (EEST)
- Postal code: 537295
- Area code: +(40) 266
- Vehicle reg.: HR
- Website: www.madefalva.ro

Siculeni (Hungarian: Madéfalva, Hungarian pronunciation: [ˈmɒdeːfɒlvɒ]) is a commune in Harghita County, Romania. It lies in the Székely Land, an ethno-cultural region in eastern Transylvania. The Siculicidium took place here.

The commune is composed of a single village, Siculeni. In 2004, four villages broke off to form Ciceu and Racu Communes.

== Demographics ==
According to the 2011 census, the commune had a population of 2,711; of these, 94.46% were Hungarians and 5.49% Romanians. At the 2021 census, Siculeni had 2,511 inhabitants, of which 90.68% were Hungarians, 3.82% Romanians, and 1.15% Roma.

== History ==
The mystical addition

The village was part of the Székely Land region of the historical Transylvania province.

Its Hungarian name was first recorded in 1567 in the form of Amadeffalwa (Amadé's village), and in 1602 the village was already mentioned in a shortened form as Madéfalva, which became the name of the village. Later, until 1899 the official name of the city was Csík-Mádéfalva. The Romanian form of its name was Madefalău; the authorities renamed it for the current official name after 1919.

The Siculicidium, or the Massacre at Madéfalva of January 7, 1764 took place here. Some 200 Székely were killed by Maria Theresa's Habsburg army as the local Székely Hungarians refused to join as recruits the newly organized borderguard regiments. Following the massacre, a great number of Székely people began to flee the region, crossing the Carpathian Mountains into Bukovina and Moldavia. The massacre's Latin name is Siculicidium, traditionally written as SICVLICIDIVM. A monument in memory of the massacre was erected on October 8, 1905.

The village administratively belonged to Csíkszék district until the administrative reform of Transylvania in 1876, when it fell within the Csík County in the Kingdom of Hungary. In the aftermath of World War I and the Hungarian–Romanian War of 1918–1919, it passed under Romanian administration; after the Treaty of Trianon of 1920, like the rest of Transylvania, it became part of the Kingdom of Romania. During the interwar period, Siculeni fell within plasa Centrală in Ciuc County. In 1940, the Second Vienna Award granted Northern Transylvania to Hungary and the commune was held by Hungary until September 1944. The territory of Northern Transylvania remained under Soviet military administration until March 9, 1945, after which it became again part of Romania. Between 1952 and 1960, Siculeni fell within the Magyar Autonomous Region, between 1960 and 1968 the Mureș-Magyar Autonomous Region. In 1968, Romania administration was organized in 42 counties, and since then, the commune has been part of Harghita County.

The commune used to comprise several villages, but since 2004 the village of Ciceu (Csicsó) forms an independent commune with the village of Ciaracio (Csaracsó). The village of Racu (Csíkrákos) along with the village of Satu Nou (Göröcsfalva) also forms an independent commune.

== See also ==
- History of the Székely people
