= Racu =

Racu Csíkrákos
- Commune
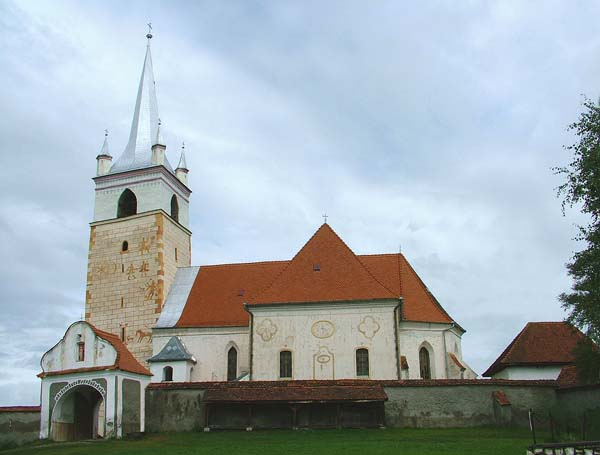
- Roman Catholic fortified church

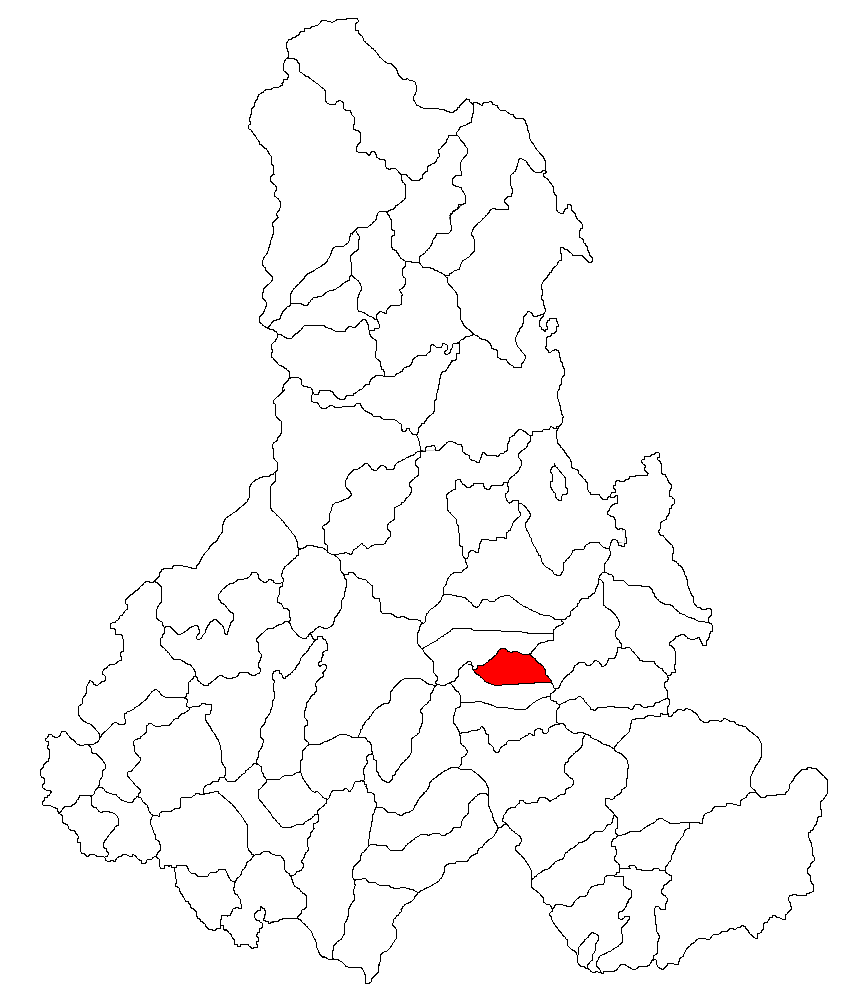
- Location in Harghita County

- Location in Romania
- Coordinates: 46°27′0″N 25°45′45″E
- Country: Romania
- County: Harghita

Government
  - Mayor (2020–2024): Attila Császár (UDMR)
- Population (2021-12-01): 1,599
- Time zone: UTC+02:00 (EET)
  - Summer (DST): UTC+03:00 (EEST)
- Postal code: 537225
- Area code: +40 266
- Vehicle reg.: HR
- Website: www.rakos.ro

Racu (Hungarian: Csíkrákos, Hungarian pronunciation: [ˈtʃiːkraːkoʃ], meaning "Place with the Crabs of Csík") is a commune in Harghita County, Transylvania, Romania. The commune is composed of two villages: Racu and Gârciu (Göröcsfalva); Gârciu was called Satu Nou from 1964 until 2011. Formerly part of Siculeni commune, the two villages broke off in 2004.

== History ==
The villages were part of the Székely Land region of the historical Transylvania province. They belonged to Csíkszék district. After the administrative reform of Transylvania in 1876, they fell within the Csík County in the Kingdom of Hungary. After the Treaty of Trianon of 1920, they became part of Romania and fell within Ciuc County during the interwar period. In 1940, the second Vienna Award granted Northern Transylvania to Hungary and the villages were held by Hungary until 1944. After Soviet occupation, the Romanian administration returned and the commune became officially part of Romania in 1947. Between 1952 and 1960, the commune fell within the Magyar Autonomous Region, between 1960 and 1968 the Mureș-Magyar Autonomous Region. In 1968, the province was abolished, and since then, the commune has been part of Harghita County.

== Demographics ==
The commune has an absolute Hungarian (Székely) majority. According to the 2011 census, it had a population of 1,587, of which 99.5% or 1,579 were Hungarians. At the 2011 census, there were 1,607 inhabitants, of which 97.76% were Hungarians. At the 2021 census, Racu had a population of 1,599; of those, 94.87% were Hungarians and 1.13% Roma.

== Twinnings ==
- Boda, Hungary
