= Szolnok (genus) =

Genus (gens) Szolnok
- Country: Kingdom of Hungary
- Founded: 1030s
- Founder: Szolnok
- Cadet branches: House of Bágyoni

Szolnok (Zounuk) was the name of a gens (Latin for "clan"; nemzetség in Hungarian) in the Kingdom of Hungary. The founder of the clan was the 11th-century royal official Szolnok, about whom Szolnok County, becoming its first ispán, was named. Beside that region, his descendants acquired lands Nógrád, Fejér and Baranya counties too.

== History ==
=== Origin ===
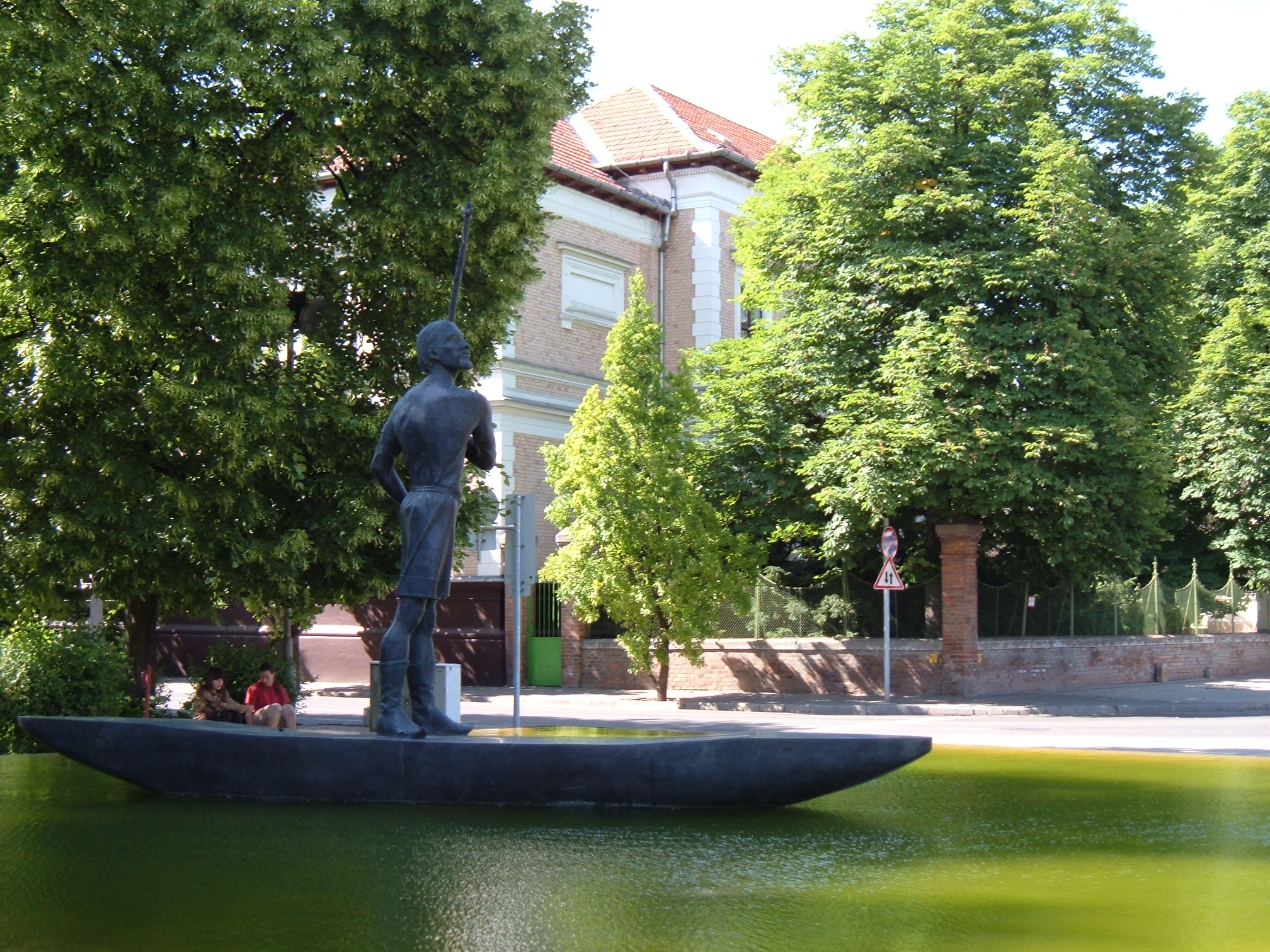
The statue of ispán Szolnok, founder of the clan, in the namesake town Szolnok

Szolnok was a member of the Hungarian elite during the reigns of Stephen I and Peter. László Bártfai Szabó assumed his Pecheneg origin. He was entrusted to build a castle (hillfort) at the confluence of the Tisza and Zagyva rivers, where he already possessed lands, which area was the crossroads of several trade routes (including salt from Transylvania). The castle, and consequently the emerging county and the town of Szolnok preserved his name to the present day. Szolnok was murdered during the Vata pagan uprising in 1046.

It is possible that his son was that Szolnok (II), who was an advisor of Duke Géza in the early 1070s. He, along with Petrud and Bikács, betrayed his lord just before the Battle of Kemej in February 1074, where King Solomon's troops routed Géza's army. However, ultimately, Géza won a decisive victory at the Battle of Mogyoród in March 1074. His betrayal resulted that his offspring lost significant power and influence, which was never recovered.

=== Possessions ===
By the middle of the 13th century, they possessed estates around Szolnok Castle, for instance, Szajol and Püspöki. According to historian György Györffy, they established the clan's monastery in Tenyő along the Tisza. A certain Gorgan from the kindred died without male descendants. Before his death, he bequeathed the estate Garábsáp near Nagyrév to the Dominican monastery of Pest. The Dominicans sold the estate to the Gyürki family in 1258, with the permission of Béla IV. It is possible that the Szentiványi, Tabajdi, Vanyarci, Szajoli, Mikebudai, Irsai, Nagyrévi, Vértesi, Sápi, Gyürki and Péteri families, which possessed portions in the surrounding lands, were all descended from the Szolnok clan.

In addition to Szolnok County, members of the kindred acquired lands in other parts of the Kingdom of Hungary. They possessed estates and portions in Pest County (Mikebuda, Érkusbuda, Irsa, Alberti, Dánszentmiklós), Nógrád County (Bágyon), Fejér County (Szentpétervámája or Egyházasváma, Hidegkút) and Győr County (Gönyű). They established a coherent unit of their estates in the southern part of Nógrád County by the mid-13th century. Three families – 1, comes Pázmány and his brother Szolnok (I); 2, Tenyő and his cousins, Gotthard, Alexander and Pousa (I); 3, Paul (I), son of Gera – divided their village Bágyon among themselves in 1260. This data clearly shows that the genus had until now an extensive kinship, which led to the fragmentation of the lands and thus to the complete cessation of political influence.

In 1264, Paul (I) sold three quarters of his portion to Pázmány in 1264. Peter (I), the son of Szolnok (I) was already a sick man and without male offspring around 1272. With the permission of Stephen V, he bequeathed his estates Szederkény in Baranya County and Zamara in Valkó County (near Aljmaš, Croatia) to the Dominican nunnery of Rabbits' Island in 1272. Peter died around 1280, and Ladislaus IV confirmed his donations in 1281. Leustach, son of comes Pázmány handed over the daughters' quarter (portions in Bágyon and Szabolcs) to his sister Elizabeth in 1276, with the consent of his kinship – Paul (II), Peter (I), Tenyő and his son Peter (II), Gotthard and his sons, and Pousa (II).

The Bágyoni family descended from Gotthard, through two of his six sons. His daughter was Elizabeth, who was granted her daughters' quarter (portion in Bágyon) from her brothers, Andrew and Kemény, in 1283. Her husband Ivan, son of Csernete sold the estate to Paul Gutai, thus part of the village was no longer in the hands of the Szolnok kindred. Andrew and Dominic was still alive in 1309. They and their sons were forced to agree to the sale because they could not afford to litigate.

== Family tree ==
The clan's Nógrád County (Bágyon) branch, based on János Karácsonyi and Pál Engel:

- N
  - comes Pázmány (fl. 1260–1264)
    - Leustach (fl. 1276)
    - Paul II (fl. 1276)
    - Elizabeth (fl. 1276) ∞ Peter, son of Bulcs
    - Petka (or Paraskeva; fl. 1276)
  - Szolnok I (fl. 1260)
    - Peter I (fl. 1272–1276; d. before 1281)
- N
  - N
    - Tenyő (Tunev; fl. 1260–1276)
      - Peter II (fl. 1276)
  - N
    - Gotthard (fl. 1260–1276) --> Bágyoni family
      - Kemény (fl. 1276–1283)
        - Peter III (fl. 1276)
      - Andrew I (fl. 1276–1309)
        - Simon I (fl. 1309)
        - James (fl. 1309)
        - Szolnok II (fl. 1309)
          - Stephen (fl. 1372)
        - Felician (fl. 1309)
      - Nicholas (fl. 1276–1283)
      - Ladislaus (fl. 1276–1283)
      - Dominic (fl. 1283–1309)
        - Paul (fl. 1309)
          - Simon II (fl. 1372)
          - Thomas (fl. 1372)
      - Stephen (fl. 1276–1283)
      - Elizabeth (fl. 1283) ∞ Ivan, son of Csernete
    - Alexander (fl. 1260)
    - Pousa I (fl. 1260)
- Gera
  - Paul I (fl. 1260–1264)
    - Pousa II (fl. 1264–1276)

== Sources ==
- Bagi, Gábor (1992). "Megjegyzések Szolnok ispán történetéhez [Notes on the Story of Ispán Szolnok]". Jászkunság (in Hungarian). 38 (5). Verseghy Ferenc Megyei Könyvtár: 27–30. ISSN 0448-9144.
- Karácsonyi, János (1901). A magyar nemzetségek a XIV. század közepéig. III. kötet [The Hungarian genera until the middle of the 14th century, Vol. 3] (in Hungarian). Hungarian Academy of Sciences.
- Kertész, Róbert (2014). "Szolnok az Árpád-korban: tények és eredmények [Szolnok in the Age of Árpáds: Facts and Results]". Archaeologia – Altum Castrum Online. MNM Visegrádi Mátyás Király Múzeum: 2–7.
