= Szolnok (ispán) =

Hungarian nobleman

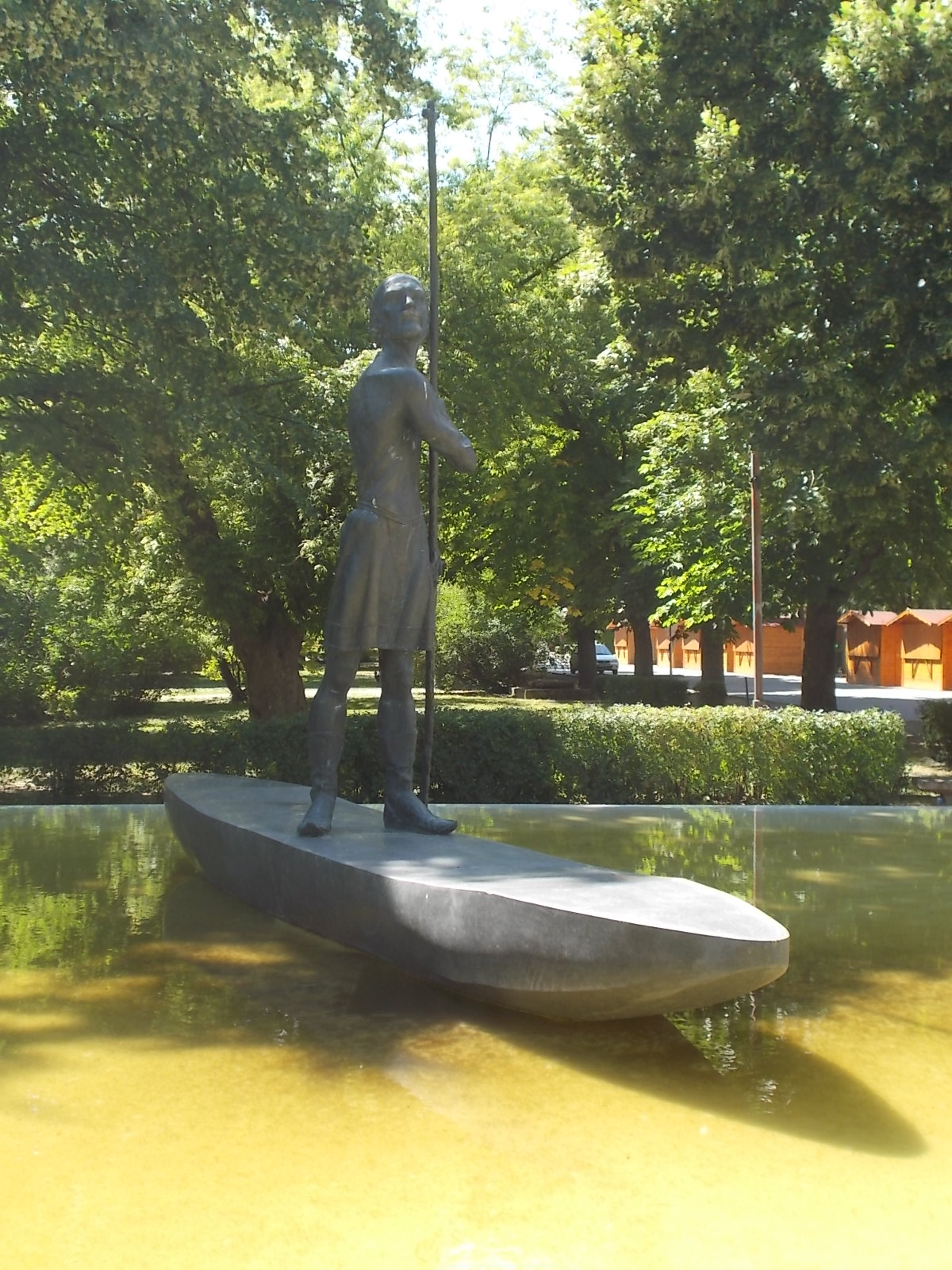
- Statue of ispán Szolnok in the namesake town by Benő Gábor Pogány (2001)

Ispán of Szolnok
- Reign: ?–1046
- Predecessor: first
- Successor: Eusidinus (1134)
- Died: 24 September 1046 at the Danube near Kelenföld (present-day Budapest)
- Noble family: gens Szolnok

Szolnok (also Zounok, Zonunc or Zaunic; killed 24 September 1046) was a Hungarian nobleman in the first half of the 11th century, who served as the first ispán of Szolnok County, which was named after him. Consequently, the town of Szolnok preserved his name to this day. He was killed during the Vata pagan uprising.

== Historical interpretations ==
According to historian Gábor Bagi, Szolnok represented the last generation of the royal officials who emerged during the reign of the first Hungarian king Stephen I. He was born in the early years of the 11th century. He plausibly held important positions in the royal court since the beginning of the 1030s. Local historian László Szabó claimed that his name is first mentioned in 1018, but there is no source for that. According to historian György Györffy, Stephen I entrusted Szolnok to establish a royal domain towards the end of his reign, in the second wave of the organization of counties sometime between 1018 and 1038. In contrast, Gyula Kristó considered that Szolnok County was established in the same time when the Diocese of Vác was founded, under the reign of Peter Orseolo, Stephen's successor. Accordingly, Szolnok built the namesake castle (a type of hillfort) at the confluence of the Tisza and Zagyva rivers, which area was the crossroads of several trade routes. The county, named after Szolnok and his newly erected fort, emerged from this castle district in the second half of the 11th century. Its castle folks were first mentioned by the founding charter of Garamszentbenedek Abbey (today Hronský Beňadik, Slovakia) in 1075, the county (or at least an ispánate) already existed at that time. However, the first known ispán, a certain Eusidinus, first appears in this capacity only in 1134.

Szolnok possessed inherited estates around the newly established castle district. His jurisdiction also extended to Northern Transylvania. Györffy assumed that Szolnok, beside his office of ispán, perhaps served as Voivode of Transylvania too, since the two positions were demonstrably combined from mid-13th century. Nevertheless, Szolnok could have had more power than the ordinary county administration official, because the Annales Altahenses refers to him as "princeps", instead of "comes". Under ispán Szolnok, the new emerging centre of royal power became one of the important stations for the transport of salt from the royal mines of Transylvania to the center, as it lay along the salt transport road. Some neighboring lands along the salt road located in Szabolcs, Bihar, Szatmár and Doboka counties were attached to Szolnok County. Kristó emphasized the military importance of the area. According to him, Peter entrusted the region to Szolnok to counter the pagan Vata's growing territory around Békés. Róbert Kertész shared this viewpoint, arguing that the establishment of Szolnok's fortress, which embodied royal power, in itself posed a serious threat to Vata, the lord of the area immediately adjacent to Szolnok County. It completely narrowed his room for maneuver to the north and northwest.

Based on the narration of the 14th-century Illuminated Chronicle, Szolnok was a devout Christian, who himself baptized people, including his future murderer Murtmur. Gábor Bagi considered Szolnok could carry out proselytizing activities at the behest of his monarch (Stephen I) in the Central Danube area, certainly before his commission in Szolnok. It is uncertain whose side he was on during the internal war between Peter and Samuel Aba. Initially, Kristó argued that Szolnok was an ardent partisan of Peter, belonging to the circle of Gerard of Csanád. László Szegfű, however, emphasized that Gerard fled the Republic of Venice because of his opposition to the Orseolos, therefore, it is not certain that the bishop would have been a supporter of King Peter. Based on Gerard's Deliberatio, historian József Gerics argued that the bishop, like most prelates and nobles, swore loyalty to Samuel Aba. Kristó, based on the narration of the Annales Altahenses, considered that Szolnok remained faithful to Peter until his murder. When the Vata pagan uprising broke out in 1046, Szolnok, as a member of the Hungarian elite, resided in Székesfehérvár, which closed its gates to Peter's troops. Consequently, archaeologist Róbert Kertész considered that Szolnok defected from the allegiance of Peter by that time, and was among those lords, who invited the exiled princes Levente and Andrew to the Hungarian throne during their meeting in Csanád (present-day Cenad, Romania).

== Death ==
As for ispán Szolnok, he mounted upon his horse, leapt into the Danube, and as he swam a certain man named Murtmur took him into his boat in order to save him from death. For this Murtmur had been baptized by ispán Szolnok. But when he wished to save the ispán's life, the heretics began to threaten him with death unless he himself killed ispán Szolnok. Frightened by these threats, Murtmur killed the ispán in the boat with his sword.

— Illuminated Chronicle

By the time the two brothers, Andrew and Levente, decided to return, a pagan revolt had broken out in Hungary. The princes made a casual alliance with the pagans led by Vata in order to defeat Peter. Their army marched into Pest. Upon learning of this, Gerard and three other prelates, in addition to Szolnok left Székesfehérvár to meet the princes and swear loyalty to them. However, the pagans captured and slaughtered them at the port of Pest, while attempted to cross the Danube (near present-day Kelenföld). Three sources mention the death of Szolnok. Regarding of the martyrdom of Gerard and his accompaniment, the contemporary Annales Altahenses says that "a noble (princeps) named Zaunic was also murdered with them". The major legend of Saint Gerard, compiled around 1340, also mentions his violent death, similarly to the entire company and entourage of the bishops. The most detailed account (see above quote) is provided by the 14th-century Illuminated Chronicle. Bagi considered that its text preserved a narration of a contemporary record or a lost variation of Gerard's hagiography.

Gyula Kristó considered that the murder of both Gerard and Szolnok indicate their personal opposition to Vata. The jurisdiction of both of them (the Diocese of Csanád and the County of Szolnok, respectively) bordered on the territory of Vata around Békés, whose power they threatened both on the ecclesiastical and secular side from the south and northwest. Kristó assumed that Vata's territory may have been affected by attempts at expansionist conversion from the sides of Gerard and Szolnok before 1046.

== Descendants ==
A certain Szolnok (Zounuk) was an advisor of Duke Géza in the early 1070s. He, along with Petrud and Bikács, betrayed his lord just before the Battle of Kemej in February 1074, where King Solomon's troops routed Géza's army. However, ultimately, Géza won a decisive victory at the Battle of Mogyoród in March 1074. Historians consider this Szolnok was the namesake son of ispán Szolnok. His betrayal resulted that his offspring lost significant power and influence, which was never recovered.

According to the tradition, the gens (clan) Szolnok descended from him. In the 13th century, they possessed estates around Szolnok Castle, for instance, Szajol and Püspöki. They established the clan's monastery in Tenyő. In addition, they owned some landholdings in Nógrád, Fejér and Baranya counties too.

== Sources ==
=== Primary sources ===
- Bak, János M.; Veszprémy, László; Kersken, Norbert (2018). Chronica de gestis Hungarorum e codice picto saec. XIV [The Illuminated Chronicle: Chronicle of the deeds of the Hungarians from the fourteenth-century illuminated codex]. Budapest: Central European University Press. ISBN 978-9-6338-6264-3.
- Klaniczay, Gábor; Csepregi, Ildikó, eds. (2023). Sanctitas Principum: Sancti Reges, Duces, Episcopi et Abbates Europae Centralis (Saec. xi–xiii) [The Sanctity of the Leaders: Holy Kings, Princes, Bishops, and Abbots from Central Europe (Eleventh–Thirteenth Centuries)]. Budapest–New York–Vienna: Central European University Press. ISBN 978-615-5225-28-4.

=== Secondary studies ===
- Bagi, Gábor (1992). "Megjegyzések Szolnok ispán történetéhez [Notes on the Story of Ispán Szolnok]". Jászkunság (in Hungarian). 38 (5). Verseghy Ferenc Megyei Könyvtár: 27–30. ISSN 0448-9144.
- Györffy, György (2013). István király és műve [King Stephen and his work] (in Hungarian). Balassi Kiadó. ISBN 978-963-506-896-8.
- Kertész, Róbert (2014). "Szolnok az Árpád-korban: tények és eredmények [Szolnok in the Age of Árpáds: Facts and Results]". Archaeologia – Altum Castrum Online. MNM Visegrádi Mátyás Király Múzeum: 2–7.
- Kertész, Róbert (2025). "Egy "királycsináló" a 11. század 40-es éveiben Magyarországon. A város- és megyealapító Szolnok ispán [A "Kingmaker" in the 1040s Hungary: Count Szolnok, Founder of a City and a County]". A női dimenzió – Femme Harmone. A Kortárs Női Reflexiók Fórumának folyóirata. 5 (2). Femme Harmone: 159–192. ISSN 2786-3905.
- Kristó, Gyula (1965). Karácsonyi, Béla (ed.). "Megjegyzések az ún. "pogánylázadások" kora történetéhez [Comments on the History of the so-called Age of "Pagan Rebellions"]". Acta Universitatis Szegediensis de Attila József nominatae. Acta Historica (in Hungarian). 18. MTA-SZTE-MOL Magyar Medievisztikai Kutatócsoport: 1–59. ISSN 0324-6965.
- Kristó, Gyula (1988). A vármegyék kialakulása Magyarországon [The formation of counties in Hungary]. Budapest: Magvető. ISBN 978-963-14-1189-8.
- Zsoldos, Attila (2011). Magyarország világi archontológiája, 1000–1301 [Secular Archontology of Hungary, 1000–1301] (in Hungarian). História, MTA Történettudományi Intézete. ISBN 978-963-9627-38-3.
