= Szolnok (disambiguation) =

Szolnok is a city with county rights in Hungary,

Szolnok may also refer to:

== Related to the city ==
- Szolnok (ispán), 11th-century Hungarian noble, the city was named after him
- Szolnok (genus), medieval Hungarian family, descendants of the aforementioned noble
- Szolnok County, a former administrative unit in the Kingdom of Hungary
- Szolnok District, a district of Jász-Nagykun-Szolnok County
- Szolnok Castle, the fort around which the city was built
- Szolnoki Olajbányász, a basketball team
- Szolnoki MÁV FC, a football team
- Szolnoki Vízilabda SC, a water polo team

== Other ==
- Abaújszolnok, a village in Hungary, formerly also known as "Szolnok"
