= Vata =

Vata may refer to:

== People ==
- Vata (noble), 11th-century Hungarian chieftain
- Vata (bishop of Várad), 12th-century Hungarian prelate
- Vata Matanu Garcia, former Angolan football striker
- Fatmir Vata (born 1971), Albanian footballer
- Rudi Vata (born 1969), Albanian footballer and manager

== Places ==
- Vata, Central African Republic
- Vața, a village in Vedea Commune, Argeș County, Romania
- Vața de Jos, a commune in Hunedoara County, Romania, and its village of Vața de Sus

== In religion ==
- Vāta, another name for Vāyu, Hindu deity, lord of the winds, father of Bhima
- A particular Zoroastrian divinity, one half of the pair Vata-Vayu

== Other uses ==
- Vata (beetle), a genus of ground beetles in the family Carabidae
- Vata pagan uprising, a Hungarian rebellion in 1046
- A dialect of the Dida language spoken in Ivory Coast
- One of the three elemental substances, or doshas, of the Ayurveda discipline of traditional medicine
- Collective of Vatnik, a pejorative term for supporters of the Russian government

== See also ==
- Vatta (disambiguation)
