= List of uprisings in Hungary =

The following list contains the upraisings in Hungary, the Kingdom of Hungary and the Principality of Transylvania in chronological order.

- 1046 – Vata pagan uprising
- 1061 – Second pagan uprising in Hungary
- 1437 – Transylvanian peasant revolt led by Antal Nagy de Buda
- 1492–93 – Revolt of the Black Army of Hungary
- 1514 – Peasant revolt led by György Dózsa
- 1526 – 1527 – Revolt led by Jovan Nenad
- 1572 – Croatian–Slovene Peasant Revolt
- 1562, 1575, 1595–96 – Szekler uprisings
- 1604 – Bocskai uprising
- 1631 – 1632 – Revolt led by Peter Császár
- 1672 - First kuruc uprising
- 1678 – Emeric Thököly's uprising
- 1697 – Hegyalja uprising
- 1703 – Rákóczi's War of Independence
- 1735 – 1736 – Uprising of Pera Segedinac
- 1784 – Revolt of Horea, Cloșca and Crișan
- 1831 – Cholera uprising in Hungary
- 1848 – Hungarian Revolution of 1848
- 1918 – Aster Revolution
- 1921 – Uprising in West Hungary
- 1956 – Hungarian Revolution of 1956
