= Eusidinus =

Hungarian nobleman

Ispán of Fejér
- Reign: 1138
- Predecessor: Thomas (1113)
- Successor: Seza (1166)
- Died: 1156/1158
- Father: Adrian

Eusidinus, also Euzidinus or Euscidius (Hungarian: Őszöd; died 1156/1158), was a Hungarian nobleman in the first half of the 12th century.

== Career ==
His father was a certain Adrian. He had a brother Stephen. Eusidinus was an influential member of the royal court during the reign of Béla II of Hungary. He served as ispán of Szolnok County in 1134. He is the first known office-holder after mid-11th-century noble Szolnok, the namesake of the castle and the county. Eusidinus was styled as ispán of Fejér County in 1138.

== Church founding ==
Eusidinus possessed lands in Bars County, for instance Barátka and Szántó (both laid in the territory of present-day Levice, Slovakia). Eusidinus built a Romanesque church in Barátka (Baratka or Bratka), dedicated to St. Martin of Tours, with three altars. He assigned three clerics and four liturgy books (missale, nocturnale, psalterium and graduale) there. The church was consecrated by Martyrius, Archbishop of Esztergom in 1156, in the presence of Eusidinus. Upon his request, the archbishop donated the villages of Barátka, Léva and Visk (today Levice and Vyškovce nad Ipľom in Slovakia) to the newly erected church, establishing its parochial area. Some historians, for instance, László Erdélyi and Richard Marsina considered Martyrius' charter (called as "Diploma of Eusidinus" in Hungarian historiography) as a 14th-century forgery, citing anachronistic elements in the text (e.g. the words parochia or missale). After a philological examination, Erzsébet Ladányi accepted the document as authentic.

Eusidinus died in 1157 or 1158. He had no male descendants. Géza II of Hungary, through ispán Gabriel, permitted his brother Stephen to donate the estates Barátka and Szántó with the above-mentioned church to the Garamszentbenedek Abbey (present-day Hronský Beňadik, Slovakia). The single-nave church was destroyed during the first Mongol invasion of Hungary, therefore, a new church, also a Romanesque one, was built next to its ruins sometime in the middle of the 13th century. Remains of both churches were excavated by Slovak archaeologist Alojz Habovštiak between 1958 and 1960.

== Sources ==
- Kubinyi, András (1975). "Királyi kancellária és udvari kápolna Magyarországon a XII. század közepén [Royal Chancery and Court Chapel in Hungary in the Middle of the 12th Century]". Levéltári Közlemények (in Hungarian). 46 (1). National Archives of Hungary: 59–121. ISSN 0024-1512.
- Ladányi, Erzsébet (1978). "Az Euzidinus-oklevél hitelességének kérdéséhez [On the Question of the Authenticity of the Charter of Euzidinus]". Levéltári Közlemények (in Hungarian). 48–49 (1–2). National Archives of Hungary: 51–59. ISSN 0024-1512.
- Zsoldos, Attila (2011). Magyarország világi archontológiája, 1000–1301 [Secular Archontology of Hungary, 1000–1301] (in Hungarian). História, MTA Történettudományi Intézete. ISBN 978-963-9627-38-3.
