= Gotthard Szolnok =

Hungarian nobleman

Vice-palatine for rex iunior Stephen
- Reign: 1264
- Died: after 1276
- Noble family: gens Szolnok
- Issue: Kemény; Andrew I Nicholas; Ladislaus; Dominic; Stephen; Elizabeth

Gotthard from the kindred Szolnok (Hungarian: Szolnok nembeli Gotárd; died after 1276) was a Hungarian noble in the middle of the 13th century, who served as vice-palatine in the court of rex iunior Stephen in 1264.

== Career ==
Gotthard (or Gothard) was born into the gens (clan) Szolnok, but his parentage is unknown. He had two brothers, Alexander and Pousa. Their branch acquired lands in Nógrád County around their centre Bágyon. The wider kinship divided their village Bágyon among themselves in 1260. Gotthard, his brothers and their cousin Tenyő were granted one-third portion of the village near Palotás and Gede.

Gotthard and his kinship swore loyalty to Duke Stephen during his internal conflict against his father, King Béla IV of Hungary. Gotthard was made vice-palatine in the court of the younger king shortly before the outbreak of the civil war between father and son. He is mentioned once in this capacity in 1264, serving under Palatine Denis Péc. Gotthard seated in Hatvan in Heves County, as Denis Péc exercised his rights of judging primarily in the southern parts of Stephen's kingdom. Gotthard was styled himself simply "vice Dyonisio palatino in Hotwan residens" during his sole surviving verdict. Tibor Szőcs argued Gotthard's role was not an occasional substitution but a permanent deputy of the palatine in the northeastern part of Stephen's realm.

He was still alive in 1276, when, alongside several members of the kindred including his adult sons, agreed to their relative Leustach to hand over the daughters' quarter (portions in Bágyon and Szabolcs) to his sister Elizabeth. The Bágyoni family descended from Gotthard, through two (Andrew and Dominic) of his six sons. His daughter was Elizabeth, who was granted her daughters' quarter (portion in Bágyon) from her brothers, Andrew and Kemény, in 1283. Her husband Ivan, son of Csernete sold the estate to Paul Gutai, thus part of the village was no longer in the hands of the Szolnok kindred. Andrew and Dominic was still alive in 1309. They and their sons were forced to agree to the sale because they could not afford to litigate.

== Sources ==
- Karácsonyi, János (1901). A magyar nemzetségek a XIV. század közepéig. III. kötet [The Hungarian genera until the middle of the 14th century, Vol. 3] (in Hungarian). Hungarian Academy of Sciences.
- Szőcs, Tibor (2014). A nádori intézmény korai története, 1000–1342 [An Early History of the Palatinal Institution: 1000–1342] (in Hungarian). Magyar Tudományos Akadémia Támogatott Kutatások Irodája. ISBN 978-963-508-697-9.
- Zsoldos, Attila (2011). Magyarország világi archontológiája, 1000–1301 [Secular Archontology of Hungary, 1000–1301] (in Hungarian). História, MTA Történettudományi Intézete. ISBN 978-963-9627-38-3.
