= Vatta (disambiguation) =

Vatta is a village in Borsod-Abaúj-Zemplén County, Hungary. Vatta may also refer to:

- Vatta's War, science fiction series by Elizabeth Moon
- Sergio Vatta (1937–2020), Italian football coach
- vaṭṭa, the three "rounds" into which mental states are divided in Buddhism, see Kleshas (Buddhism)

== See also ==
- Vata (disambiguation)
