= Second pagan uprising in Hungary =

1061 pagan uprising in Hungary

The second pagan revolt in Hungary in 1061 was the last pagan uprising against the new Christian and feudal state system in Hungary. Its leader, János, was supposedly Vata's son.

== Background ==
In the middle of the 11th century, a significant part of the country's population practiced their ancient faith, and many of the lords did not want to adopt the new religion. Andrew I returned to Hungary after the end of the fighting. He ceded a third of the country to Béla, who, based on the principle of seniority, expected to receive the entire kingdom after his brother's death. Andrew I, on the other hand, supported primogeniture, so he wanted to leave the crown to his infant son Solomon. The inheritance dispute led to a civil war, during which Béla defeated his brother in 1060, who was killed. Béla was crowned king, and in 1061 he convened a parliament in Székesfehérvár in order to strengthen his rule. In addition to the faithful nobility, many others demanded the restoration of the old order, including the destruction of Christian churches and the execution of Christian priests. They also wanted to restore the Hungarian pagan religion as the state religion. The rebels, led by Vata's son János, came from the eastern areas of the country.

== Revolt ==
On the order of King Béla, two elders from each village appeared in the meadows near Székesfehérvár in addition to the state nobles. The meeting descended into chaos as the pagans acted more and more aggressively towards the councilors. The lords and church dignitaries hid behind the castle walls. The pagans elected leaders and began to agitate against Christianity, and drew more people on their side. They sent ambassadors to Béla and renewed their demands. Béla asked for three days' patience while he considered their wishes, but in fact had no intention of doing so. Instead he gathered an army to crush the movement. The pagans trusted the king's word and did not suspect the trick, so those waiting outside the city walls began celebrating their victory. On the third day, royal troops brutally dispersed the crowd. Many were slaughtered or flogged. It is said that János died there.

== See also ==
- Vata pagan uprising
