= Palotás, Hungary =

Palotás
- Village (község)
- Location of Nograd County in Hungary

- Location of Patak in Hungary
- Coordinates: 47°47′41″N 19°35′55″E
- Country: Hungary
- Region: Northern Hungary
- County: Nógrád County
- Subregion: Pásztó

Government
  - Mayor: Mihály Szabó

Area
  - Total: 17.07 km^{2} (6.59 sq mi)

Population (1 Jan. 2015)
  - Total: 1,588
  - Density: 93.03/km^{2} (240.9/sq mi)
- Time zone: UTC+1 (CET)
  - Summer (DST): UTC+2 (CEST)
- Postal code: 3042
- Area code: 32

Palotás is a village in Nógrád County, Northern Hungary Region, Hungary.
