= Szajol =

- Village
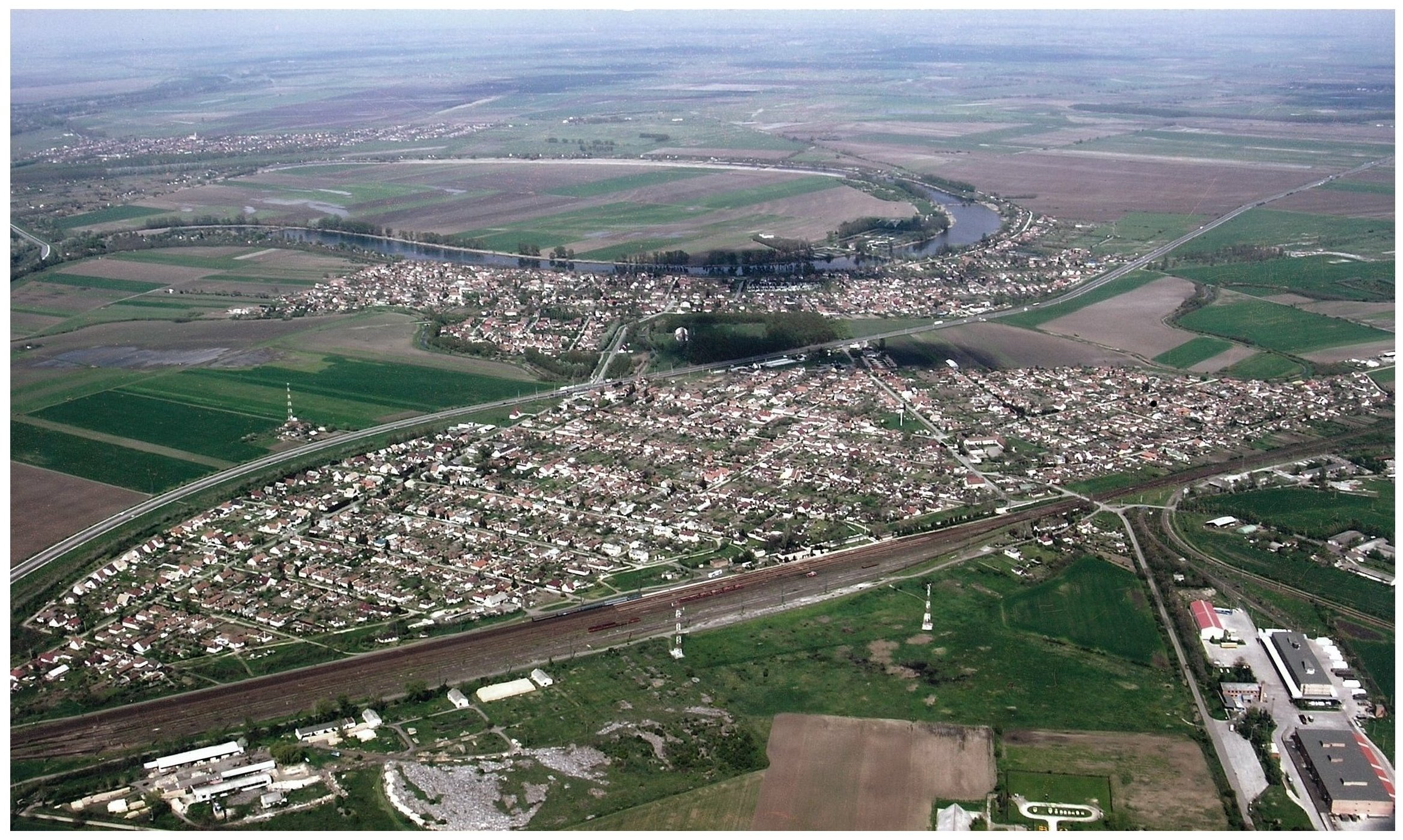
- Szajol from a bird's eye view

- Coat of arms

- Location within Hungary
- Coordinates: 47°10′41″N 20°18′11″E
- Country: Hungary
- County: Jász-Nagykun-Szolnok
- District: Szolnok

Area
  - Total: 36.97 km^{2} (14.27 sq mi)

Population (2015)
  - Total: 3,722
  - Density: 100.7/km^{2} (261/sq mi)
- Time zone: UTC+1 (CET)
  - Summer (DST): UTC+2 (CEST)
- Postal code: 5081
- Area code(s): (+36) 56

Szajol is a village in Jász-Nagykun-Szolnok county, in the Northern Great Plain region of central Hungary.

It is known for the 1994 railway disaster at Szajol station, killing 31 people and injuring 52 more.

== Geography ==
It covers an area of 36.97 km^{2} (14 sq mi) and has a population of 3722 people (2015).
