= Szolnok =

- City with county rights
- Szolnok Megyei Jogú Város
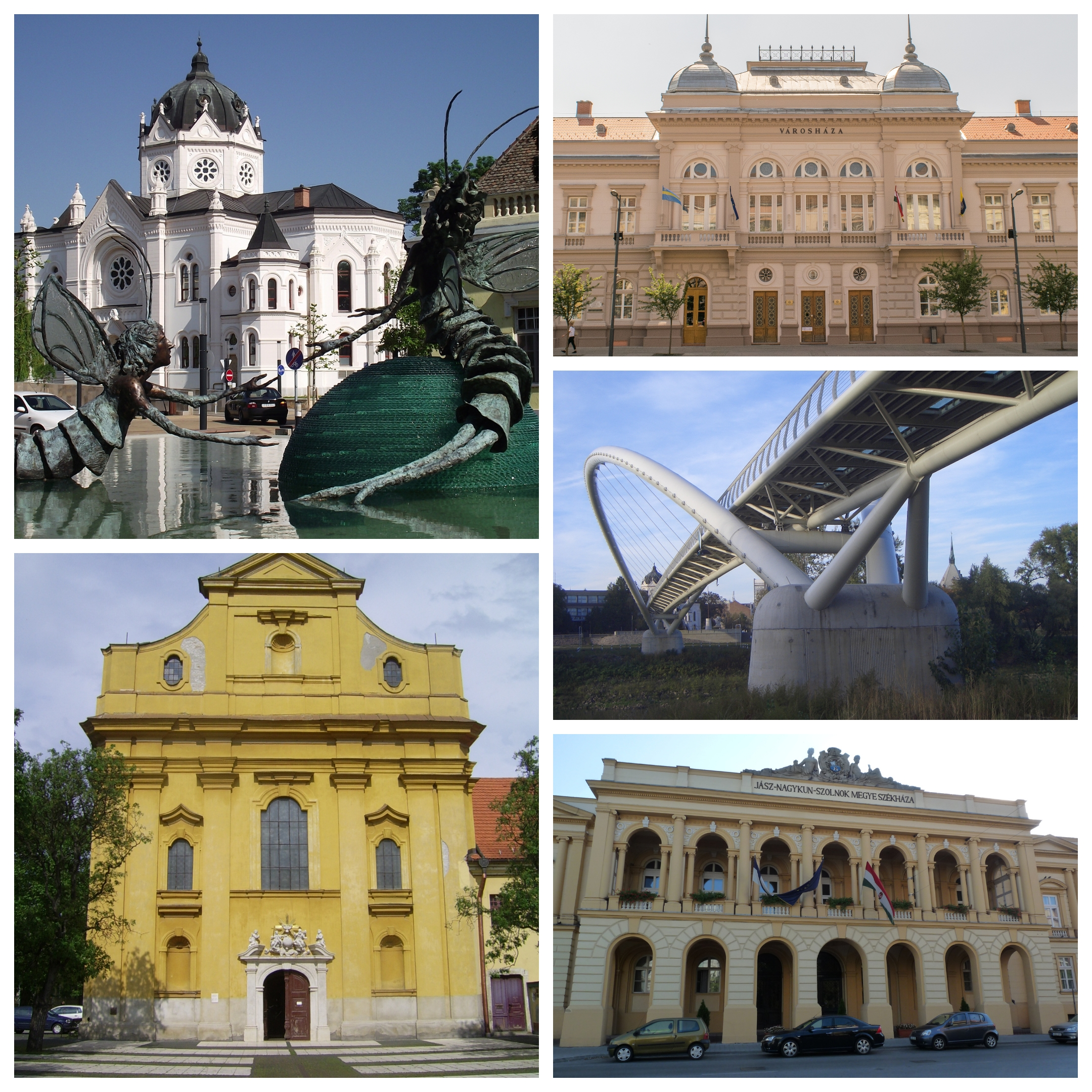

- Flag Coat of arms
- Nicknames: Capital of Tisza, Gate of Transtisza, City of Waters
- Location within Jász-Nagykun-Szolnok County Location within Hungary Location within Europe
- Coordinates: 47.17467°N 20.19649°E
- Country: Hungary
- County: Jász-Nagykun-Szolnok
- District: Szolnok

Government
  - Mayor: Mihály Györfi (MSZP, DK, Jobbik, Párbeszéd-ZÖLDEK, Momentum, Agóra Egyesület, Tegyünk Szolnokért Egyesület)

Area
  - Total: 187.24 km^{2} (72.29 sq mi)
- Elevation: 68 m (223 ft)

Population (2019)
  - Total: 71,285
  - Rank: 11th in Hungary
  - Density: 380.71/km^{2} (986.05/sq mi)
- Time zone: UTC+1 (CET)
  - Summer (DST): UTC+2 (CEST)
- Postal code: 5000 to 5008
- Area code: (+36) 56
- Website: info.szolnok.hu

Szolnok (Hungarian pronunciation: [ˈsolnok]; also known by alternative names) is the county seat of Jász-Nagykun-Szolnok county in central Hungary. A city with county rights, it is located on the banks of the Tisza river, in the heart of the Great Hungarian Plain, which has made it an important cultural and economic crossroads for centuries. Szolnok also has one of Hungary’s best water polo teams.

== Name and etymology ==
Szolnok was named after the first steward of the city, Szaunik or Zounok. The town was first officially mentioned under the name Zounok in 1075. In the following centuries, it was recorded variously as Zounok, Saunic, Zounuc, and Zawnuch. The variety of spellings likely comes from phonetic discrepancies occurring when Hungarian sounds were recorded using the Latin alphabet. Another possibility revolves around speculation that the name Szaunik was not a personal name after all, but rather a title relating to the significant salt trade (salt, Hungarian: só) in the area.

In most other languages, the city's Hungarian name is used without derivation (for example French: Szolnok, Spanish: Szolnok). The city has its own name in a few languages (for example German: Sollnock or Zolnock, Romanian: Solnoca, Russian: Сольнок), deriving from these languages' historical relationship to the city.

== Location and physical geography ==
Szolnok is located in the heart of the Great Hungarian Plain, at the confluence of the Tisza and Zagyva rivers. It lies about 100 kilometres (62 miles) east-southeast from Budapest. The climate of the area is continental, with hot summers following relatively mild winters. The region is one of the sunniest in Europe; the average precipitation is about 490 millimetres (19 in) annually.

=== Climate ===
Szolnok has a humid continental climate (Köppen: Dfa) closely bordering on a humid subtropical climate (Cfa). The annual average temperature of Szolnok is 11.4 °C (52.5 °F), and the warmest July has an average temperature of 22.6 °C (72.7 °F), while January is the only month below freezing, with an average temperature of −0.5 °C (31.1 °F). The annual precipitation is 531.7 millimetres (20.93 in), of which January is the month with the least precipitation at 25.4 millimetres (1.00 in), while June is the month with the most precipitation at 69.0 millimetres (2.72 in). Temperature extremes ranged from −24.5 °C (−12.1 °F) on January 13, 2003 to 40.4 °C (104.7 °F) on July 20, 2007.

Climate data for Szolnok, 1991−2020 normals
Month	Jan	Feb	Mar	Apr	May	Jun	Jul	Aug	Sep	Oct	Nov	Dec	Year
Record high °C (°F)	16.9 (62.4)	20.2 (68.4)	23.9 (75.0)	29.2 (84.6)	33.5 (92.3)	37.2 (99.0)	40.4 (104.7)	39.3 (102.7)	36.4 (97.5)	28.3 (82.9)	22.4 (72.3)	16.2 (61.2)	40.4 (104.7)
Mean daily maximum °C (°F)	2.6 (36.7)	5.5 (41.9)	11.5 (52.7)	17.6 (63.7)	22.7 (72.9)	26.5 (79.7)	28.7 (83.7)	28.7 (83.7)	23.0 (73.4)	16.7 (62.1)	9.5 (49.1)	3.4 (38.1)	16.4 (61.5)
Daily mean °C (°F)	−0.5 (31.1)	1.5 (34.7)	6.3 (43.3)	12.0 (53.6)	16.7 (62.1)	20.7 (69.3)	22.6 (72.7)	22.3 (72.1)	17.0 (62.6)	11.3 (52.3)	5.7 (42.3)	0.6 (33.1)	11.4 (52.5)
Mean daily minimum °C (°F)	−3.3 (26.1)	−2.4 (27.7)	1.6 (34.9)	6.3 (43.3)	10.9 (51.6)	14.9 (58.8)	16.4 (61.5)	16.2 (61.2)	11.8 (53.2)	6.8 (44.2)	2.4 (36.3)	−1.9 (28.6)	6.6 (43.9)
Record low °C (°F)	−24.8 (−12.6)	−21.1 (−6.0)	−12.8 (9.0)	−5.2 (22.6)	0.8 (33.4)	4.9 (40.8)	7.6 (45.7)	7.8 (46.0)	1.7 (35.1)	−7.2 (19.0)	−11.8 (10.8)	−20.3 (−4.5)	−24.8 (−12.6)
Average precipitation mm (inches)	25.4 (1.00)	30.1 (1.19)	25.8 (1.02)	37.9 (1.49)	55.3 (2.18)	69.0 (2.72)	65.5 (2.58)	52.2 (2.06)	51.3 (2.02)	41.9 (1.65)	38.4 (1.51)	38.9 (1.53)	531.7 (20.93)
Average precipitation days (≥ 1.0 mm)	5.5	5.9	5.5	6.2	8.2	7.3	6.6	5.6	6.4	5.9	6.6	7.0	76.7
Average relative humidity (%)	84.5	78.4	69.4	64.7	66.8	66.1	63.3	62.8	67.8	76.5	83.7	86.1	72.5
Mean monthly sunshine hours	60	96	148	186	247	261	283	265	200	153	75	52	2,025
Source 1: OMSZ (sun 1981-2010)
Source 2: NOAA

== History ==
=== Earliest settlement ===
The area was first settled in the Paleolithic era. The first known inhabitants lived in temporary tent-like structures made from reeds, or in more permanent dwellings made of hides draped over wooden poles. They were hunters of mammoth, reindeer, deer, and boar. Archeologists have also found stone tools from this era, some made of flint.

Fishing equipment such as hooks and weights from nets, dating from the Neolithic era, shows the increasing importance of fishing in the peoples' lives. These were usually made from clay, as were ritual statues of gods, bulls, and stylized women. In Szandaszőlős, a suburb of Szolnok, a permanent Neolithic era settlement was discovered.

By the Mesolithic era, the inhabitants of the area had settled into permanent villages, where they practiced agriculture and animal husbandry. Reconstructions of these settlements can be seen in Szolnok's Damjanich János Museum. The houses of this era were largely made of wood. They utilized carts for transporting goods and large earthenware granaries for storing grain.

In the Bronze Age, new people arrived in the Carpathian Basin. In Tószeg, a neighbor of Szolnok, a large settlement was established, with houses built with thick adobe walls. The villagers kept horses, pigs, and sheep, as well as collecting clams from the river. Certain artifacts have been found, such as bronze tools, swords, and shells, which suggest long-distance trade.

The Romans were not able to establish permanent settlements on the Alföld (modern-day eastern Hungary), so in the time before the arrival of the Hungarians in 896, the area was populated by Scythians, Celts, and Sarmatians. A number of artifacts have been found from the Scythian era in Szolnok and in the area surrounding it. During the building of the Zagyva River dikes, remnants of a Scythian settlement were found, including iron pots and other pottery.

The Celts followed the Scythians. Artifacts from the Celtic era include mostly weapons, including iron swords and shields, as well as saddlery and other iron components. Subsequently, the Sarmatians, who originated in Iran, settled in the surrounding area. The Sarmatian people were in contact with the Roman Empire, sometimes by war and sometimes by trade. Roman money, weapons, jewelry and pottery are often found; when Szolnok's military airport was enlarged in 1952, over two hundred Gepid and Sarmatian graves were uncovered, which contained rich treasures: gold-plated and decorated fibulas, iron weapons, bone combs, belt buckles, and pots. After the Sarmatians, Germanic-speaking peoples took possession of the area.

In Ó-Szanda, a district of Szolnok suburb Szandaszőlős, archeologists discovered a rich trove of artifacts left by the Gepids, who lived in the area in the 4th and 5th centuries. The Gepids were familiar with glass-making and wore heavy beads made from colored glass. After the Gepids, the area was populated by Avars. Like the Hungarian tribes who came later, the Avars were buried with their horses; a number of these graves have been unearthed. The remains discovered from the time of their rule indicates that the Avars first appeared in the middle of the 6th century. The burial grounds found at Rákóczifalva, some 1.5 kilometres (0.93 mi) from Szandaszőlős, show that a large permanent settlement once existed there.

It was an important distribution site of salt from Transylvanian region.

=== Middle Ages ===
Szolnok was first mentioned, under the name Zounok, in a letter from Géza I concerning the foundation of the monastery at Garamszentbenedek in 1075. It was named for the first steward of the city, Szaunik or Zounok. In the following centuries it was recorded as Zounok, Saunic, Zounuc, and Zawnuch. The variety of spellings likely comes from phonetic discrepancies occurring when Hungarian sounds - originally written in runic Old Hungarian script - were recorded using the Latin alphabet.

Under the rule of the Árpád Dynasty, Szolnok was a market town and the center of Szolnok County. When King István ordered a church built in every tenth village, one was built in Szolnok. The 11th century saw great improvements in the city due to the Tisza river ferry, customs house, and county business. There was great trade and commerce via both the Tisza and the overland roads that ran through Szolnok. Despite this, Szolnok remained a market town through the Middle Ages, without expanding to a city. The Szolnok Castle was, in these times, only an earthworks fort, although later a wooden wall was added.

During the Mongol invasion of Hungary in 1241 the town was destroyed; it was re-populated under King Béla IV but even by the end of the 14th century it was still considered a village. King Zsigmond of Luxemburg, in an effort to develop the town, freed Szolnok from certain taxes in 1422, and from customs in 1429. After this, the town slowly began to grow and prosper again.

=== In Ottoman Hungary ===
Due to Szolnok's geographical centrality, Szolnok Castle played an important role in the border castle system of 16th century Hungary. After the Ottoman armies captured Temesvár and occupied the Danube-Tisza-Maros River area, only two forces of any significance stood between them and the rest of Hungary: Szolnok, and Eger to the north. Beginning in June 1552, Hungarian, Transylvanian, and Viennese agents all began reporting that the Ottoman army was on the move out of Temesvár towards Szolnok and Eger. The task of capturing the two was given to Ali Pasha of Buda. After the fall of other minor fortifications on the Puszta, Sultan Suleiman the Magnificent ordered Pashas Ahmed, Ali, and Mohamed to lead their armies against the castles.

It was in light of this Turkish danger that in 1550-51 Ferdinand I ordered the Szolnok earthworks to be improved with a new town wall (partially planned by István Dobó), the castle to be fortified, and Lőrinc Nyáry put in command. Under his command were 1400 soldiers, mostly Spanish, German, Czech, with a small number of Hungarians. The castle was armed with 24 cannons, 3000 muskets, 800 weights of gunpowder, and was well-stocked with food and supplies.

Further works began in summer of 1552 and progressed rapidly. In order to surround the castle, a new branch of the Zagyva river was dug. This new branch is the one that remains today, at the point where the Zagyva flows into the Tisza river. The original course of the Zagyva has today been filled in, but a small part of it remains as the lake in front of the Szolnok MÁV Hospital.

On September 2, 1552, Pasha Ahmed Ali besieged the castle with his army of 40,000. Although it was the German mercenaries who first entertained thoughts of escape, it was the Hungarian boatmen who deserted first. On the night of September 3, the Hungarian and Spanish horsemen swam across the Tisza, then the boatmen returned for the foot soldiers. On the night of September 4, the mercenaries deserted, leaving the castle to its fate. After they departed the front gate was left open until morning, leading to the easy overpowering and capture of Lőrinc Nyáry and the fifty remaining brave men.

István Mekcsey, one of the defenders of the Siege of Eger, wrote the following to his sister four days before the Turkish advance forces reached Eger: "I can't write more... but to say that every day now we feel we are awaiting a great punishment since the traitors gave up Szolnok." Ahmed and Mohamed left a garrison of 2,000 soldiers in Szolnok while they marched against Eger.

The Ottoman occupation of Szolnok lasted from 1552 to 1685. In 1553, they established the sanjak of Szolnok, and in the following years built a mosque, baths, and a minaret; during the course of later battles these were destroyed, mostly deliberately. Of the minaret the base remained, and this was made into a stylized fountain which remains today. In 1562, they constructed the first permanent bridge spanning the Tisza. The remains of the so-called Szolnok Turkish-era Bridge (Hungarian: szolnoki török kori híd) again came to light in August 2003 after a summer of drought. The only Turkish codex made in Hungary was copied in Szolnok; it describes the campaigns of Suleiman in Hungary. Pottery and tools from the Turkish era can be seen today in Szolnok's Damjanich János Museum.

=== Post-Ottoman Szolnok ===
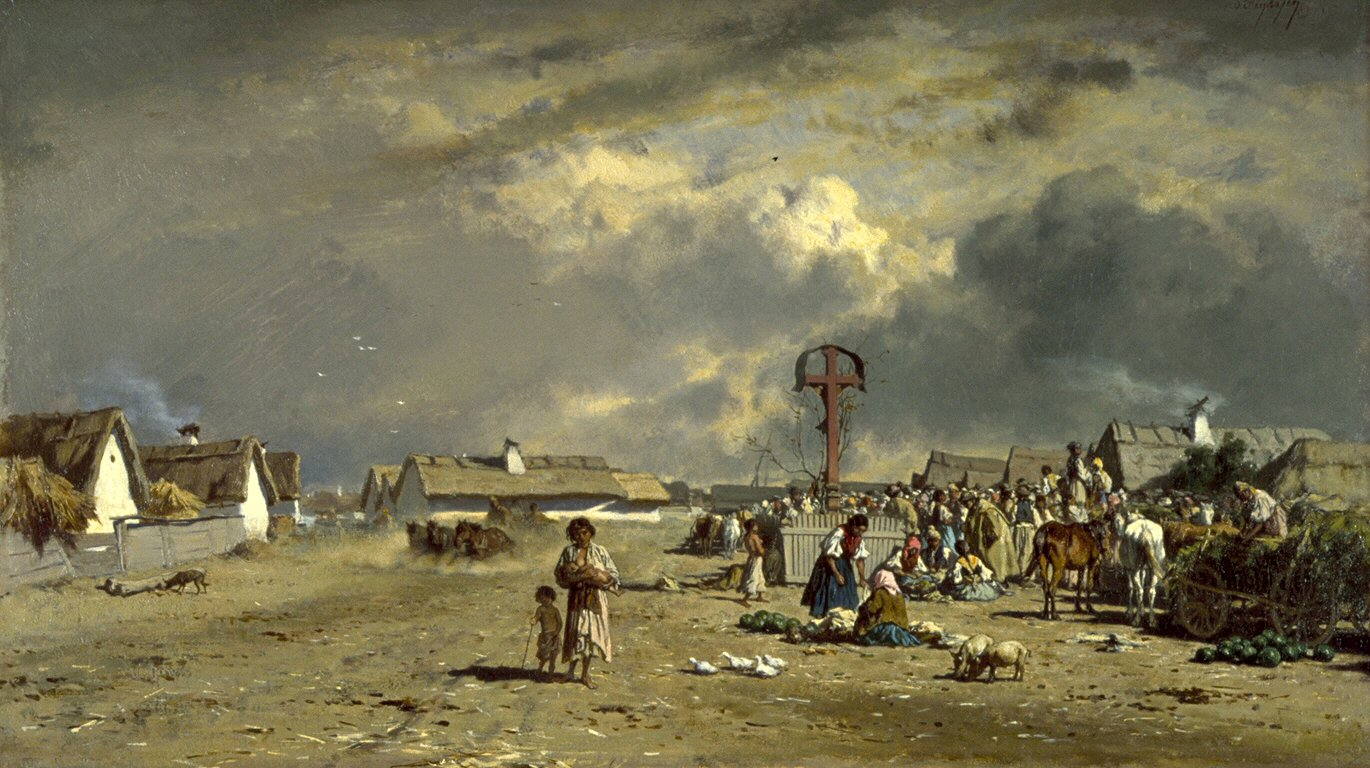
Szolnok was an important market center of 11,000 inhabitants in the mid 19th century. The Walters Art Museum.

In 1685, Szolnok was liberated from the Ottomans by the Habsburg armies under the control of Generals Heister and Mercy; during the liberation both the city and the castle were significantly damaged. Due to Szolnok castle's strategic importance, it was rebuilt by commander Antonio Caraffa.

In 1697, Imre Thököly burned down the castle. The events of the Rákóczi Uprising in 1703 and 1706 reached Szolnok and the city was again razed to the ground. In 1706, Ferenc Deák, one of Rákóczi's leaders, burned the Szolnok castle so that Imperial forces couldn't use it, so Imperial General Rabutin had the stones all taken away. In 1710, forces loyal to Rákóczi took over the castle, but on October 10, they abandoned it to the advancing army of Imperial General Jacob Joseph Cusani. After the Uprising, the castle finally fell to pieces and the stones were carted away.

In the years after, the city of Szolnok fared little better than the castle; it was hit by disaster after disaster, including a massive storm in 1739 which devastated the city. During the storm a fire broke out which, aided by the storm winds, grew and engulfed the majority of the town. The only buildings which were spared were those which were isolated from the town center.

Szolnok started to prosper again in the second half of the 18th century. Control of the river Tisza and steamship traffic increased the town's importance. From 1847 Szolnok was connected to Pest by railway.

Its citizens took part in the Hungarian Revolution of 1848 in 1848-49. In the Battle of Szolnok, the Austrians were defeated by the armies of General János Damjanich.

After the Ausgleich, the population and importance of Szolnok grew. In 1876, Szolnok became capital of the comitatus again. By 1879, it already had 16,001 residents.

=== 20th century ===
Szolnok saw action in the First World War in May 1919 when a long and bitter battle raged along the Tisza between the advancing Romanian army and the Hungarian Red Army. Romanian troops caused terrible damage to the area as the front stagnated here for 77 days. After the defeat of the Red Army in July 1919 in the Tiszántúl (the regions east of Szolnok), the Romanians crossed the Tisza and occupied the city. The occupation lasted until February 25, 1920. The railroad bridge, which had been destroyed during the battle, was finally reconstructed in 1923.

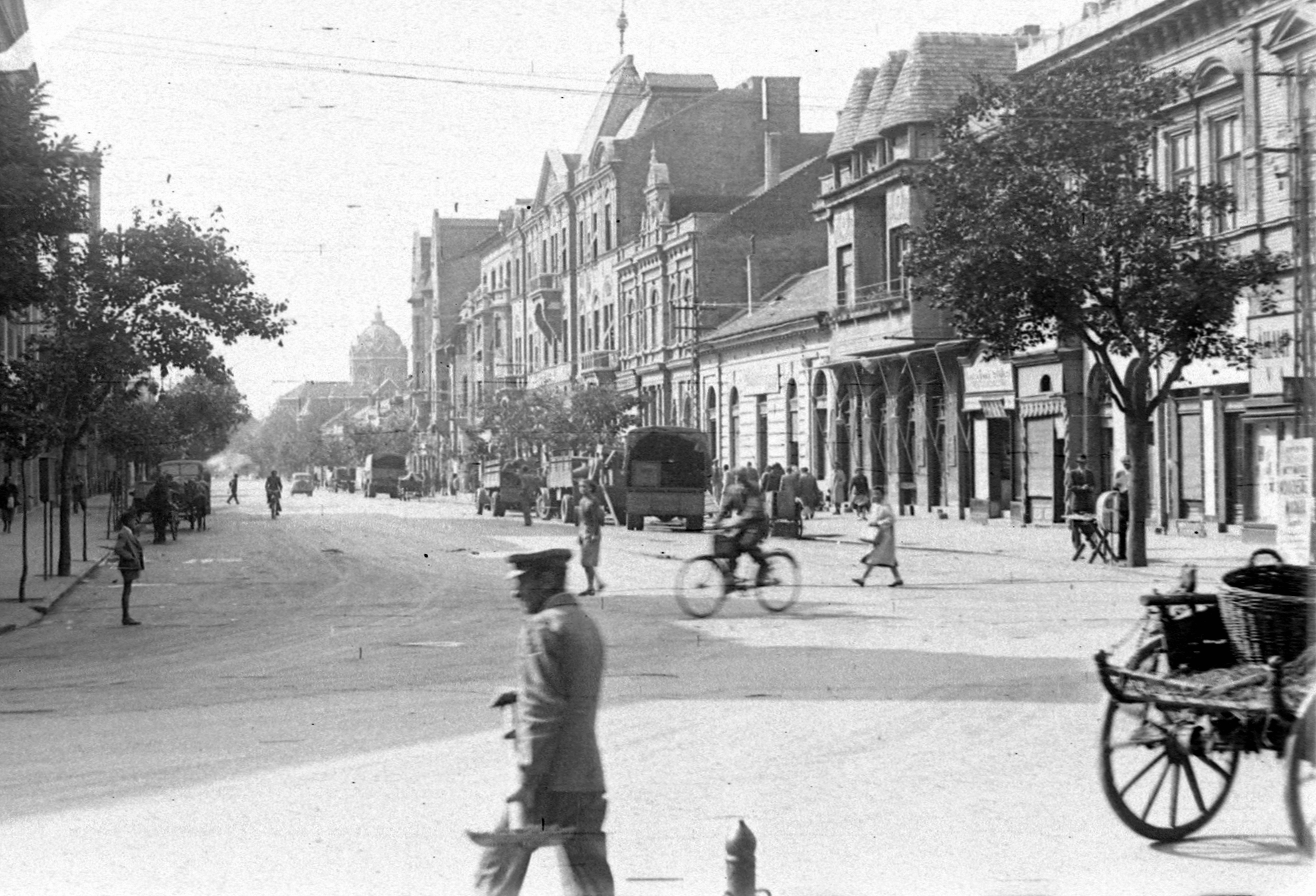
Szolnok in 1960

In 1930, the city had 38,764 inhabitants. Several higher level educational institutions existed, including boys' and girls' grammar schools, a scientific secondary school, trade schools for boys and girls both, lumber- and metal-works vocational school, and a midwifery training institute. The interwar period saw a surge in industry, including factories for weights, mirrors, furniture, vinegar spirits, rum, and liquor, ice, cotton wool, bricks, sugar; smelting furnace and metalworks factory; machinery factory and iron foundry; two electrical distribution systems; four lumber mills; and four steam mills.

In the interwar period, most of the damage done to the city had been successfully repaired. During World War II, Szolnok was bombed twelve times, mostly by American troops, which caused serious damage to the buildings and the population. In the so-called "Frantic" attack (June 2 - September 19, 1944) a wave of 600 fighter planes bombed Debrecen; the right wing also bombed Nagyvárad (now Oradea), Kolozsvár (now Cluj Napoca), Szeged, and Balmazújváros, and the left wing Szolnok and Miskolc. Szolnok suffered great damaged under these attacks and many people died. The train station of Szolnok was bombed several times, by both British and American fighters.

During 1944, it became the location of a "labor camp" and a concentration point for Hungarian Jews being deported to Mauthausen in Austria. It was critical to the success of the Hungarian Jews roundup and deportion.

By the end of the war, the majority of the population had fled; the Soviet troops of the 2nd Ukrainian Front found only a couple thousand people when they entered the decimated city on 4 November 1944, in the course of the Budapest Offensive.

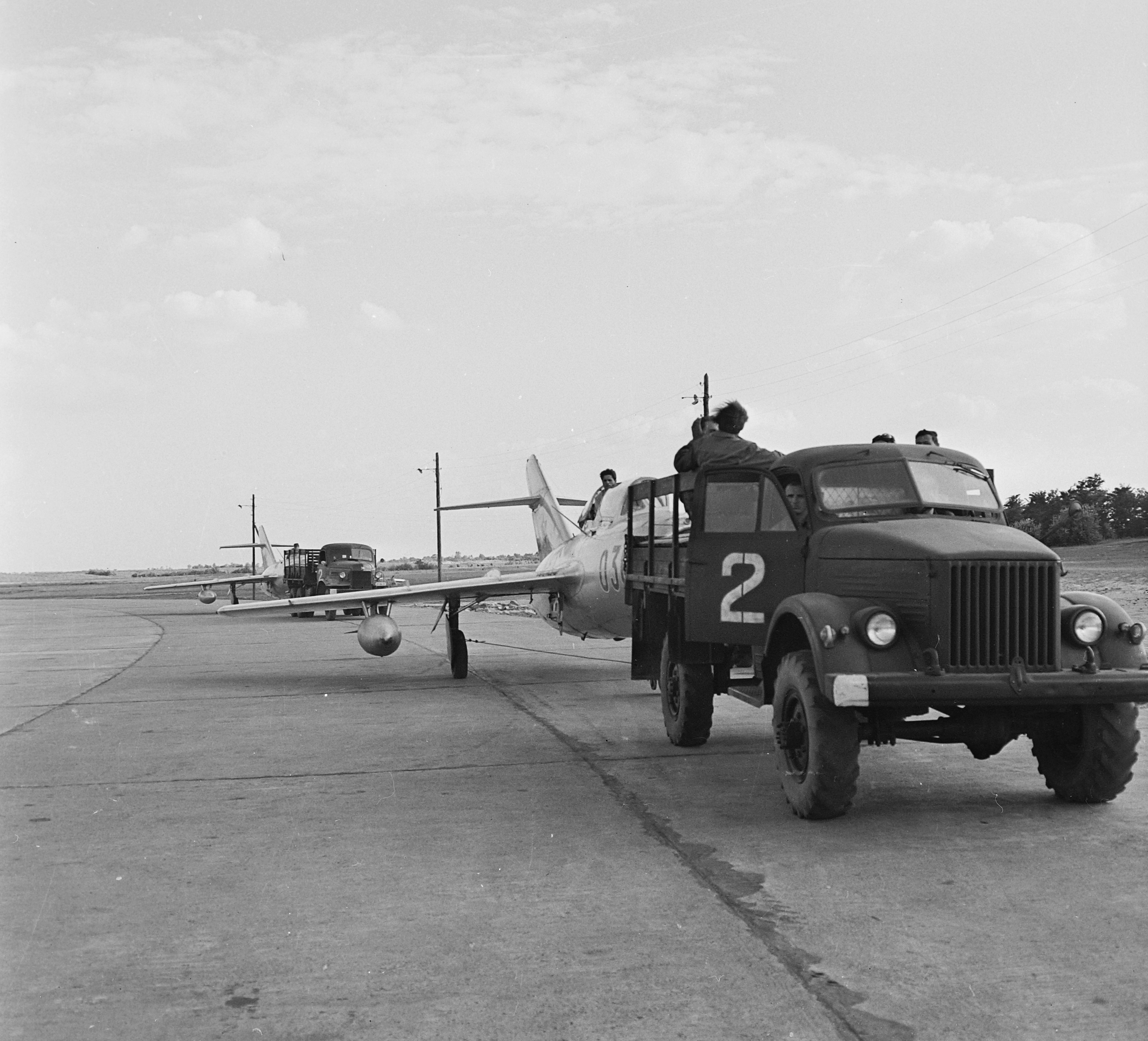
Mig-15 fighter jets at Szolnok in the 1960s

During the Socialist era, Szolnok began to recover with Soviet aid. Factories were built, and touristic importance grew when a thermal bath was opened.

Szolnok was granted the rank of city with county rights on November 13, 1990.

== Demographics ==
In 2001, the population of Szolnok consisted of 98% Hungarian, 1% Gypsy, and 1% people of other nationalities (mainly German).

Szolnok's population reached its highest level in 1989 with almost 82,000 people. Since then it has been slowly but steadily declining.

Historical population

Year	Pop.	±%
1850	10,617	—
1870	15,847	+49.3%
1879	16,120	+1.7%
1900	24,160	+49.9%
1910	24,417	+1.1%
1920	31,065	+27.2%

Year	Pop.	±%
1930	37,317	+20.1%
1941	39,897	+6.9%
1949	34,003	−14.8%
1960	45,640	+34.2%
1970	63,467	+39.1%
1980	75,362	+18.7%

Year	Pop.	±%
1990	78,328	+3.9%
2001	77,654	−0.9%
2011	72,953	−6.1%
2022	66,140	−9.3%

Significant minority groups
Nationality	Population (2011)
Germany	156
Romania	108
Russia	81
Poland	55
Ukraine	50

== Main sights ==
- Bath
- Beer Museum and Manufactory - Sörárium
- Museum of Hungarian Aviation
- Damjanich János Museum
- The Synagogue
- Tiszavirág Bridge

== Politics ==
The current mayor of Szolnok is Györfi Mihály.

The local Municipal Assembly, elected at the 2019 local government elections, is made up of 18 members (1 Mayor, 12 Individual constituencies MEPs and 5 Compensation List MEPs) divided into this political parties and alliances:

Party	Seats	Current Municipal Assembly
Opposition coalition (Note: Coalition of Momentum-Jobbik-MSZP-DK-LMP-Mindenki Magyarországa.)	10	
Fidesz-KDNP	8	M

=== List of mayors ===
List of City Mayors from 1990:

Member	Party	Term of office
László Kőnig	SZDSZ	1990–1991
Attila Várhegyi	Fidesz	1991–1998
Ferenc Szalay	Fidesz-MDF	1998–2002
Lajosné Botka	MSZP	2002–2006
Ferenc Szalay	Fidesz-KDNP	2006–

== Sport ==
- Szolnoki MÁV FC, football team
- Szolnoki Légierő SK, defunct football team
- Szolnoki Olaj KK, basketball team
- Szolnoki Vízilabda SC, waterpolo team

== Festivals ==
- Goulash Festival
- Tiszavirág Festival

== Notable people ==
=== Born in Szolnok ===
- Ferenc Anisits (born 1938), engineer, founder of BMW Diesel Development Center
- Rev Peter Bedekovics (born 1989), Reformed minister, national chair of the Hungarian Scout Association
- Csaba Horváth (1930–2004), chemical engineer and inventor of HPLC
- Gábor Iványi (born 1951), Hungarian pastor and human rights activist
- Zoltán Jeney (1943–2019), composer
- Gina Kanizsa (born 1988), jazz singer
- Hedvig Karakas (born 1990), Olympic Judoka
- Katalin Karikó (born 1955), Nobel laureate of biochemistry, senior vice president of BioNTech .
- Ferenc Molnár (born 1982), Hungarian singer
- Barbara Neumann (1914-2002), mineralogist and clay scientist
- Arpád Račko (1930–2015), Slovak sculptor
- Gábor Szabó, architect
- Gizella Tary (1884–1960), Olympic fencer
- Ferenc Újházy (1827-1921), painter
- Gábor Zombori (born 2002), swimmer

=== Lived in Szolnok ===
- Bertalan Farkas (born 1949), cosmonaut
- Martin Nedić (1810–1895) Croatian poet
- Viktor Orbán (born 1963), prime minister
- Gábor Szegő (1895–1985), mathematician

== International relations ==
Twin towns of Szolnok in Europe

A public transport stop in the Estonian city of Tallinn is named for Szolnok.

=== Twin towns – sister cities ===
Szolnok is twinned with:

- Baia Mare, Romania (1990)
- Bengbu, China
- Bielsko-Biała, Poland (1995)
- Eastwood, England, UK (2006)
- Forlì, Italy (1998)
- Jinzhong, China
- Rakvere, Estonia (2008)
- Reutlingen, Germany (1990)
- Riihimäki, Finland (1969)
- Sanmenxia, China (2008)
- Shoham, Israel (2001)
- Yuza, Japan (2004)

== Gallery ==
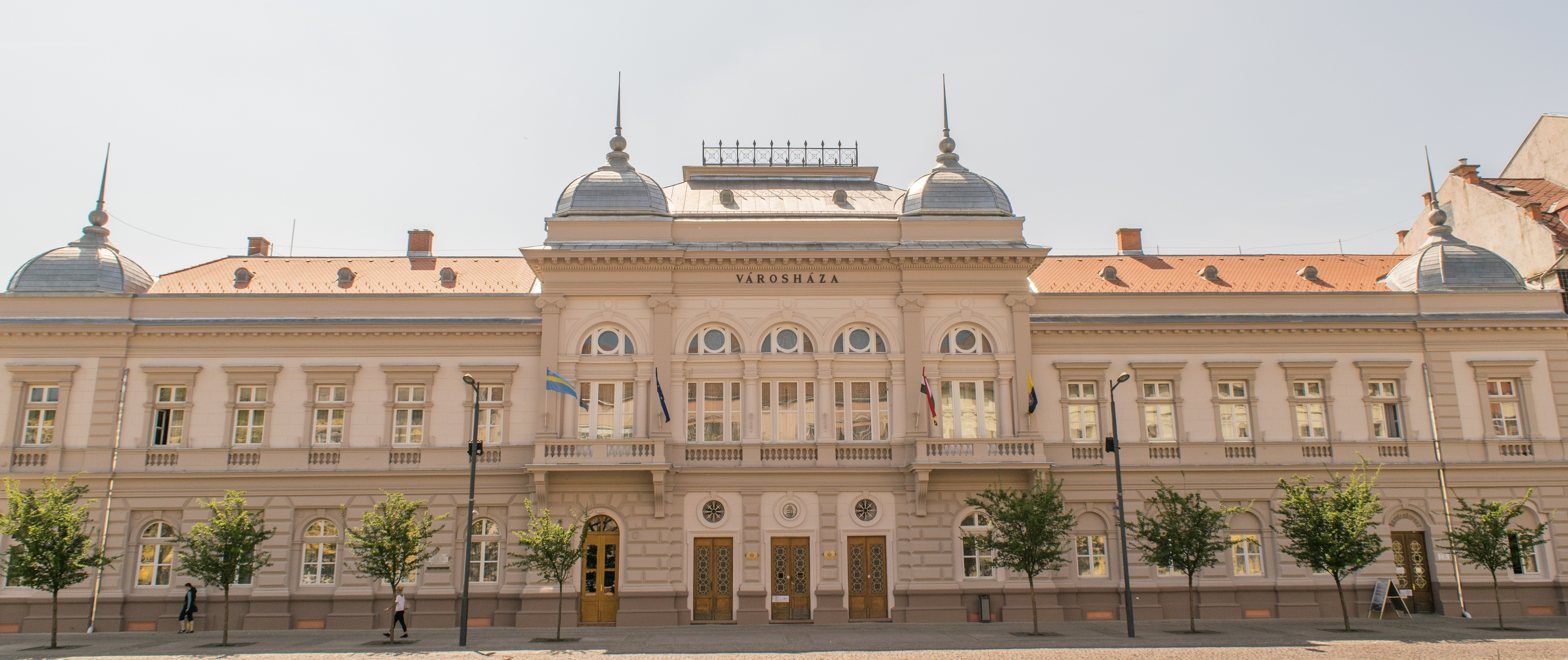
Town hall

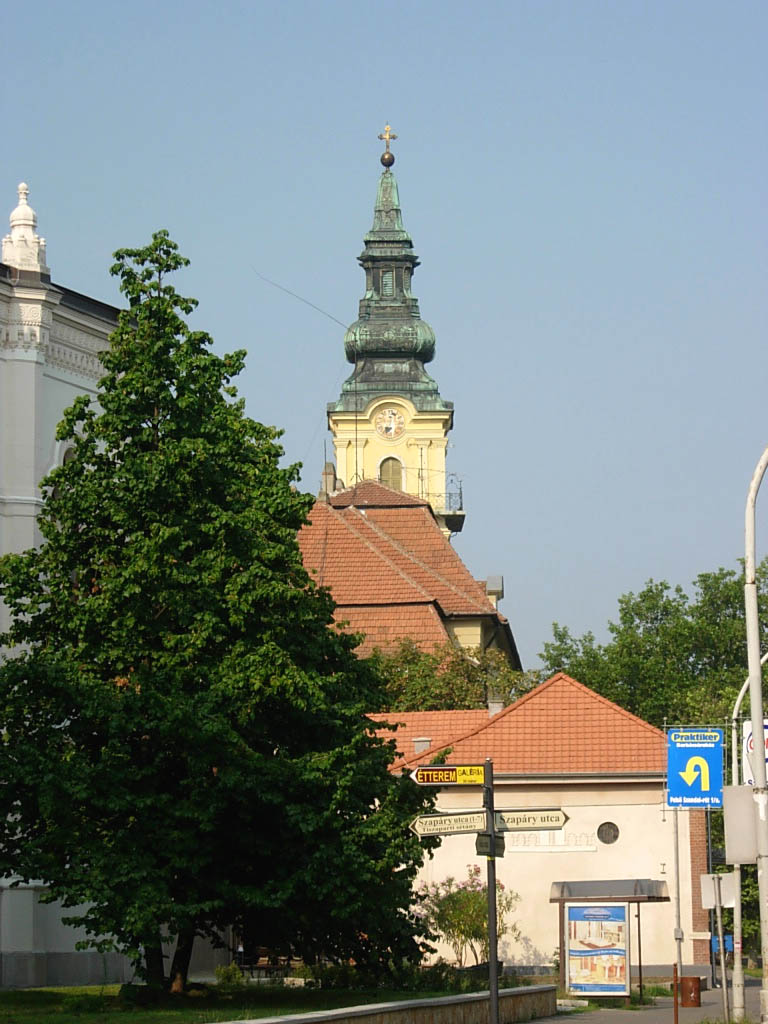
The Catholic church

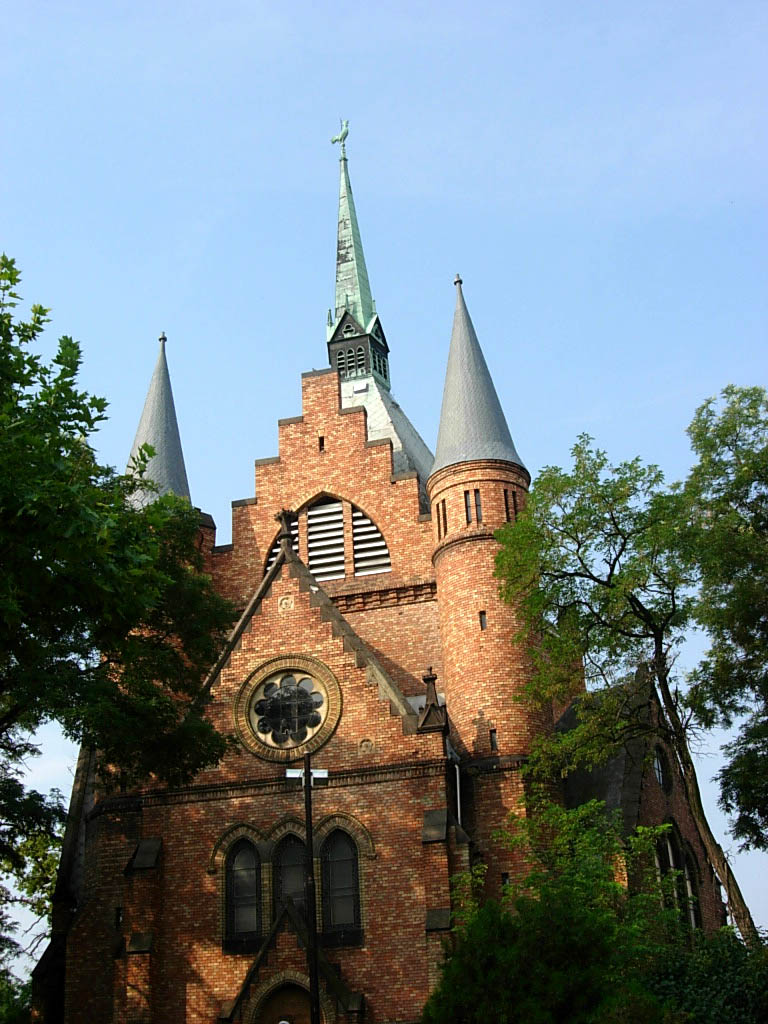
The Calvinist church

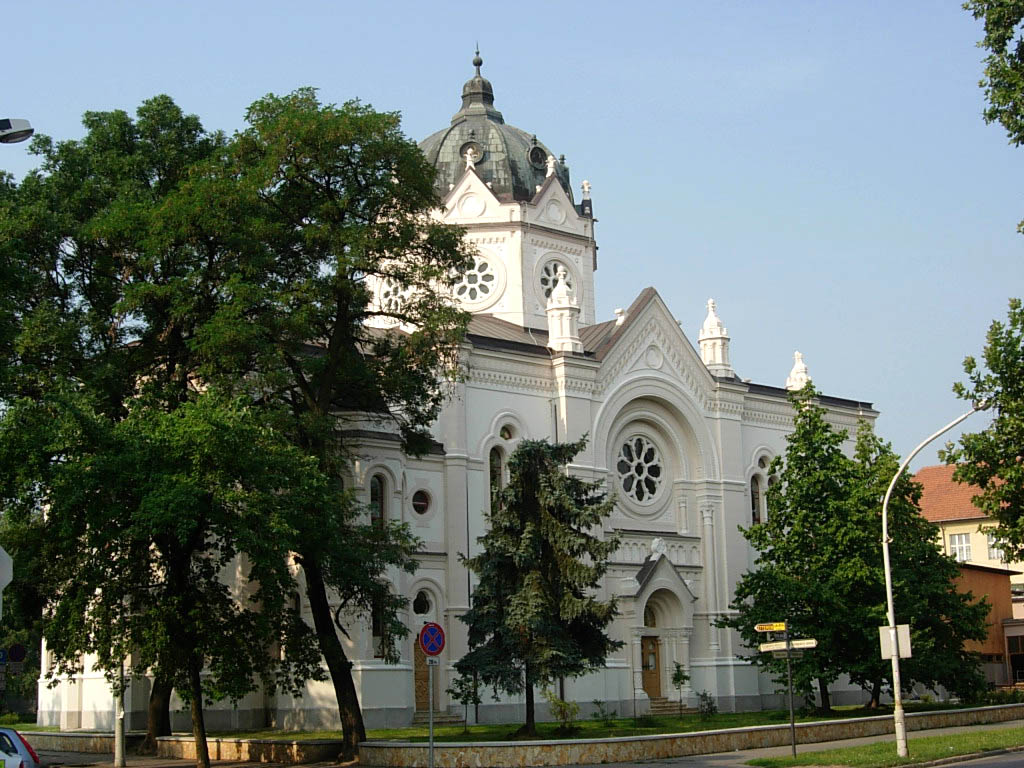
The former synagogue - today the Gallery of Szolnok

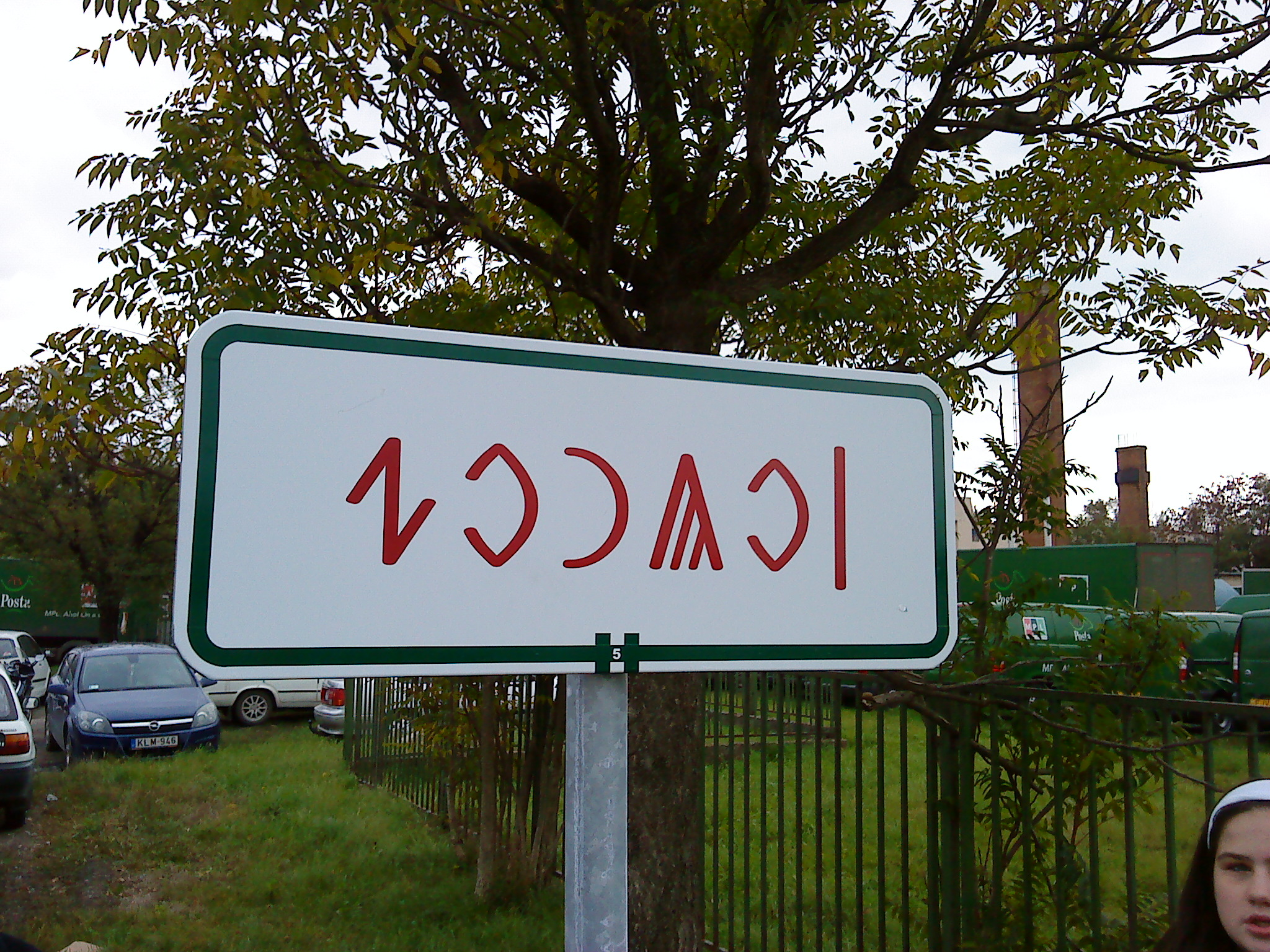
Szolnok city limit sign written in the Rovas script (erected in 2010)
