= Tiszatenyő =

- Village
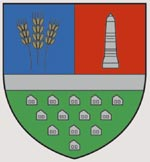
- Coat of arms

- Location within Hungary
- Coordinates: 47°08′N 20°23′E
- Country: Hungary
- County: Jász-Nagykun-Szolnok
- District: Törökszentmiklós

Area
  - Total: 23.55 km^{2} (9.09 sq mi)

Population (2015)
  - Total: 1,649
  - Density: 79/km^{2} (200/sq mi)
- Time zone: UTC+1 (CET)
  - Summer (DST): UTC+2 (CEST)
- Postal code: 5082
- Area code(s): (+36) 56

Tiszatenyő is a village in Jász-Nagykun-Szolnok county, in the Northern Great Plain region of central Hungary.

== Geography ==
It covers an area of 23.55 km^{2} (9 sq mi) and has a population of 1649 people (2015). It's about 16 km (10 mi) far from Szolnok. It has a railway station in the 120 (Budapest East Railway Station-Szolnok-Békéscsaba-Arad) and the 130 (Szolnok-Tiszatenyő-Szentes-Makó) rail line. It has also a bus stop on the Törökszentmiklós-Martfű road.
