= Vata (noble) =

Hungarian noble, leader of the Vata pagan uprising

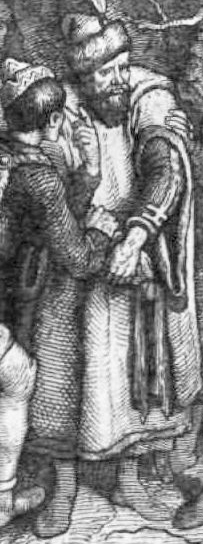
- Drawing of Vata in the Vasárnapi Ujság newspaper (19th century)
- Born: 11th century
- Died: 11th century
- Noble family: Csolt
- Issue: John

Vata or Vatha (fl. 1046) was a Hungarian noble, lord of the castle of Békés and chief of a tribe in Körösvidék (today Crișana). He is known for being the leader of the Vata pagan uprising.

== Life ==
Alternative theories suggest that he was of Pecheneg origin. To preserve his position, he formally adopted Christianity at the start of his reign, although Peter Orseolo attempted to remove him from power because of his well-known pagan lifestyle.

...Vata was the name of who first offered himself to the devil, shaved off his head, and left three pigtails according to the pagan custom...

— Mark of Kalt: Chronicon Pictum

=== Uprising ===
In 1046, the nobility called back Vazul's sons from the Kievan Rus' for a rebellion against Peter Orseolo, who swore to "fill this land with foreigners and give it to the Germans" according to the Illuminated Chronicle. Using this opportunity, Vata started another uprising in Eastern Hungary with the purpose of Dechristianizing the kingdom. At Abaújvár, his mob met with the newly arrived brothers and demanded them to "let the whole people live according to pagan customs, let them kill the bishops and the churchmen, ruin the churches, drop the Christian faith and respect idols". Having no other choice, they had to accept it. During the chaos, Gerard of Csanád, enemy of Peter was thought to be a clergyman of him and was executed. The king tried to escape into Austria, but was blinded possibly by Vata's followers. The younger brother, Andrew was crowned king and defeated the pagan rebels who supported the older brother Levente, who didn't convert to Christianity.

=== Later life ===
Vata retained his position afterwards by submitting to Andrew and serving him until death. His only known child is John, who later led another pagan uprising in 1061.

== Sources ==
- Szegfű, László (1980). "Vata népe [The People of Vata]". Acta Universitatis Szegediensis de Attila József nominatae. Acta Historica (in Hungarian). 67. MTA-SZTE-MOL Magyar Medievisztikai Kutatócsoport: 11–19. ISSN 0324-6965.
- Uhrman, Iván (2010). "Az utolsó törzsfő vagy az első parasztvezér? Az úgynevezett Vata-felkelés [The Last Chieftain or the First Peasant Leader? The so-called Vata Uprising]". Hadtörténelmi Közlemények (in Hungarian). 123 (1–2). Hadtörténeti Intézet és Múzeum: 44–112. ISSN 0017-6540.
