= Fejér County (former) =

County of the Kingdom of Hungary

Fejér County Comitatus Albensis (Latin) Fejér vármegye (Hungarian) Komitat Weißenburg (German)
- County of the Kingdom of Hungary (11th century-1543, 1692-1946)
- Coat of arms

- Capital: Székesfehérvár
- Area
  - Coordinates: 47°11′N 18°25′E
  - 1910: 4,129 km^{2} (1,594 sq mi)
- Population
  - 1910: 250,600
- History
  - Established: 11th century
  - Ottoman conquest: 1543
  - County recreated: 1692
  - Monarchy abolished: 1 February 1946
- Today part of: Hungary

Fejér (in Latin: comitatus Albensis) was an administrative county (comitatus) of the Kingdom of Hungary. Its territory, which was slightly smaller than that of present Fejér county, today in central Hungary. The capital of the county was Székesfehérvár.

== Geography ==
Fejér county shared borders with the Hungarian counties Veszprém, Komárom, Pest-Pilis-Solt-Kiskun and Tolna. It lay southwest of Budapest, around Székesfehérvár. The river Danube formed most of its eastern border. Its area was 4129 km^{2} around 1910.

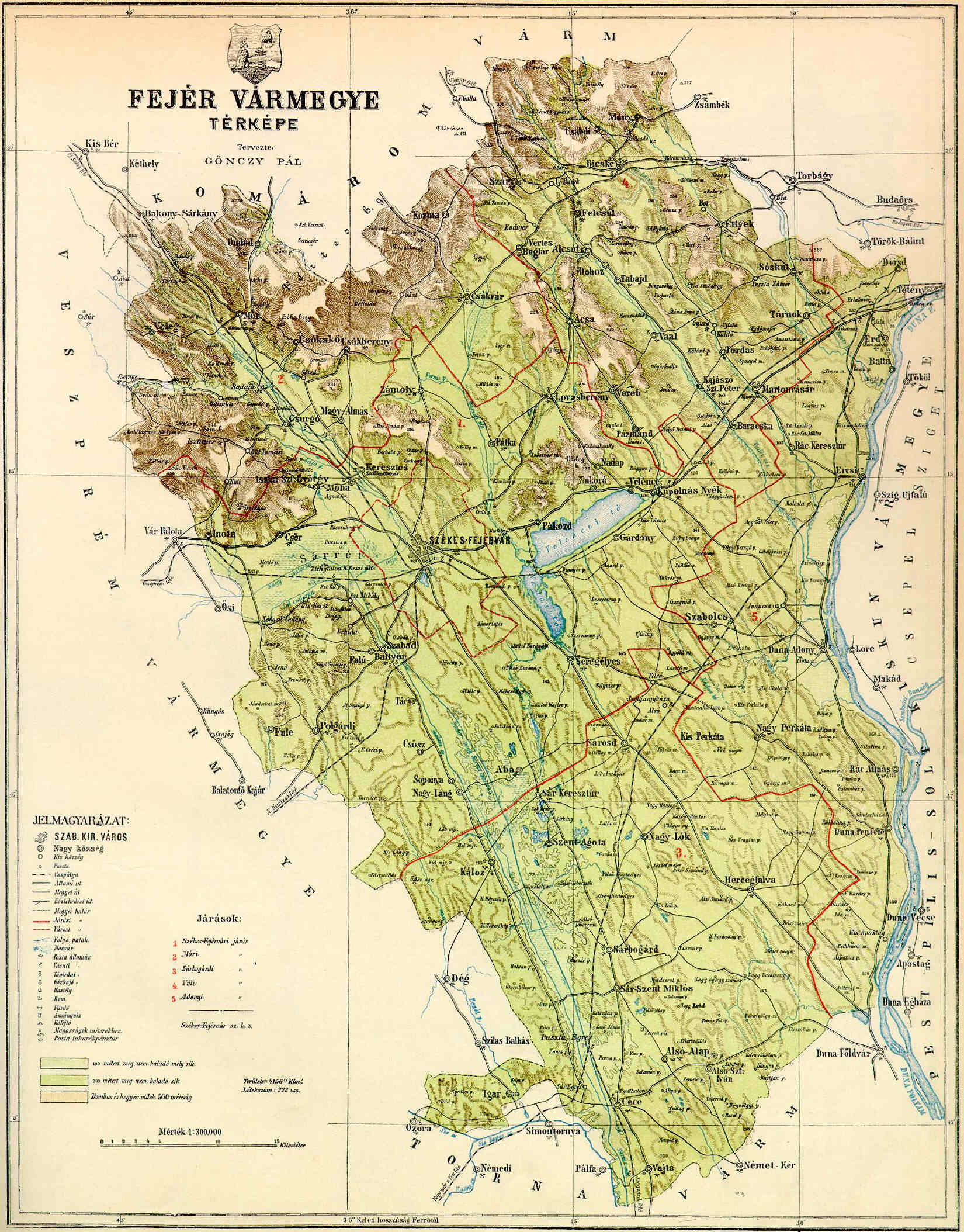
Map of the former Fejér county (Kingdom of Hungary) around 1910

== History ==
Fejér county arose as one of the first comitatus of the Kingdom of Hungary, in the 11th century. Székesfehérvár, as a seat for the coronation of the Hungarian monarch and location of royal burials, held a central role in the Middle Ages. The Solt region, east of the Danube river, which used to be part of Fejér county, went to Pest-Pilis-Solt county in 1569.

In 1945, the city of Érd and its surroundings went to Pest county, while in 1950 the region south-east of Lake Balaton (around Enying), which used to be in Veszprém county went to Fejér county.

== Demographics ==
=== 1891 ===
Ethnic groups (1891):

- Hungarians (Magyars): 190,660 (85.7%)
- Germans: 26,077 (11.7%)
- Slovaks: 2924 (1.3%)
- Serbs: 2103 (0.9%)

Total population: 222,445

=== 1900 ===
In 1900, the county had a population of 236,102 people and was composed of the following linguistic communities:

Total:

- Hungarian: 202,890 (85.9%)
- German: 25,713 (10.9%)
- Slovak: 4,180 (1.8%)
- Serbian: 965 (0.4%)
- Croatian: 441 (0.2%)
- Romanian: 116 (0.0%)
- Ruthenian: 10 (0.0%)
- Other or unknown: 1,787 (0.8%)

According to the census of 1900, the county was composed of the following religious communities:

Total:

- Roman Catholic: 161,474 (68.4%)
- Calvinist: 58,616 (24.8%)
- Jewish: 7,863 (3.3%)
- Lutheran: 6,741 (2.9%)
- Greek Orthodox: 1,017 (0.4%)
- Unitarian: 254 (0.1%)
- Greek Catholic: 117 (0.0%)
- Other or unknown: 20 (0.0%)

=== 1910 ===
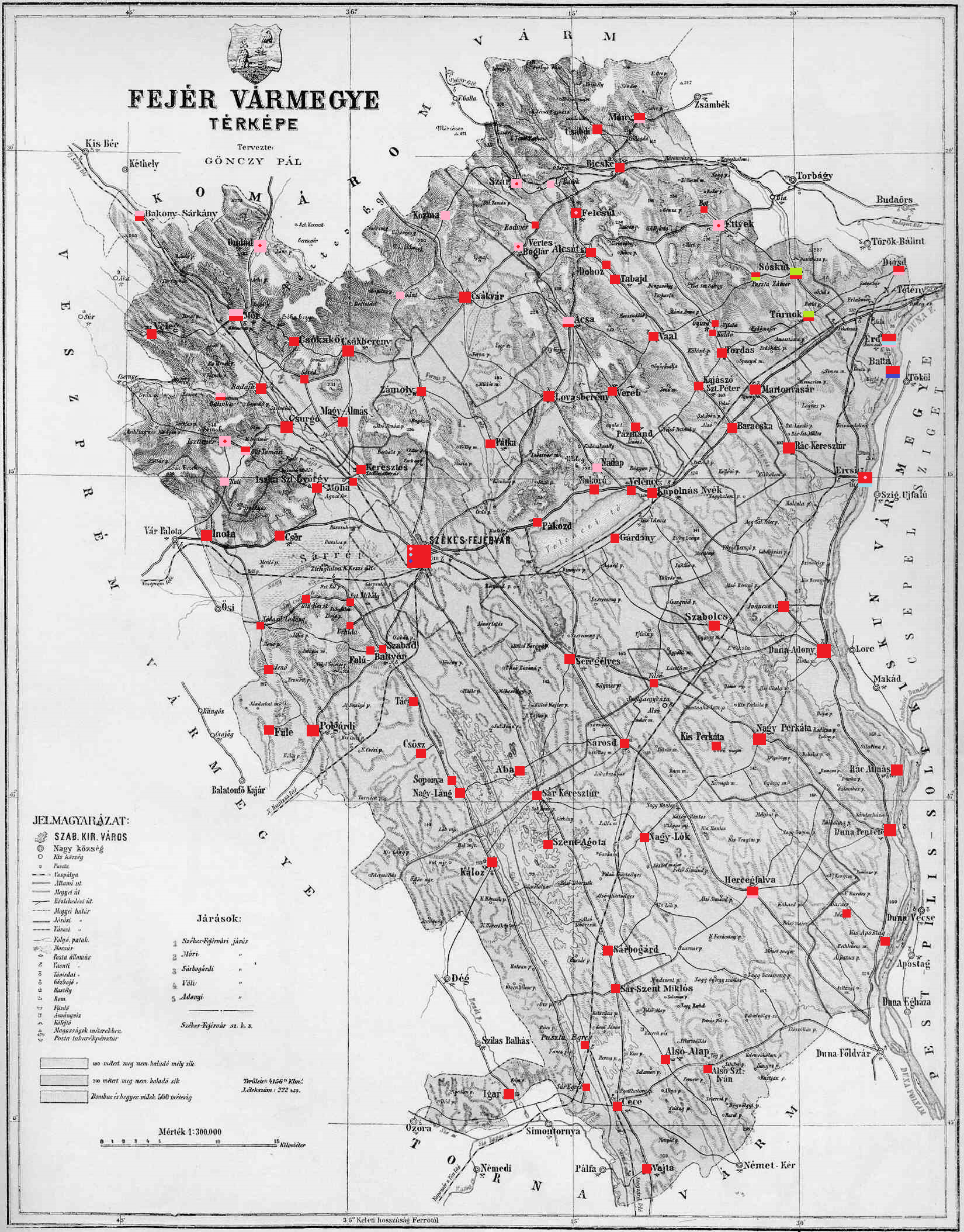
Ethnic map of Fejér county according to the data of the 1910 census. Key: red - Hungarians; pink - Germans; light green - Slovaks; light blue - Croatians; dark blue - Serbs. Coloured dots in a plain rectangle imply the presence of smaller minority populations (generally more than 100 people or 10%). Multicoloured rectangles imply cities and villages with multi-ethnic populations with the order of the stripes following the ethnic composition of the settlement.

In 1910, the county had a population of 250,670 people and was composed of the following linguistic communities:

Total:

- Hungarian: 218,822 (87.3%)
- German: 24,265 (9.7%)
- Slovak: 4,359 (1.7%)
- Serbian: 814 (0.3%)
- Croatian: 333 (0.1%)
- Romanian: 37 (0.0%)
- Ruthenian: 5 (0.0%)
- Other or unknown: 2,035 (0.8%)

According to the census of 1910, the county was composed of the following religious communities:

Total:

- Roman Catholic: 175,464 (70.0%)
- Calvinist: 59,105 (23.6%)
- Jewish: 7,382 (3.0%)
- Lutheran: 7,267 (2.9%)
- Greek Orthodox: 1,060 (0.4%)
- Unitarian: 202 (0.0%)
- Greek Catholic: 161 (0.0%)
- Other or unknown: 29 (0.0%)

== Subdivisions ==
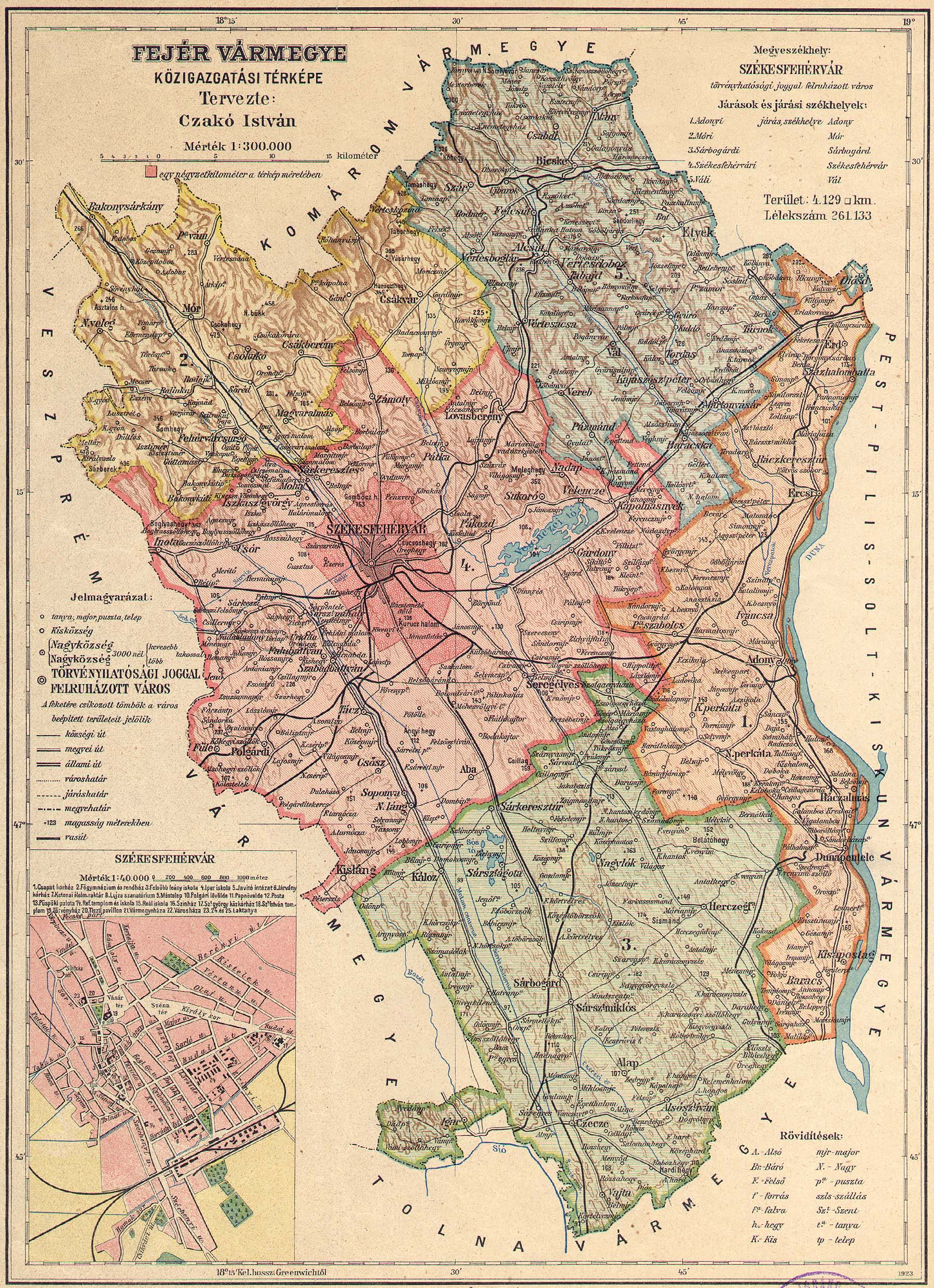

In the early 20th century, the subdivisions of Fejér county were:

Districts (járás)
District	Capital
Adony	Adony
Mór	Mór
Sárbogárd	Sárbogárd
Székesfehérvár	Székesfehérvár
Vál	Vál
Urban counties (törvényhatósági jogú város)
Székesfehérvár
