= Szolnok Castle =

Coordinates: 47°10′25.50″N 20°12′15.33″E

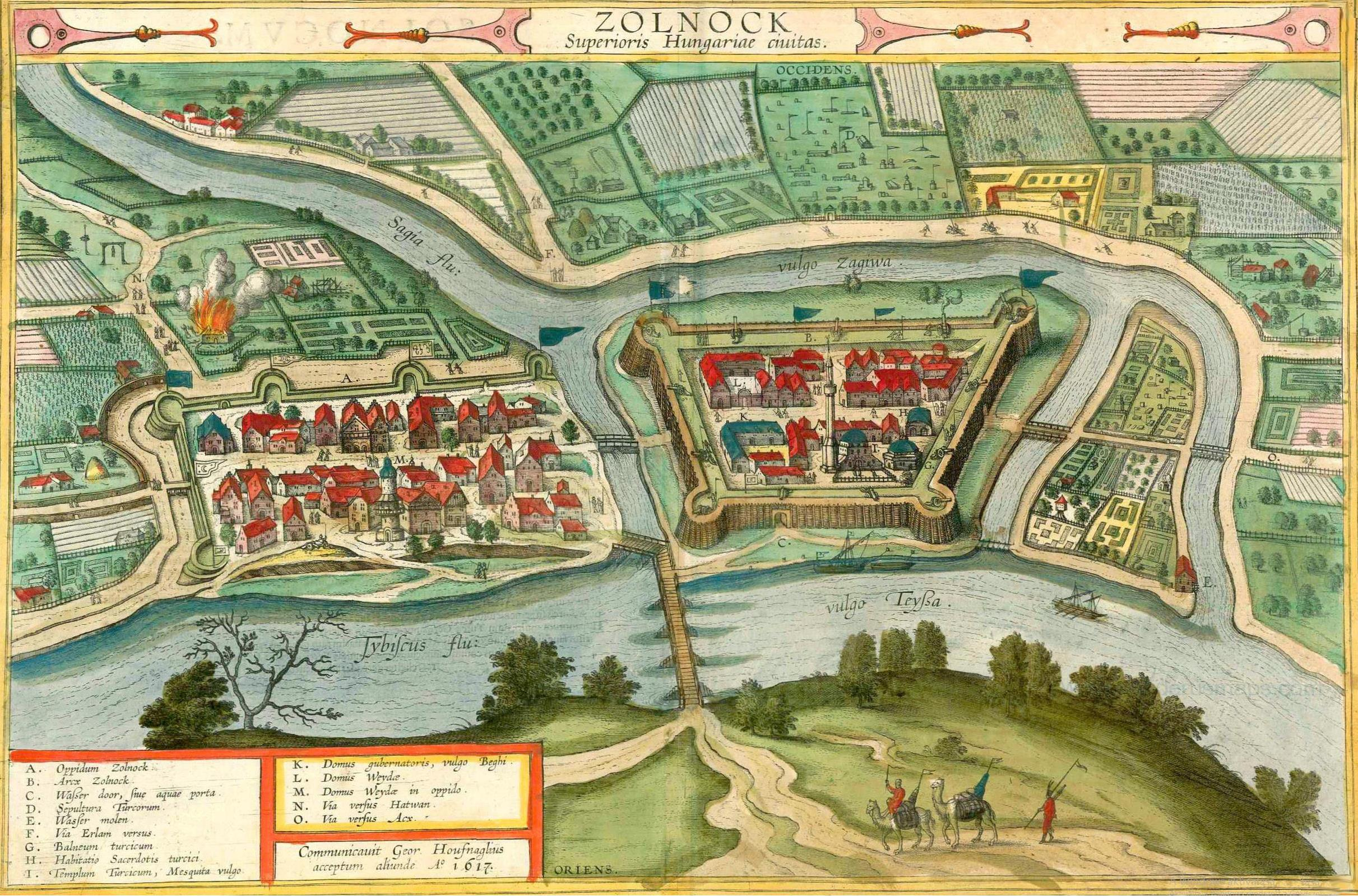
Szolnok Castle

Szolnok Castle was an important military fort for many centuries due to its prime location at the confluence of the Tisza and Zagyva rivers, in the middle of the Great Hungarian Plain. The area was the crossroads of several trade routes, including salt and lumber, as well as being a key route for armies passing between Buda and Transylvania. Against the advancing Ottoman forces in the 16th century, Szolnok and Eger were the only two forts protecting the heart of Hungary and Upper Hungary.

Beginning in the time of the Árpád dynasty (9th to 13th centuries) there was an earthwork fort at Szolnok. After the 1526 Battle of Mohács this was expanded to a Pfostenschlitzmauer, and later a stone fortress in the face of Szolnok's key position against the Ottomans. In the 17th century the fort continued to be expanded and improved, but after the Rákóczi Uprising the fort fell into disuse. It was dismantled and the stones were used in several buildings in Szolnok. Today only traces of the fort remain.

== Construction of the castle ==
The decision to upgrade the palisade fort to one of stone was based on Szolnok's geographical importance, and its place in the border castle system. After the Ottoman armies captured Temesvár and occupied the Danube-Tisza-Mureş area, only two forces of any significance stood between them and the rest of Hungary: Szolnok, and Eger to the north. Beginning in June 1552, Hungarian, Transylvanian, and Viennese agents all began reporting that the Ottoman army was on the move out of Temesvár towards Szolnok and Eger. The task of capturing the two was given to Ali Pasha of Buda. After the fall of other minor fortifications on the Puszta, Sultan Suleiman the Magnificent ordered Pashas Ahmed, Ali, and Mohamed to lead their armies against the castles.

It was in light of this Turkish danger that in 1550-51 Ferdinand I ordered the Szolnok earthworks to be improved with a new town wall (partially planned by István Dobó), the castle to be fortified, and Lőrinc Nyáry put in command. General Nicolaus Salm planned the works and supervised the workforce, which was made up mostly of local peasants and some soldiers under orders. Although they were using some stone, for the most part the walls were built up as clay packed between upright beams. In the etchings a typical four-sided fort with a spacious inner courtyard can be seen, protected by rounded cannon towers at each corner and a wide surrounding moat. The final completion of the bastions was possible only after the Turks left, many years later.

Further works began in summer of 1552 and progressed rapidly. In order to surround the castle, a new branch of the Zagyva river was dug. This new branch is the one that remains today, at the point where the Zagyva flows into the Tisza river. The original course of the Zagyva has today been filled in, but a small part of it remains as the lake in front of the Szolnok MÁV Hospital.

== Ottoman siege of 1552 ==
Under the command of Lőrinc Nyáry the fort contained 1400 soldiers, mostly Spanish, German, Czech, with a small number of Hungarians. The castle was armed with 24 cannons, 3000 muskets, 800 weights of gunpowder, and was well-stocked with food and supplies.

On September 2, 1552, Pasha Ahmed Ali besieged the castle with his army of 40,000. Although it was the German mercenaries who first entertained thoughts of escape, it was the Hungarian boatmen who deserted first. On the night of September 3rd the Hungarian and Spanish horsemen swam across the Tisza, then the boatmen returned for the foot soldiers. On the night of September 4th the mercenaries deserted, leaving the castle to its fate. After they departed the front gate was left open until morning, leading to the easy overpowering and capture of Lőrinc Nyáry and the fifty remaining brave men.

István Mekcsey, one of the defenders of the Siege of Eger, wrote the following to his sister four days before the Turkish advance forces reached Eger: "I can't write more... but to say that every day now we feel we are awaiting a great punishment since the traitors gave up Szolnok."

Ahmed and Mohamed left a garrison of 2000 soldiers in Szolnok while they marched against Eger. The castle remained in Turkish hands until 1685.

== Ottoman age ==
The Ottoman occupation of Szolnok lasted from 1552 to 1685. In 1553 they established the sanjak of Szolnok, and in the following years built a mosque, baths, and a minaret; during the course of later battles these were destroyed, mostly deliberately. Of the minaret the base remained, and this was made into a stylized fountain which remains today. In 1562 they constructed the first permanent bridge spanning the Tisza. The remains of the so-called Szolnok Turkish Bridge (Hungarian: szolnoki török kori híd) again came to light in August 2003 after a summer of drought. The only Turkish codex made in Hungary was copied in Szolnok; it describes the campaigns of Suleiman in Hungary. Pottery and tools from the Turkish era can be seen today in Szolnok's Damjanich János Museum.

== After the Ottoman occupation ==
In 1685 Szolnok was liberated from the Ottomans by the Habsburg armies under the control of Generals Sigbert Heister and Mercz; during the liberation both the city and the castle were significantly damaged. Due to the castle's strategic importance it was rebuilt by commander Antonio Caraffa. At this time the remaining wooden parts of the castle were finished with stone, and other changes were made to the facade. In a survey sketch from the Vienna War Archives (Kriegsarchiv des Österreichischen Staatsarchivs), it can be seen that by 1778 the once-rounded towers had been replaced with polygonal towers.

It is also worth noting that by this time the Szolnok Turkish Bridge was destroyed, so a new bridge was made across the Tisza, but connecting the two banks at the town itself, which meant the other side of the Zagyva, which in essence was the model for construction of all later bridges. At this time the walls around the city, the wooden-spined towers and most of the city wall was destroyed, and the city's former moat filled in. The former moat is remembered today in the "Tófenék utca" ("Bottom-of-the-Lake Street") street name, which can be found in the center of Szolnok, where the northwest part of the moat used to lie.

In 1697 Imre Thököly burned down the castle. The events of the Rákóczi Uprising in 1703, and 1706 reached Szolnok and the city was again razed to the ground. In 1706 Ferenc Deák, one of Rákóczi's leaders, burned the castle so that Imperial forces couldn't use it, so Imperial General Rabutin had the stones all taken away. In 1710 forces loyal to Rákóczi took over the castle, but on October 10 they abandoned it to the advancing army of Imperial General Jacob Joseph Cusani. After the Uprising, the castle finally fell to pieces and the stones were carted away.

The planned demolition of the castle took place between 1799 and 1811.

== Related pages ==
- Szolnok
- Siege of Eger
- Ottoman wars in Europe
- Ottoman–Habsburg wars

== Sources ==
Sources in Hungarian:

- Sugár István (1971). Az egri vár és diadala. Budapest: Zrínyi Katonai Könyv- és lapkiadó.
- Kardos Tamás; Varga Ferenc (1990). Szolnoki séták (in Hungarian, English, German, and Russian). Szolnok.
