= Vata pagan uprising =

Hungarian rebellion in 1046

- Part of Christianization of Hungary
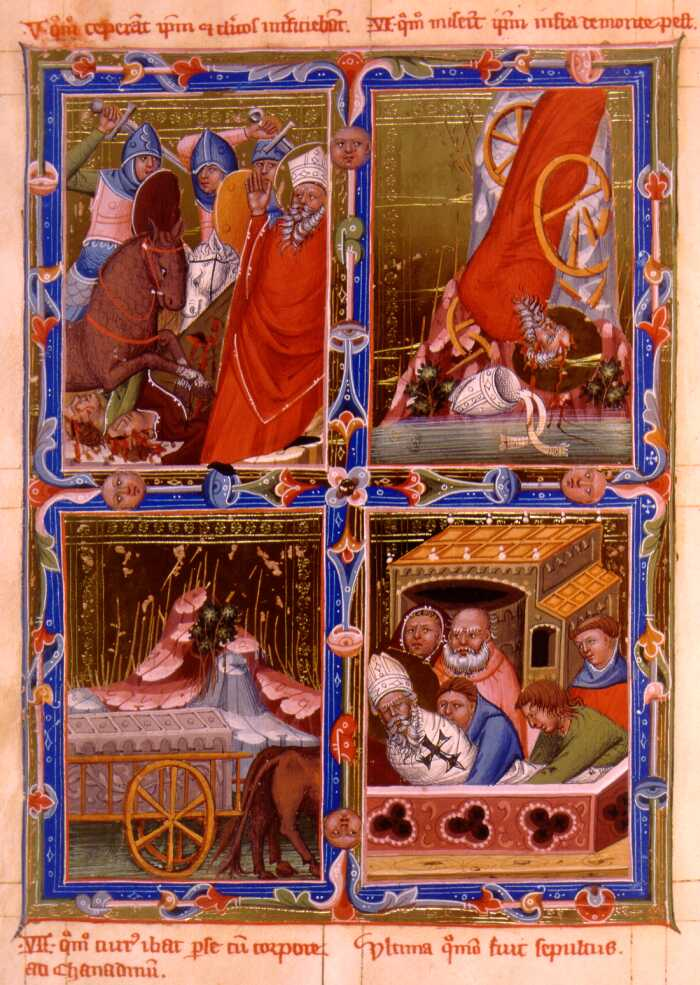
- Pagans slaughtering priests and the martyrdom of Bishop Gerard of Csanád depicted in the Anjou Legendarium
Date	1046
Location	Kingdom of Hungary
Result	Christian victory

Belligerents
Hungarian rebels	Árpád dynasty

Commanders and leaders
Vata	Peter Urseolo; Andrew I

Strength
Unknown	Unknown

Casualties and losses
Unknown	Heavy

The Vata pagan uprising (Hungarian: Vata-féle lázadás) was a Hungarian rebellion which, in 1046, brought about the overthrow of King Peter Urseolo, the martyrdom of Bishop Gerard of Csanád (Hungarian: Gellért) and the reinstatement of the Árpád dynasty on the Hungarian throne.

== Background ==
Christianity had been introduced in Hungary by King Stephen I of Hungary. Upon his death in 1038, he was succeeded by his sororal nephew Peter Urseolo, a Venetian noble. Through tax increases, and Urseolo's involvement with foreign powers, he proved to be an unpopular ruler. The Hungarian peasants, still largely pagan, suspected he was intent on bringing Hungary into the fold of the Holy Roman Empire. In a rebellion in 1041, Stephen's brother-in-law Samuel Aba took control of the throne, overthrowing Urseolo. Urseolo fled to Bavaria, in exile allying himself with German king and Holy Roman Emperor Henry III.

In the years that followed, Aba's reign weakened, likely due to opposition from the church, who disliked his catering to pagan beliefs. With support from Henry, Peter Urseolo returned to Hungary in 1044, defeating Aba at the Battle of Ménfő. Urseolo regained the throne, but Hungary became a vassal of the Holy Roman Empire, though it was not to remain so for long. However, his second reign would prove to be even more short-lived than his first.

== Rebellion and Vata's mob ==
Andrew (András in Hungarian), Béla and Levente were the sons of Vazul, cousin of Saint Stephen. During the reign of Samuel Aba, they had fled the country in fear of their lives, Béla to Poland and András and Levente to Kiev. In 1046, András and Levente returned to Újvár (today: Abaújvár) in Hungary from their exile and quickly gained popular support for the throne, especially among the pagan populace, despite the fact that András was Christian (Levente had remained pagan). On their return, a rebellion began, which András and Levente initially supported.

The pagan Vata (or Vatha), lord of the castle of Békés and leader of a Hungarian tribe in Körösvidék was a longstanding enemy of the king. He adopted Christianity to preserve his positions, but continued to practice paganism.

...Vata was the name of who first offered himself to the devil, shaved off his head, and left three pigtails according to the pagan custom...

— Márk Kálti: Illuminated Chronicle

When the opportunity came, he started the uprising of the masses which quickly spread to all of Eastern Hungary. He had the intention of destroying Christianity in Hungary.

...let the whole people live according to pagan customs, let them kill the bishops and the churchmen, ruin the churches, drop the Christian faith and respect idols.

— Márk Kálti: Illuminated Chronicle

King Peter is said to have fled towards Székesfehérvár, where he was killed by the rebellious townspeople, and András, as the oldest brother, pronounced himself king. As András and Levente's men moved towards Pest, the bishops Gerard, Besztrik, Buldi and Beneta gathered to greet them.

In Pest, on September 24, the bishops were attacked by Vata's mob, who began stoning the bishops. Buldi was stoned to death. As the pagans threw rocks at him, Gellért repeatedly made the sign of the cross, which further infuriated the pagans. Gellért was taken up Kelenhegy hill, where he was put into a cart and pushed off a cliff, onto the banks of the Danube. Besztrik and Beneta managed to flee across the river, where Besztrik was injured by pagans before they could be rescued by András and Levente. Only Beneta survived.

Gellért was later canonized for his martyrdom and the hill from which he had been thrown was renamed Gellért Hill. Now in central Budapest, the hill has a monument on the cliff where Gellért, now a patron saint of Hungary, was killed.

== Aftermath ==
The Vatha uprising marked the last major attempt at stopping Christian rule in Hungary. While Andrew had received assistance from pagans in his rise to the throne, he had no plans to abolish Christianity in the kingdom. Once in power he distanced himself from Vatha and the pagans. However, they were not punished for their actions.

== Sources ==
- Kristó, Gyula (1965). Karácsonyi, Béla (ed.). "Megjegyzések az ún. "pogánylázadások" kora történetéhez [Comments on the History of the so-called Age of "Pagan Rebellions"]". Acta Universitatis Szegediensis de Attila József nominatae. Acta Historica (in Hungarian). 18. MTA-SZTE-MOL Magyar Medievisztikai Kutatócsoport: 1–59. ISSN 0324-6965.
- Szegfű, László (1980). "Vata népe [The People of Vata]". Acta Universitatis Szegediensis de Attila József nominatae. Acta Historica (in Hungarian). 67. MTA-SZTE-MOL Magyar Medievisztikai Kutatócsoport: 11–19. ISSN 0324-6965.
- Uhrman, Iván (2010). "Az utolsó törzsfő vagy az első parasztvezér? Az úgynevezett Vata-felkelés [The Last Chieftain or the First Peasant Leader? The so-called Vata Uprising]". Hadtörténelmi Közlemények (in Hungarian). 123 (1–2). Hadtörténeti Intézet és Múzeum: 44–112. ISSN 0017-6540.
