= List of wars involving Hungary =

This is a list of wars in which the Hungarian armed forces participated or that took place on the historical territory of Hungary.

For more comprehensive information on military conflicts, see:

- List of military conflicts involving Hungary (800–1300)
- List of military conflicts involving Hungary (1301–1526)
- List of military conflicts involving Hungary (1527–1700)
- List of military conflicts involving Hungary (1701–1900)
- List of military conflicts involving Hungary (1901–2000)
- List of military conflicts involving Hungary (2001–)

The list includes the name, date, Hungarian allies and enemies, and the result of each conflict, using the following legend:

Victory
Defeat
Result of civil or internal conflict
Treaty or peace without a clear result, status quo ante bellum, an unknown or indecisive result
Ongoing conflict

== Middle Ages ==
=== Wars under the Árpád dynasty's rule ===
Date	Conflict	Allies	Enemies	Result
811	Byzantine–Bulgarian war: Battle of Pliska; The Battle of Pliska (Manasses Chronicle, 12th century)	First Bulgarian Empire; Hungarian Tribes; Avar mercenaries	Byzantine Empire	Decisive Bulgarian victory: The Hungarians were in alliance with Krum of Bulgaria against Emperor Nikephoros.
~830	Hungarian – Khazar War	Hungarian Tribes	Khazars	Hungarian victory
862–895	Hungarian conquest of the Carpathian Basin Hungarian conquest of the Carpathian Basin (painting by Mihály Munkácsy, 1893)	Hungarian Tribes	East Francia; Great Moravia; First Bulgarian Empire	Hungarian conquest of the Carpathian Basin: Foundation of Grand Principality of Hungary in the Carpathian Basin.
894–896	Byzantine–Bulgarian war of 894–896	Byzantine Empire; Magyars	Bulgarian Empire; Pechenegs	Bulgarian victory: Bulgaria's status as most favoured nation restored; Eastern Roman Empire pays annual tax tribute to Bulgaria; Bulgaria's status as most dominant Eastern European nation retained; Bulgarian territorial gains in Thrace Magyars forced to migrate westwards and settle in Pannonia
895	Campaign of Kiev The Hungarians at Kiev (painting by Pál Vágó, 1885)	Hungarian Tribes	Kievan Rus'	Hungarian victory
898–900	Hungarian–Venetian War	Hungarian Tribes	Republic of Venice	Venetian victory
899–970	Hungarian invasions of Europe: Battle of Brenta (899) Battle of Pressburg / Pozsony (907); Battle of Eisenach (908) Battle of Lechfeld / Augsburg (910); Battle of Rednitz (910); Battle of Püchen (919); Battle of Drava River (925?); Battle of Merseburg / Riade (933); Battle of W.l.n.d.r (934) Battle of Fraxinet (942); Battle of Lechfeld / Augsburg (955); Battle of Arcadiopolis (970)	Hungarian Tribes	Kingdom of Italy; East Francia; West Francia; Middle Francia; Great Moravia; Byzantine Empire; Al-Andalus; First Bulgarian Empire; Principality of Serbia	More than a century of raids and decisive wars: Between 899 and 970, according to contemporary sources, the researchers count 47 (38 to West and 9 to East) raids in different parts of Europe. From these campaigns only 8 were unsuccessful and the others ended with success.; Many tributes were paid to the Hungarians.; Many times the rulers of Europe hired the Hungarian warriors against each other.; The most significant result of the Battle of Pressburg is that the Hungarians secured their lands in 907, prevented a future German invasion, the Germans did not attack Hungarian land until 1030.; The Hungarians also used a preemptive war against the Germans and the German unification.; A Hungarian army was defeated in German land at the Battle of Lechfeld in 955. Seven years later Otto I was rewarded for stopping the Hungarians and he was crowned Emperor by Pope John XII in 962 and the Holy Roman Empire (962–1806) was established.; The Hungarian military presence stabilized the Hungarian state in the Carpathian Basin.
917	Byzantine–Bulgarian war of 913–927: Battle of Achelous; The Bulgarian victory at Anchelous (13th century)	First Bulgarian Empire; Principality of Hungary; Pechenegs	Byzantine Empire	Bulgarian victory: Hungarian troops are helping Simeon I of Bulgaria to defeat the Byzantines in the great Battle of Acheloos.
960	Battle of Drina (Its existence is questionable)	Principality of Hungary	Principality of Serbia	Serbian victory: Hungarian leader named Kisa was defeated by Časlav, the Prince of Serbia.
960	Battle of Syrmia (Its existence is questionable) Illustration of Časлав being thrown into the Sava by the Hungarians (19th century)	Principality of Hungary	Principality of Serbia	Hungarian victory: A Hungarian army defeated Čаслав, the Prince of Serbia by avenge of the widow of Kisa.
984	Hungarian – German border conflict at Melk Leopold the Illustrious fighting the Hungarians and defending Melk (Babenberger Stammbaum, 1489–1492)	Principality of Hungary	Margraviate of Austria	Hungarian defeat: The Hungarians supported Henry II, Duke of Bavaria against Otto II, Holy Roman Emperor, thus the Hungarians raided several times the territories of Piligrim, Bishop of Passau from the fortress of Melk.; Leopold I, Margrave of Austria launched a counter-attack and besieged and occupied Melk, which forced Géza, Grand Prince of Hungary to withdraw Hungarian forces from the territories west of the Vienna Woods and Khalenberg.; Later, Géza, Grand Prince of Hungary renounced the lands west of the river Leitha in his peace treaty of 996 with Henry IV of Bavaria. The river Leitha became the historic border between the Kingdom of Hungary and the Holy Roman Empire.
997	Koppány's revolt The execution of Koppány (Chronicon Pictum, 1358)	Principality of Hungary; Holy Roman Empire	Koppány's Army	Koppány's defeat
1002	King Stephen I's military campaign against Gyula of Transylvania King Saint Stephen of Hungary captures his uncle Gyula, the ruler of Transylvania (Chronicon Pictum, 1358)	Hungarian Royal Army	Gyula III of Transylvania	Successful campaign of King Saint Stephen of Hungary: "Gyula" meant the second highest title in Hungarian tribal confederation. Gyula's ancestor was among the seven chieftains of the conquering Hungarians, who finally settled in Transylvania. Gyula's family ruled Transylvania in Gyulafehérvár (Alba Iulia). Gyula II was baptised in Constantinople around 952.; After the coronation King Stephen I asserted his claim to rule all lands dominated by Hungarian lords.; King Stephen I personally led his army against his maternal uncle, and Gyula III surrendered without a fight, Gyula III and his family was captured.; Transylvania was incorporated with the Kingdom of Hungary.; The establishment of the Roman Catholic Diocese of Transylvania in 1009.
1008 (?), 1029 (?)	King Stephen I's military campaign against Ajtony, a tribal leader in the Banat	Kingdom of Hungary	Ajtony's Army	Successful campaign, Ajtony's defeat
1017–1018	Hungarian – Polish war	Kingdom of Hungary	Duchy of Poland	Stalemate
~1018	Pecheneg attack against Hungary	Kingdom of Hungary	Pecheneg tribes	Hungarian victory
1018	Hungarian – Bulgarian War King Saint Stephen of Hungary defeats Kean "Duke of the Bulgarians and Slavs" (Chronicon Pictum, 1358)	Kingdom of Hungary; Byzantine Empire	First Bulgarian Empire	Hungarian – Byzantine victory
1018	The intervention of Boleslaw the Brave, Duke of Poland in the Kievan succession crisis: Battle of the River Bug	Duchy of Poland; Kingdom of Hungary; Holy Roman Empire; Pechenegs	Kievan Rus'	Temporary victory for Sviatopolk and Bolesław, Polish sack of Kiev
1030–1031	German–Hungarian War	Kingdom of Hungary	Holy Roman Empire	Hungarian victory: Military campaign of Emperor Conrad II's against Hungary; The Holy Roman Empire fails to subjugate Hungary; The Hungarians occupied Vienna.; Hungary is granted the lands between the rivers Leitha and Fischa
1041	Uprising against King Peter Orseolo King Peter Orseolo (Chronicon Pictum, 1358)	Hungarian Army	Hungarian nobles	Suppression of King Peter
1042–1043	German – Hungarian wars	Kingdom of Hungary	Holy Roman Empire	Hungarian defeat
1044	Henry III's military campaign against Hungary: Battle of Ménfő; Battle of Ménfő, on the right side of the picture Emperor Henry III gives thanks for victory, on the left a soldier executes King Samuel Aba (Chronicon Pictum, 1358)	The army of King Samuel Aba	Holy Roman Empire; Peter Orseolo and his allies	Defeat of Samuel Aba, restoration of Peter
1046	War between King Peter and Prince Andrew The blinding of King Peter, Prince Andrew takes the Hungarian crown (Chronicon Pictum, 1358)	King Peter's army Holy Roman Empire	Prince Andrew's army Kievan Rus'	Hungarian victory
1046	Vata pagan uprising Pagans slaughtering priests and the martyrdom of Bishop Gerard of Csanád (Anjou Legendarium, 1330)	King Peter, later King Andrew I	Paganic rebels	Prince Andrew's victory: During this rebellion, Vata gained power over a group of rebels who wished to abolish Christian rule and revert to paganism.; Bishop Gerard of Csanád invited Vazul's exiled sons to the country.; Prince Andrew and Levente returned to Hungary from their exile and quickly gained popular support for the throne, especially among the pagan populace, despite the fact that Andrew was Christian (Levente had remained pagan). On their return, a rebellion began, which Andrew and Levente initially supported. The princes accepted the claims of the rebels in exchange for fighting against King Peter.; King Peter decided to flee from Hungary and take refuge in Austria. Andrew's envoys tricked the king before he reached the frontier. King Peter fled to a fortified manor at Zámoly, but his opponents captured him. King Peter was blinded, which caused his death.; The pagans slaughtered priests and Bishop Gerard of Csanád.; Prince Andrew pronounced himself king.; King Andrew soon broke with his pagan supporters, restored Christianity and declared pagan rites illegal.
1051–1052: 1051	Emperor Henry III's military campaigns against Hungary: Battle of Vértes	Kingdom of Hungary	Holy Roman Empire; Duchy of Bohemia	Hungarian victory
1052	Emperor Henry III's fifth military campaign against Hungary The destruction of Emperor Henry III ships at the Castle of Pozsony (Chronicon Pictum, 1358)	Kingdom of Hungary	Holy Roman Empire	Hungarian victory: German Emperor Henry III undertook a fifth campaign against the Kingdom of Hungary, and besieged Pozsony without success, as the Hungarians sank his supply ships on the Danube river.
1056–1058	German – Hungarian border war	Kingdom of Hungary	Holy Roman Empire	Stalemate, treaty of Marchfeld
1060	Civil war between King Andrew I and his brother, Prince Béla: Battle of Moson	King Andrew I's army Holy Roman Empire	Prince Béla's army Kingdom of Poland	Prince Béla's victory
1061	Second paganic uprising	Hungarian army	Paganic rebels	Uprising suppressed
1063	German invasion of Hungary	Kingdom of Hungary	Holy Roman Empire	Hungarian defeat
1067	Croatian campaign	Kingdom of Hungary	Duchy of Carinthia	Hungarian victory: King Solomon of Hungary and Prince Géza of Hungary helped his brother-in-law Demetrius Zvonimir of Croatia to recapture Dalmatia from the Carinthians.
1068	Hungarian – Bohemian war	Kingdom of Hungary	Holy Roman Empire; Duchy of Bohemia	King Solomon of Hungary occupies Bohemia
1068	Pecheneg attack against Hungary: Battle of Kerlés / Cserhalom; Saint Ladislaus is fighting a duel with a Cuman warrior who kidnapped a girl (Chronicon Pictum, 1358)	Kingdom of Hungary	Pechenegs; Ouzes	Hungarian victory
1071–1072	Hungarian – Byzantine war: Siege of Belgrade; King Solomon and Prince Géza receive gifts from the locals at Niš (Chronicon Pictum, 1358)	Kingdom of Hungary	Byzantine Empire; Pechenegs	Hungarian victory: Pecheneg troops pillaged Syrmia in 1071. The king and the duke suspected that the soldiers of the Byzantine garrison at Belgrade incited the marauders against Hungary, so they decided to attack the fortress.; The Hungarian army crossed the river Sava, although the Byzantines used Greek fire against their boats. The Hungarians defeated the Pechenegs who helped the Byzantines to relieve the siege. Finally the Hungarians took Belgrade after a siege of three months.; King Solomon and Prince Géza marched along the valley of the river Great Morava as far as Niš. The Hungarians seized the Byzantine city without any resistance.
1074	Civil war between King Solomon and his cousins Géza and Ladislaus: Battle of Kemej; Battle of Mogyoród; Battle of Mogyoród (Chronicon Pictum, 1358)	King Solomon's army Holy Roman Empire; Duchy of Bohemia	Prince Géza's army Prince Ladislaus's army Prince Otto's army	Prince Géza and Ladislaus defeat the armies of King Solomon and Emperor Henry IV. King Solomon was dethroned.
1075	Henry IV's military campaign against Hungary The Escape of King Solomon (Chronicon Pictum, 1358)	Kingdom of Hungary	Holy Roman Empire; Solomon's army	Hungarian victory
The Campaigns of King Ladislaus I (1079–1095)
1079	Henry IV's military campaign against King Saint Ladislaus	Kingdom of Hungary	Holy Roman Empire	Hungarian victory
1085	Cuman attack against Hungary King Saint Ladislaus, the knight-king (fresco in the church of Székelyderzs, 1419)	Kingdom of Hungary	Cuman tribes Solomon's army	Hungarian victory: King Saint Ladislaus planned to make peace and an agreement with Solomon, the former king of Hungary, but Solomon soon began conspiring against Ladislaus, and Ladislaus imprisoned him.; The first five Hungarian saints, including the first king of Hungary, Stephen I, and Stephen's son, Emeric, were canonized during Ladislaus's reign. Ladislaus released Solomon at the time of the ceremony. After his release, Solomon made a final effort to regain his crown. He persuaded a Cuman chieftain, Kutesk, to invade Hungary. Solomon promised Kutesk that he would give him the right of possession over the province of Transylvania and would take his daughter as wife. King Ladislaus defeated the invaders.; At the head of a large contingent, Solomon joined a huge army of Cumans and Pechenegs who invaded the Byzantine Empire in 1087. The Byzantines routed the invaders, Solomon seems to have died fighting on the battlefield.
1091	Hungarian conquest of Croatia King Saint Ladislaus of Hungary crosses the river Drava to conquer Croatia (painting by Bertalan Székely, 19th century)	Kingdom of Hungary	Kingdom of Croatia	Hungarian victory: King Demetrius Zvonimir of Croatia was a member of the House of Trpimirović, he married Helen of Hungary from the Árpád dynasty in 1063. Helen was a Hungarian princess, daughter of King Béla I of Hungary, and sister to King Ladislaus I of Hungary. There was no living male member of the House of Trpimirović in 1091, civil war broke out in Croatia.; The widow of King Zvonimir, Helen tried to keep her power in Croatia during the succession crisis. Several Dalmatian cities and Croatian nobles around Helen asked King Ladislaus I to help Helen and offered him the Croatian throne, which was seen as rightfully his by inheritance rights.; In 1091 Ladislaus I crossed the Drava river and conquered the entire province of Slavonia without encountering opposition, Ladislaus I had success in his campaign, yet he wasn't able to establish his control over entire Croatia.; Ladislaus I appointed his nephew Prince Álmos to administer the controlled area of Croatia, established the Diocese of Zagreb as a symbol of his new authority and went back to Hungary.; Petar Snačić rose up against the Hungarian rule between 1093 and 1097.
1091	Cuman attack against Hungary Saint Ladislaus is chasing and fighting a duel with a Cuman warrior (Chronica Hungarorum, 1488)	Kingdom of Hungary	Cuman tribes	Hungarian victory: The Cumans invaded and plundered Hungary led by chieftain Kapolcs, first breaking through Transylvania, then the territory between the Danube and Tisza rivers. They tried to leave Hungary with their booty and prisoners, but King Ladislaus I defeated them near the Temes river.; King Ladislaus I offered Christianity to the Cuman survivors; most accepted and were settled in Jászság, in the Kingdom of Hungary.
1092	Ruthenian campaign by King Saint Ladislaus The Ruthenians pledge allegiance to King Saint Ladislaus (Chronicon Pictum, 1358)	Kingdom of Hungary	Kievan Rus'	Hungarian victory: King Ladislaus I blamed the Ruthenians for the Cuman invasion and invaded neighboring Rus' principalities, forcing them to pledge loyalty and obedience.
1094	King Ladislaus I's intervention in a Polish conflict Siege of Kraków (Chronicon Pictum, 1358)	Kingdom of Hungary	Kingdom of Poland	Hungarian victory: Władysław I Herman, Duke of Poland, was a cousin of King Ladislaus I of Hungary. King Ladislaus I intervened in a conflict between Herman and his illegitimate son, Zbigniew, capturing Herman's younger son Boleslaus and Kraków. At Ladislaus' demand, Zbigniew was recognized as legitimate.
The Campaigns of King Coloman (1095–1116)
1095	Campaign in Apulia	Kingdom of Hungary; Republic of Venice	Principality of Taranto	Hungarian victory: King Coloman seized Croatia; Doge Vitale I Michiel of Venice requested Hungarian support against the Normans. The Hungarian army, transported by Venetian ships, defeated the Normans, captured Brindisi and Monopoli, plundered the land, then withdrew after three months leaving cities to Venice.
1096	First Crusade: King Coloman's defensive operations against crusaders King Coloman meets Godfrey of Bouillon (13th century)	Kingdom of Hungary	French and German crusaders	Hungarian victories: The first group of crusaders was led by Walter Sans Avoir with 150,000 troops. King Coloman received them in a friendly way and allowed them into the kingdom. They proceeded through Hungary without any major conflicts, the only incident occurred near the Hungarian–Byzantine border at Zimony.; The next group was headed by Peter the Hermit with 40,000 troops. King Coloman permitted them to enter Hungary only after Peter pledged that he would prevent them from pillaging the countryside, but Peter could not keep his promise, the crusaders plundered and raped locals. They reached Zimony, where they learned of the story of the previous conflict. The crusaders besieged and took the town, where they massacred many thousand Hungarians. They only withdrew when Coloman's troops approached them.; The third band of crusaders was led by Folkmar with 12,000 men reached Nyitra and when they saw the richness of the countryside they began plundering the region. These were soon routed by the local Hungarians.; A fourth army that came to Moson was led by Gottschalk with 15,000 men. They camped near Pannonhalma, to seize food and wine, the crusaders made frequent pillaging raids against the nearby settlements. King Coloman attacked and massacred the majority of them. The crusader mob of Gottschalk fled with 3,000 men from Hungary.; Following these incidents, King Coloman forbade the crusaders who arrived under the leadership of Count Emicho with 200,000 men to enter Hungary. The crusaders besieged Moson, their catapults destroyed the walls in two places, enabling them to storm into the fortress. King Coloman defended the fortress. After six weeks the morale of the crusader mob began to fail, which inspired the Hungarians, a panic broke out among the attackers that enabled the garrison to carry out a sortie and rout them, and most of the mob was slaughtered or drowned in the river.; The first crusader army organized by the Holy See was led by Godfrey of Bouillon with 80,000 troops. King Coloman agreed to meet with Godfrey in Sopron. The king allowed the crusaders to march through his kingdom but stipulated that Godfrey's younger brother Baldwin and his family should stay with him as hostages. The crusaders passed through Hungary peacefully along the right bank of the Danube, King Coloman and his army followed them on the left bank. He only released his hostages after all the crusaders had crossed the river Sava. The uneventful march of the main crusader army across Hungary established Coloman's good reputation throughout Europe.
1096	Occupation of Biograd na Moru / Tengerfehérvár	Kingdom of Hungary	Kingdom of Croatia	Hungarian occupation of Biograd na Moru: During the Apulia campaign, an agreement with Doge of Venice left part of Dalmatia up to Zadar under Venice; King Coloman occupied the south.
1097	War of the Croatian Succession: Battle of Gvozd Mountain; Death of the Last Croatian King (painting by Oton Iveković, 1894)	Kingdom of Hungary	Kingdom of Croatia	Decisive Hungarian victory: Petar Snačić opposed Hungarian rule; Coloman defeated him at Gvozd Mountain (1097).; Coloman crowned in Biograd na Moru (1102) as "King of Hungary, Dalmatia, and Croatia", creating a personal union (1102–1918).
1099	King Coloman's war against Kievan Rus'	Kingdom of Hungary	David Igorevich's army Cuman tribes	Hungarian defeat: Siege of Przemyśl; Cumans attacked, Hungarian army defeated.
1105	Siege of Zara and occupation of Dalmatia	Kingdom of Hungary	Dalmatian cities Republic of Venice	Hungarian victory
1107	Campaign in Apulia	Kingdom of Hungary; Byzantine Empire; Republic of Venice	Principality of Taranto	Hungarian victory: Hungarians aided Byzantines against Bohemond I; captured Brindisi and Monopoli, later ceded to Venice.
1108	Hungarian war with the Holy Roman Empire	Kingdom of Hungary	Holy Roman Empire; Duchy of Bohemia	Hungarian victory
1115–1119	Hungarian – Venetian wars	Kingdom of Hungary	Republic of Venice	Hungarian defeat
1123	Stephen II's intervention in Kievan Rus' internal conflict	Kingdom of Hungary	Iaroslav from Vladimir; Kievan Rus'	Hungarian retreat
1124–1125	Hungarian – Venetian war	Kingdom of Hungary	Republic of Venice	Hungarian defeat
1127–1129	Byzantine-Hungarian War (1127–29)	Kingdom of Hungary; Grand Principality of Serbia	Byzantine Empire	Stalemate, peace agreement
1132	Hungarian – Polish war	Kingdom of Hungary; Duchy of Austria	Kingdom of Poland	Hungarian victory
1136–1137	Béla II's Balkan campaigns	Kingdom of Hungary	Byzantine Empire; Republic of Venice	Hungarian victory
1146	Battle of the Fischa The Battle of the Fischa (Chronica Hungarorum, 1488)	Kingdom of Hungary	Duchy of Bavaria; Duchy of Austria	Hungarian victory
1149–1152	Géza II's intervention in Principality of Halych vs Kievan Rus'	Kingdom of Hungary; Kievan Rus'	Principality of Halych	Peace agreement
1149–1155	Hungarian–Byzantine wars	Kingdom of Hungary; Grand Principality of Serbia	Byzantine Empire	Ceasefire
1154	Siege of Braničevo	Kingdom of Hungary; Cumans	Byzantine Empire	Abandoned siege, Hungarian retreat
1162–1165	Hungarian civil war: Stephen III vs uncles Ladislaus & Stephen	Kingdom of Hungary; Holy Roman Empire	Ladislaus & Stephen's army Byzantine Empire	Stephen III's victory
1167	Battle of Sirmium	Kingdom of Hungary; Banate of Bosnia	Byzantine Empire; Serbian Grand Principality	Decisive Byzantine victory; Hungary lost Dalmatia
1168	Hungarian–Bohemian war	Kingdom of Hungary	Holy Roman Empire; Duchy of Bohemia	Hungarian victory
1176	Battle of Myriokephalon	Byzantine Empire; Kingdom of Hungary; Principality of Antioch; Grand Principality of Serbia	Sultanate of Rum	Seljuk victory: Military balance maintained; Hungarian auxiliaries commanded by Palatine Ampud & Leustach Rátót under Béla III
1180–1185	Hungarian–Byzantine war	Kingdom of Hungary; Grand Principality of Serbia (1183–1185)	Byzantine Empire	Hungarian victory; Hungary reoccupied Dalmatia
1188–1189	King Béla III's campaign against Halych	Kingdom of Hungary	Principality of Halych	Hungarian victory; occupation of Halych
1190	Third Crusade: Battle of Iconium	Holy Roman Empire; Kingdom of Hungary	Sultanate of Rum	Crusader victory; main Seljuk army routed: Main Seljuk army routed.; Sultanate of Rum's capital city sacked.; Géza, Prince of Hungary, the younger brother of King Béla III joined by a contingent of 2,000 men to Frederick Barbarossa to participate in the Third Crusade.; About 5,000 Imperials and Hungarians under Duke Frederick joined the Siege of Acre in October.
1192-1193	Attack of the Hungarian King Bela III on the Grand Principality of Serbia	Kingdom of Hungary	Grand Principality of Serbia Byzantine Empire	Defeat: Hungarian invasion of the Grand Principality of Serbia prompted the intervention of Isaac II Angelos against the invaders; Retreat of the Hungarian army; Stefan Nemanja preserves his throne and state
1198	Attack of Andrew II of Hungary on Hum	Kingdom of Hungary	Grand Principality of Serbia	Inconclusive: Duke Andrew II of Hungary invades Hum, then part of the Grand Principality of Serbia, occupies a part of it temporarily, but then loses it; Hum remains a part of the Grand Principality of Serbia
1197–1203	Brothers' quarrel, civil war between King Emeric and his brother Andrew Emeric captures his rebellious younger brother Andrew (painting by Mór Than, 1857)	Emeric's army	Andrew's army	1197 (Andrew's victory); 1199 (Emeric's victory); 1203 (Emeric's victory)
1201–1205	Emeric's balcanic wars	Kingdom of Hungary	Second Bulgarian Empire; Grand Principality of Serbia Bosnia	Hungarian victories
1202	Fourth Crusaide: Siege of Zara	Kingdom of Hungary; Kingdom of Croatia	Soldiers of the Fourth Crusade; Republic of Venice	Hungarian defeat: Venetians and Crusaders sacked the city
1213–1214, 1219, 1233–1234	King Andrew II's military campaigns against Halych	Kingdom of Hungary	Principality of Halych	Hungarian defeat
1217–1218	King Andrew II's participation in the Fifth Crusade: Battle of Bethsaida; King Andrew II at the head of his crusader army (Chronicon Pictum, 1358)	Kingdom of Hungary; Duchy of Austria; Latin Empire of Constantinople	Ayyubids	Hungarian victories on the battlefields. Muslim forces retreated to their fortresses and towns.
1225	King Andrew II expels the Teutonic Knights from Transylvania, the order had to move to Poland	Kingdom of Hungary	Teutonic Knights	Hungarian victory
1237–1241	Bosnian Crusade The Hungarian successes were followed by quick Hungarian retreat because of the Mongol invasion of Hungary	Coloman of Galicia-Lodomeria	"Heretics" within the Banate of Bosnia	Stalemate after the quick Hungarian retreat due to the Mongol attacks
1241–1242	First Mongol invasion of Hungary: Battle of Mohi; Siege of Esztergom; Battle of Grobnik Field	Kingdom of Hungary	Mongols	Mongol victory at the Battle of Mohi. Mongols retreated within a year from Hungary due to the local Hungarian withstand. Both sides suffered a heavy casualties.
1242	King Béla IV's punishing campaign against Frederick II, Duke of Austria	Kingdom of Hungary	Duchy of Austria	Hungarian victory
1243	Siege of Zara	Kingdom of Hungary	Republic of Venice	Hungarian defeat
1246–1282	War of the Babenberg Succession: Battle of the Leitha River; Battle of Kressenbrunn; Battle on the Marchfeld	Kingdom of Hungary Kingdom of Croatia; Kingdom of Poland; Principality of Halych Duchy of Austria	Kingdom of Bohemia; Margraviate of Moravia; Duchy of Austria; Duchy of Styria; Duchy of Silesia; Duchy of Carinthia	Hungarian defeat: Hungary loses control of Styria; Habsburgs gain possession of Austria
1250–1278	Hungarian – Bohemian wars	Kingdom of Hungary; Holy Roman Empire	Kingdom of Bohemia; Duchy of Austria	Bohemian defeat
1259	Battle of Pelagonia	Empire of Nicaea; Cuman cavalry Hungarian mounted archers Turkish cavalry Serbian horsemen German knights	Despotate of Epirus; Principality of Achaea; Duchy of Athens; Duchy of the Archipelago; Triarchy of Negroponte; Kingdom of Sicily	Decisive Nicaean victory
1261–1262	Occupation of Konstantin Tih's Bulgarian Empire by King Béla IV.	Kingdom of Hungary	Second Bulgarian Empire	Hungarian victory
1264–1265	Internal conflict between King Béla IV and his son, Stephen: Battle of Isaszeg	King Béla IV's army	Duke Stephen's army	Stephen's victory, he got eastern Hungary as a duchy
1268	Mačva War Béla IV 's army captures Stefan Uroš I. Their conflict was solved with dynastic marriage.	Béla IV of Hungary	Kingdom of Serbia (medieval), Stefan Uroš I	Hungarian victory
1272–1279	Feudal anarchy	King Ladislaus IV; Csák noble family	Kőszegi noble family Gutkeled noble family	Royal victory
1277	Stefan Dragutin – Stefan Uroš I conflict	Stefan Dragutin; Kingdom of Hungary	Kingdom of Serbia (medieval) Stefan Uroš I	Hungarian victory
1277	Hungary's war with Litovoi in Cumania	Kingdom of Hungary	Litovoi's army	Hungarian victory
1282	Cumanic uprising: Battle of Lake Hód	Kingdom of Hungary	Cumanic tribes	Hungarian victory
1285–1286	Second Mongol invasion of Hungary Mongols in Hungary in 1285 (Chronicon Pictum, 1358)	Kingdom of Hungary	Golden Horde	Decisive Hungarian victory
1287–1288	Third Mongol invasion of Poland	Kingdom of Poland; Kingdom of Hungary	Golden Horde; Kingdom of Galicia–Volhynia	Polish – Hungarian victory
1291	German – Hungarian war	Kingdom of Hungary	Holy Roman Empire	Hungarian victory
1290–1301	Croato–Hungarian war of succession after the death of king Ladislaus IV of Hungary and Croatia	Árpád dynasty Šubić family	House of Anjou; Kőszegi family	Indecisive: Árpáds were winning militarily, but Andrew III's death in 1301 extinguished the Árpád dynasty and triggered the Árpád war of succession in Hungary (1301–1308); Paul I Šubić of Bribir became de facto independent ruler of Croatia
1298	Battle of Göllheim	Duchy of Austria; Kingdom of Bohemia; Kingdom of Hungary	County of Nassau; Electoral Palatinate	Habsburg victory

=== Wars between 1301 and 1526 ===
Date	Conflict	Allies	Enemies	Result
1301–1308	Árpád war of succession, after the extinction of the Árpád dynasty	Charles Robert of Anjou; Duchy of Austria; Matthew III Csák's army László Kán's army	Kingdom of Bohemia; Duchy of Bavaria; Kőszegi Hungarian noble family	Angevin victory: Charles Robert of Anjou became Hungarian king
1310–1321	King Charles I's wars for the centralized power against the Hungarian aristocracy: Battle of Rozgony	Kingdom of Hungary; Order of Saint John; Zipser Saxons	Matthew III Csák; Aba dynasty Borsa family Apor family Kőszegi family	Royal victory: Centralization of the Hungarian Kingdom
1319	Belgrade and Banate of Mačva	Charles I of Hungary	Kingdom of Serbia (medieval), Stefan Milutin	Victory for Charles I
1322–1337	Hungarian – Austrian War	Kingdom of Hungary	Duchy of Austria; Holy Roman Empire; Kőszegi family Babonić Croatian noble family	Hungarian victory: Restoration of the western borders, defeat of Austria, Kőszegi and Babonić families
1321–1324	Hungarian–Serbian War	Kingdom of Hungary; Bosnia; Stephen Vladislav II of Syrmia	Kingdom of Serbia (medieval)	Hungarian defeat
1330	Hungarian-Wallachian War: Battle of Posada; Battle of Posada (Chronicon Pictum, 1358)	Kingdom of Hungary	Wallachia	Hungarian defeat: The Wallachian army led by Basarab, formed of cavalry, peasants and foot archers, ambushed and defeated the 30,000-strong Hungarian army, in a mountainous region
1344	King Louis the Great's invasion and occupation of Wallachia and Moldavia	Kingdom of Hungary	Wallachia; Moldavia	Hungarian victory, Wallachia and Moldavia became vassal states of King Louis the Great
1345–1358	Hungarian – Venetian War: Siege of Zadar (1345–1346)	Kingdom of Hungary Kingdom of Croatia Dalmatian city-states	Republic of Venice	Decisive Hungarian victory with the Treaty of Zadar. Venice had to pay annual tribute to Louis. Venetians also had to raise the Angevin flag on Piazza San Marco. End of the Croatian–Venetian wars
1345	The campaign of King Louis I against the rebellious Croatian nobles The campaign of King Louis I against the rebellious Croatian nobles (Chronica Hungarorum, 1488)	Kingdom of Hungary	Croatian nobles	Hungarian victory
1345	Hungary's war with the Golden Horde	Kingdom of Hungary	Golden Horde	Hungarian victory: The Golden Horde was pushed back behind the Dniester River, the Golden Horde's control of the lands between the Eastern Carpathians and the Black Sea weakened; The establishment of Moldavia in 1346 as a Hungarian vassal state.
1347–1349, 1350–1352	Hungarian-Naples Wars The battle of Voivode Stephen Lackfi against Louis of Taranto around Naples (Chronica Hungarorum, 1488)	Kingdom of Hungary	Kingdom of Naples	First campaign: temporary Hungarian victory Second campaign: status quo ante bellum
1348	Battle of Capua	Kingdom of Hungary	Kingdom of Naples	Hungarian victory, occupation of the kingdom
1356–1359	Crusade against Francesco Ordelaffi	Pope Innocent VI Kingdom of Hungary	Francesco II Ordelaffi	Victory
1360–1369	Louis I's balcanic wars (against Serbia, Bulgaria, Wallachia and Bosnia)	Kingdom of Hungary	Serbian Empire; Second Bulgarian Empire; Bosnia; Wallachia	Temporary Hungarian victories
1366–1367	Hungarian – Ottoman War	Kingdom of Hungary; Duchy of Savoya; Padua; Republic of Venice; Kingdom of France; Byzantine Empire	Ottoman Empire; Second Bulgarian Empire	Christian victory
1369	Wallachian campaign	Kingdom of Hungary	Wallachia	Hungarian victory
1372–1381	War of Chioggia, Hungary defeated the Venetians in several times, and finally expelled Venetians from Dalmatia, however Genoa, Padoa and Austria lost the War. The war resulted in the Treaty of Turin (1381)	Kingdom of Hungary Padua; Republic of Genoa; Duchy of Austria	Republic of Venice; Milan; Ottoman Empire; Kingdom of Cyprus	Hungarian victory, Venice had to pay annual tribute to King of Hungary
1375–1377	Hungarian–Ottoman War Victory of Louis the Great of Hungary against the Ottomans in Bulgaria (St. Lambert's Abbey, 1420)	Kingdom of Hungary Kingdom of Poland	Ottoman Empire; Second Bulgarian Empire	Hungarian victory
1377	Hungarian – Lithuanian war	Kingdom of Hungary	Grand Duchy of Lithuania	Hungarian victory, Louis I enters Vilnius
1384–1394	Civil war between a part of the Hungarian nobility and Mary, Queen of Hungary and Sigismund king	Kingdom of Hungary	Horváti family Kingdom of Naples	Sigismund's victory
1389–1396	Hungarian–Ottoman War: Battle of Nicopolis; Battle of Nicopolis (painting by Sébastien Mamerot, 1472–1475)	Kingdom of Hungary; Holy Roman Empire; Kingdom of France; Knights Hospitaller; Duchy of Burgundy; Duchy of Savoy; Wallachia; Lands of the Bohemian Crown; Kingdom of Poland; Kingdom of Croatia; Swiss Confederacy; Kingdom of England; Republic of Venice; Republic of Genoa; Crown of Castile; Crown of Aragon; Kingdom of Navarre; Second Bulgarian Empire; Teutonic Order; Byzantine Empire	Ottoman Empire; Moravian Serbia	Crusader defeat: King Sigismund of Hungary had experience fighting with the Ottomans, but the French knights refused his battle plan. The French knights rushed to the Ottoman lines, while the other allies stayed with the Hungarian forces under King Sigismund, this caused confusion and divided the strength of the Crusader army.; Ottomans defeat Crusades and no new Anti-Ottoman alliance is formed till the 1440s.; Ottomans maintain pressure on Constantinople, tightened control over the Balkans, and became a greater threat to central Europe.; Collapse of Second Bulgarian Empire.
1394–1395	Wallachian campaign	Kingdom of Hungary	Wallachia	Wallachia became a Hungarian vassal, Mircea I the Great accepted the lordship of King Sigismund without any fight.
1394–1395	Moldavian campaign	Kingdom of Hungary	Moldavia	Hungarian victory: Moldavia became a Hungarian vassal.; King Sigismund of Hungary occupied Suceava the capital of Stephen I of Moldavia.
1407–1408	Bosnian campaign: Battle of Dobor	Kingdom of Hungary	Kingdom of Bosnia	Hungarian victory: King Sigismund achieved a decisive victory over Tvrtko II of Bosnia, 126 members of Bosnian nobility were massacred.; King Sigismund founded the Order of the Dragon as a celebration of the reoccupation of Bosnia and Dalmatia when he married Barbara of Cilli.
1411–1433	Hungarian – Venetian War: Battle of Motta (1412)	Kingdom of Hungary; Milan	Republic of Venice	Dalmatia became part of Venice
1415–1419	Hungarian – Ottoman War	Kingdom of Hungary	Ottoman Empire	Stalemate
1419–1434	Hussite Wars: Battle of Vítkov Hill Battle of Vyšehrad; Battle of Kutná Hora; Battle of Nebovidy; Battle of Německý Brod; Battle of Trnava; Battle of Ilava	Holy Roman Empire; Kingdom of Hungary Moderate Hussites (since 1423)	Hussites (mostly united until 1434) Radical Hussites (since 1434)	Victory of the moderate Hussites and Catholics over the radical Hussites.: Compromise between moderate Hussites and the Catholic Church; both join forces to fight the radical Hussites; The moderate Hussites are recognized by the Catholic Church and allowed to practice their own rite; The radical Hussites are defeated, and their rites forbidden; Sigismund of Luxembourg becomes King of Bohemia; The Basel Compacts, signed by Emperor Sigismund and Catholic and Hussite representatives, effectively end the Hussite Wars
1420–1432	War of the South Danube: Siege of Golubac	Kingdom of Hungary; Wallachia; Grand Duchy of Lithuania	Ottoman Empire	Armistice
1437	Transylvanian peasant revolt of Budai Nagy Antal	Transylvanian aristocracy	Transylvanian peasants	Defeat of the rebels: Establishment of Unio Trium Nationum.
1437–1442	Hungarian–Ottoman War: Raid on Kruševac (1437); Transylvanian campaign (1438); Siege of Belgrade (1440); Battle of Smederevo (1441); Battle of Szentimre (1442); Battle of the Iron Gate (1442); Battle of the Ialomița (1442)	Kingdom of Hungary	Ottoman Empire	Hungarian victory
1440–1442	Hungarian Civil War (1440–1442)	Supporters of King Vladislaus I; John Hunyadi; Nicholas Újlaki	Supporters of Elizabeth of Luxembourg and King Ladislaus V; Ulrich Cillei	Peace agreement, Vladislaus is accepted as Hungarian king: John Hunyadi and Nicholas Újlaki annihilated the troops of Vladislaus opponents at Bátaszék at the beginning of 1441. Their victory effectively put an end to the civil war.; The grateful king appointed Hunyadi and Újlaki joint Voivodes of Transylvania and Counts of the Székelys. Hunyadi was appointed as head of several southern counties of the Kingdom of Hungary, he assumed responsibility for the defense of the frontiers.
1443–1444	Long campaign: Battle of Nish; Battle of Aleksinac; Battle of Zlatitsa; Battle of Melstica; Battle of Kunovica; The Long Campaign of John Hunyad against the Ottomans (Chronica Hungarorum, 1488)	Kingdom of Hungary	Ottoman Empire	Hungarian victory: Peace of Szeged
1444	Battle of Varna King Władysław III of Poland / Vladislaus I of Hungary in the Battle of Varna (painting by Jan Matejko, 1879)	Kingdom of Hungary; Kingdom of Poland; Kingdom of Croatia; Grand Duchy of Lithuania; Crown of Bohemia; Wallachia; Bulgarian rebels Kingdom of Bosnia; Papal States; Teutonic Knights	Ottoman Empire	Crusader defeat: Vladislaus I of Hungary, the young king, ignoring Hunyadi's advice, rushed 500 of his Polish knights against the Ottoman center. They attempted to overrun the Janissary infantry and take Murad II prisoner, and almost succeeded, but in front of Murad's tent Vladislaus's horse either fell, and the king was slain.; Murad's casualties at Varna were so heavy, it was not until three days later that he realized he was victorious.; The Ottoman victory in Varna, followed by the Ottoman victory in the Second Battle of Kosovo in 1448, deterred the European states from sending any substantial military assistance to the Byzantines during the Ottoman Siege of Constantinople in 1453.
1447	Wallachian campaign	Kingdom of Hungary	Wallachia; Ottoman Empire	Hungarian victory: John Hunyadi deprived Vlad II Dracul from the Wallachian throne, because Vlad II Dracul captured Hunyadi after the Battle of Varna.; Hunyadi placed Vladislav II on the throne of Wallachia.; Hunyadi also drove a small Ottoman army out of Wallachia.
1445–1448	Hungarian–Ottoman War: Second Battle of Kosovo / Rigómező; An akinji is dragging an incapacitated Hungarian knight (Süleymanname, 16th century)	Kingdom of Hungary; Wallachia	Ottoman Empire; Wallachia (Switched to the Ottoman side on the third day of the battle)	Ottoman victory
1449– 1456	Hungarian–Ottoman War: Battle of Kruševac; Siege of Belgrade / Nándorfehérvár	Kingdom of Hungary	Ottoman Empire	Hungarian victory
1458–1459	Matthias I's war with Ján Jiskra	Kingdom of Hungary	Jiskra's soldiers	Royal victory
1458–1465	War in Bosnia: Siege of Jajce	Kingdom of Hungary	Ottoman Empire	Partial Bosnian territory occupied by the Ottoman Empire.
1465–1471	Hussite uprising in North-Hungary	Kingdom of Hungary	Czech hussite rebels	Hungarian victory
1467	Hungarian - Moldavian war: Battle of Baia / Moldvabánya	Kingdom of Hungary	Moldavia	Both side claimed victory
1468–1478	Bohemian War (1468–1478)	Kingdom of Hungary	Kingdom of Bohemia	Treaty of Olmütz, Matthias became king of Bohemia
1471	Hungarian – Polish war	Kingdom of Hungary	Kingdom of Poland	Hungarian victory: King Matthias I forced King Casimir IV to withdraw from Hungary
1471–1476	Matthias's intervention in the Moldovian – Ottoman War: Battle of Vaslui	Kingdom of Hungary; Moldavia	Ottoman Empire	After initial Hungarian-moldavian victories Hungary stopped the advocating of Moldavia, so Stephen III moldavian ruler became vasal of the Ottoman Empire.
1476	Siege of Šabac / Szabács	Kingdom of Hungary	Ottoman Empire	King Matthias besieged and seized Šabac, an important Ottoman border fort
1477–1488	Austrian – Hungarian War: Siege of Vienna / Bécs	Kingdom of Hungary	Holy Roman Empire	Decisive Hungarian victory: At the end of the campaign, Hungary controlled all of Upper Austria as well, which remained under the control of King Matthias until his death, in 1490.
1479	Battle of Breadfield / Kenyérmező Battle of Breadfield (Colorized lithography from Eduard Gurk after Ion Osolsobie, 19th century)	Kingdom of Hungary	Ottoman Empire; Wallachia	Hungarian victory: Hungary defeats the highly outnumbered Ottoman army in Transylvania. Ottoman casualties were extremely high. The battle was the most significant victory for the Hungarians against the raiding Ottomans, and as a result, the Ottoman Turks did not attack southern Hungary and Transylvania for many years thereafter.
1480–1481	Battle of Otranto	Kingdom of Hungary; Kingdom of Naples; Crown of Aragon; Kingdom of Sicily; Papal States	Ottoman Empire	Christian victory
1490–1491	War of the Hungarian Succession	Kingdom of Hungary; Kingdom of Bohemia	Kingdom of Poland	Treaty
1490	Battle of Bonefield	The supporters of John Corvinus	The supporters of Beatrice of Naples	The supporters of Beatrice of Naples, Stephen Báthory and Paul Kinizsi defeated John Corvinus.
1491–1495	Hungarian – Ottoman war	Kingdom of Hungary	Ottoman Empire	Stalemate
1492–1493	The Black Army's uprising	Kingdom of Hungary	Black Army	Destruction of the Black Army
1499–1504	Hungarian – Ottoman war	Kingdom of Hungary	Ottoman Empire	Stalemate
1512–1520	Hungarian – Ottoman war	Kingdom of Hungary	Ottoman Empire	Successful defensive operations against the Ottomans
1514	Peasants revolt, led by György Dózsa The execution of György Dózsa (Stephanus Taurinus: Stauromachia, id est, Cruciatorum servile bellum, 1519)	Kingdom of Hungary	Peasants	Revolt suppressed: Royal power declined in favour of the magnates, who used their power to curtail the peasants' freedom. Gyorgy led a revolt but was eventually caught, tortured, and executed and became known as a martyr or a dangerous criminal.
1521–1526	Hungarian-Ottoman War: Battle of Mohács	Kingdom of Hungary	Ottoman Empire	Hungarian defeat: Decisive downward turning point in Hungarian history.; Destruction of the Kingdom of Hungary as an independent and powerful European nation.; The territory of Hungary was split into two parts in 1529 and into three parts in 1541.; Around two hundred years of constant warfare with and between two empires, Habsburg and Ottoman, turned Hungary into a perpetual battlefield. The countryside was regularly ravaged by armies moving back and forth devastating the population.

== Wars between 1526 and 1699 ==
Date	Conflict	Allies	Enemies	Result
1526–1538	Hungarian Civil War: Hungarian campaign of 1527–1528; German tidings of the campaign of Ferdinand I, in Hungary, 1527	Kingdom of Hungary; Habsburg monarchy	Ottoman Empire; Eastern Hungarian Kingdom	Inconclusive: Treaty of Nagyvárad; Hungary officially split into two parts; Ottomans gain influence in Eastern Hungary
1526–1527	Jovan Nenad uprising	Eastern Hungarian Kingdom	Serbs of Vojvodina	Hungarian victory
1529–1533	Habsburg–Ottoman war: Campaign of 1529	Habsburg monarchy Kingdom of Hungary	Ottoman Empire; Moldavia	Ottoman victory: Truce of Constantinople (1533)
1540–1547	Habsburg–Ottoman war: Siege of Esztergom	Kingdom of Hungary; Habsburg monarchy	Ottoman Empire; Eastern Hungarian Kingdom	Ottoman victory: Buda, Pest, Esztergom and most of central Hungary under Ottoman control; Szapolyai reduced to Eastern Hungary; Vienna forced to pay tribute
1550–1558	Habsburg–Ottoman war: Siege of Eger	Kingdom of Hungary Habsburg monarchy	Ottoman Empire	Ottoman victory: Ottomans capture Temesvár, Szolnok, Veszprém, and Nógrád; Ottoman attack on Eger repelled by Hungarian defenders
1556–1567	Hungarian war of succession John Sigismund pays homage to the Ottoman Sultan Suleiman the Magnificent at Zemun on 29 June 1566.	Royal Hungary; Habsburg monarchy	Eastern Hungarian Kingdom; Zápolya family	Habsburg victory; Treaty of Szatmár (13 March 1565): John Sigismund Zápolya renounced his title of king of Hungary in favour of Maximilian II of Habsburg; He was recognised as prince of Transylvania under the Habsburg kings of Hungary; He agreed to marry Maximilian's sister Joanna.
1562	First Székely uprising	Eastern Hungarian Kingdom	Székelys	Eastern Hungarian victory
1565–1568	Habsburg–Ottoman war: Siege of Szigetvár	Kingdom of Hungary; Kingdom of Croatia	Ottoman Empire; Eastern Hungarian Kingdom	Ottoman victory: Ottomans capture Szigetvár; Death of Suleiman the Magnificent; Treaty of Adrianople
1575	Bekes uprising and the second Székely uprising	Principality of Transylvania	Kingdom of Hungary Székelys	Transylvanian victory
1575–1577	Danzig rebellion	Polish–Lithuanian Commonwealth; Principality of Transylvania	City of Gdańsk	Victory: The rebellion of the city of Danzig was a revolt from December 1575 to December 1577 of the city against the outcome of the 1576 Polish–Lithuanian royal election. The Polish throne was contested by Stephen Báthory and the Holy Roman Emperor Maximillian II.
1577–1583	Livonian campaign of Stephen Báthory	Polish–Lithuanian Commonwealth; Principality of Transylvania	Tsardom of Russia	Victory
1588	Battle of Szikszó	Kingdom of Hungary	Ottoman Empire	Hungarian victory
1593–1606	Fifteen Years' war: Battle of Călugăreni; Battle of Giurgiu / Gyurgyevó; Siege of Eger; Allegory of the Turkish war – The declaration of war before Constantinople	Kingdom of Hungary; Habsburg monarchy Principality of Transylvania Wallachia Moldavia	Ottoman Empire	Inconclusive: Peace of Zsitvatorok
1596	Third Székely uprising	Principality of Transylvania	Székelys	Transylvanian victory: Bloody Carnival
1604–1606	Bocskai's War of Independence Hungarian Prince of Transilvania Stephen Bocskay and his hajdú warriors	Habsburg monarchy	Hajduk Principality of Transylvania	Hungarian victory: Treaty of Vienna in 1606.; All constitutional and religious rights and privileges were granted to the Hungarians in both the Principality of Transylvania and Royal Hungary.; Stephen Bocskai was recognized as the Prince of Transylvania, and guaranteed the right of Transylvanians to elect their own independent princes in the future.; Preservation of an independent Transylvania, a potential base for the unification of Hungary.
1610–1611	Transylvanian Civil War	Principality of Transylvania Ottoman Empire	Wallachia Moldavia Transylvanian Saxons Kingdom of Hungary	Transylvanian (Báthory) victory
1612–1613	Ottoman–Transylvanian war	Principality of Transylvania (Báthorys) Habsburg monarchy: Kingdom of Hungary	Ottoman Empire Wallachia Moldavia	Ottoman victory: Gábor Báthory is replaced by Gábor Bethlen
1618–1648	Thirty Years' War: Transylvanian intervention of 1619–1621; Transylvanian intervention of 1623–1624; Transylvanian intervention of 1626; Transylvanian intervention of 1644–1645	Habsburg monarchy Spain Bavaria Catholic League	Principality of Transylvania (Kingdom of Bohemia) Bohemia Swedish Empire France	Inconclusive
1632	Peasants revolt, led by Péter Császár (in Transylvania and in the Royal Hungary)	Principality of Transylvania Habsburg monarchy: Kingdom of Hungary	Peasants	Revolt crushed
1636	Transylvanian Civil War	Principality of Transylvania: House of Rákóczi	Ottoman Empire: House of Bethlen	Transylvanian (Rákóczi) Victory
1652	Battle of Vezekény	Kingdom of Hungary	Ottoman Empire	Hungarian victory
1656–1657	Deluge: Transylvanian military campaign against Poland	Swedish Empire; Principality of Transylvania	Poland–Lithuania	Polish-Tatar Victory
1657–1662	Ottoman–Transylvanian war: Siege of Nagyvárad (1660)	Principality of Transylvania	Ottoman Empire	Ottoman victory: Ottomans capture Nagyvárad
1663–1664	Austro-Turkish War: Battle of Vízvár (1663); Winter Campaign (1664); Siege of Léva (1664); Battle of Saint Gotthard (1664)	Habsburg monarchy: Kingdom of Hungary	Ottoman Empire	Ottoman victory: Peace of Vasvár
1678–1685	Thököly Uprising Arrest of Imre Thököly in 1685	Habsburg monarchy: Kingdom of Hungary	Principality of Upper Hungary	Habsburg victory
1683–1699	Great Turkish War: Siege of Buda	Habsburg monarchy: Kingdom of Hungary; Holy Roman Empire: Margraviate of Brandenburg; Electorate of Bavaria; Duchy of Lorraine; Electorate of Saxony	Ottoman Empire	Holy League victory
1697	Hegyalja uprising	Habsburg monarchy: Kingdom of Hungary	Kuruc	Habsburg victory: Rebellion crushed

== Wars between 1700 and 1900 ==
Conflict		Belligerents		Result
Date	Name	Allies	Enemies	Outcome
15 June 1703 – 1 May 1711	Rákóczi's War for Independence Kuruc prepare to attack traveling coach and riders, c. 1705.	Kingdom of Hungary: Kuruc; Principality of Transylvania Kingdom of France Sympathetic minority peoples and mercenaries	Holy Roman Empire: Austria; Prussia; Margraviate of Baden; Serbs from the Military Frontier; Transylvanian Saxons; Kingdom of Croatia; Royalists; (Denmark) Danish Auxiliary Corps Mercenaries	Defeat: Crushing of rebellion
January 1716 – 21 July 1718	Austro-Turkish War (1716–1718) The Battle of Petrovaradin, 1716.	Habsburg Monarchy: Royal Hungarian regiments	Ottoman Empire: Kuruc renegades	Treaty of Passarowitz
27 April – 13 May 1735	Pero Uprising	Habsburg Monarchy	Hungarian peasant rebels Serb troops of Pera Segedinac	Habsburg victory: Pera captured before he could join the uprising; Peasant rebels crushed
1735 – 1 September 1739	Russo-Austro-Turkish War	Russian Empire Habsburg Monarchy	Ottoman Empire	Victory: Treaty of Niš; Treaty of Belgrade
16 December 1740 – 18 October 1748	War of the Austrian Succession Battle of Fontenoy, 1745	Habsburg Monarchy: Kingdom of Hungary; Great Britain (Province of Hanover) Hanover Dutch Republic Saxony (1743–45) Savoy-Sardinia (1742–48) Russia (1741–43, 1748)	France Prussia (1740–42, 1744–45) Spain Bavaria (1741–45) Saxony (1741–42) Savoy-Sardinia (1741–42) (Kingdom of Naples) Naples Genoa (1745–48) Sweden (1741–43)	Treaty of Aix-la-Chapelle; Maria Theresa retains the Austrian, Bohemian and Hungarian thrones; Francis of Lorraine, Maria Theresa's husband, confirmed as Holy Roman Emperor
17 May 1756 – 15 February 1763	Seven Years' War	France (Habsburg monarchy) Holy Roman Empire: Austria; Kingdom of Hungary; Saxony; Russia (until 1762); Spain (from 1762); Sweden (1757–62); Mughal Empire (from 1757); Abenaki Confederacy	Great Britain Prussia; Portugal (from 1762) (Province of Hanover) Hanover; Brunswick-Wolfenbüttel; Hesse-Kassel; Schaumburg-Lippe; Iroquois Confederacy	Status Quo Ante Bellum: Treaty of Saint Petersburg (1762); Treaty of Hamburg (1762); Treaty of Paris (1763); Treaty of Hubertusburg (1763)
31 October – 14 December 1784	Revolt of Horea, Cloșca and Crișan	Habsburg Monarchy: Kingdom of Hungary	Transylvanian Romanian rebels	Victory
20 April 1792 – 18 October 1797	War of the First Coalition	Holy Roman Empire: Habsburg monarchy; Prussia (until 1795); Great Britain (Kingdom of France) Army of Condé; Spain (until 1795); Dutch Republic (until 1795); Portugal; Sardinia (until 1796)	Kingdom of France (until 1792) (French First Republic) French Republic (from 1792) Spain (from 1796) Batavian Republic (from 1795) (Kingdom of Italy (Napoleonic)) Sister republics Polish Legions (from 1797)	Defeat: Peace of Basel; Peace of Campo Formio
December 1798 – 25 March 1802	War of the Second Coalition	Holy Roman Empire: Habsburg Monarchy; Hungary; Great Britain (until 1801); United Kingdom (from 1801); Russia (until 1799); Portugal; Naples; Grand Duchy of Tuscany (Sovereign Military Order of Malta) Order of Saint John (1798); Ottoman Empire (Kingdom of France) French Royalists	France; Spain; Polish Legions; Batavian Republic Helvetic Republic (Kingdom of Italy (Napoleonic)) Cisalpine Republic (Kingdom of Italy (Napoleonic)) Roman Republic (until 1799)	Defeat: Treaty of Lunéville
April 1805 – 21 July 1806	War of the Third Coalition	Holy Roman Empire: Austria; Hungary; Russian Empire; United Kingdom; Kingdom of Naples (Kingdom of the Two Sicilies) Kingdom of Sicily; Sweden	France: Spain; Electorate of Bavaria; Napoleonic Italy; Batavian Republic; Württemberg; (Kingdom of Italy (Napoleonic)) Etruria	Defeat: Treaty of Pressburg; Consolidation of the French Empire; Creation of the Confederation of the Rhine; Dissolution of the Holy Roman Empire; Formation of the Fourth Coalition a few months later
10 April – 14 October 1809	War of the Fifth Coalition Napoleon at the Battle of Wagram, 1809	Austria Hungary Tyrol (Note: In rebellion against Bavaria) United Kingdom Spain (Kingdom of the Two Sicilies) Sicily Sardinia Black Brunswickers	France Confederation of the Rhine: Bavaria; Saxony; Württemberg; Westphalia; Italy Polish Legions Naples Switzerland (Netherlands) Holland	Defeat: Treaty of Schönbrunn
24 June – 14 December 1812	French invasion of Russia	France Duchy of Warsaw (Kingdom of Italy (Napoleonic)) Kingdom of Italy Naples Confederation of the Rhine: Baden; Bavaria; Berg; Saxony; Westphalia; (Switzerland) Swiss Confederation Napoleonic Spain Austria; Prussia; Denmark–Norway	Russian Empire	The Habsburg Monarchy joins the Coalition: Beginning of the War of the Sixth Coalition
3 March 1813 – 30 May 1814	War of the Sixth Coalition Battle of Leipzig	Austria; Prussia United Kingdom; Sweden; Russia; Spain; Portugal (Kingdom of the Two Sicilies) Sicily; Sardinia	France Napoleonic Italy Kingdom of Naples Duchy of Warsaw	Victory: Treaty of Paris; Treaty of Fontainebleau; Bourbon Restoration, exile of Napoleon Bonaparte; Congress of Vienna
20 March – 8 July 1815	War of the Seventh Coalition	Austria; Prussia; United Kingdom; Russia (Province of Hanover) Hanover Nassau; Brunswick; Sweden; United Netherlands; Spain; Portugal; Sardinia (Kingdom of the Two Sicilies) Sicily; Tuscany; Switzerland (Kingdom of France) French Royalists	France (Kingdom of the Two Sicilies) Naples	Victory: Treaty of Paris
July – August 1831	Cholera Riots	Hungarian peasants	Austrian Empire	Defeat
15 March 1848 – 4 October 1849	Hungarian Revolution and War of Independence of 1848–1849: Serb uprising; Slovak revolt; Autumn Campaign; Winter Campaign; Spring Campaign; Summer Campaign; Artist Mihály Zichy's painting of Sándor Petőfi recites the National Poem to a crowd on 15 March 1848.	Kingdom of Hungary (1848–49) Hungarian State (1849) Allied peoples and legions	Austrian Empire Russian Empire Allied peoples and legions	Defeat: Revolution suppressed by Austrian, Russian, and allied forces; Reincorporation of Hungary into the Austrian Empire
29 April – 11 July 1859	Second Italian War of Independence Napoleon III at the Battle of Solferino, 1859	Austrian Empire; Habsburg Tuscany	France Sardinia supported by United Provinces of Central Italy	Defeat: Sardinia annexed Lombardy from Austria; Sardinia occupied and later annexed Habsburg-ruled Tuscany and Emilia; France gains Savoy and Nice from Sardinia
14 June – 26 July 1866	Austro-Prussian War Battle of Königgrätz, by Georg Bleibtreu. Oil on canvas, 1869.	Austrian Empire and allied German states	Prussia and allied German states Italy	Defeat: Prussia annexes parts of Bavaria, Hanover, Hesse-Kassel, parts of Hesse-Darmstadt, Holstein, Schleswig, Nassau, and Frankfurt; Italy annexes Venetia and part of Friuli; Dissolution of the German Confederation; Formation of the North German Confederation; Exclusion of Austria from Germany; Formation of Austria-Hungary
October 1869 – 11 January 1870	Krivošije Uprising	Austria-Hungary	Krivošije rebels	Stalemate: Most rebel demands met
29 July – 20 October 1878	Occupation of Bosnia	Austria-Hungary	Bosnia Vilayet tacit support Ottoman Empire	Victory: Bosnia placed under Austro-Hungarian occupation as a condominium; Pacification of local resistance
2 November 1899 – 7 September 1901	Boxer Rebellion The Siege of the International Legations in Peking, 1900	Eight-Nation Alliance United Kingdom Japan Russia France Germany United States Austria-Hungary Italy	China Yihetuan	Victory: Boxer Protocol signed

== Wars in the 20th century ==
Conflict		Belligerents		Result
Date	Name	Allies	Enemies	Outcome
28 July 1914 – 11 November 1918	World War I Austro-Hungarian mountain corps in Tyrol	Central Powers; Austria-Hungary; German Empire; Ottoman Empire; Bulgaria	Allied Powers; France; British Empire; Russian Empire (1914–17) Kingdom of Serbia; Kingdom of Montenegro; Belgium; Japan; Italy (from 1915); Portugal (from 1916); Romania (from 1916); Greece (from 1917) (Thailand) Siam (from 1917) Co-belligerents; Hejaz (from 1916); United States (from 1917); Brazil (from 1917)	Defeat: Collapse of the Austro-Hungarian Empire and creation of the First Hungarian Republic; Beginning of Revolutions and interventions in Hungary (1918–1920); Treaty of Trianon; Loss of two-thirds of pre-war Hungarian territory
December 1918 – June 1919	Hungarian–Czechoslovak War Hungarian Red Army in Kassa, 1919.	First Hungarian Republic Hungarian Soviet Republic Slovak Soviet Republic	Czechoslovakia	Military Victory Political Defeat: Hungarian advance into Czechoslovakia, then withdraw after negotiations; Creation and dissolution of the Slovak Soviet Republic
13 November 1918 – 3 August 1919	Hungarian–Romanian War Romanian cavalry march through Budapest, 1919.	Hungarian Soviet Republic	Romania	Defeat: Collapse of the Hungarian Soviet Republic; Romanian occupation of Hungary proceeds
2–6 June 1919	Hungarian invasion of Prekmurje	Hungarian Soviet Republic	Republic of Prekmurje	Victory: Soviet rule restored in Prekmurje
3 August – 13 October 1921	Uprising in West Hungary Hungarian Freecorps in Burgenland, 1921.	Austria; Hungary (disarmament of the rebels in 1921)	Rongyos Gárda; Lajtabánság; Bosnian and Albanian Muslim volunteers	Victory: Referendum called; Sopron and its area remained in Hungary
20 - 23 October 1921	Charles IV's second coup attempt Charles IV and Queen Zita in Sopron during the March on Budapest.	Hungary	Habsburg Royalists	Victory: Coup fails; Habsburgs dethroned
15 – 18 March 1939	Hungarian invasion of Carpatho-Ukraine Hungarian gendarme stands in front of a LT-35 tank destroyed near Fanchykovo.	Hungary	Carpatho-Ukraine	Victory: Occupation and annexation of Carpatho-Ukraine
23 – 31 March 1939	Slovak-Hungarian War Hungarian and Slovak servicemen – gendarmes, soldiers, Hlinka Guard, 1939.	Hungary	Slovakia	Victory: Annexation of a border strip between eastern Slovakia and Carpathian Ruthenia
1 September 1939 – 2 September 1945 Hungary entered: 27 June 1941 Hungary exited: 11 May 1945	World War II Hungarian Arrow Cross militia and a German Tiger II tank in Budapest, October 1944 Hungarian Toldi I tank used during the 1941 invasion of the Soviet Union	Axis powers (Nazi Germany) Germany; Italy (1940–43); Empire of Japan Affiliate states Romania (1941–44); Hungary (from 1941); Bulgaria (1941–44); Thailand (1942–45) Client States Slovakia; Croatia Government of National Salvation Manchukuo; Mengjiang; Albania Co-belligerents Finland (1941–44) Iraq (1941) Vichy France (1940–44) Active neutrality Soviet Union (1939–41) Spain (1941–44) Argentina (1939–44	Allied Powers; Soviet Union (from June 1941); United States (from December 1941); United Kingdom; China; France (1939–40, 1944–45) In exile for part of the war Poland; Norway; Netherlands; Belgium; Free France (1940–44); Luxembourg; Greece; Czechoslovakia Other important belligerents Canada; India; Australia; New Zealand; South Africa; Yugoslavia; Ethiopia; Brazil; Mexico; Colombia; Cuba; Philippines; Mongolia Co-belligerents Italy (1943–1945) Romania (1944–1945); Finland (1944–1945); Bulgaria (1944–1945)	Defeat: Soviet occupation of Hungary; Paris Peace Treaties, 1947; First Vienna Award annulled (Czechoslovakia re-gained some of the territories lost to Hungary in 1938); Second Vienna Award annulled (Romania re-gained of Northern Transylvania, lost to Hungary in 1940); Hungarian withdrawal and loss of annexed territories to Yugoslavia; Soviet annexation of Carpathian Ruthenia (fully became part of again Hungary in 1939); Sovietization of Hungary; installation of a communist puppet regime
23 October – 10 November 1956	Hungarian Revolution of 1956 The flag, with a hole where the communist coat of arms had been cut out, became the symbol of the revolution.	Hungarian revolutionaries	Soviet Union (Hungarian People's Republic) People's Republic of Hungary	Defeat: Revolution crushed by Soviet troops; Re-imposition of Soviet-backed puppet regime until 1989; Soviet military presence in Hungary until 1991
20 – 21 August 1968	Warsaw Pact invasion of Czechoslovakia Soviet tanks with invasion stripes in Czechoslovakia, 1968	Warsaw Pact; Soviet Union; Bulgaria; Poland (Hungary) Hungary supported by East Germany	Czechoslovakia	Victory: Prague Spring crushed; Moscow Protocol; Soviet military presence in Czechoslovakia until 1991

== Wars in the 21st century ==
Conflict		Belligerents		Result	
Date	Name	Allies	Enemies	Outcome	Losses
March 2003 – 2009	Iraq War	MNF–I: United States; United Kingdom; Australia (2003–2009); Poland (2003–2008); Albania (2004–2008); Armenia (2005–2008); Azerbaijan (2004–2008); Bosnia and Herzegovina (2005–2008); Bulgaria (2004–2008); Czech Republic (2004–2008); Denmark (2004–2007); Dominican Republic (2004–2004); El Salvador(2004–2009); Estonia (2005–2009); Georgia (2004–2008); Honduras (2004–2004); Hungary (2004–2005); Iceland (2004-Unknown); Italy (2004–2006); Japan (2004–2008); Kazakhstan (2004–2008); Latvia (2004–2008); Lithuania (2004–2007); Republic of Macedonia (2004–2008); Moldova (2004–2008); Mongolia (2004–2008); Netherlands (2004–2005); New Zealand (2004–2004); Nicaragua (2004–2004); Norway (2004–2006); Philippines (2004–2004); Portugal (2004–2005); Romania(2004–2009); Singapore (2004–2008); Slovakia (2004–2007); South Korea (2004–2008); Spain (2004–2004); Thailand (2004–2004); Tonga (2004–2008); Ukraine (2004–2008); Iraqi National Congress; New Iraqi government: Iraqi Armed Forces; Awakening Council; Iraqi Kurdistan: Peshmerga	Ba'athist Iraq; Ansar al-Islam Supreme Command for Jihad and Liberation; Army of the Men of the Naqshbandi Order Sunni insurgents: Islamic State of Iraq; Islamic Army of Iraq; Ansar al-Sunnah; Shia insurgents: Mahdi Army; Special Groups; Asa'ib Ahl al-Haq; Others; For fighting between insurgent groups, see Civil war in Iraq (2006–07).	Victory: Invasion and occupation of Iraq; Overthrow of Ba'ath Party government and execution of Saddam Hussein; Iraqi insurgency, emergence of al-Qaeda in Iraq, and civil war; Subsequent depletion of al-Qaeda in Iraq, improvements in public security, Iraqi insurgency persists; Establishment of democratic elections and formation of new Shia led government; U.S.–Iraq Status of Forces Agreement; Escalation of sectarian insurgency after U.S. withdrawal and spillover with the Syrian Civil War; Resurgence of Islamic State of Iraq, the successor of al-Qaeda in Iraq,	1 soldier killed 12 wounded.
7 October 2001 – 30 August 2021	War in Afghanistan	ISAF; RS	Taliban; Al-Qaeda	Taliban Victory / US-allied defeat: United States invasion of Afghanistan (2001); Destruction of al-Qaeda and Taliban militant training camps (2001); Fall of the Taliban government (2001) and Establishment of the Islamic Republic of Afghanistan; Start of Taliban insurgency; Osama bin Laden killed by DEVGRU operators in Abbottabad, Pakistan in May 2011; "Afghanization" of Afghan conflict. Withdrawal of most US troops by 2014; End of Operation Enduring Freedom; start of 2015 phase of war, and Operation Freedom's Sentinel. End of US and ISAF led combat mission; beginning of NATO-led training and assistance mission.; Doha Agreement and progressive withdrawal of remaining US troops after 2020; Renewed Taliban offensive in 2021; Taliban forces capture Kabul on 15 August 2021 and overthrow the U.S.-backed Islamic Republic of Afghanistan; Re-establishment of the Taliban-run Islamic Emirate of Afghanistan; Panjshir Province held out against the Taliban for 3 weeks after Kabul was conquered but ended up also being conquered by the Taliban	7 soldiers killed 14 wounded.

== See also ==
- Military history of Hungary

== Sources ==
- Babinger, Franz (1978). Mehmed the Conqueror and His Time. Princeton University Press. ISBN 0-691-09900-6.
- Bánlaky, József (1928). A magyar nemzet hadtörténelme [The Military History of the Hungarian Nation] (in Hungarian). Budapest.
- Barta, Gábor; Granasztói, György (1981). "A három részre szakadt ország és a török kiűzése (1526–1605)". In Benda, Kálmán; Péter, Katalin (eds.). Magyarország történeti kronológiája, II: 1526–1848 [Historical Chronology of Hungary, Volume I: 1526–1848] (in Hungarian). Akadémiai Kiadó. pp. 361–430. ISBN 963-05-2662-X.
- Bowlus, Charles R. (2016). The Battle of Lechfeld and its Aftermath, August 955: The End of the Age of Migrations in the Latin West. London: Routledge. doi:10.4324/9781315241142. ISBN 978-1-351-89417-3. OCLC 965444179. Partial previews are at the 2016 edition at Google Books and the 2006 edition at Google Books.
- Engel, Pál (2001). The Realm of St Stephen: A History of Medieval Hungary, 895–1526. I.B. Tauris Publishers. ISBN 1-86064-061-3.
- Fine, John V. A. (1994). The Late Medieval Balkans: A Critical Survey from the Late Twelfth Century to the Ottoman Conquest. The University of Michigan Press. ISBN 0-472-08260-4.
  - (Appendix) Kokkonen, Andrej; Sundell, Anders (September 2017). Online supplementary appendix for "The King is Dead: Political Succession and War in Europe, 1000–1799" (PDF). Gothenburg: University of Gothenburg. p. 40.
- Jefferson, John (2012). The Holy Wars of King Wladislas and Sultan Murad: The Ottoman-Christian Conflict from 1438–1444. Leiden: Brill Publishers. ISBN 978-90-04-21904-5.
- Kings and Saints - The Age of the Árpáds (PDF). Budapest, Székesfehérvár: Institute of Hungarian Research. 2022. ISBN 978-615-6117-65-6.
- Kristó, Gyula; Makk, Ferenc (1996). Az Árpád-ház uralkodói (in Hungarian). I.P.C. Könyvek. ISBN 978-963-7930-97-3.
- Madgearu, Alexandru (2017). The Asanids: The Political and Military History of the Second Bulgarian Empire, 1185–1280. BRILL. ISBN 978-9-004-32501-2.
- Magyar Tudományos Akadémia (1987). Magyarország története - Előzmények és magyar történet 1242-ig I-II. Akadémiai Kiadó. ISBN 9789630515184.
- Mureşanu, Camil (2001). John Hunyadi: Defender of Christendom. The Center for Romanian Studies. ISBN 973-9432-18-2.
- Nagy, Kálmán (2007). A honfoglalás korának hadtörténete [Military History of the Age of the Hungarian Conquest] (in Hungarian). Budapest: Heraldika Kiadó.
- Pop, Ioan-Aurel (2005). "Romanians in the 14th–16th Centuries: From the "Christian Republic" to the "Restoration of Dacia"". In Pop, Ioan-Aurel; Bolovan, Ioan (eds.). History of Romania: Compendium. Romanian Cultural Institute (Center for Transylvanian Studies). pp. 209–314. ISBN 978-973-7784-12-4.
- Teke, Zsuzsa (1980). Hunyadi János és kora [John Hunyadi and his Times] (in Hungarian). Gondolat. ISBN 963-280-951-3.
