= Siege of Pécs (1664) =

- Part of Austro-Turkish War (1663–1664)
- The siege of Pécs in 1664
| Date | 28 January – 6 February 1664 |
| Location | Pécs |
| Result | Ottoman victory |

Belligerents
| Holy Roman Empire; Kingdom of Hungary; Kingdom of Croatia | Ottoman Empire |

Commanders and leaders
| Miklós Zrínyi (Holy Roman Empire) Hohenlohe-Neuenstein | Kaplan Pasha |

Strength
| 26,000 men | 2,500 |

Casualties and losses
| Unknown | Unknown |

The siege of Pécs in 1664 was launched by the Habsburgs against the Ottoman fortress of Pécs during the winter campaign. Despite initial success, they failed to capture the citadel, which was held by the garrison, and withdrew.

== Background ==
In 1663, the Croatian Hungarian general Miklós Zrínyi, launched a campaign against the Ottomans in the winter. He set the date for January 1664, when it was the coldest month in which the Ottomans would remain in their castles. The goal of this campaign was to destroy the 8-kilometer Ottoman bridge in Osijek and cut off the supply lines of the Ottomans, which would force them to rebuild it while the Habsburgs set out to capture Nagykanizsa.

The Habsburgs had an army of 26,000, consisting of 8,000 Hungarians, 5,000 Croatians, and 13,000 Germans. They first captured Berzence and Babócsa and attacked the tomb of Suleiman the Magnificent near Szigetvár and destroyed it, but Zrínyi prevented his men from exhuming Sulieman's dead body. The Ottoman garrison of Szigetvár could only skirmish with the Christians. They then marched towards Pécs and arrived there on 28 January. It was a populace city, containing 6–7,000 houses and 16 mosques, and its cathedral was converted into a citadel. The garrison was led by Kaplan Pasha.

== Siege ==
The Christians attacked the suburbs on the same day, and the Ottomans made a sally to confront them but were repelled, and the next day they launched an assault on the city. The Ottomans made fierce resistance before retreating behind the walls to the citadel. They assaulted the walls and began sacking the city, during which considerable spoils were looted. However, despite this, the troops began drinking, and there were hardly less than 1,000 men besieging the citadel. During the night, they managed to recollect their forces and launch an assault; however, it was easily repelled by the garrison.

They began bombing the castle on 30 January, but with little effect. Zrínyi decided to leave the city and head out to destroy the targeted bridge, leaving his commander, Hohenlohe-Neuenstein, to continue the siege. Zrínyi took 5,000 cavalry of the combined armies and left the infantrymen. Zrínyi managed to destroy the targeted bridge on February 2. Zrínyi returned to Pécs on February 5, but he was disappointed that they hadn't captured the citadel yet. The soldiers attempted to explain this by stating that they went drunk and suffered heavy losses to the Ottoman rifles.

Due to a lack of artillery, Zrínyi did not continue the siege, although Hohenlohe argued very strongly for the continuation of the siege. The combined army left the city on 6 February.

== Aftermath ==
Thus ended the winter campaign of 1664, which was well received in Europe. Zrínyi reputation increased. He managed to accomplish his new objective, which was to lay siege to Kanizsa, but the Vienna generals only permitted him to do so until spring. His entire advantage was destroyed by this choice, as the Ottomans had repaired the bridge by then and sent their main army to reinforce Kanizsa.
