= Battle of Ilava =

1431 battle of the Hussite Wars

- Part of the Hussite Wars
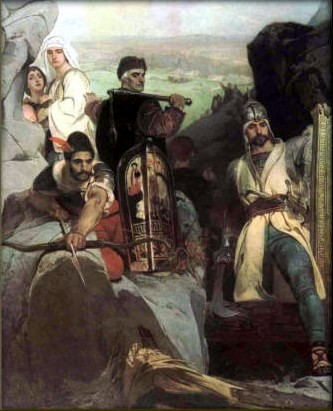
- Hussites defending the pass by Jaroslav Čermák
Date	November 9, 1431
Location	Ilava (Illava) and Hlohovec (Galgóc), Kingdom of Hungary (today Slovakia)
Result	Hungarian-Royalists victory

Belligerents
Kingdom of Hungary; Moravian Catholic nobility Bohemian Catholic nobility	Orphans

Commanders and leaders
Miklós Rozgonyi; István Pohárnok	Jan Čapek of Sány; Prokop the Lesser

Strength
Unknown	7,000 with 300 war wagons

Casualties and losses
Unknown	5,000, 250 war wagons

The Battle of Ilava (called also Battle of Rudé Pole, Slovak: Bitka na Rudom poli) took place during the Hussite Wars between the Hussites and the Hungarian-Royalists army near Ilava in Upper Hungary (Slovakia) on November 9, 1431 (sometimes date of November 10th or 11th is given).

In 1430 the army of the Hussites defeated the army of the Hungarians, Serbs and Royalists in the Battle of Trnava, but the casualties of the Hussites were quite big, making the victory not as successful.

In September of 1431 the Hussite army under Prokop the Great, Prokop the Lesser (Prokůpek) and Hanuš of Kolovrat again invaded present day Slovakia (also known as Upper Hungary) for the revenge of the death of Velek Koudelník of Březnice and for food replenishment. The Hussites captured city of Nitra and the Orebite forces conquered the Likava castle in Liptov county, on 29 September. The Taborite forces were looting settlements around cities of Trnava, Nitra and Levice.

Later, seeking to return home, Hussites were following river Váh to the north, hoping to cross the bridge at Hlohovec. They found the bridge destroyed and were forced to march on towards Ilava, where the Hungarians under the leadership of Miklós Rozgoyni (Mikuláš Rozgoň) and István Poharnok (Štefan Pohárnik) prepared a trap. The battle was fought on a field (Rudé pole, lit. red field) between Ilava and settlement of Košeca. Thanks to the intensive rain, the Hussites were not able to properly manoeuver and about 5,000 of them were killed or drowned trying to cross Váh. Around 250 Hussite war wagons and many cannons were captured. Rozgonyi executed many Taborite prisoners and their commander Zikmund Hořovský. Remains of the Hussite army retreated through the valley of Púchov back into Moravia.

== Sources ==
- Illavai ütközet (Magyar katolikus lexikon)
- Sirotčí výpravy na Slovensko
- Na Považí sa odohrá krvavá bitka - Cestovný ruch, Cestovanie - Pravda
