= Battle of Trnava (1430) =

1430 battle of the Hussite Wars

Coordinates: 48°24′N 17°42′E

- Part of the Hussite Wars
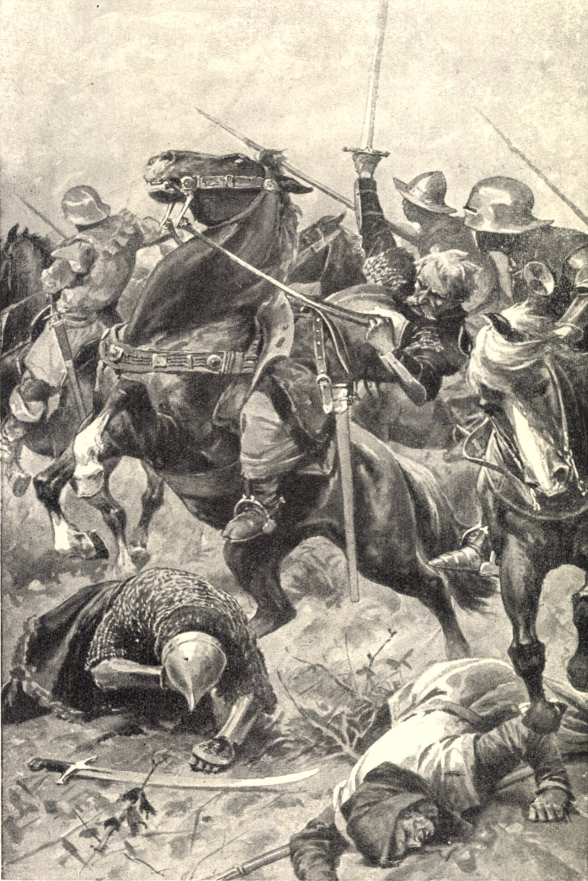
- Death of Velek Koudelník of Březnice in the Battle of Trnava
Date	23–28 April 1430
Location	Trnava (Nagyszombat), Kingdom of Hungary (today: Slovakia)
Result	Hussite victory

Belligerents
Holy Roman Empire: Bohemian Catholic nobility; Margraviate of Moravia; Kingdom of Hungary; Serbian Despotate	Hussite coalition: Orphans; Taborites; New Town units

Commanders and leaders
Emperor Sigismund; Stibor II of Stiboricz; John of Maroth	Velek Koudelník of Březnice †; Prokop the Lesser

Strength
10,000–12,000	10,000

Casualties and losses
6,000	8,000

The Battle of Trnava or Battle of Nagyszombat took place during the Hussite Wars between the Hussites and the Hungarian-Royalists-Serbian army near Trnava (Nagyszombat) in the Kingdom of Hungary (today in Slovakia). The battle was fought in three phases, on 23, 25 and 28 April 1430 and ended in Hussite victory.

In the summer of 1430, 10,000 Hussites from Moravia invaded Hungary under Velek Koudelník of Březnice. The Hussites in Pozsony County looted and set on fire 100 villages. Against Koudelník stood an army under Sigismund, and Stibor of Stiboricz. The army included Hungarian and Transylvanian soldiers and Serbs. Another army under Jan Mátik z Tolovec was composed of Royalists. Mátik was jealous of Stiboricz, because of the trust placed in Stiboricz by Sigismund. At the front of the army, Stiboricz and the Hungarian-Serbian forces charged the Hussites, but Mátik and the Royalists deliberately hung back. The Royalists army belatedly arrived; the plan of campaign was a concentrated charge against the Hussite war-wagons. Koudelník was killed in the battle, and Sigismund's army was forced to flee. Hussites retreated to the Moravian border that night.

In the battle, 6,000 Royalists, Serbian and Hungarian troops, and 8,000 Hussites were killed. In 1431 the Hussite army again invaded Upper Hungary, but Miklós Rozgonyi defeated the Hussites in the battle of Ilava.

== Sources ==
- Lysý, Miroslav (2007). "Husitské vpády do Uhorska 1428 – 1431" [The Hussite Raids into the Kingdom of Hungary in 1428 – 1431]. Historický časopis (in Slovak) (3).
- Segeš, Vladimír; Šeďová, Božena, eds. (2013). Pramene k vojenským dejinám slovenska I/3 1387 – 1526 [The Sources to the Military History of Slovakia] (PDF) (in Slovak). Bratislava: Vojenský historický ústav.
- Varsík, Branislav (1965). Husitske revolučné hnutie a Slovensko [The Hussite revolution movement and Slovakia] (in Slovak). Bratislava: Vydavateľstvo Slovenskej akadémie vied.
- A Nagyszombati csata (Magyar Katolikus Lexikon)
