= Siege of Esztergom (1242) =

Siege during the Mongol invasion of Hungary

- Part of First Mongol invasion of Hungary
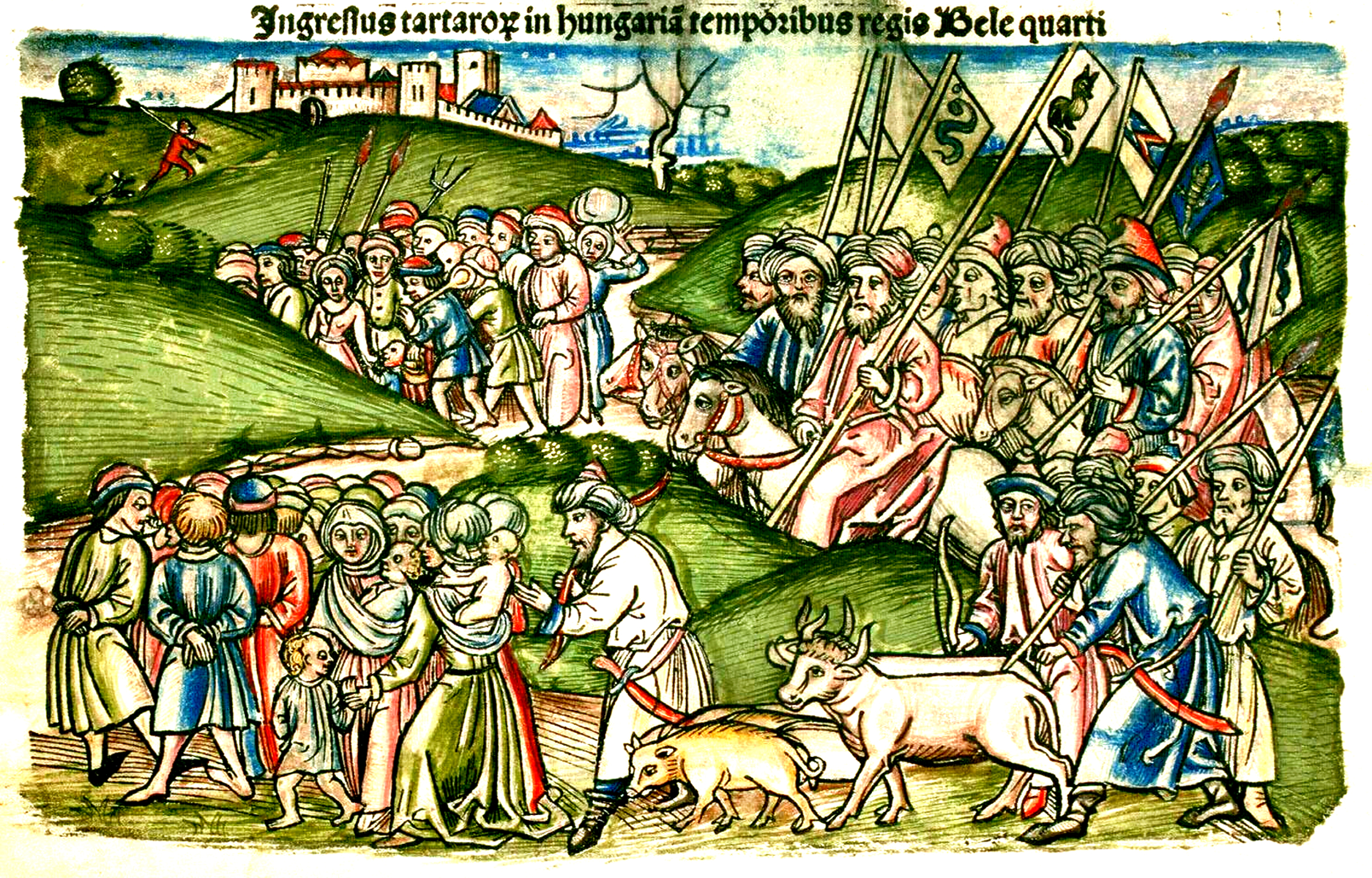
- Mongol invasion in the plains of Hungary
Date	January 1242
Location	Esztergom, Hungary 47°47′8″N 18°44′25″E
Result	Hungarian victory: City devasted, but blocked Mongols

Belligerents
Mongol Empire	Kingdom of Hungary

Commanders and leaders
Batu Khan	Count Simon

Units involved
Dismounted heavy cavalry; Dismounted horse archers; 30 catapults	Crossbowmen; Small contingent of knights

Casualties and losses
Significant losses	300 nobles killed; substantial civilian casualties

The siege of Esztergom took place in the winter of early 1242. Following the hard-fought but decisive Mongol victory at the Battle of Mohi, Batu Khan pillaged the lands of the Kingdom of Hungary, with particular focus on soft targets such as small villages and towns. One exception was Esztergom, the capital and largest, wealthiest city in the Kingdom of Hungary until its destruction. It was the last city to be looted and destroyed by Batu Khan before he sent a reconnaissance party against the Holy Roman Empire and later withdrew all of the Mongol forces from central Europe back to Russia. Most of the information on the siege and its aftermath comes from the chronicle of Roger of Torre Maggiore, the Italian (Apulian) archbishop of Split.

== Background ==
Following the Mongol conquest of the Kievan Rus states, the Cumans fled from their former lands and appealed to King Béla IV of Hungary for refuge, which he accepted on the condition they provide him military service. Batu Khan immediately threatened the king to round up all the Cumans or be annihilated. King Béla IV refused, and his kingdom was subsequently invaded. Béla was unable to secure military support from any other European states, bar Moravia, Bohemia, and the Polish duchies, which the Mongols dealt with separately.

Béla's kingdom was ill-prepared for the Mongol invasion. At the time, Hungary was one of the poorest and most sparsely populated areas of Europe. The population was estimated at slightly over 2 million in the mid-thirteenth century despite its large land area, with the largest city, Esztergom, having only 12,000 inhabitants. Its armies consisted primarily of light cavalry with some light infantry, and only a handful of crossbowmen, mounted knights, and heavy infantry, in contrast to the areas further west where such troops were nearly ubiquitous. The focus on light cavalry made Béla's army appear "oriental" to Western observers. Most critically, Hungary had an almost complete lack of stone fortifications, with less than a dozen stone castles; even the nobles mostly relied on wood and earth forts.

The Mongols were very successful in their initial advance. After sacking Buda, they won a large victory over Béla at the Battle of Mohi, which effectively wiped out most of Hungary's army in a day. After this they proceeded to lay waste to most of Hungary's unfortified places, with particular devastation inflicted on the plains regions, where 50-80% of settlements were destroyed. The Mongols also searched stringently for King Béla. In early 1242, they crossed the frozen Danube river, hoping to pillage the richest territories of the kingdom of Hungary.

== Battle ==
Batu Khan decided to assault the city in January 1242. His troops battered the walls of Esztergom with catapults and stone throwers. They easily reduced the walls and wooden towers, and had prisoners fill the moat with earth. Rogerius states that when the Hungarians and foreigners in the city realized it was going to fall, they torched their houses along with huge amounts of dyed fabrics and any other valuable commodities. They also slaughtered the animals and buried their gold and silver, or sent it to the citadel, the only fully stone fortification in the city.

Many citizens also fled to the citadel. While the rest of the city was sacked, the citadel held, with the garrison commanded by the Aragonese knight Simon (also spelled "Simeone"), an ispán of Spanish origin. Batu ordered his engineers to batter down the walls of the citadel, hoping to get at the valuables inside, but the catapults failed to do sufficient damage, forcing him to attempt to storm the citadel. The Mongols were beaten back time after time, with Rogerius noting the effectiveness of the garrison's crossbowmen in inflicting enormous damage on the Mongol force (the exact term Rogerius used, "balistarii", was used in most contemporary sources to refer to crossbowmen; despite some confusion, he and other contemporary chroniclers usually referred to siege engines such as ballistas as "machina"). After heavy casualties, Batu accepted defeat and broke off the siege.

== Aftermath ==
The Mongols never stayed long enough to stage an effective siege on any of the Hungarian fortification unlike the wars with the Jin dynasty and Samarkand that took more than 3 to 12 months of siege. Batu was enraged by the result of the siege. Any valuable plunder he could have taken in exchange for his significant losses was either destroyed or sent to the citadel, which held all the city's remaining wealth in the "high upper castle." In his anger, Batu slaughtered the hostages he had taken during the sack of the city itself, including 300 noblewomen and any civilians he could find. Rogerius states that only 15 civilians survived the sacking, though modern historians find that claim doubtful, believing many more should have been inside the citadel.

Attempts by other Mongol forces to assault other Hungarian stone fortifications met with similarly dismal results, despite their success in pillaging the rest of the country before their withdrawal. Székesfehérvár and the Pannonhalma Archabbey held, as did the fortress of Klis, where the defenders launched boulders down the hillside onto the Mongols who were crawling toward the citadel after the Mongol stone-throwers again failed to reduce the walls or did not bother. While small in scope, the siege of Esztergom proved an immensely influential event for King Béla IV, who interpreted the engagement as a ringing endorsement of stone fortifications, crossbowmen, and a defensive, scorched earth strategy in the face of Mongol invasions. He would reform his country's military doctrine immensely during the remainder of his rule, and his successor put these lessons into practice when the Mongols returned in 1285.

The Mongols had set their sights on the gates of Vienna and raided as far in Wiener Neustadt and Korneuburg. But then they withdrew from the region. The traditional explanation for this is that the Mongols received news of the death of Ögedei Khan and this halted the Mongol advance so that all Mongol leaders in Europe could return to Mongolia and participate in the kurultai that would elect a new Khan. But this explanation has been challenged because the kurultai wasn't actually held until a year later and a new khan wasn't elected until 1246. Moreover, Batu Khan, who led the European invasion, refused to return to Mongolia. A more recent explanation is that because of the existence of a number of stone fortifications, and the willingness of the populace to flee rather than be enslaved, the Mongols were only able to devastate Hungary, not subjugate it. Béla never surrendered or agreed to pay tribute, and Batu's forces suffered casualties too heavy to sustain, so the Mongols simply withdrew. Nonetheless, they had inflicted considerable damage on the kingdom of Hungary, with 300,000 to 500,000 people dying either during the invasion or as a result of the ensuing famine (15-25% of the population).
