= Winter Campaign of Austro-Turkish War (1663–1664) =

- Part of Austro-Turkish War (1663–1664)
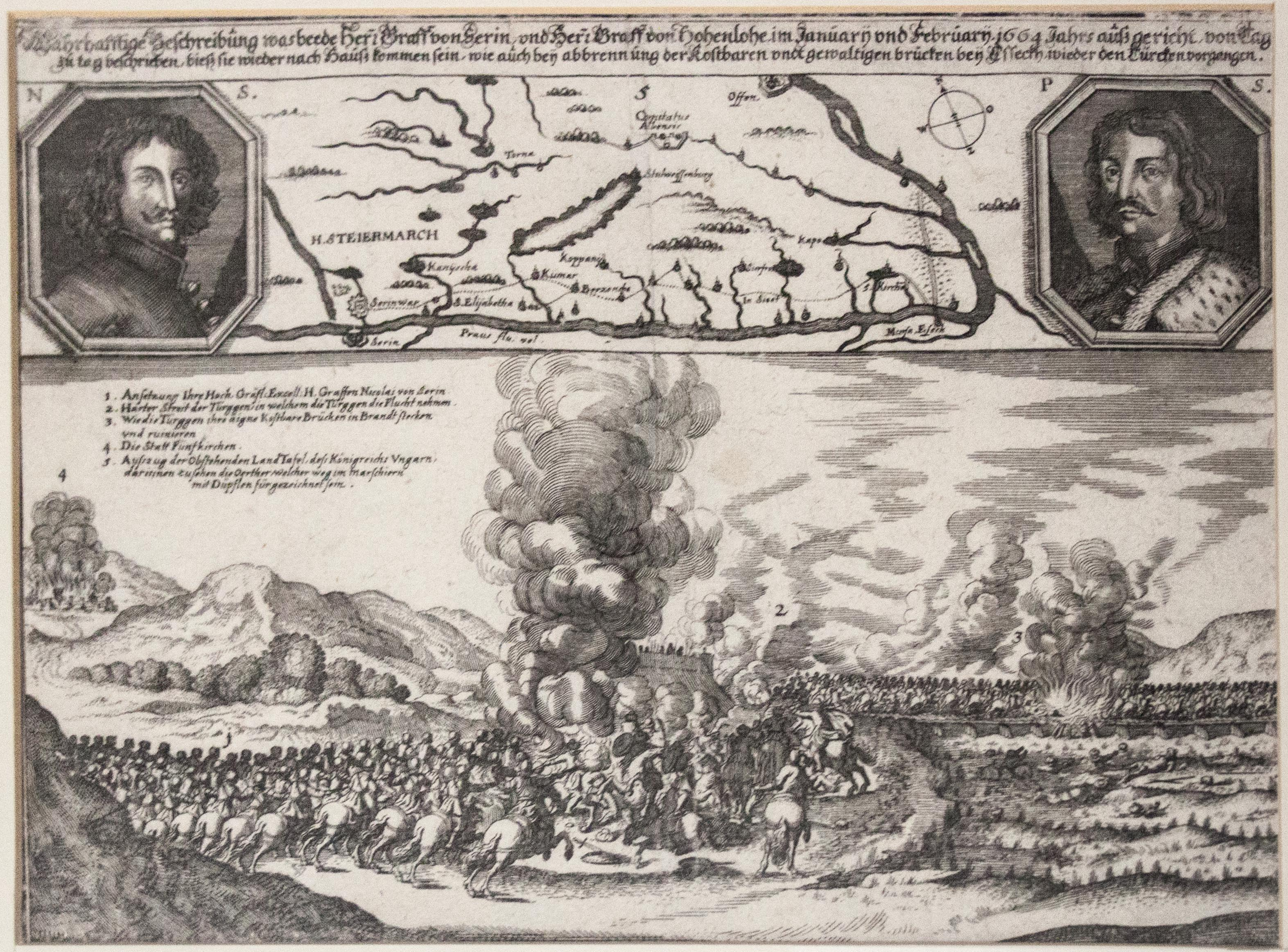
- Miklós and Péter Zrínyi, burning of the bridge at Eszék
Date	January 21 – February 15, 1664
Location	Kingdom of Hungary, in the counties of Somogy and Baranya, along the Dráva
Result	Christian Coalition tactical victory

Belligerents
Habsburg Monarchy: Kingdom of Hungary; Kingdom of Croatia	Ottoman Empire

Commanders and leaders
Nikola VII Zrinski (Miklós Zrínyi) (Holy Roman Empire) Hohenlohe-Neuenstein	Köprülü Ahmed Pasha

Strength
Croatian-Hungarian troops: 15,000; Troops of the League of the Rhine: 7,300	Unknown, small

Casualties and losses
Unknown	Unknown

The Winter Campaign, also known as the Osijek campaign (Hungarian: Eszék kampány; Croatian: Zimska vojna Nikole VI Zrinskog), was the campaign of Nikola VII Zrinski (Hungarian: Zrínyi Miklós), Ban of Croatia, in the winter of 1664, during which he and his army penetrated 240 km into Turkish territory. Between 1663 and 1664. This campaign most important operation of the Turkish Campaign in 1664, which was also the main success of the Christian forces. The history of the campaign is that in 1663 the Turks attacked Hungary with an army of almost 80,000 people. The king appointed Zrinski as the commander-in-chief of the Croato-Hungarian troops, who, with his successful enterprise, set fire to the Osijek bridge that provided supplies to the Turkish garrisons across the Danube, but due to the court's delay, he was unable to capitalize on the victory. Kanizsa Bécs, who saw a political opponent in Zrinski, who fought with pen and sword, replaced him after a siege that ended in failure.

== Background ==
To Transylvania II. Due to the reckless campaign in Poland launched by George II Rákóczi, huge Turkish and Tatar armies were defeated. Rákóczi did not want to abdicate his throne, so he armed himself against the sultan, asking for help from the Austrian emperor Lipót I and the Hungarian king. Leopold was forced by the Rhine Alliance established by the North German princes and the Electoral Principality of Mainz, but the emperor only made apparent measures to be elected Leopold I, and after this happened, he did not intervene in the war raging in Transylvania.

The Viennese court remained passive even after the fall of the key castle, and this upset not only the Hungarian orders, but also the whole of Europe. The Croatian Nikola VII Zrinski (Miklós Zrínyi) surrounded the castle of Kanizsa, captured by Turks in 1600, at the beginning of the siege, but the Court ordered him to stop. In 1661, he built Novi Zrin, a castle at the Mura River in Međimurje, a small region in the northernmost part of Croatia, with help of a military engineer from the Netherlands. This caused a fierce protest at the Turkish port, and was also banned by the Court War Council. The Turks threatened war, which the Habsburgs definitely wanted to avoid: on the one hand, because they considered the French threat from the west to be more serious, and on the other hand, because they could not field an adequate military force.

Meanwhile, the new prince of Transylvania, John Kemény, continued the fight against the Turks, and he also asked for the help of the Habsburgs. The court, on the other hand, secretly agreed with the Turks: among the promises was the destruction of Novi Zrin, for which the Turks would install a new prince on the throne of Transylvania, so that the old status of the country would be preserved. The Turks finally made Mihály Apafi their prince, and the Austrians left Kemény alone.

But the court could not avoid the war because it hesitated and did not make peace with the Sultan after the defeat of János Kemény. Because of this, the Turks declared war in 1663.

The imperial and Hungarian armies were understaffed and inadequately equipped. Grand Vizier Köprülü Ahmed Pasha set out with his nearly 80,000-strong army to conquer Royal Hungary, intending this as the first step to an attack on Vienna. The Turks began to besiege Érsekújvár, for which Zrínyi could not do much, even with his army of less than twenty thousand men. But the siege dragged on and the Turks could not continue major campaigns until October 26, if they wanted to retreat to their winter quarters, the Balkans, before the onset of winter.

== Osijek campaign ==
The court was now more thoroughly prepared for the battles of 1664. Meanwhile, Zrinski disturbed the Turks with constant raids and defeated a small army in front of Novi Zrin. Since he did not dare to expect much from Vienna, he made an alliance with two other powerful lords and leading figures of the country, Count Franz III. Nádasdy and Palatine Count Ferenc Wesselényi in Kőszeg in September 1663. They decided to take control of the fight against the Turks. Several ecclesiastical dignitaries and lords were also present at the meeting. Although Zrinski had previously held the position of commander-in-chief, he was replaced after the loss of Érsekújvár.

=== Request for help from other kingdoms ===
The three lords summarized the program of their alliance in a letter: "We, who are the pillars of the country, will start it in a free way, and with this the fate of such a famous, notable, noble nation under the sky will come to a final ruin" Bory Mihály, the delegate of the alliance, went to Regensburg, where the German princes and dukes were conferring, and the head of the Alliance of the Rhine Johann Philipp von Schönborn was also present. The archbishop offered support, but he had already declared the Turkish war to be his cause. Therefore, troops were sent to Hungary under the leadership of Count Wolfgang Julius, Count of Hohenlohe-Neuenstein also promised help, but his troops did not arrive in Hungary until the summer of 1664.

In Regensburg, they decided how the campaign should continue. At Zrinski's suggestion, they decided to attack, and preferably as soon as possible, while the winter lasted, because at this time of year the Turks could not deploy a larger and more effective force. Vienna was not idle either and it also asked Spanish Empire for help against the Turks, but it did not get it.

In a circular, Palatine Wesselényi called on the counties not to surrender despite the Grand Vizier's demands. The Zrinski clearly saw that Hungary and Croatia alone would not be able to stand up to the Ottoman war, which despite all its weaknesses was still very strong, but the Hungarian common people were quite averse to the issue of foreign aid. Zrinski definitely thought of expelling the Turks with this war, which, according to him, depends on Fülöp János. But in Vienna, they did not want the Hungarians' efforts to unify the country to reach their goal. Zrinski and the other Hungarian lords sought support from the French and Louis XIV with loyal German princes, who concluded the Rhine Alliance not only against the Turks, but also to reduce the influence of the Habsburgs in. Therefore, although he continued to prepare for war, he constantly negotiated peace with the Turks.

=== Attack ===
Zrinski's army of around 15,000 Hungarian and Croatian troops joined forces with over 7,000 German troops led by von Hohenlohe and 3,000 Austrians. Starting from Berzence along the Drava, they broke into the southern territory of the Hungarian subjugation 1664. on January 21. During the month considered the hardest part of the winter, Turkish forces were stationed exclusively in castles, not in the open field.

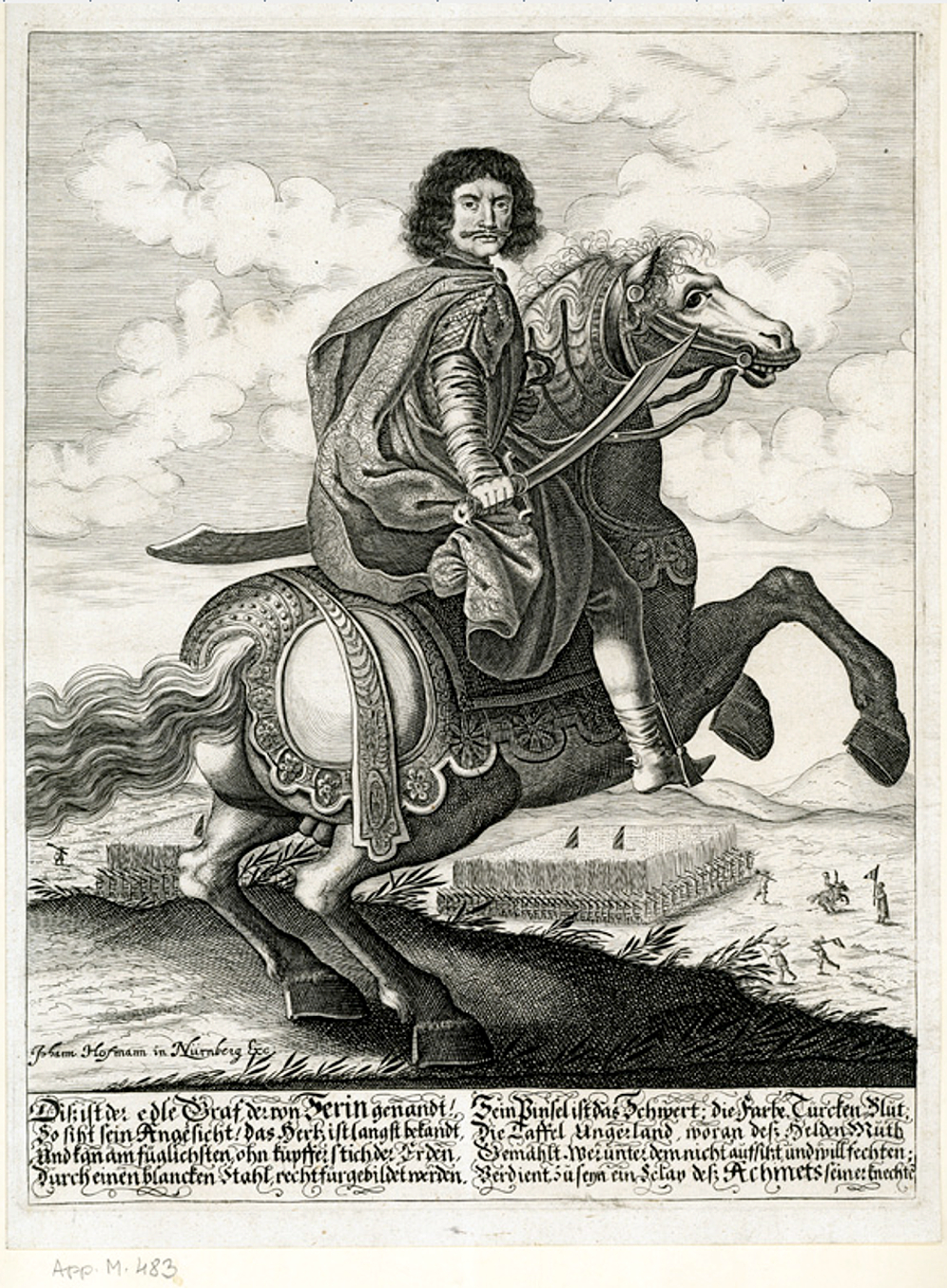
Nikola VII Zrinski

But the operations did not take place exclusively in the Drava region. In the northeast, a Hungarian army led by László Rákóczi and István Barkóczy attacked Várad, not with the aim of recapturing the castle, but somehow distracting the Pasha there. The imperial and Hungarian armies led by the French Jean-Louis de Souches and István Koháry attacked the Turks from the territory of the mining towns in the highlands. The ranks of the latter were supplemented by a Polish brigade commanded by Marshal Jerzy Lubomirski and Captain Sepsésg, recruited by the paladin from Poland.

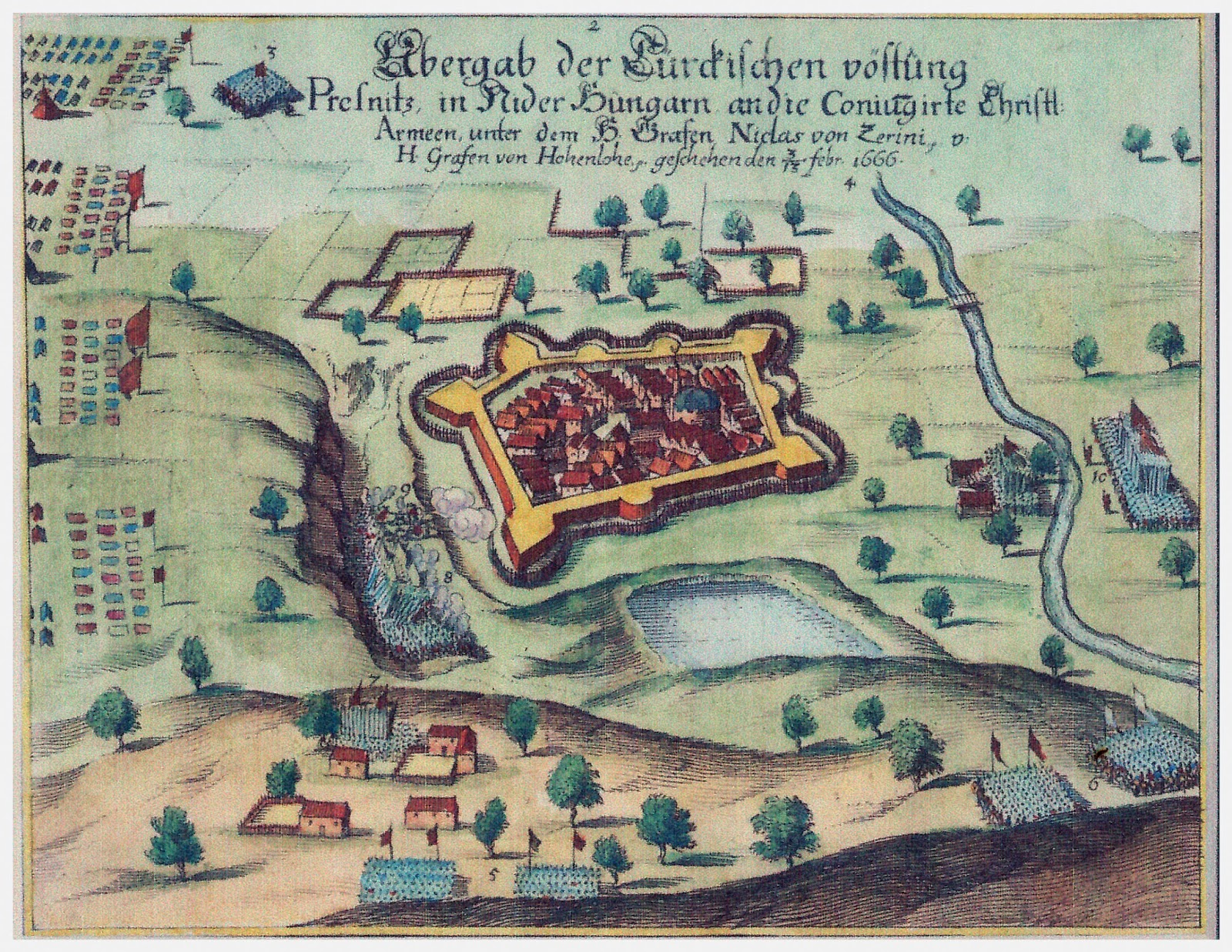
Berzence Castle

Christian armies were already deep in the territory of Baranya. On January 28 he surrounded Pécs with the troops of Zrinski and von Hohenlohe. Two days later, Zrinski and Pál Esterházy, then chief marshal (later palatine), set off with the Croatian and Hungarian cavalry (5,000 men) on the line of the Dráva, while the infantry of their army remained with the Germans at the siege of Pécs.
Zrinski penetrated as far as Osijek, where the Turks still had the 16. century, there was an 8 km long oak bridge. During the wars, supplies were transported through this and it connected the Croatian subjugation with the Hungarians. The bridge was also joined by a bridge of forty ships. Its strategic importance was extremely great, which was best measured by Zrinski.

There was a thick layer of ice on the river, but they couldn't think of an explosion due to the lack of gunpowder. For two days, the cavalry carried dry reeds and reeds from the surrounding forests and swamps, until finally the bridge was well lined with it in two days. From Osijek Castle, the Turks tried to distract the Croats and Hungarians with cannons, but they did not achieve much. Zrinski's cavalry had only one wounded from the shelling. The Turkish guard did not even try to rush out.
On February 1, a sufficient amount of wood and reeds were finally brought to the bridge and lit. A strong wind was blowing, which fueled the flames all the more and finally the entire bridge was engulfed in one huge sea of flames.

Esterházy describes the event as follows: ...with the help of God, we burned the whole structure to dust... It was a horrible sight when we watched this bridge, which was so many thousands of paces long, burning like a lit torch at night, like some devilish vision tearing at us"

While Zrinski was in Osijek, several Croatian, Austrian and Hungarian mainly infantry units from the Christian army that remained at Pécs separated from the army and headed towards the Danube-Drava estuary region. On the way, they occupied the fortresses of Mohács, Szécs, Szekcső, Újvár and Nádas.

The destruction of the bridge was a serious blow to the Turks. On February 3, when the bridge was completely burned down, Zrinski left Osijek back to Pécs. On the way, Baranyavár was burned, and then the siege of Pécs was also lifted.

With the destruction of the Osijek bridge, the wide Drava river separated the Hungarian and Croatian territories in Turkish hands from each other. Furthermore, with the recapture of the castles, the connection with the Kanizsa castle was cut off, for the recapture of which there was a favorable time.

== Other campaigns ==
During the campaign, the Zrinski took a lot of booty: they freed twenty thousand cattle, three thousand horses, countless noble Turks and a hundred Christian prisoners. Von Hohenlohe called the campaign the greatest act of war in the last hundred years, and the future prospects of the battle were also encouraging.

Emperor Leopold I also recognized the success of the campaign, and his leader gained a great reputation in Europe. Zrinski was awarded 10,000 gold by the French king, and the Order of the Golden Fleece by the Spanish king.

Meanwhile, the French formed another league with other western states against the Turks. In a decree Palatine Wesselényi encouraged the counties to free themselves from Turkish rule. The paladin interwoven his statements with thoughts from one of Zrinski's works, The Remedy against Turkish Opium, and thus called the country to arms.

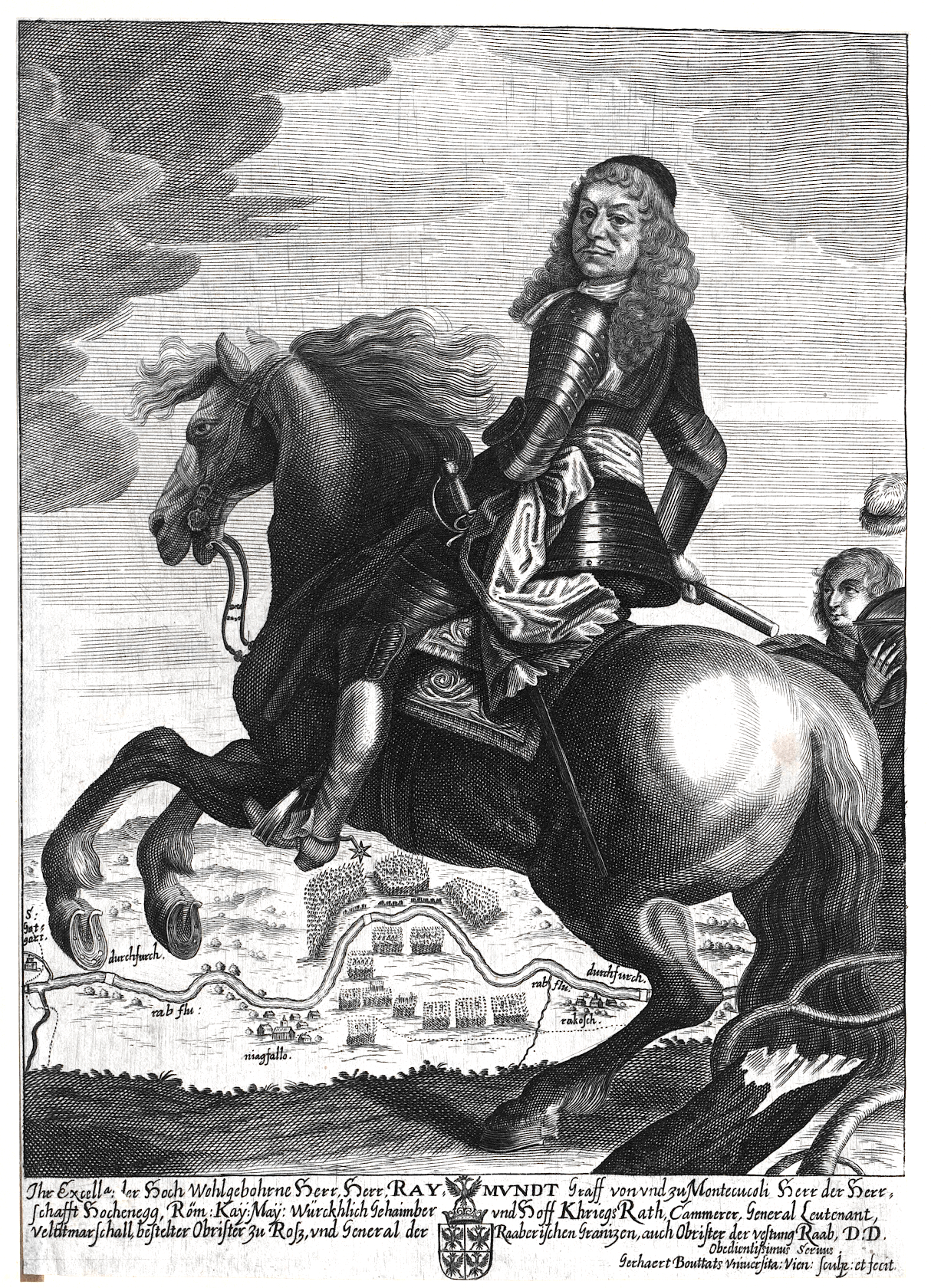
Raimondo Montecuccoli

The issue of the post of chief executive is still being negotiated. The emperor proposed the Italian general Raimondo Montecuccoli, until then the Alliance of the Rhine sided with the Croatian Ban, but the famous French general, Viscount of Turenne, Turenne's viscount. In the end, the military leadership was divided. Zrinski and Montecuccoli were placed at the head of the army. Zrinski then insisted that they begin the siege of Kanizsa as soon as possible, because the Turkish attack will not wait until the end of winter. But the Court War Council, as usual, hesitated, thus missing a great opportunity. If the siege of Kanizsa had been started in time, the serious situation resulting from the loss of Érsekújvár could have been countered by recapturing the city. According to Zrinski, "we should not have waited until spring, because then the Turks could easily relieve the besieged castle".

The military council only issued the permit in March, which, according to Zrinski, was already too late. An army of Hungarian, Croatian, Bavarian, Austrian and Rhine soldiers began the siege of Kanizsa on April 21. The Turkish defenders persisted, and the Grand Vizier Köprülü Ahmed Pasha hurried to relieve them at the head of his 60,000 strong army. He built a bridge on the Drava and marched through it to Kanizsa, and the three times smaller Christian army retreated from it.

The court removed Zrinski from his position as commander-in-chief for the second time. The leadership remained in the hands of Montecuccoli alone. Meanwhile, the Ottoman Grand Vizier Köprülü Ahmed Pasha led his army against Novi Zrin, the construction of which was a casus belli in the eyes of the Porte. Montecuccoli stood with his small number of troops in Međimurje. Many of today's history books are of the opinion that he passively watched the occupation and destruction of the castle. In fact, his soldiers were starving, weakened, and low on munitions. In such a state, it is ready to commit suicide to launch an attack against an enemy that is outnumbered several times. The Turks took the castle on June 30 and destroyed it. Zrinski blamed Montecuccoli for the whole disaster and left for Vienna. The small army of the imperial general was forced to retreat to Murska Sobota (Slovenia).

Another goal of Grand Vizier Köprülü Ahmed Pasha was to break through the Rába line to march against Vienna from there, Mehmed IV by order. However, Montecuccoli, at the head of the Austrian, German, Rhineland and French troops, defeated the Turkish army, in the Battle of Saint Gotthard

Despite the victory, the Viennese court concluded the shameful Peace of Vasvár.

== Sources ==
- R. Várkonyi Ágnes: Megújulások kora, Magyar Könyvklub, Budapest 2001. ISBN 9635484712
- Magyarország hadtörténete, Zrínyi katonai kiadó, Budapest 1985. szerk.: Liptai Ervin ISBN 9633263379
- The famous Winter Campaign of Zrínyi, 1664
